= List of revenue divisions of Tamil Nadu =

This is a list of the revenue divisions and taluks of Tamil Nadu, a southern state of India. These administrative units are classified based on the district. There are 38 districts in Tamil Nadu, and for revenue administration purposes, each district is divided into divisions, headed by a Sub Collector / Revenue Divisional Officer (RDO), which are further divided into taluks. Each of these taluks have a list of revenue villages under them. Tahsildar is the head of these taluks.

Developmental administration, in contrast, is carried out by panchayat unions (called blocks) in rural areas. These panchayat unions have a set of panchayat villages under them. In urban areas, the governance is done by municipal corporations, municipalities or town panchayats based on the size of the town.

== Revenue administrative units ==
The list of revenue administrative units is as under

District	Number of Revenue Divisions	Number of Taluks	Revenue Divisions	Taluk	Firkas	Revenue Villages
Ariyalur	2	4	Ariyalur	Ariyalur	5	68
Ariyalur	2	4	Udayarpalayam	Udayarpalayam	5	69
Ariyalur	2	4	Udayarpalayam	Andimadam	2	30
Ariyalur	2	4	Udayarpalayam	Sendurai	3	28
Chengalpattu	3	8	Tambaram	Pallavaram	1. Pallavaram	13
Chengalpattu	3	8	Tambaram	Pallavaram	2. Pammal	13
Chengalpattu	3	8	Tambaram	Tambaram	1. Chitlapakkam	28
Chengalpattu	3	8	Tambaram	Tambaram	2. Madambakkam	28
Chengalpattu	3	8	Tambaram	Tambaram	3. Medavakkam	28
Chengalpattu	3	8	Tambaram	Tambaram	4. Tambaram	28
Chengalpattu	3	8	Tambaram	Vandalur	1. Guduvancheri	37
Chengalpattu	3	8	Tambaram	Vandalur	2. Mambakkam	37
Chengalpattu	3	8	Tambaram	Vandalur	3. Vandalur	37
Chengalpattu	3	8	Chengalpattu	Chengalpattu	1. Appur	72
Chengalpattu	3	8	Chengalpattu	Chengalpattu	2. Chengalpattu	72
Chengalpattu	3	8	Chengalpattu	Chengalpattu	3. Kattankolathur	72
Chengalpattu	3	8	Chengalpattu	Chengalpattu	4. Palur	72
Chengalpattu	3	8	Chengalpattu	Chengalpattu	5. Singaperumalkoil	72
Chengalpattu	3	8	Chengalpattu	Thiruporur	1. Karumbakkam	84
Chengalpattu	3	8	Chengalpattu	Thiruporur	2. Kelambakkam	84
Chengalpattu	3	8	Chengalpattu	Thiruporur	3. Manamathi	84
Chengalpattu	3	8	Chengalpattu	Thiruporur	4. Nellikuppam	84
Chengalpattu	3	8	Chengalpattu	Thiruporur	5. Paiyanur	84
Chengalpattu	3	8	Chengalpattu	Thiruporur	6. Thiruporur	84
Chengalpattu	3	8	Chengalpattu	Tirukalukundram	1. Mamallapuram	84
Chengalpattu	3	8	Chengalpattu	Tirukalukundram	2. Nerumbur	84
Chengalpattu	3	8	Chengalpattu	Tirukalukundram	3. Ponvilaiianthakalathur	84
Chengalpattu	3	8	Chengalpattu	Tirukalukundram	4. Thirukalukundram	84
Chengalpattu	3	8	Madurantakam	Madurantakam	1. Achirapakkam	195
Chengalpattu	3	8	Madurantakam	Madurantakam	2. Jaminendathur	195
Chengalpattu	3	8	Madurantakam	Madurantakam	3. Karunkuzhi	195
Chengalpattu	3	8	Madurantakam	Madurantakam	4. L. Endathur	195
Chengalpattu	3	8	Madurantakam	Madurantakam	5. Maduranthagam	195
Chengalpattu	3	8	Madurantakam	Madurantakam	6. Onambakkam	195
Chengalpattu	3	8	Madurantakam	Madurantakam	7. Orathi	195
Chengalpattu	3	8	Madurantakam	Madurantakam	8. Perumbakkam	195
Chengalpattu	3	8	Madurantakam	Madurantakam	9. Vaiyavur	195
Chengalpattu	3	8	Madurantakam	Cheyyur	1. Cheyyur	123
Chengalpattu	3	8	Madurantakam	Cheyyur	2. Chithamour	123
Chengalpattu	3	8	Madurantakam	Cheyyur	3. Chunambedu	123
Chengalpattu	3	8	Madurantakam	Cheyyur	4. Kadappakkam	123
Chengalpattu	3	8	Madurantakam	Cheyyur	5. Kayapakkam	123
Chengalpattu	3	8	Madurantakam	Cheyyur	6. Kodur	123
Chengalpattu	3	8	Madurantakam	Cheyyur	7. Lathur	123
Chennai	3	16	Chennai North	Tondiarpet	4	4
Chennai	3	16	Chennai North	Tiruvottiyur	2	12
Chennai	3	16	Chennai North	Perambur	4	8
Chennai	3	16	Chennai North	Madhavaram	2	11
Chennai	3	16	Chennai North	Purasawalkam	4	4
Chennai	3	16	Chennai Central	Ambattur	2	10
Chennai	3	16	Chennai Central	Ayanavaram	4	8
Chennai	3	16	Chennai Central	Egmore	4	4
Chennai	3	16	Chennai Central	Aminjikarai	4	11
Chennai	3	16	Chennai Central	Mambalam	4	7
Chennai	3	16	Chennai Central	Maduravoyal	2	10
Chennai	3	16	Chennai South	Guindy	4	9
Chennai	3	16	Chennai South	Alandur	1	10
Chennai	3	16	Chennai South	Sholinganallur	2	17
Chennai	3	16	Chennai South	Mylapore	4	5
Chennai	3	16	Chennai South	Velachery	4	8
Coimbatore	3	11				
Coimbatore	3	11	Coimbatore North	Mettupalayam	2	19
Coimbatore	3	11	Coimbatore North	Coimbatore North	5	25
Coimbatore	3	11	Coimbatore North	Annur	3	30
Coimbatore	3	11	Coimbatore South	Coimbatore South	2	5
Coimbatore	3	11	Coimbatore South	Perur	6	24
Coimbatore	3	11	Coimbatore South	Madukkarai	4	19
Coimbatore	3	11	Coimbatore South	Sulur	4	41
Coimbatore	3	11	Pollachi	Pollachi	5	65
Coimbatore	3	11	Pollachi	Kinathukadavu	3	35
Coimbatore	3	11	Pollachi	Valparai	1	1
Coimbatore	3	11	Pollachi	Anaimalai	3	31
Cuddalore	3	10	Cuddalore	Panruti	4	99
Cuddalore	3	10	Cuddalore	Cuddalore	3	82
Cuddalore	3	10	Cuddalore	Kurinjipadi	2	71
Cuddalore	3	10	Chidambaram	Chidambaram	3	120
Cuddalore	3	10	Chidambaram	Kattumannarkoil	4	123
Cuddalore	3	10	Chidambaram	Bhuvanagiri	3	73
Cuddalore	3	10	Chidambaram	Srimushnam	2	51
Cuddalore	3	10	Vridhachalam	Vriddachalam	5	124
Cuddalore	3	10	Vridhachalam	Tittakudi	4	109
Cuddalore	3	10	Vridhachalam	Veppur	2	53
Dharmapuri	2	7	Harur	Harur	3	165
Dharmapuri	2	7	Harur	Pappireddipatti	4	98
Dharmapuri	2	7	Dharmapuri	Dharmapuri	2	33
Dharmapuri	2	7	Dharmapuri	Palacode	4	69
Dharmapuri	2	7	Dharmapuri	Pennagaram	4	43
Dharmapuri	2	7	Dharmapuri	Nallampalli	3	31
Dharmapuri	2	7	Dharmapuri	Karimangalam	3	40
Dindigul	3	10	Dindigul	Dindigul East	4	40
Dindigul	3	10	Dindigul	Dindigul West	4	32
Dindigul	3	10	Dindigul	Natham	3	26
Dindigul	3	10	Dindigul	Athoor	3	22
Dindigul	3	10	Dindigul	Nilakkottai	5	43
Dindigul	3	10	Palani	Palani	6	62
Dindigul	3	10	Palani	Oddanchatram	5	57
Dindigul	3	10	Palani	Vedasandur	4	39
Dindigul	3	10	Palani	Gujiliamparai	3	24
Dindigul	3	10	Kodaikanal	Kodaikanal	3	16
Erode	2	10	Erode	Erode	3	41
Erode	2	10	Erode	Perundurai	5	72
Erode	2	10	Erode	Modakurichi	3	29
Erode	2	10	Erode	Kodumudi	3	24
Erode	2	10	Gobichettipalayam	Gobichettipalayam	5	51
Erode	2	10	Gobichettipalayam	Sathyamangalam	5	52
Erode	2	10	Gobichettipalayam	Bhavani	3	29
Erode	2	10	Gobichettipalayam	Anthiyur	4	30
Erode	2	10	Gobichettipalayam	Thalavadi	1	20
Erode	2	10	Gobichettipalayam	Nambiyur	3	27
Kallakurichi	2	7	Tirukkoilur	Tirukkoyilur	4	74
Kallakurichi	2	7	Tirukkoilur	Ulundurpet	6	151
Kallakurichi	2	7	Kallakurichi	Kallakurichi	4	93
Kallakurichi	2	7	Kallakurichi	Sankarapuram	5	133
Kallakurichi	2	7	Kallakurichi	Chinnaselam	3	63
Kallakurichi	2	7	Kallakurichi	Kalvarayan Hills	2	44
Kallakurichi	2	7	Kallakurichi	Vanapuram	4	85
Kancheepuram	2	5	Kancheepuram	Kancheepuram	6	116
Kancheepuram	2	5	Kancheepuram	Walajabad	3	76
Kancheepuram	2	5	Kancheepuram	Uthiramerur	6	121
Kancheepuram	2	5	Sriperumbudur	Sriperumbudur	5	82
Kancheepuram	2	5	Sriperumbudur	Kundrathur	5	84
Kanniyakumari	2	6	Nagercoil	Agastheeswaram	5	43
Kanniyakumari	2	6	Nagercoil	Thovalai	3	24
Kanniyakumari	2	6	Padmanabhapuram	Kalkulam	4	45
Kanniyakumari	2	6	Padmanabhapuram	Vilavancode	3	28
Kanniyakumari	2	6	Padmanabhapuram	Thiruvattar	2	21
Kanniyakumari	2	6	Padmanabhapuram	Killiyoor	5	27
Karur	2	7	Karur	Karur	3	22
Karur	2	7	Karur	Aravakurichi	3	40
Karur	2	7	Karur	Pugalur	3	27
Karur	2	7	Karur	Manmangalam	3	21
Karur	2	7	Kulithalai	Kulithalai	3	45
Karur	2	7	Kulithalai	Krishnarayapuram	3	25
Karur	2	7	Kulithalai	Kadavur	2	23
Krishnagiri	2	8	Krishnagiri	Krishnagiri	6	131
Krishnagiri	2	8	Krishnagiri	Pochampalli	4	37
Krishnagiri	2	8	Krishnagiri	Uthangarai	4	185
Krishnagiri	2	8	Krishnagiri	Bargur	2	30
Krishnagiri	2	8	Hosur	Hosur	4	92
Krishnagiri	2	8	Hosur	Denkanikottai	6	75
Krishnagiri	2	8	Hosur	Shoolagiri	3	92
Krishnagiri	2	8	Hosur	Anchetty	2	15
Madurai	4	11	Madurai	Madurai North	5	82
Madurai	4	11	Madurai	Madurai West	2	21
Madurai	4	11	Madurai	Vadipatti	7	77
Madurai	4	11	Usilampatti	Usilampatti	5	54
Madurai	4	11	Usilampatti	Peraiyur	6	75
Madurai	4	11	Melur	Melur	8	84
Madurai	4	11	Melur	Madurai East	7	106
Madurai	4	11	Melur	Madurai South	3	31
Madurai	4	11	Thirumangalam	Thirumangalam	3	61
Madurai	4	11	Thirumangalam	Thirupparankundram	2	27
Madurai	4	11	Thirumangalam	Kalligudi	3	47
Mayiladuthurai	2	4	Mayiladuthurai	Mayiladuthurai	3	67
Mayiladuthurai	2	4	Mayiladuthurai	Kuthalam	3	94
Mayiladuthurai	2	4	Sirkazhi	Sirkazhi	5	55
Mayiladuthurai	2	4	Sirkazhi	Tharangambadi	4	70
Nagapattinam	2	4	Nagapattinam	Nagapattinam	5	85
Nagapattinam	2	4	Nagapattinam	Kilvelur	4	55
Nagapattinam	2	4	Vedaranyam	Thirukkuvalai	3	35
Nagapattinam	2	4	Vedaranyam	Vedaranyam	4	57
Namakkal	2	8	Namakkal	Namakkal	5	68
Namakkal	2	8	Namakkal	Rasipuram	5	93
Namakkal	2	8	Namakkal	Sendamangalam	4	42
Namakkal	2	8	Namakkal	Kolli Hills	2	16
Namakkal	2	8	Namakkal	Mohanur	4	31
Namakkal	2	8	Tiruchengodu	Paramathi Velur	4	60
Namakkal	2	8	Tiruchengodu	Thiruchengodu	6	92
Namakkal	2	8	Tiruchengodu	Kumarapalayam	2	20
Perambalur	1	4	Perambalur	Perambalur	2	27
Perambalur	1	4	Perambalur	Alathur	3	39
Perambalur	1	4	Perambalur	Veppanthattai	3	39
Perambalur	1	4	Perambalur	Kunnam	3	47
Pudukkottai	3	12	Pudukkottai	Pudukkottai	2	40
Pudukkottai	3	12	Pudukkottai	Alangudi	4	73
Pudukkottai	3	12	Pudukkottai	Gandarvakottai	3	37
Pudukkottai	3	12	Pudukkottai	Tirumayam	5	81
Pudukkottai	3	12	Pudukkottai	Karambakudi	2	50
Pudukkottai	3	12	Illupur	Illuppur	4	58
Pudukkottai	3	12	Illupur	Kulathur	5	65
Pudukkottai	3	12	Illupur	Ponnamaravathi	3	49
Pudukkottai	3	12	Illupur	Viralimalai	3	37
Pudukkottai	3	12	Aranthangi	Aranthangi	6	105
Pudukkottai	3	12	Aranthangi	Avadaiyarkoil	4	96
Pudukkottai	3	12	Aranthangi	Manamelkudi	4	72
Ramanathapuram	2	9	Ramanathapuram	Ramanathapuram	4	43
Ramanathapuram	2	9	Ramanathapuram	Tiruvadanai	4	61
Ramanathapuram	2	9	Ramanathapuram	Rameswaram	1	2
Ramanathapuram	2	9	Ramanathapuram	Kilakarai	3	26
Ramanathapuram	2	9	Ramanathapuram	R. S. Mangalam	3	39
Ramanathapuram	2	9	Paramakudi	Paramakudi	6	91
Ramanathapuram	2	9	Paramakudi	Kadaladi	6	43
Ramanathapuram	2	9	Paramakudi	Mudukulathur	6	46
Ramanathapuram	2	9	Paramakudi	Kamuthi	5	49
Ranipet	2	6	Ranipet	Walajah	3	55
Ranipet	2	6	Ranipet	Arcot	3	52
Ranipet	2	6	Ranipet	Kalavai	2	50
Ranipet	2	6	Ranipet	Sholingur	3	49
Ranipet	2	6	Arakkonam	Arakkonam	4	58
Ranipet	2	6	Arakkonam	Nemili	3	66
Salem	4	14	Salem	Salem	3	59
Salem	4	14	Salem	Salem West	3	40
Salem	4	14	Salem	Salem South	3	49
Salem	4	14	Salem	Yercaud	3	67
Salem	4	14	Salem	Valapady	4	64
Salem	4	14	Attur	Attur	2	30
Salem	4	14	Attur	Gangavalli	2	27
Salem	4	14	Attur	Pethanaickenpalayam	3	47
Salem	4	14	Attur	Thalaivasal	3	42
Salem	4	14	Mettur	Mettur	6	48
Salem	4	14	Mettur	Omalur	3	62
Salem	4	14	Mettur	Kadayampatti	2	28
Salem	4	14	Sankari	Sankari	4	52
Salem	4	14	Sankari	Edappadi	3	25
Sivagangai	2	9	Sivagangai	Sivagangai	5	67
Sivagangai	2	9	Sivagangai	Ilayankudi	5	52
Sivagangai	2	9	Sivagangai	Kalaiyarkovil	5	63
Sivagangai	2	9	Sivagangai	Manamadurai	3	41
Sivagangai	2	9	Sivagangai	Tiruppuvanam	3	43
Sivagangai	2	9	Devakottai	Devakottai	5	91
Sivagangai	2	9	Devakottai	Thirupattur	5	59
Sivagangai	2	9	Devakottai	Karaikudi	5	64
Sivagangai	2	9	Devakottai	Sigampunari	3	41
Thanjavur	3	9	Thanjavur	Thanjavur	5	63
Thanjavur	3	9	Thanjavur	Thiruvaiyaru	3	56
Thanjavur	3	9	Thanjavur	Budalur	4	63
Thanjavur	3	9	Thanjavur	Orathanad	8	125
Thanjavur	3	9	Kumbakonam	Kumbakonam	5	124
Thanjavur	3	9	Kumbakonam	Papanasam	6	120
Thanjavur	3	9	Kumbakonam	Thiruvidaimaruthur	5	89
Thanjavur	3	9	Pattukkottai	Pattukkottai	10	175
Thanjavur	3	9	Pattukkottai	Peravurani	4	91
The Nilgiris	3	6	Coonoor	Kotagiri	3	23
The Nilgiris	3	6	Coonoor	Coonoor	3	15
The Nilgiris	3	6	Udhagai	Kundah	2	10
The Nilgiris	3	6	Udhagai	Udhagai	3	19
The Nilgiris	3	6	Gudalur	Gudalur	2	13
The Nilgiris	3	6	Gudalur	Pandalur	2	8
Tenkasi	2	8	Tenkasi	Tenkasi	4	40
Tenkasi	2	8	Tenkasi	Kadayanallur	3	31
Tenkasi	2	8	Tenkasi	Shencottai	3	19
Tenkasi	2	8	Tenkasi	Alangulam	4	35
Tenkasi	2	8	Tenkasi	V.K.Pudur	4	24
Tenkasi	2	8	Sankarankovil	Sankarankovil	5	35
Tenkasi	2	8	Sankarankovil	Thiruvengadam	3	41
Tenkasi	2	8	Sankarankovil	Sivagiri	3	21
Theni	2	5	Periyakulam	Periyakulam	2	22
Theni	2	5	Periyakulam	Theni	2	12
Theni	2	5	Periyakulam	Aundipatti	4	25
Theni	2	5	Uthamapalayam	Uthamapalayam	6	39
Theni	2	5	Uthamapalayam	Bodinayakanur	3	15
Thiruchirappalli	4	11	Tiruchirappalli	Thiruchirappalli West	2	13
Thiruchirappalli	4	11	Tiruchirappalli	Thiruchirappalli East	2	11
Thiruchirappalli	4	11	Tiruchirappalli	Thiruverumbur	3	31
Thiruchirappalli	4	11	Srirangam	Srirangam	5	59
Thiruchirappalli	4	11	Srirangam	Manapparai	4	51
Thiruchirappalli	4	11	Srirangam	Marungapuri	3	45
Thiruchirappalli	4	11	Musiri	Musiri	6	61
Thiruchirappalli	4	11	Musiri	Thuraiyur	6	67
Thiruchirappalli	4	11	Musiri	Thottiam	3	30
Thiruchirappalli	4	11	Lalgudi	Lalgudi	6	93
Thiruchirappalli	4	11	Lalgudi	Mannachanallur	3	46
Tirunelveli	2	8	Tirunelveli	Tirunelveli	4	58
Tirunelveli	2	8	Tirunelveli	Manur	3	32
Tirunelveli	2	8	Tirunelveli	Palayamkottai	4	58
Tirunelveli	2	8	Cheranmahadevi	Cheranmahadevi	4	45
Tirunelveli	2	8	Cheranmahadevi	Ambasamuduram	2	34
Tirunelveli	2	8	Cheranmahadevi	Tisaiyanvilai	2	21
Tirunelveli	2	8	Cheranmahadevi	Nanguneri	5	74
Tirunelveli	2	8	Cheranmahadevi	Radhapuram	6	36
Thirupathur	2	4	Thirupathur	Natrampalli	2	30
Thirupathur	2	4	Thirupathur	Thirupathur	6	70
Thirupathur	2	4	Vaniyambadi	Vaniyambadi	3	41
Thirupathur	2	4	Vaniyambadi	Ambur	4	54
Tiruppur	3	9	Tiruppur	Tiruppur North	2	7
Tiruppur	3	9	Tiruppur	Tiruppur South	3	16
Tiruppur	3	9	Tiruppur	Avinashi	4	41
Tiruppur	3	9	Tiruppur	Uthukuli	2	49
Tiruppur	3	9	Tiruppur	Palladam	4	29
Tiruppur	3	9	Dharapuram	Dharapuram	7	71
Tiruppur	3	9	Dharapuram	Kangeyam	4	44
Tiruppur	3	9	Udumalpet	Udumalpet	5	75
Tiruppur	3	9	Udumalpet	Madathukkulam	2	18
Tiruvallur	3	9	Tiruvallur	Avadi	5	31
Tiruvallur	3	9	Tiruvallur	Poonamallee	5	48
Tiruvallur	3	9	Tiruvallur	Tiruvallur	9	168
Tiruvallur	3	9	Tiruvallur	Uthukottai	5	100
Tiruvallur	3	9	Ponneri	Ponneri	9	200
Tiruvallur	3	9	Ponneri	Gummidipoondi	4	88
Tiruvallur	3	9	Tiruttani	Tiruttani	6	87
Tiruvallur	3	9	Tiruttani	Pallipattu	3	33
Tiruvallur	3	9	Tiruttani	RK Pet	3	37
Tiruvannamalai	3	12	Tiruvannamalai	Tiruvannamalai	7	135
Tiruvannamalai	3	12	Tiruvannamalai	Chengam	5	107
Tiruvannamalai	3	12	Tiruvannamalai	Thandarampet	3	63
Tiruvannamalai	3	12	Tiruvannamalai	Kilpennathur	3	77
Tiruvannamalai	3	12	Arni	Arni	5	49
Tiruvannamalai	3	12	Arni	Polur	5	94
Tiruvannamalai	3	12	Arni	Kalasapakkam	3	52
Tiruvannamalai	3	12	Arni	Jamunamarathoor	2	34
Tiruvannamalai	3	12	Cheyyar	Cheyyar	5	131
Tiruvannamalai	3	12	Cheyyar	Vandavasi	8	161
Tiruvannamalai	3	12	Cheyyar	Chetpet	4	76
Tiruvannamalai	3	12	Cheyyar	Vembakkam	4	91
Tiruvarur	2	8	Tiruvarur	Tiruvarur	3	68
Tiruvarur	2	8	Tiruvarur	Kudavasal	3	63
Tiruvarur	2	8	Tiruvarur	Nannilam	4	73
Tiruvarur	2	8	Tiruvarur	Valangaiman	3	71
Tiruvarur	2	8	Mannargudi	Needamangalam	3	51
Tiruvarur	2	8	Mannargudi	Tiruthuraipoondi	4	77
Tiruvarur	2	8	Mannargudi	Mannargudi	5	115
Tiruvarur	2	8	Mannargudi	Koothanallur	3	55
Thoothukudi	3	10	Thoothukudi	Thoothukudi	4	33
Thoothukudi	3	10	Thoothukudi	Srivaikundam	4	46
Thoothukudi	3	10	Kovilpatty	Kovilpatty	3	33
Thoothukudi	3	10	Kovilpatty	Ottapidaram	6	63
Thoothukudi	3	10	Kovilpatty	Ettayapuram	5	56
Thoothukudi	3	10	Kovilpatty	Vilathikulam	6	89
Thoothukudi	3	10	Kovilpatty	Kayathar	4	54
Thoothukudi	3	10	Tiruchendur	Tiruchendur	3	36
Thoothukudi	3	10	Tiruchendur	Sathankulam	3	25
Thoothukudi	3	10	Tiruchendur	Eral	3	45
Vellore	2	6	Vellore	Vellore	5	51
Vellore	2	6	Vellore	Anaicut	5	80
Vellore	2	6	Vellore	Katpadi	3	49
Vellore	2	6	Gudiyatham	Gudiyatham	3	61
Vellore	2	6	Gudiyatham	Pernambut	2	32
Vellore	2	6	Gudiyatham	K V Kuppam	2	41
Viluppuram	2	9	Viluppuram	Viluppuram	4	123
Viluppuram	2	9	Viluppuram	Vanur	4	81
Viluppuram	2	9	Viluppuram	Vikkiravandi	4	116
Viluppuram	2	9	Viluppuram	Thiruvennainallur	3	70
Viluppuram	2	9	Viluppuram	Kandachipuram	2	62
Viluppuram	2	9	Tindivanam	Tindivanam	7	174
Viluppuram	2	9	Tindivanam	Gingee	4	166
Viluppuram	2	9	Tindivanam	Marakkanam	3	60
Viluppuram	2	9	Tindivanam	Melmalaiyanur	3	80
Virudhunagar	3	10	Arupukottai	Virudhunagar	4	53
Virudhunagar	3	10	Arupukottai	Aruppukottai	5	83
Virudhunagar	3	10	Arupukottai	Kariyapatti	4	107
Virudhunagar	3	10	Arupukottai	Tiruchuli	4	150
Virudhunagar	3	10	Sivakasi	Sivakasi	4	36
Virudhunagar	3	10	Sivakasi	Srivilliputhur	3	26
Virudhunagar	3	10	Sivakasi	Watrap	3	23
Virudhunagar	3	10	Sattur			
Virudhunagar	3	10	Sattur	Sattur	4	53
Virudhunagar	3	10	Sattur	Vembakkottai	4	37
Virudhunagar	3	10	Sattur	Rajapalayam	4	32

== See also ==
- Districts of Tamil Nadu
- Government of Tamil Nadu
- List of developmental administrative units of Tamil Nadu
