= Thoppampatti =

Town in Tamil Nadu, India

- village
- Location in Tamil Nadu, India
- Coordinates: 10°34′30″N 77°31′45″E
- Country: India
- State: Tamil Nadu
- Region: Kongu Nadu
- District: Dindukkal
- Taluk: Palani

Government
  - Type: Town Panchayat
  - Body: Thoppampatti block
- Elevation: 373 m (1,224 ft)

Population (2011)
  - Total: 3,443

Languages
  - Official: Tamil, English
- Time zone: UTC+5:30 (IST)
- PIN: 624617
- STD Code: 04545
- Vehicle registration: TN-94
- Website: dindigul.nic.in/directory/bdo-thoppampatti/

Thoppampatti is a small town located in Palani taluk of Dindigul district in Indian state of Tamil Nadu. It is the headquarters of the Thoppampatti Panchayat Union in Tiruppur district. It is located 20 kilometers (12 miles) away from Dharapuram and 10 kilometers (6.2 miles) away from Palani in Erode-Dharapuram-Palani highway.

== Administration and politics ==
Thoppampatti's economy is based on agriculture. Thoppampatti comes under Palani taluk, Dindigul district and headquarters of Thoppampatti block. It falls under Palani state assembly constituency and Dindigul Lok Sabha constituency.

AIADMK, DMK and BJP are the major political parties in this area.

This town also houses a police station.

== Connectivity ==
There are buses available 24/7 to Coimbatore, Dharapuram, Palladam, Tiruppur, Madurai, Oddanchatram, Palani and Dindigul. A nearby railway station is Palani railway station and a nearby airport is Coimbatore International Airport.

== See also ==
- Dharapuram
- Palani
- Palani Hills
