= Ramanathapuram, Dindigul District =

Coordinates: 10.388588°N 78.085413°E

Ramanathapuram is a village in Dindigul District, Tamil Nadu, India.

It is about 5 km from Vadamadurai.
