= Ayakudi =

- Town
- Location in Tamil Nadu, India
- Coordinates: 10°26′23″N 77°34′21″E
- Country: India
- State: Tamil Nadu
- District: Dindigul

Population (2001)
  - Total: 23,410

Languages
  - Official: Tamil
- Time zone: UTC+5:30 (IST)

Ayakudi is a panchayat town in Dindigul district in the state of Tamil Nadu, India. The city is known for guava. It is filled with nature in the slopes of Kodaikanal.

== Etymology ==
Ayakudi refers to ayar 'shepherd' and kudi 'dwelling place', which aligns itself with the settlement of pastoralists in the Mullai land of the Sangam landscape. Ayar are also called konar.

== Geography ==
Ayakudi is located at a distance of 4 km from Palani, 24 km from Oddanchatram, 40 km from Dharapuram, 55 km from Dindigul, 110 km from Madurai and 134 km from Coimbatore.

== Demographics ==
- Ayakudi had a population of 27,156 as per the 2011 Census, out of which 13,533 are males while 13,623 are females in the town.
- The population of children aged 0–6 is 2526, which is 9.30% of the total population of the town.
- The female sex ratio is 1007, against the Tamilnadu state average of 996. Moreover, the child sex ratio in Ayakudi is around 910, compared to the Tamil Nadu state average of 943.
- The literacy rate of the town is 68.79% against the state average of 80.09%. The male literacy is around 76.79% while the female literacy rate is 60.85%.

Religions in Ayakudi (2011)
| Religion | Percent |
| Hinduism | 84.18% |
| Islam | 14.91% |
| Christianity | 0.80% |
| Sikhism | 0.07% |
| Other or not stated | 0.04% |

- The Schedule Caste (SC) constitutes about 48.07% of the population, while the Schedule Tribe (ST) were 1.08% of total population in the town.
- Hindus formed the majority of the population at 84.18% followed by Muslims at 14.91%, Christians at 0.80% and others at 0.11% as per the 2011 Census.

== Places of interest ==
This place is (3.0 km) from Palani, and its Lord Muruga Temple. The hill station called Kodaikanal is about 60 km from Ayakudi. A pond divides the city into Old Ayakudi (east of the pond) and New Ayakudi (west) and Obulapuram.

=== Education ===
There are Government primary schools and private primary schools are available inside the village.
