= Balakrishnapuram =

- city
- Location in Tamil Nadu, India Balakrishnapuram (India)
- Coordinates: 10°21′38″N 78°0′38″E
- Country: India
- State: Tamil Nadu
- District: Dindigul

Population (2001)
  - Total: 19,661

Languages
  - Official: Tamil
- Time zone: UTC+5:30 (IST)

Balakrishnapuram is a panchayat town in Dindigul district in the state of Tamil Nadu, India.

== Demographics ==
As of 2001 India census, Balakrishnapuram had a population of 19,661. Males constitute 51% of the population and females 49%. Balakrishnapuram has an average literacy rate of 74%, higher than the national average of 59.5%; with 55% of the males and 45% of females literate. 10% of the population is under 6 years of age.
