= Parumarathupatti =

Parumarathupatti Paruvai
- Village
- Location in Tamil Nadu, India
- Coordinates: 10.5637399°N 77.7971104°E
- Country: India
- Taluk: Oddanchatram
- State: Tamil Nadu
- District: Dindigul

Languages
- Time zone: UTC+5:30 (IST)
- PIN: 624704
- Area code: 04553
- Vehicle registration: TN 57

Parumarathupatti is a village in Tamil Nadu, India. It is located in Javathupatti Panchayat in Oddanchatram Taluk which is in Dindigul district.
