= Thirumalaigoundenvalasu =

- village
- Location in Tamil Nadu, India Thirumalaigoundenvalasu (India)
- Coordinates: 10.66°N 77.62°E
- Country: India
- State: Tamil Nadu
- District: Dindigul
- Elevation: 250 m (820 ft)

Population (2004)
  - Total: 719

Languages
  - Official: Tamil
- Time zone: UTC+5:30 (IST)
- PIN: 624616
- Telephone code: 91-(0)4553
- Vehicle registration: TN 57

Thirumalaigoundenvalasu is a village and a panchayat in the oddanchatram Taluk of Dindigul district in the South Indian state of Tamil Nadu.

== Geography ==
Poosaipatti Oadai flows through Thirumalaigoundenvalasu (Poosaripatti Oadai joins Nallathangal Oadai at Salakadai). Its average elevation is around 270 metres. Thirumalaigoundenvalasu is located at 10.66°N 77.62°E.

== Demographics ==
As of 2004 India census, Thirumalaigoundenvalasu had a population of 719. Males constitute 50.9% of the population and females 49.1%. It has an average literacy rate of 69%, lower than the national average of 73.8%: male literacy is 70% and, female literacy is 68%. The majority of the people belongs to the Gounder community.

As per Electoral census, total voter list is 384 which contributes 199 men and 185 women.

- Thirumalaigoundenvalasu is one of the biggest Village in the Dindigul district. It situates in the border of Dindigul district and nearer to Tirupur district
- A famous Temple of Chinnakalliamman is situated in Thirumalaigoundenvalasu. And another famous Temple of Ammankovil is also situated in nearby Village.
- Main trading center for this village is Kallimandhayam - 10.9 km . Nearest town is Dharapuram which is located 14.8 km from this village.

== Agriculture ==
The main crops are paddy, corn, peanuts, tomato, chillies, some other vegetables, grains and medical valued crops.

== Transport ==
Thirumalaigoundenvalasu is 94.3 km from Erode, 97.7 km from Coimbatore. 67.6 km from Tirupur, 75.6 km from Karur, 117 km from Madurai. It is 54.4 km from Dindigul, 30.4 km From Palani, 72.1 km from Pollachi, 51 km from Udumalpet and 71.2 km from Thirumoorthy falls.

The nearest international airport is Coimbatore (for few connectivity) and Chennai for major, located 92.1 km away. The nearest Railway Station to this village are Palani, Dindigul and Tirupur located at a distance of 30.4 km, 54.4 km and 67.6 km respectively.
