= Veerachinnampatty =

- Village
- Location within India
- Coordinates: 10°18′23″N 78°5′40″E
- Country: India
- State: Tamil Nadu
- District: Dindigul
- Time zone: UTC+05:30 (IST)
- Pincode: 624304

Veerachinnampatty is a village in Dindigul district, Tamil Nadu, India. This village is located on the way of Dindigul and Natham highway. This village is a separate panchayat in sanarpatty union.

== School ==
Pums Veerachinnampatty is a Primary with Upper Primary School in Veerachinampatty Village of Sanarpatty. It was established in 1907, and the school management is Local body. It is a Tamil Medium - Co-educational school.

Pums Veerachinnampatty runs in a government school building. The school has total 9 classrooms. The lowest Class is 1 and the highest class in the school is 8. This school has 3 male teachers and 5 female teachers. There is a library facility available in this school, and the total number of books in library is about 810.

This school also has a playground. Pums Veerachinnampatty does not provide any residential facility. The school also provides meal facility, and meals are prepared in school.

== Murugan Temple ==
Veerachinnampatty Murugan Temple was built in 1957 by Velu Pillai and Muthu Pillai. The temple is located near a river and is also known as Aathankarai Murugan Temple. The temple's main festivals include Thaipoosam and Panguni Uthiram, which are celebrated by the local community. The temple is associated with the property of the Veettu Pangalis family. One of its priests is Ganesan Pillai.
