= Pithalaipatti =

Coordinates: 10°20′40″N 77°54′56″E

Anumantharayan Kottai
- Village
- Interactive map of Anumantharayan Kottai
- Country: India
- State: Tamil Nadu
- District: Dindigul

Government
  - Type: Gram Panchayat

Languages
  - Official: Tamil
- Time zone: UTC+5:30 (IST)
- Postal code: 624002
- Vehicle registration: TN-
- Coastline: 0 kilometres (0 mi)

Pithalaipatti is a village located in Dindigul district, Tamil Nadu, India. It is at a distance of 8 km from Dindigul city. The area postal pin code is 624002.

The economy of the village is based on Textile industry and agriculture. The source of agriculture in the village is Kudaganaru river.
