= Kannivadi =

Kannivadi may refer to:

- Kannivadi, Tiruppur
- Kannivadi, Dindigul
