= Anumantharayan Kottai =

Anumantharayan Kottai Hanumantharayan Kottai, H.R. Kottai, A. Kottai
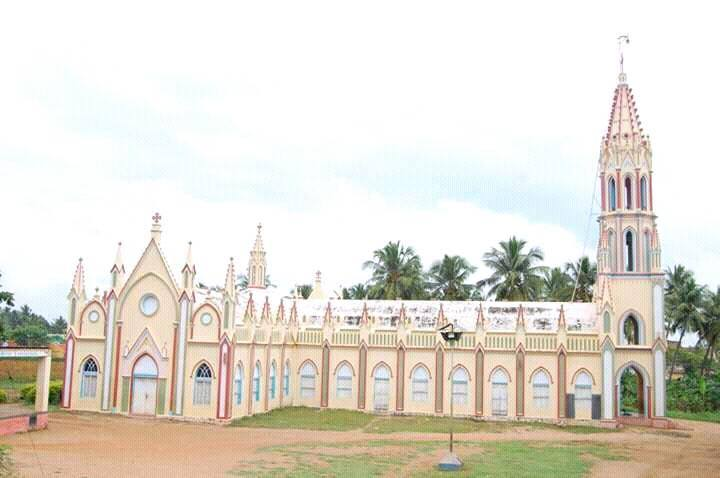
- Nickname: H.R. Kottai
- Interactive map of Anumantharayan Kottai
- Coordinates: 10.343142°N 77.911722°E
- Country: India

Languages
  - Official: Tamil
- Time zone: UTC+5:30 (IST)
- Post-PIN: Anumantharayan Kottai-624002
- Vehicle registration: TN-57
- Lok Sabha: Dindigul
- constituency: Athoor
- Panchayat: Anumantharayan Kottai
- Block: Rettiyarchatram
- Taluk: Dindigul

Anumantharayan Kottai is a village in Dindigul District in the Indian state of Tamil Nadu. It is on the Dindigul–Kodaikanal Highway, 8 kilometres (5.0 mi) from Dindigul. The nearest railway station is Dindigul, and the nearest airport is Madurai.

== Church ==
The world's first church built for St. Ignatius is in Anumantharayan Kottai (அனுமந்தராயன்கோட்டை). It was blessed on 31 July 1822.

== Education ==
- Infant Jesus Nursery School
- Sacred Heart Boy's Primary School
- RC Sirumalar Girls Primary School
- Loyola Higher Secondary School.
- CRAYON ( child relief and research Institute) alternative learning centers.

== Hospitals ==
- P S R Specialty Hospital
- Govt. Primary Health Centre
- St. Mary of Leuca Hospital

== Government offices ==
- Village Panchayat Office
- Village Administrative Office.

== Petrol bunk ==
Bharat Petroleum Petrol bunk is in the village.

== Services ==
- Canara Bank
- Post Office
