= Velampatty =

- village
- Location within Tamil Nadu Location within India
- Coordinates: 9.434474°N 77.751646°E
- Country: India
- State: Tamil Nadu

Languages
  - Official: Tamil
- Time zone: UTC+5:30 (IST)

Velampatty is a small village in Dindigul district of Tamil Nadu. It is situated along the Palani-Tharapuram Highway, between Thoppampatty and Thasanaiken Patty. The nearest railway station is in Palani, about 16 kilometers away. Nearest airport is Coimbatore, 85 km away.
