= Sithayankottai =

- Town
- Location in Tamil Nadu, India
- Coordinates: 10°17′48″N 77°49′10″E
- Country: India
- State: Tamil Nadu
- District: Dindigul

Population (2001)
  - Total: 12,052

Languages
  - Official: Tamil
- Time zone: UTC+5:30 (IST)

Sithayankottai is a panchayat town in Dindigul district in the Indian state of Tamil Nadu.

== Demographics ==
As of 2001 India census, Sithayankottai had a population of 12,052. Males constitute 50% of the population and females 50%. Sithayankottai has an average literacy rate of 80%, higher than the national average of 59.5%: male literacy is 69%, and female literacy is 51%. In Sithayankottai, 11% of the population is under 6 years of age.
