= Viruveedu =

Viruveedu [Pronounced 'Viru Veedu'] is a developed panchayat village in Dindigul district in the state of Tamil Nadu, India. Viruveedu is located near the town of Batlagundu, at the border of Dindigul District in southwestern Tamil Nadu. Viruveedu is a Mid point of multiple villages...

== Transport ==
Viruveedu is approximately 49 kilometres from Dindigul, and 12 kilometers from Batlagundu by road. There are regular buses from Batlagundu, Usilampatti and Arappalyam bus stands. Kodaikanal Road railway station is on the Chennai-Madurai main railway. Govern Bus Tenkasi to Palani and Senkottai to Palani goes via Viruveedu.

== Agriculture ==
Local farms cultivate jasmine, kolikondai flower and also many vegetables like drum stick (murungaikaai) and avarai, etc. The drum stick is main cultivation in this area which is sent to Koyembedu market in Chennai daily (i.e. more than 2–3 lorries)

== Facilities ==
The village has a government model higher secondary school, Panjayat Union School (up to 5th standard) police station, - Vilampatty Control, Nilakottai TK canara bank, post office Govt. primary health care center as well. Three temples - Kaliamman, Bagavathiamman and Muthalamman is located in this village. Panguni Pongal is conducted every year in Tamil month Ponguni (April Month). In addition, Viruveedu is one of the main junction place for more than 10 villages around it.

== Population ==
Roughly 5500+ peoples are living in viruveedu with all type of regionals.

== Major Usage ==
The Major and Middle Point in Usilampatti to Bathlagundu.. It merge much more villages..
