= Sriramapuram =

Sriramapuram SugarCane City
- Town
- Location in Tamil Nadu, India
- Coordinates: 10°31′03″N 77°58′13″E
- Country: India
- State: Tamil Nadu
- District: Dindigul

Population (2001)
  - Total: 8,927

Languages
  - Official: Tamil
- Time zone: UTC+5:30 (IST)

Sriramapuram is a panchayat town in Dindigul district in the Indian state of Tamil Nadu.

== Demographics ==
As of 2001 India census, Sriramapuram had a population of 8927. Males constitute 50% of the population and females 50%. Sriramapuram has an average literacy rate of 53%, lower than the national average of 59.5%: male literacy is 63%, and female literacy is 44%. In Sriramapuram, 11% of the population is under 6 years of age.
