= Kodaikanal division =

Coordinates: 10.23°N 77.48°E

Kodaikanal division is a revenue division in the Dindigul district of Tamil Nadu, India.
