= Mandavadi =

Coordinates: 10°35′N 77°42′E

- village
- Interactive map of Mandavadi
- Country: India
- State: Tamil Nadu
- District: Dindigul

Languages
  - Official: Tamil
- Time zone: UTC+5:30 (IST)
- PIN: 624612
- Telephone code: 04553-
- Vehicle registration: TN-57
- Coastline: 0 kilometres (0 mi)
- Nearest city: Coimbatore, Madurai, Erode, Karur
- Lok Sabha constituency: Dindigul
- Avg. summer temperature: 36 °C (97 °F)

Mandavadi is a village in Dindigul municipality, Tamil Nadu, India. The main occupation in Mandavadi is farming.
