= Sevugampatti =

Sevugampatti Batlagundu suburb
- sub urban
- Nickname: வத்தலக்குண்டு புறநகர்
- Location in Tamil Nadu, India
- Coordinates: 10°11′29″N 77°47′06″E
- Country: India
- State: Tamil Nadu
- District: Dindigul

Government
  - Type: Town panchayat
  - Body: Sevugampatti First grade Town panchayat

Area
  - Total: 7 km^{2} (2.7 sq mi)
  - Rank: 1

Population (2011)
  - Total: 13,402

Languages
  - Vathalagundukaran: Tamil
- Time zone: UTC+5:30 (IST)
- Postal code: 624211
- Vehicle registration: TN57 BZ

Sevugampatti is a panchayat town in Dindigul district in the Indian state of Tamil Nadu.Sevugampatti is a suburb of Batlagundu.

== Demographics ==
As of the 2001 India census, Sevugampatti had a population of 9521. Males constitute 51% of the population and females 49%. Sevugampatti has an average literacy rate of 65%, higher than the national average of 59.5%: male literacy is 74%, and female literacy is 55%. In Sevugampatti, 11% of the population is under 6 years of age.
