= Pandrimalai =

Coordinates: 10.3409°N 77.7523°E

Pandrimalai is a village panchayat located in the Dindigul district of Tamil Nadu, India. The latitude 10.3627476 and longitude 77.99234 are the geocoordinate of the Pandrimalai. Chennai is the state capital for Pandrimalai village. It is located around 393.6 kilometer away from Pandrimalai. The other nearest state capital from Pandrimalai is Thiruvananthapuram and its distance is 226.6 km. The other surrounding state capitals are Thiruvananthapuram 226.6 km., Pondicherry 266.4 km., Bangalore 294.4 km.,

The surrounding nearby villages and its distance from Pandrimalai are Kuttathupatti 10.5 km, Silvarpatti 13.2 km, Alagupatti 16.0 km, Kothapulli 17.1 km, Pudupatti ( T) 19.0 km, Neelamalaikottai 24.7 km, Ponnimanthurai, Dharmathupatti, Ammapatti, Puduchatram, Karisalpatti, Kamatchipuram. Pandrimalai swamigal is doing poojas in the surrounding temples.

== The official language of Pandrimalai ==
The native language of Pandrimalai is Tamil and most of the village people speak Tamil. Pandrimalai people use Tamil language for communication.

== Pandrimalai Sun rise time ==
Pandrimalai village is located in the UTC 5.30 time zone and it follows Indian standard time (IST). Pandrimalai sun rise time varies 18 minutes from IST. The vehicle driving side in Pandrimalai is left, all vehicles should take left side during driving. Pandrimalai people are using its national currency which is Indian Rupee and its international currency code is INR. Pandrimalai phones and mobiles can be accessed by adding the Indian country dialing code +91 from abroad. Pandrimalai people are following the dd/mm/yyyy date format in day-to-day life. Pandrimalai domain name extension (cTLD) is '.in'.

== The nearest railway station in and around Pandrimalai ==
The nearest railway station to Pandrimalai is Dindigul Jn which is located in and around 45.0 kilometer distance. The following table shows other railway stations and its distance from Mamakudi.

- Dindigul Jn railway station – 45.0 km km.
- Vellodu railway station – 39.0 km km.
- Ambathurai railway station – 42.0 km km.
- Eriodu railway station – 63.0 km km.
- Kodaikanal Road railway station – 60.0 km km.

== Nearest airport to Pandrimalai ==
Pandrimalai's nearest airport is Madurai Airport situated at 59.3 km distance. Few more airports around Pandrimalai are as follows.

- Madurai Airport – 70.3 km.
- Tiruchirapalli International Airport – 117.0 km.
- Sulur Air Force Station – 130.1 km.
- Coimbatore International Airport - 155.0 km.

== Nearest districts to Pandrimalai ==
Pandrimalai is located around 0.8 kilometer away from its district headquarter dindigul. The other nearest district headquarters is Pudukkottai situated at 42.0 km distance from Pandrimalai. Surrounding districts from Pandrimalai are as follows:

- Madurai district – 51.2 km.
- Karur district – 67.1 km.
- Theni district – 68.3 km.
- Sivaganga district – 76.5 km.

== Nearest town/city to Pandrimalai ==
Pandrimalai's nearest town/city/important place is Dindigul located at the distance of 0.8 kilometer. Surrounding town/city/TP/CT from Pandrimalai are as follows:

- Madurai

– 57 km.

- Thadikombu – 55 km.
- Oddanchatram - 51 km.
- Adalur 6.9 km.
- Chinnalapatti – 51 km.
- Pattiveeranpatti – 50 km.

== Schools in and around Pandrimalai ==
Pandrimalai nearest schools are as follows:

- Smb School – 0.5 km.
- Prnp Vidya Mandhir Matriculation School – 0.7 km.
- Dudley Higher Secondary School – 1.7 km.
- Kennedy Matriculation School – 1.7 km.
- Jk Metriculation Higher Secondary School – 2.1 km.

== Pincode ==
- Post Office: PANDRIMALAI
- Post Office Type: BRANCH OFFICE
- District: DINDIGUL
- State: TAMIL NADU
- Pin Code: 624212 (Click to see all Post Offices with same Pin Code)
- Post office Address: Postmaster, Post Office PANDRIMALAI (BRANCH OFFICE), DINDIGUL, TAMIL NADU (TN), India (IN), Pin Code:- 624212
