= Thoppampatti block =

Thoppampatti block is a revenue block in the Dindigul district of Tamil Nadu, India. It has a total of 38 panchayat villages.
