= Nilakkottai taluk =

Coordinates: 10.17°N 77.87°E

Nilakkottai taluk is a taluk of Dindigul district of the Indian state of Tamil Nadu. The headquarters of the taluk is the town of Nilakkottai.

== Demographics ==
According to the 2011 census, the taluk of Nilakkottai had a population of 286,591 with 144,479 males and 142,111 females. There were 984 women for every 1000 men. The taluk had a literacy rate of 69.18. Child population in the age group below 6 was 14,387 Males and 13,498 Females.
