= Eriodu =

- Panchayat town
- Location in Tamil Nadu, India
- Coordinates: 10.533°N 78.067°E
- Country: India
- State: Tamil Nadu
- District: Dindigul
- Zone: Madurai

Area
  - Total: 15 km^{2} (5.8 sq mi)
- Elevation: 260 m (850 ft)

Population (2001)
  - Total: 7,866
  - Density: 520/km^{2} (1,400/sq mi)

Languages
  - Official: Tamil
- Time zone: UTC+5:30 (IST)
- PIN: 624702
- Telephone code: 91 4551
- Vehicle registration: TN 57
- Literacy: 66%
- Website: www.eriyodu.thiyagaraaj.com

Eriodu is a panchayat town located in Dindigul district in the state of Tamil Nadu, India. Eriodu is located in Dindigul next to Karur State Highway road (SH 74). There are ten dependent villages scattered around Eriodu.

== Geography ==
Eriodu has an average elevation of 260 metres (850 ft).

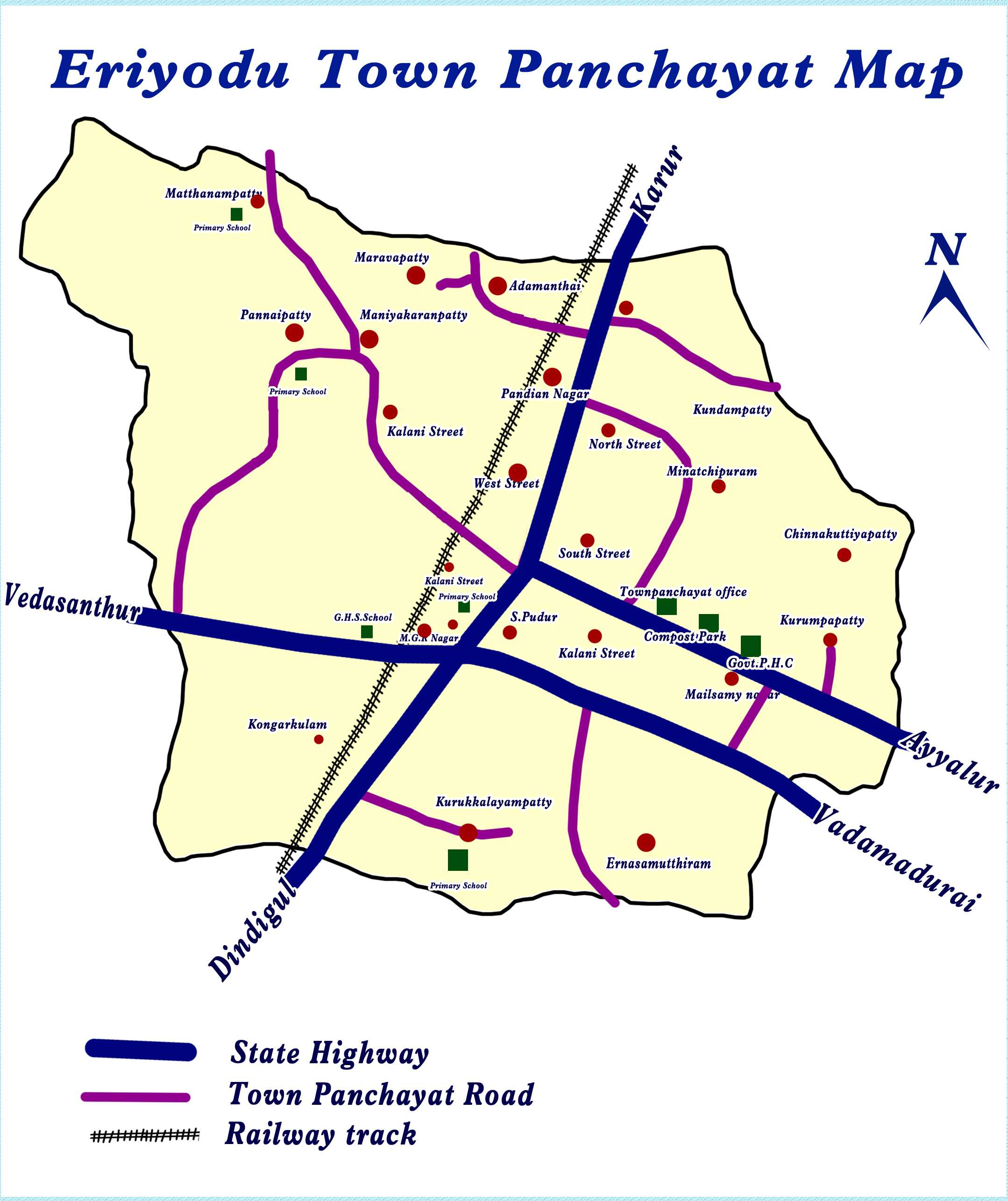

== Demographics ==
In the 2001 India census, Eriodu had a population of 7866. Males constituted 51% of the population and females 49%. Eriodu has an average literacy rate of 66%. Literacy for males was 76% and literacy for females was 55%.

== Politics ==
Eriodu Assembly Constituency is part of Karur Lok Sabha constituency.

Eriodu is a part of Vedasandur legislative assembly constituency.
