= Odaipatty =

Coordinates: 10.584°N 77.778°E

Odaipatty is a village located near Oddanchatram in Dindigul district, State of Tamil Nadu, India. The major job of this village is cultivation/farming; mostly vegetables which are Tomato, Drumstick, Brinjal, Ladies finger, Red Chilly and Green Chilly. Vegetables will be sold to the Oddanchatram Vegetable market which is famous in Tamil Nadu and major exporter of vegetables to the State of Kerala.
