= Ayyampalayam, Dindigul =

Ayyampalayam Ayyampalayam
- Town
- Nickname: Ayyam
- Location in Tamil Nadu, India
- Coordinates: 10°14′17″N 77°43′12″E
- Country: India
- State: Tamil Nadu
- District: Dindigul

Population (2001)
  - Total: 12,131

Languages
  - Official: Tamil
- Time zone: UTC+5:30 (IST)

Ayyampalayam is a panchayat town in Aathoor Taluk in Dindigul district in the state of Tamil Nadu, India. There also exists another village by the same name, in the Dindigul district in Tamil Nadu. For the Ayyampalayam in Dindigul district.

This village is located at the foothill of Kodaikanal. Marudanathi dam is very nearer to this village and through which around 3,000 acres (12 km^{2}) of lands gets irrigated.

== Demographics ==
As of 2001 India census, Ayyampalayam had a population of 12,131. Males constitute 50% of the population and females 50%. Iyyampalayam has an average literacy rate of 62%, higher than the national average of 59.5%; with 56% of the males and 44% of females literate. 11% of the population is under 6 years of age.

Persons from this village have joined in the INA founded by Nethaji Subash Chandra Bose. The forefathers of Dr. Subramania Siva lived in this village.

== Culture ==
Pongal festival during the month of January, jallikattu competition will be held with great enthusiasm.

== Transportation ==
This village is connected by road.

== Economy ==
The economy of the village is primarily based on agriculture. The major crops cultivated are coconuts, Bananas, Mangoes, lemons, cocoa, cashewnut and nutmug supported by irrigation from nearby dams and borewells. Livestock such as cattle, poultry and goats also contribute to household income. In recent years, many youth have migrated to nearby towns for employment in construction, retail, and service sectors. Self-help groups and cooperative banks play a role in micro-finance and women’s entrepreneurship.

== Education ==
N.P.Ramasamy Memorial Higher Secondary School is the local school.

== Religion ==
The ancient Muthalamman Temple festival has been headed by Thiru. Alappa Gounder's family for over 400 years. It takes placeover a period of three days from Wednesday to Friday, with Wednesday night being the most important. On this night, the villagers bring a silk cloth covered goddess statue from Thevarapanpatti. They remove the silk and perform the eye opening ritual (prana prathisdai) , and decorate the goddess in Alappa gowder's house before moving it to the main temple where the festival begins. On Friday the final araathi is offered to the godess by the Alappa Gounder family. The Sadayandi swami petti festival is equally important. The Periya Ayyanar temple, located on the bank of the Marudanathi river, is also a worth seeing place. Additionally, a portrait of Pandit Nehru was given divine status in this temple; a testament to the patriotic spirit of the village.

The two temples in Ayyampalayam are Arulmigu Angalaeswariamman Thirukovil and Muthalamman Temple.

Arulmigu Angalaeswariamman Thirukovil is located near kattabomman Thidal, Chinna Ayyampalayam. Maha Shivratri is an important day for the temple, and this festival is celebrated in a grandiose manner. Initially, the villagers will decorate and pray to a sacred wooden box, more than 150 years old, containing sacred items. The people then head to the temple, and adorn the goddess with a silk saree and flowers, and offer foods such as Pongal, pulses, fruits, sweets, tamarind juice. On the following day, Pongal is prepared, a sacrificial ceremony is held, and food is distributed to the poor.

Notable temples:

- Peria Muthalamman Temple
- Chinna Muthalamman Temple
- Pattathu Vinayagar Temple
- Krishnar Temple
- Kuttikaradu Murugan Temple
- Solaieswaran Temple
- MalaiAmman Temple
- Seelakari Amman Temple
- Kaliangali Amman Temple
- Periya Ayyanar Temple
- Sadaiyandi Temple
- Rakatchi Amman Temple
- Lakshmi Narayanar Temple
- Angalamman Temple
- Chinnaman Temple
- Perumal Temple
- Veetaikaran Temple
- Sangulla Mayandi Temple
- Chinnala Nayakar Temple
- Bagavathi amman Temple
- Kaliamman Temple
- Vasavi Amman Temple
- Vanadevathai Temple
- Akkumari Amman Temple
