= Palayam, Dindigul district =

Coordinates: 10°43′33″N 78°08′10″E

Palayam is a town panchayat in Dindigul district in the Indian state of Tamil Nadu. It falls under Vedasandur Assembly constituency and Karur Lok Sabha constituency.

== Geography ==
Palayam town panchayat is 40 km from Dindigul, Dindigul district headquarters; It is also 35 km from Karur.

== Demographies ==
As of 2011 census, the municipality has 3,686 houses and a population of 15,336, an area of 25.10 km^{2} and 15 wards. Also, the municipality has a literacy rate of 71.9% and a sex ratio of 988 females per 1,000 males. Child Sex Ratio There are 895 female children per 1000 male children. Scheduled Castes and Scheduled Tribes are 1,525 and 1 respectively.
