= Keeranur, Dindigul =

Keeranur
- Town
- Location in Tamil Nadu, India
- Coordinates: 10°36′52″N 77°30′06″E
- Country: India
- State: Tamil Nadu
- District: Dindigul

Population (2001)
  - Total: 6,299

Languages
  - Official: Tamil
- Time zone: UTC+5:30 (IST)
- Postal code: 624617

Keeranur is a panchayat town in Dindigul district in the Indian state of Tamil Nadu. It is situated between Palani and Dharapuram. There are more than three places in Tamil Nadu and in the rest of India with the same name, a bigger Keeranur situated near Trichy.

== Demographics ==
At the 2001 census, Keeranur had a population of 6,299, with males constituting 49% of the population and females 51%. 12% of the population is under 6 years of age.

Keeranur has an average literacy rate of 57%, lower than the national average of 59.5%; male literacy is 63%, and female literacy is 50%.

== Education ==
A higher secondary school, middle school, primary school and a girls' school are located in this village. Samarasa Sudda Sanmarga Sangam was formed by Ramalinga Vallalar, is now under the management of Kuppuswamy. The S. K. education foundation helps financially disadvantaged students from all communities.

== Occupation ==
The main occupation of this village is Agriculture. More than 65% of the population is involved in the agriculture industry. About 1,500 acres (6.1 km^{2}) of wetlands are available at the Shanmuga river basin. A tank Alangulam holds seasonal water for agricultural purposes.

== Religion ==
In Keeranur Hindus, Muslims and Christians live together in harmony.

There are several Hindu temples in the area. The old temple in keeranur village Thirumalai Bahavan.

Keeranur has a prominent old mosque called Big Mosque(MMPS) which has two very high minarets, which is also called as "Chinna Mecca".

An old Christian church fell to ruin, although a small church is constructed.
