= Neikkarapatti =

- village
- Location in Tamil Nadu, India
- Coordinates: 10°27′54″N 77°26′36″E
- Country: India
- State: Tamil Nadu
- District: Dindigul

Population (2001)
  - Total: 11,891

Languages
  - Official: Tamil
- Time zone: UTC+5:30 (IST)

Neikkarapatti is a panchayat town in Dindigul district in the Indian state of Tamil Nadu.

== Demographics ==
As of 2001 India census, Neikkarapatti had a population of 11,891. Males constitute 50% of the population and females 50%. Neikkarapatti has an average literacy rate of 65%, higher than the national average of 59.5%: male literacy is 75%, and female literacy is 55%. In Neikkarapatti, 9% of the population is under 6 years of age.

== Educational institutions ==
There are a total of five main schools in Neikkarapatti. They are Guruvappa higher secondary school, Sri Renugadevi Higher Secondary School, Crescent Matriculation School, P.R.G. Velappa Naidu Matriculation Higher Secondary School and Ramachandira international public school(CBSE). Guruvappa Higher Secondary School was established in 1969. Until last decade, this school was the only higher secondary school for the western part of Palani Taluk. Arulmigu Palani Andavar Arts College for Women, Sri Subramaniya College of Engineering are also near the village.

== Neikarapatti Palace ==
There is famous palace in Neikarapatti called as Periya Veedu which is a shooting spot of South Indian film industries. Agriculture and Jaggery production had been a major occupation for many centuries which eventually came down due to rapid urbanization and insufficient water source. It has own dam called porundhalaaru which is near to this village and has 6 ponds and also a few streams runs across neikarapatti. Shri High court Badhra Kali amman festival is considered to be special here. And one of the famous dams "Palar-Porundhalar dam" in palani is located here. It is the main source of drinking water and agriculture.
