= T. Saminathan =

T. Saminathan is an Indian politician and member of Dravida Munnetra Kazhagam (DMK). He is the elected Member of the Legislative Assembly (MLA) for the Vedasandur Assembly constituency in Dindigul district, Tamil Nadu, having won the seat in the 2026 Tamil Nadu Legislative Assembly election.
