= Asankodai =

Village in India

Asankodai is a village in India with around 30 families. It comes under Perumpallam Panchayat, Kodaikanal taluk, Dindigul district, Tamil Nadu, India.

Asankodai village is without road facilities and is surrounded by Thandikudi by north, Pachalur by south KC Patty by east and Perumpallam by west. This place was a dense forest where few lands are used for cultivation land and remaining land occupied by government to plant eucalyptus trees.

The people need to walk around 7 miles (11 km) to get basic necessities. It takes nearly one and a half hours to reach the nearby villages but the best thing is they have Power and telephone facilities.

Recent days forest and Police department agreed to have a mud road. So the people now started using four wheel drive vehicles and even skilled two wheelers to reach the nearby village Thandikudi.

== Agriculture ==
The main cultivation here is Coffee plantations. Also they are cultivating orange, Lemon, Banana, Jack fruit and Butter fruit.

== Attractions ==
Its quite a greenish area located at an elevation of 1,700 meters (5,600 ft) above sea level. There is no public transport facilities to this village. As of now you can hire a jeep or you can still reach the village by trekking.

The main attraction in this village is the Kathuvumalai Nathan Siva Temple, located on a hill. It is necessary to walk to reach the temple. Every year, on 14 April (Tamil new year), there is a celebration in the temple. There is also a Kali temple which has another route which is more quick but far.

== Education ==
There is a primary school from grades 1 to 5, with two classrooms, a library, and a playground, but no computers for teaching or learning. The school can be accessed via an all-weather road. Instruction is in the Tamil language. Pupils move to a nearby village to continue their higher studies.
