= Oddanchatram taluk =

Coordinates: 10°29′18″N 77°44′05″E

Oddanchatram taluk is a taluk of Dindigul district of the Indian state of Tamil Nadu. The headquarters of the taluk is the town of Oddanchatram.

== Demographics ==
According to the 2011 census, the taluk of Oddanchatram had a population of 182,143 with 91,248 males and 90,895 females. There were 996 women for every 1,000 men. The taluk had a literacy rate of 67.98%. The child population younger than 6 years were 6,868 males and 6,356 females.

== Gandhi Market ==
Gandhi Market is the biggest market in Tamil Nadu state from which vegetables are exported to other states and cities. The commission agents play a major role in transport and sale.The Gandhi market is dominated by 24manai Telugu Chettiars community followed by Kongu vellala Gounders, Naidus and Few Vokkaligas.24Manai Telugu Chettiyars are pioneer in establishing the Oddanchatram Gandhi Market.
