= Narikkalpatti =

Narikkalpatti is a village in the Dindigul District of the South Indian state of Tamil Nadu, located 11 km from Palani. The River Shanmuganadhi flows through this village. At the time of the Census of India 2001, Narikkalpatti had a population of more than 4500 people. The majority of the people belong to the Kongu Vellalar Gounder caste and devangars.

The postal code of the village is 624618.

The Union Primary school and a Govt Aided Higher secondary school (CGM) are situated there, as well as Indian overseas bank branch

The main income sources of the village are agriculture and weaving. The main agricultural products include coconuts, rice and sugar cane. The village is located between Dharapuram and Palani via Alangiyam.
