= Balasamudram =

- Town
- Location in Tamil Nadu, India
- Coordinates: 10°23′29″N 77°30′10″E
- Country: India
- State: Tamil Nadu
- District: Dindigul

Population (2001)
  - Total: 12,281

Languages
  - Official: Tamil
- Time zone: UTC+5:30 (IST)

Balasamudram is a panchayat town in Dindigul district in the state of Tamil Nadu, India.

== Demographics ==
As of 2001 India census, Balasamudram had a population of 12,281. Males constitute 51% of the population and females 49%. Balasamudram has an average literacy rate of 53%, lower than the national average of 59.5%; with 61% of the males and 39% of females literate. 10% of the population is under 6 years of age.
