= Vadamadurai =

- Town
- Nickname: Vada
- Location in Tamil Nadu, India
- Coordinates: 10°26′25″N 78°06′00″E
- Country: India
- State: Tamil Nadu
- District: Dindigul
- Zone: Madurai
- Elevation: 275 m (902 ft)

Population (2001)
  - Total: 15,418

Languages
  - Official: Tamil
- Time zone: UTC+5:30 (IST)
- PIN: 624 802
- Telephone code: 91 4551
- Vehicle registration: TN 57
- Sex ratio: 1:1 ♂/♀

Vadamadurai is a panchayat town in Madurai Region at Dindigul district in the Indian state of Tamil Nadu.

== Etymology ==
Vadamadurai is located in 17 Kilometre from Dindigul, on the way to Trichy NH-45. Vadamadurai is a developing town in Dindigul district. The queen named Rani mangammal from Vijayanagar empire was once in this place and built the temples around here. A well which was named for her is situated in the Trichy road of this panchayat town.

The name Vadamadurai is derived from the Tamil word vadakku meaning north. Vada - Madurai thus means north of Madurai; the reason why this village was named this is because the Temple City Madurai has a Kallazhagar festival in its (Vishnu Temple) 'Soundara Raja Perumal Temple', that is also celebrated in the temple of the same lord in Vadamadurai. The significance here is that only these two places in the whole of Tamil Nadu have such a temple with such a festival. The festival runs for 15 days, Aadi Therottam, Muthupallaku and Mattuthavani are important events in the festival. Nearly 18 village Panchayat people are participating every year. 'Mattu Thavani' (it means marketplace) selling bullock and cow during the festival time. Now it is not celebrating because there is not sufficient space and the space was occupied by buildings.

Another festival is very important for 18 village panchayats of Vadamadurai (i.e.) 'Mariyamman Temple Festival' is a fifteen-day festival. The important events are 'Pookkuzhi', 'Theechatti', and 'Molappari'. During the 'Pookuzhi' around 18 village panchayat people are gathered and get down in pookuzhi (collection of wood burning in one big place). And 'Meenakshi Sundareswarar, Kaaliyamman, Muthaalamman and Ayyappan temples are major ones.Now currently panchayat chairman Mrs.Nirubarani ganesan. Nearby villages are Seelapadiyankalam, A.V. Patty, Thennampatti, Tumalakundu, Seethapati, Udayampatti. EB office is located just nearer to the NH45.

== See also ==
- Vadamadurai Assembly Constituency
- Manamadurai
- Madurai
