= Natham =

- Town
- Nickname: natham
- Location in Tamil Nadu, India
- Coordinates: 10.184385°N 78.422159°E
- Country: India
- State: Tamil Nadu
- District: Dindigul
- Zone: Pandya Nadu

Government
  - Body: Town panchayat

Languages
- Time zone: UTC+5:30 (IST)
- PIN: 624 401
- Vehicle registration: TN 57

Natham (Tamil: [nattam]) is a town in Dindigul district in the Indian state of Tamil Nadu.

== Demographics ==
As of 2001 India census, Natham had a population of 22,533. Males constitute 50% of the population and females 50%. Natham has an average literacy rate of 40%, lesser than the national average of 59.5%: male literacy is 36%, and female literacy is 46%. In Natham, 12% of the population is under 6 years of age.
