= Athoor taluk =

Place in Tamil Nadu (India)

Coordinates: 10°17′22″N 77°51′6″E

Athoor taluk is located at a distance of 15 km from Dindigul, in the Indian state of Tamil Nadu. The Kamaraj Reservoir in Athoor is the main source of drinking water for the people of Dindigul.

(Tamil: ஆத்தூர்) is one of the taluk, or administrative division of Dindigul district in the state of Tamil Nadu, India. The division's headquarters is Athoor.

== Demographics ==
According to the 2011 census, the taluk of Athoor had a population of 160,638 with 79,780 males and 80,858 females. There were 1014 women for every 1000 men. The taluk had a literacy rate of 71.99%. Child population in the age group below 6 was 7,090 Males and 6,573 Females.
