= Nilakkottai =

Nilakottai
- town
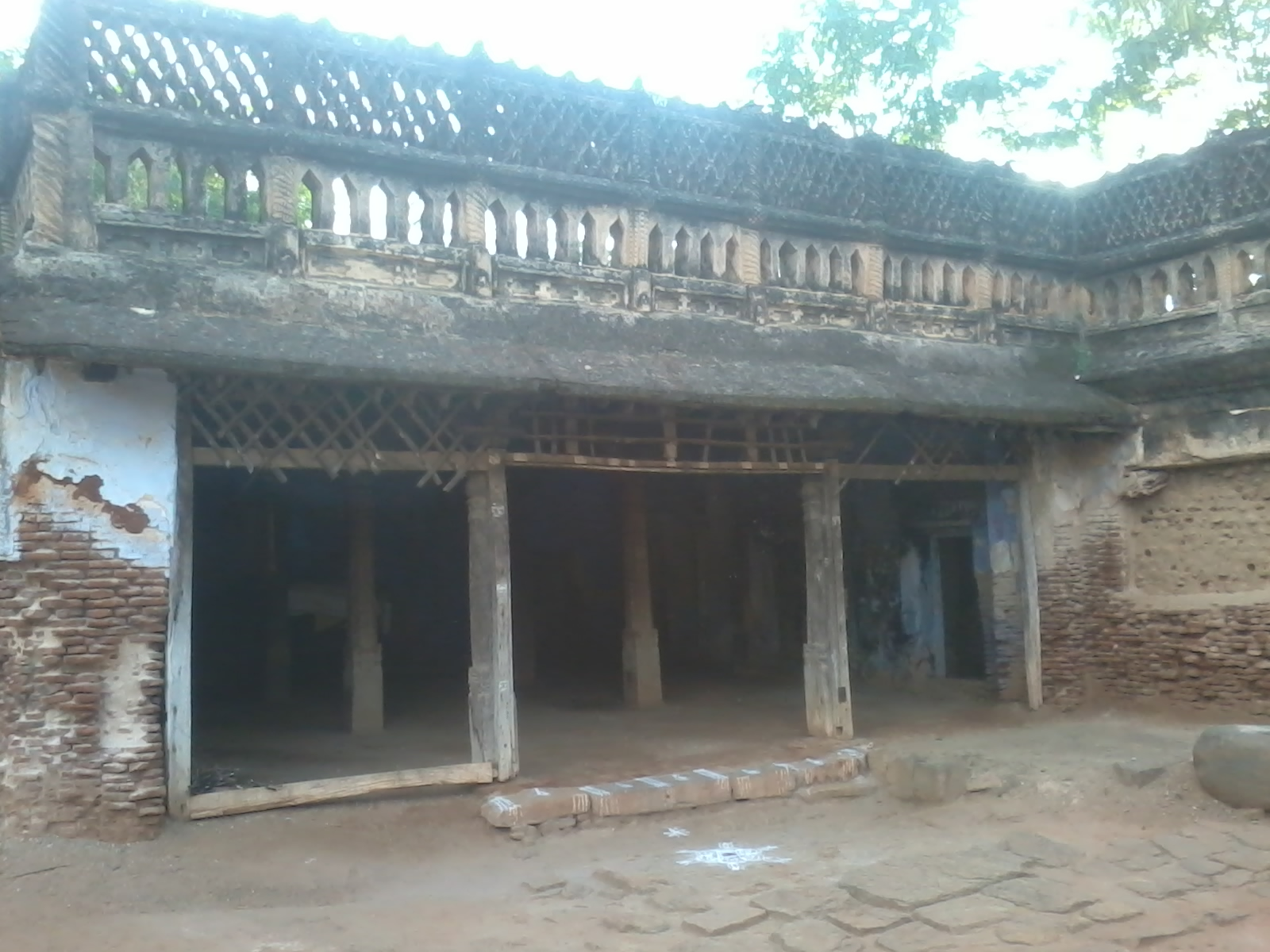
- Nilakottai Palace

- Location in Tamil Nadu, India
- Coordinates: 10.17°N 77.87°E
- Country: India
- State: Tamil Nadu
- Region: Pandya Nadu
- District: Dindigul
- Elevation: 320 m (1,050 ft)

Population
  - Total: 19,630

Languages
  - Official: Tamil
- Time zone: UTC+5:30 (IST)
- Postal code: 624208
- Website: Nilakottai.in

Nilakkottai (also spelled as Nilakottai) is a town in the Dindigul district of the Indian state of Tamil Nadu. The town was established in 1958, as 1st Grade Town Panchayat. In 1970, it was changed to Selection Grade. The Town Panchayat has been under the municipal act since 1996. In 2004, it was called Special Village Panchayat, and in 2006, Selection Grade Town Panchayat.Madurai region's jasmine is famous because of Nilakottai.

== History ==
Nilakottai palayam was one of 26 palayams in Dindigul province. Its founder, Kulappa Nayakkar, came from Vijayanagaram in 1366 A.D. before the period of Vishwanatha Nayakkar.

=== Kulappa Nayakkar ===
Nilakottai consists mainly of arable lands. As a reward for helping repel an invasion, Makkala Nayakkar of the Kambala caste was rewarded by the emperor of Vijayanagar with the land west of Madurai. In these lands, he built a mud fort Nilakkottai in 1366 A.D with permission from lord Krishna Devarayar. Makkala ruled this fort for 12 years until he was succeeded by his son, Kulappa Nayakkar.

Both Kulappa Nayakkar and Pandiya King Chandra Sekara of Madurai were deposed by a Chola Prince named Veera Sekara Chozha. Both defeated rulers appealed to Krishna Deva Raya for help and The Krishna Deva Raya sent Kotikam Nagama Nayakkar to aid them. Nagama Nayakkar defeated the Chola ruler and took Madurai, but suddenly withdrew his allegiance and declined to help the Pandiya king, usurping the throne. The Vijaya Nagar emperor demanded reprisal. Nayakkar's son, Vishwanatha, volunteered. He overthrew his father and handed him over to the emperor. As a reward for his loyalty, the emperor appointed Viswanatha as the governor of Madurai.

During Vishwanatha Nayakkar's rule, Tamil Nadu Kulappa Nayakkar aided him in numerous conflicts. When Pandiya assaulted Madurai country, Kulappa Nayakkar ended their revolt.

After Vishwanatha Nayakkar, Madurai was ruled by Krishnappa Nayakkar (1554–1572).

=== Under British rules ===
Droughts prevented agricultural success in Nilakotttai, so Kulappa Nayakkar was unable to pay his tribute to the British government. The conflict came to a head in 1797 when, after sending his family to Bodinayanakanur, the Polegar gathered forces in Kallarnadu, joined the revolt, and tried unsuccessfully to expel the British garrison from his fort..

== Geography ==
Nilakkottai is located at 10.17°N 77.85°E. It has an average elevation of 320 metres (1049 feet).

== Demographics ==
As of 2001 India census, Nilakkottai had a population of 19,630. Males constitute 50% of the population and females 50%. Nilakkottai has an average literacy rate of 71%, higher than the national average of 59.5%: male literacy is 76%, and female literacy is 66%. In Nilakkottai, 12% of the population is under 6 years of age.

== Economy ==
Nilakottai is famous for its flower markets, which export to all parts of India and overseas. Madurai region's jasmine is famous because of Nilakottai. Nilakottai was in Madurai district but later joined the Dindugal district. Nilakottai is also famous for its brass vessels and goldsmiths. There is an industrial estate established by SIPCOT, which features manufacturing and assembling units such as Fenner (India) limited, Dharani Rubber private limited, Amway, and TAFE Tractor Company. International Agricultural Processing Private Limited (IAP), a leading vegetables processing company focussed on 100% exports, is located in Musavanuthu village, Nilakottai.

== Government ==
Nilakottai assembly constituency (Reserved) is part of Dindigul (Lok Sabha constituency).

== Education ==
=== Public and private schools ===
- Damien Public School, Tamil Nadu
- Royal Nursery & Primary school
- Karunai Dhan Nps, Nilakottai Primary School
- St. Joseph's Primary School, Batlagundu
- HNUPR Matriculation Higher Secondary School Nilakottai
- Kumarappa Chettiar Memorial Matriculation Higher Secondary School Nilakottai
- swami vivekananda higher secondary school silukkuvarpatti
- Diraviam Government Girls Higher Secondary School Kamalapuram
- HNUPR Girls Higher Secondary School Nilakottai
- R. C. Higher Secondary School Michealpalayam
- R. C. Higher Secondary School Silukkuvarpatti
- Jeya Matriculation School, Bangalpatty
- Nadar High School, Nilakottai
- Nadar Middle School, Nilakottai, Tamil Nadu
- St. Josephs Middle School Silukkuvarpatti

=== Higher education ===
- Government Arts College For Women, Nilakottai (Affiliated to Mother Teresa Women's University, Kodaikanal)
- Sri Soorya Group of Institutions Kulathupatty

== Hospitals ==
- Government Hospital
- ESI Dispensary
- Muthu multi-specialty hospital
- Valarmathi Clini
- Jaishree Clinic
- Baagyalakshmi Hospital
- Selvaraj Hospital
- Sri Palaniyappa Hospital
- D34 Dental Hospital
