= Palani block =

Coordinates: 10.45°N 77.52°E

Palani block is a revenue block in the Dindigul district of Tamil Nadu, India. It has a total of 20 panchayat villages.
