= Kannivadi, Dindigul =

Kannivadi
- Town
- Location in Tamil Nadu, India
- Coordinates: 10.379°N 77.830°E
- Country: India
- State: Tamil Nadu
- District: Dindigul
- Taluk: Dindigul west taluk

Population (2001)
  - Total: 10,397

Languages
  - Official: Tamil
- Time zone: UTC+5:30 (IST)
- Postal code: 624705
- Vehicle registration: TN57

Kannivadi is a panchayat town in Dindigul District in madurai Division,

Kannivadi is one of the largest town panchayats in India, Thoni Malai is a ward in Kannivadi panchayat, which is 25 km from Kannivadi.

Kannivadi was one of the largest towns in Madurai district before it was divided into Dindigul district .

Kannivadi the border of Pandiyanadu

== Demographics ==
As of 2001 India census, Kannivadi had a population of 10,397. Males constituted 50% of the population and females 50%. Kannivadi has an average literacy rate of 65%, higher than the national average of 59.5%: male literacy is 76%, and female literacy is 54%. In Kannivadi, 10% of the population is under 6 years of age.
