= Dindigul division =

Coordinates: 10.35°N 77.95°E

Dindigul division is a revenue division in the Dindigul district of Tamil Nadu, India.
