= Palani taluk =

Administrative division in Tamil Nadu, India

Coordinates: 10.45°N 77.52°E

Palani taluk is a taluk of Dindigul district of the Indian state of Tamil Nadu. The headquarters of the taluk is the town of Palani.

== Demographics ==
According to the 2011 census, the taluk of Palani had a population of 290,924 with 145,091 males and 145,833 females. There were 1,005 women for every 1,000 men. The taluk had a literacy rate of 69.25%. Child population in the age group below 6 years were 12,358 males and 11,731 females.
