= Oddanchatram =

- Town
- Location in Tamil Nadu, India
- Coordinates: 10.4800°N 77.7500°E
- Country: India
- State: Tamil Nadu
- Region: Kongu Nadu
- District: Dindigul

Government
  - Type: Municipality
  - Body: Oddanchatram Municipal Council
  - Chairman: Thirumalaisamy

Population (2011)
  - Total: 30,064

Languages
  - Official: Tamil
- Time zone: UTC+5:30 (IST)
- PIN: 624619
- Telephone code: 04553
- Vehicle registration: TN 94Z (before TN57)
- Website: oddanchatram.in

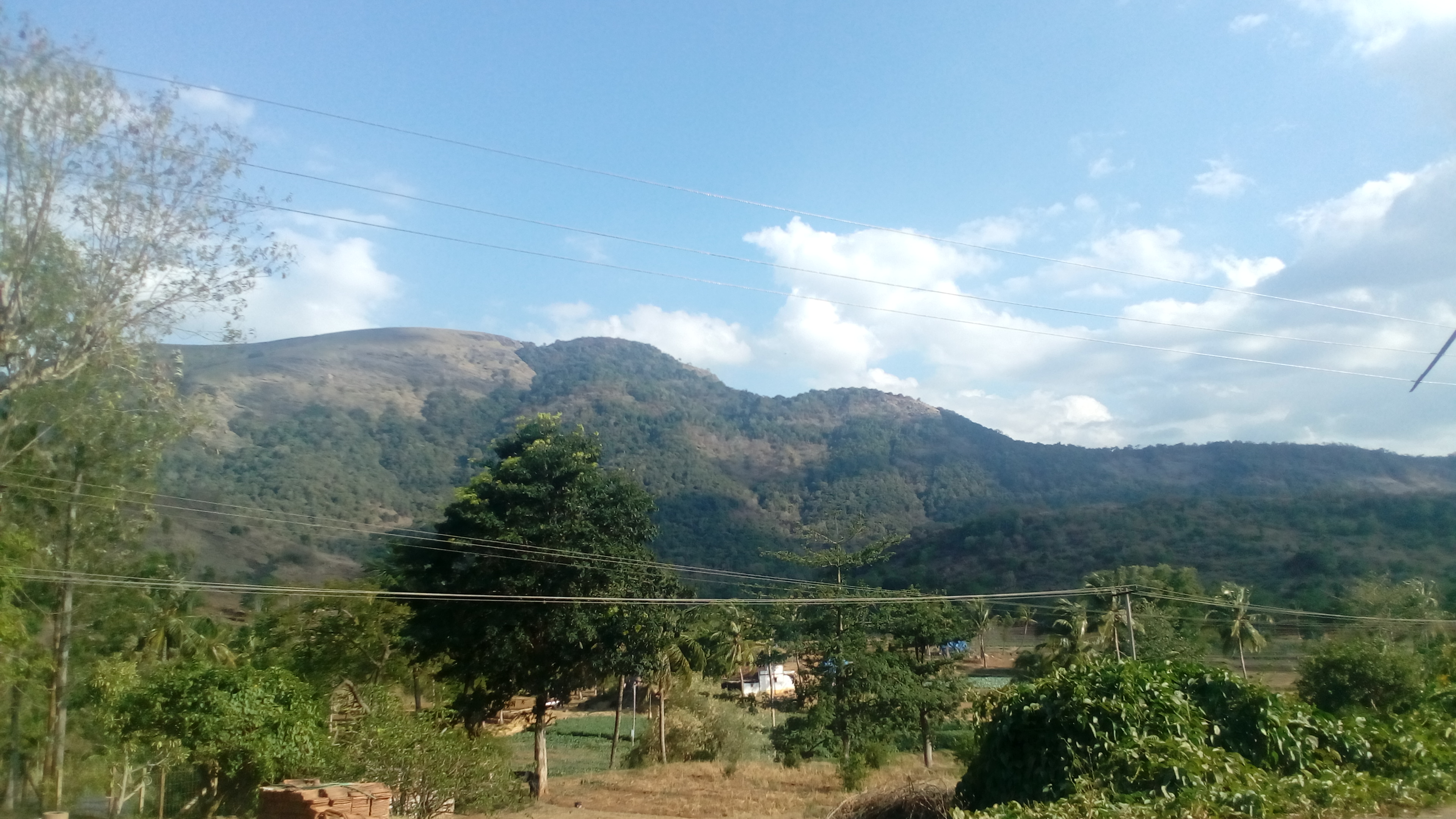
Hills nature place

Oddanchatram (Tamil: [oʈʈansattiɾam]) is a town in the Dindigul district of Tamil Nadu.

== Overview ==
Oddanchatram is a municipality and major agricultural trading town located in Dindigul district in the Indian state of Tamil Nadu. Situated at the foothills of the Palani Hills, the town serves as an important commercial, transportation and educational centre in western Tamil Nadu. Popularly known as the "Vegetable City of Tamil Nadu", Oddanchatram is home to one of the state's largest wholesale vegetable markets.

The town functions as a major collection, distribution and logistics centre for agricultural produce cultivated in the plains and hill regions of Dindigul district. Vegetables from the surrounding villages and the Kodaikanal hills are traded and transported to markets across Tamil Nadu and neighbouring states. The municipality acts as a regional service centre for numerous surrounding villages by providing educational, healthcare, administrative and commercial facilities. Its strategic location on the Dindigul-Palani-Kodaikanal corridor has contributed significantly to its economic growth and urban development. Surrounded by fertile agricultural lands and scenic views of the Western Ghats, Oddanchatram combines a strong agricultural economy with access to tourism, making it one of the most important towns in Dindigul district.

== History ==
The history of Oddanchatram is closely linked to the agrarian development of western Tamil Nadu. Historically, the town formed part of the erstwhile Madurai district and developed as an important trading centre due to its location between the fertile plains of Dindigul and the Palani Hills. On 15 September 1985, Dindigul district was carved out of the composite Madurai district by the Government of Tamil Nadu, after which Oddanchatram became one of the principal municipalities of the newly created district. The town subsequently witnessed significant growth in agricultural trade, transportation and urban development, emerging as one of the largest vegetable marketing centres in Tamil Nadu.

== Demographics ==
According to the 2011 census, Oddanchatram had a population of 30,064 with a gender-ratio of 994 females for every 1,000 males, much above the national average of 929. A total of 2,676 were under the age of six, constituting 1,378 males and 1,298 females. Scheduled Castes and Scheduled Tribes accounted for 20.3% and 0.06% of the population respectively. The average literacy of the town was 77.11%, compared to the national average of 72.99%. The town had a total of 8,046 households. There were a total of 12,738 workers, comprising 1,127 cultivators, 1,983 main agricultural Laboure's, 164 in house hold industries, 9,048 other workers, 416 marginal workers, 9 marginal cultivators, 134 marginal agricultural Laboure's, 16 marginal workers in household industries and 257 other marginal workers. The population of this town increased by 24% from 24,000 in 2001 to 30000 in 2011.

Demographic profile (2011 Census)
Parameter	Value
Population	30,064
Male	15,077
Female	14,987
Sex ratio	994 females per 1,000 males
Literacy rate	84.65%
Households	8,046
Scheduled Castes	20.3%
Scheduled Tribes	0.06%

== Religion ==
Religious composition (2011)
Religion	Percent
Hinduism	88.93%
Islam	5.73%
Christianity	5.21%
Others	0.13%

== Politics ==
As of 2016, 2,23,628 (1,10,979 Males, 1,12,643 Females & 6 Others) voters are in Oddanchatram Constituency.

Oddanchatram (state assembly constituency) is part of Dindigul (Lok Sabha constituency). Oddanchatram elects one MLA to the legislative assembly of the State. R. Sakkarapani from Dravida Munnetra Kazhagam party was elected as the MLA from 1996 to 2021 for consecutive 6 terms, from this state assembly constituency.

wiki isn’t fully supported. Syntax highlighting is based on Plain Text.

=== Members of Legislative Assembly ===
Oddanchatram is represented in the Tamil Nadu Legislative Assembly through the Oddanchatram State Assembly constituency, which forms part of the Dindigul Lok Sabha constituency.

Members of the Legislative Assembly from Oddanchatram Constituency
Election year	MLA	Party
1952	Subramaniya Lakshmipathi Naicker	Independent
1957	Karuthappa Gounder	Indian National Congress
1962	A. Senapathi Gounder	Indian National Congress
1967	N. Gounder	Dravida Munnetra Kazhagam (DMK)
1971	N. Nachimuthu Gounder	Dravida Munnetra Kazhagam (DMK)
1977	A. P. Palaniappan	Indian National Congress
1980	K. Kuppuswamy	All India Anna Dravida Munnetra Kazhagam (AIADMK)
1984	K. Kuppuswamy	All India Anna Dravida Munnetra Kazhagam (AIADMK)
1989	P. Kaliappan	Dravida Munnetra Kazhagam (DMK)
1991	A. T. Chellamuthu	All India Anna Dravida Munnetra Kazhagam (AIADMK)
1996	R. Sakkarapani	Dravida Munnetra Kazhagam (DMK)
2001	R. Sakkarapani	Dravida Munnetra Kazhagam (DMK)
2006	R. Sakkarapani	Dravida Munnetra Kazhagam (DMK)
2011	R. Sakkarapani	Dravida Munnetra Kazhagam (DMK)
2016	R. Sakkarapani	Dravida Munnetra Kazhagam (DMK)
2021	R. Sakkarapani	Dravida Munnetra Kazhagam (DMK)
2026	R. Sakkarapani	Dravida Munnetra Kazhagam (DMK)

== Climate ==
Climate data for Oddanchatram
Month	Jan	Feb	Mar	Apr	May	Jun	Jul	Aug	Sep	Oct	Nov	Dec	Year
Average high °C	29	31	33	35	36	34	33	32	32	31	29	28	32
Average low °C	19	20	22	24	25	24	23	23	23	22	21	20	22
Average rainfall mm	14	11	22	43	65	34	21	31	50	134	138	44	607

== Education ==
Educational infrastructure
Type	Description
Schools	Government, aided and private primary, secondary and higher secondary schools
Higher education	Arts and science colleges, engineering colleges and polytechnic institutions in and around the town
Vocational education	Teacher training institutes and technical training centres

== Transportation ==
Transport connectivity
Mode	Details
Road	Connected to Dindigul, Palani, Madurai, Dharapuram, Karur, Coimbatore and Kodaikanal by state highways and TNSTC services.
Rail	Oddanchatram railway station on the Dindigul–Palani railway line.
Air	Madurai Airport (~90 km), Coimbatore International Airport (~120 km) , Tiruchirappalli International Airport (~160 km)

== Nearby tourist attractions ==
=== Kodaikanal ===
Kodaikanal is a renowned hill station located approximately 50 km from Oddanchatram through the Kodaikanal Ghat Road. Situated in the Palani Hills at an elevation of about 2,133 metres (6,998 ft), it is known for its cool climate, forests, waterfalls and scenic viewpoints. Major attractions include Kodaikanal Lake, Bryant Park, Coaker's Walk, Pillar Rocks, Silver Cascade Falls and Berijam Lake.

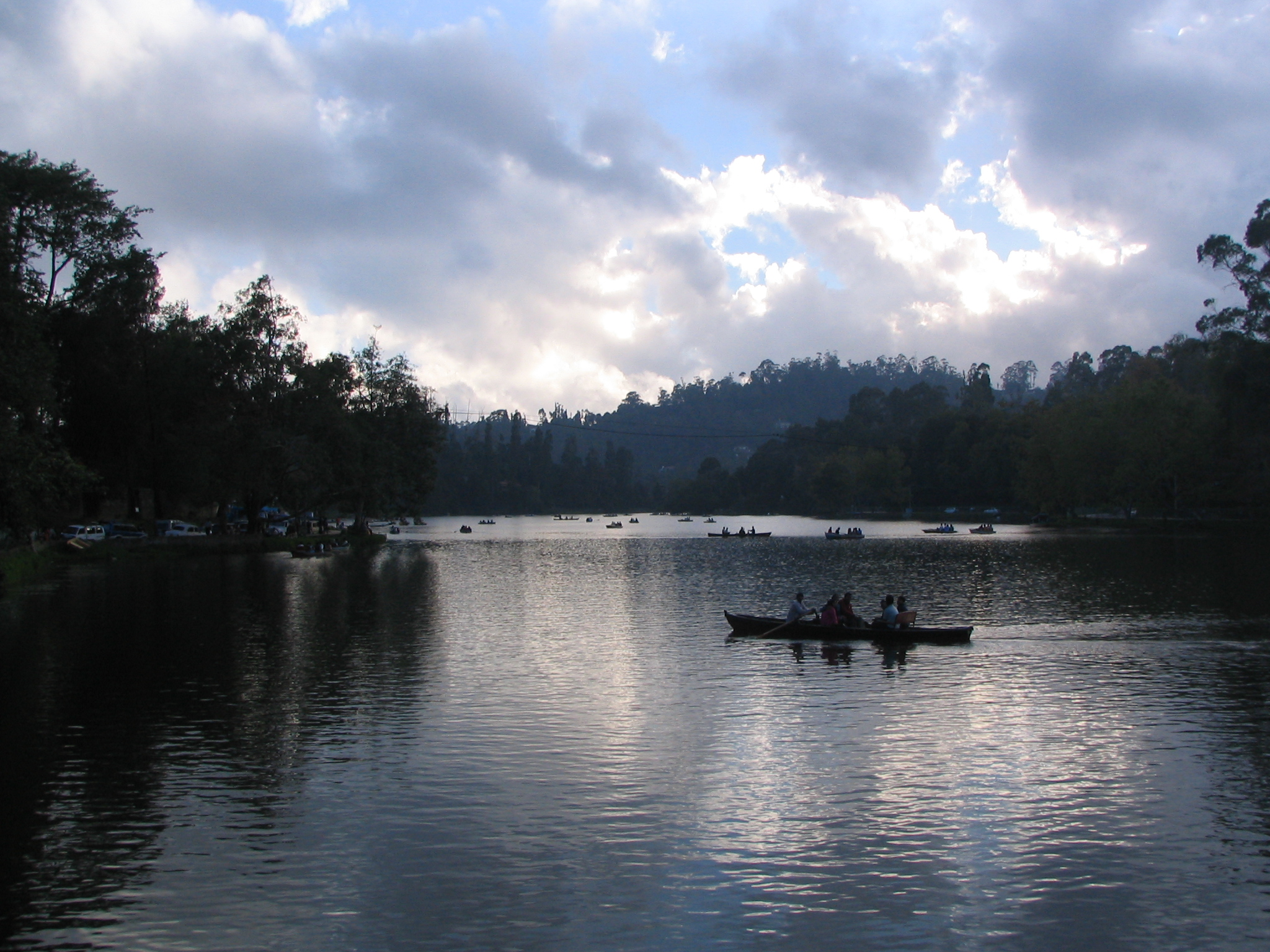
Kodaikanal Lake

=== Palani ===
Palani is a temple town located about 25 km west of Oddanchatram. It is famous for the Arulmigu Dhandayuthapani Swamy Temple, one of the six sacred abodes (Arupadaiveedu) of Murugan. The hill temple attracts millions of pilgrims annually and is one of the most important religious destinations in Tamil Nadu.

=== Pachalur ===
Pachalur is a picturesque village situated at the foothills of the Palani Hills near Oddanchatram. Surrounded by agricultural fields, small streams and hill landscapes, it serves as a gateway to several trekking routes leading towards the upper Palani Hills. The village is known for its natural beauty, rural tourism potential and panoramic views of the Western Ghats.

=== Kondrangi Hills ===
Kondrangi Hills (Kondarangi Malai) is a prominent rocky hill located near Oddanchatram in Dindigul district. Rising steeply from the surrounding plains, the hill is characterized by its distinctive conical shape, exposed granite rock faces and panoramic views of the agricultural landscape surrounding Oddanchatram. The hill is a popular destination for trekking, hiking, nature photography and adventure tourism. Its summit offers extensive views of nearby villages, farmlands and the distant ranges of the Western Ghats.
