= Dindigul district =

- District of Tamil Nadu
- Dindigul District
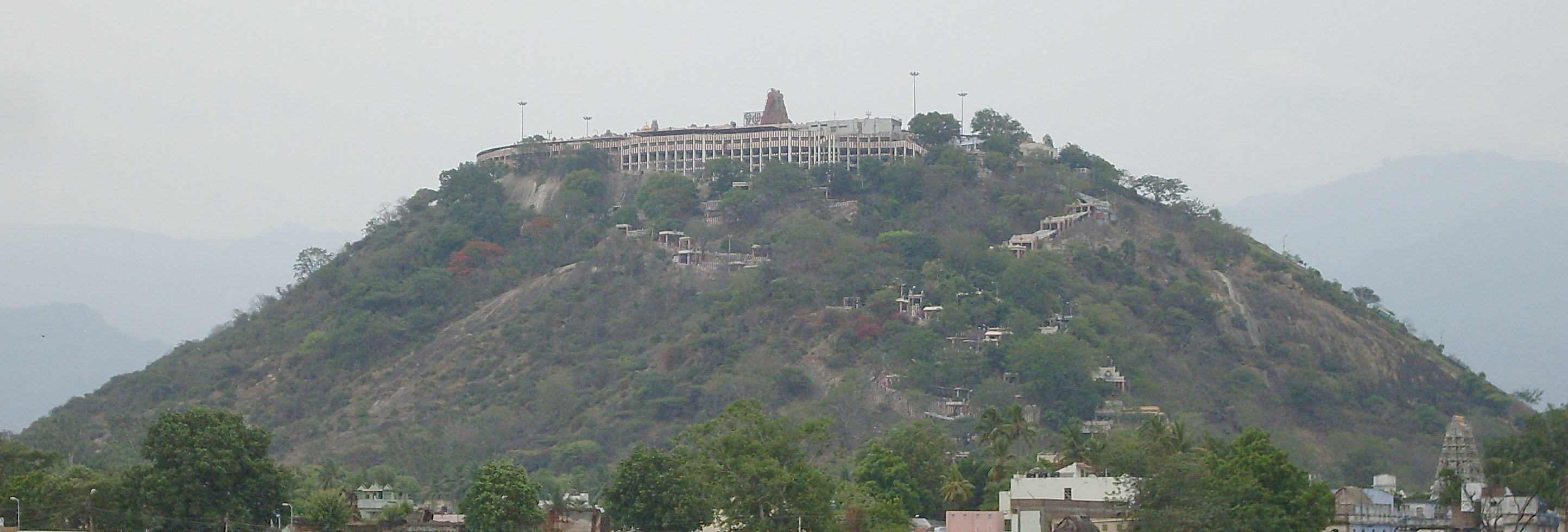
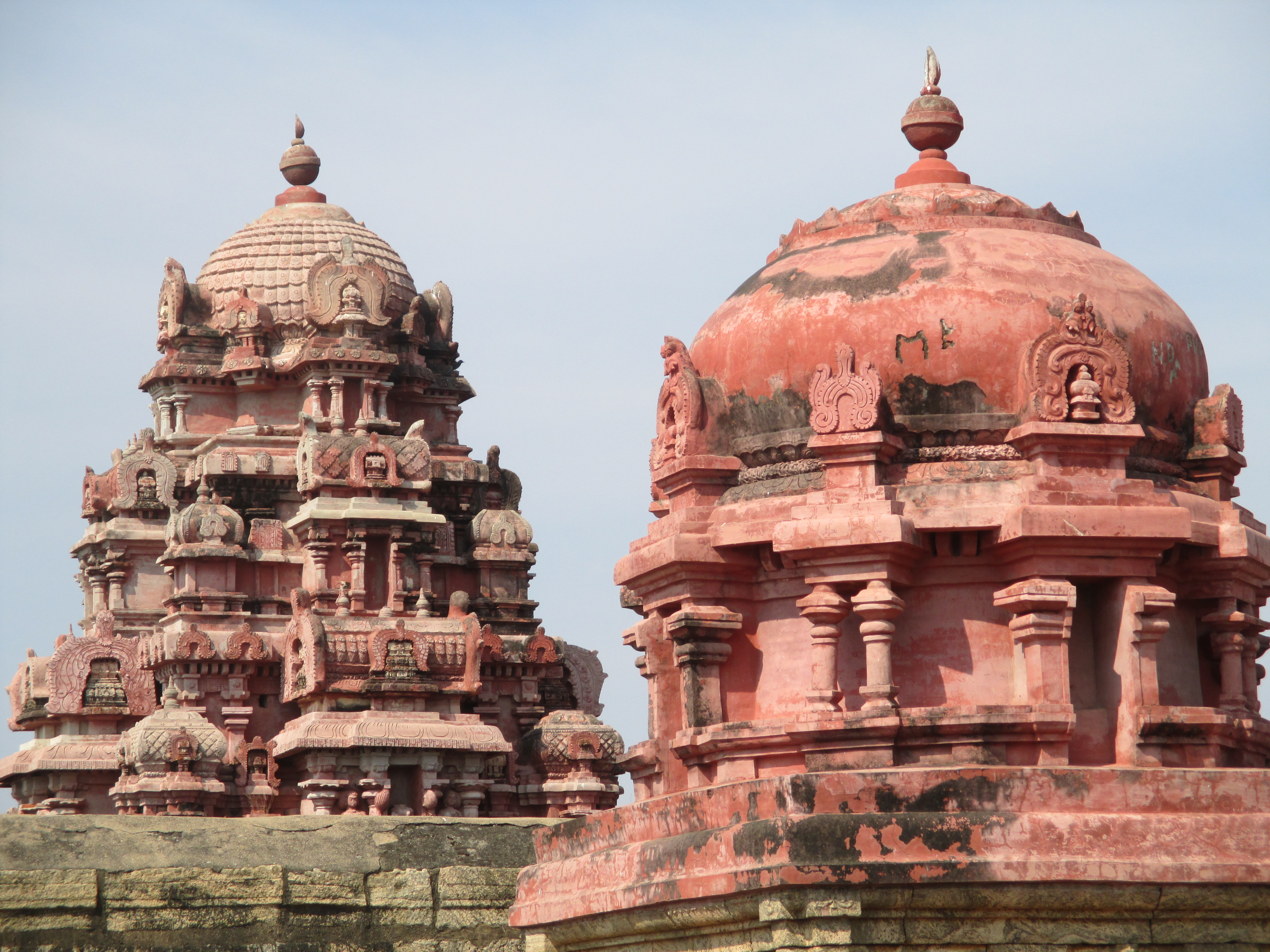
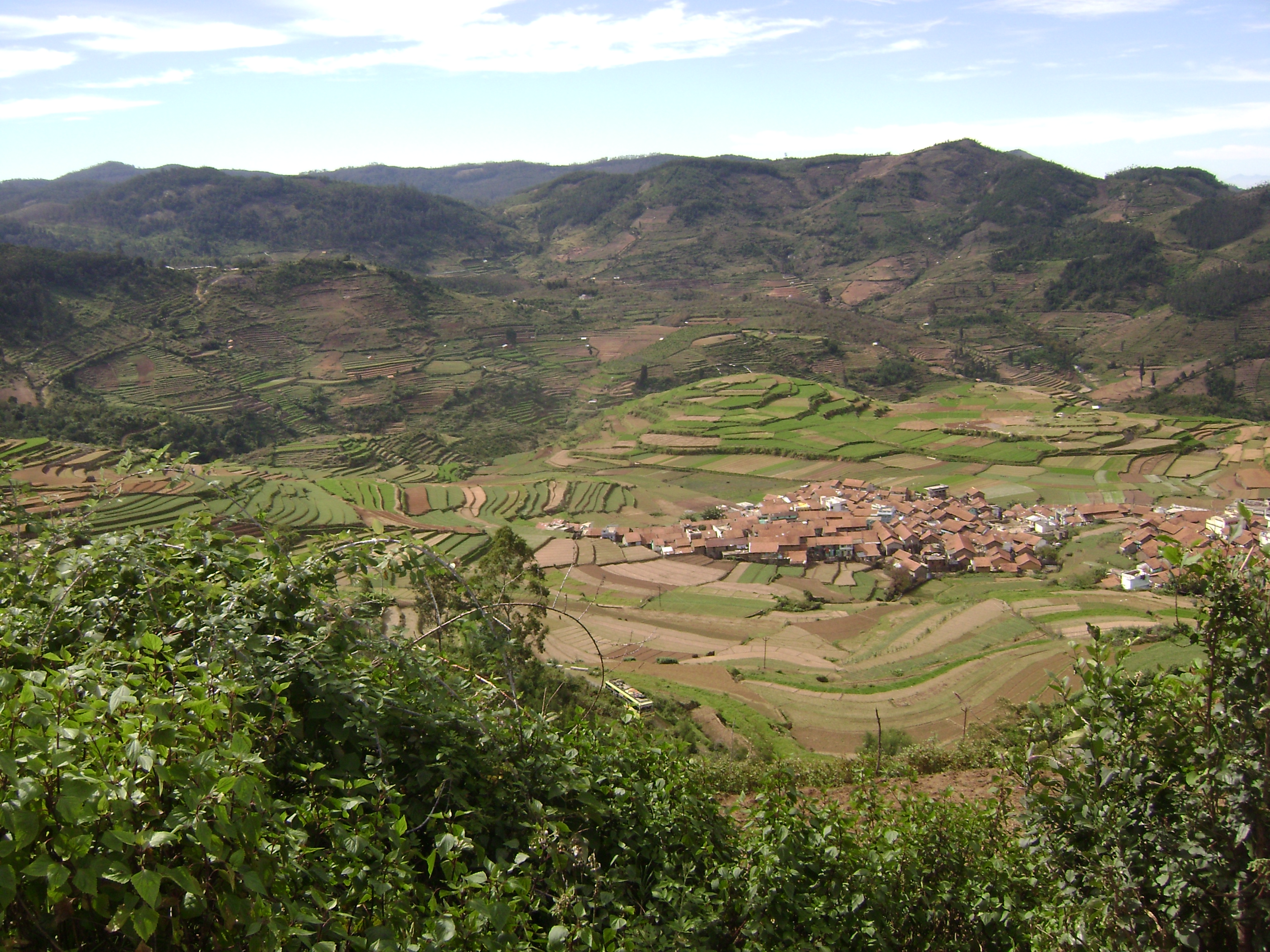
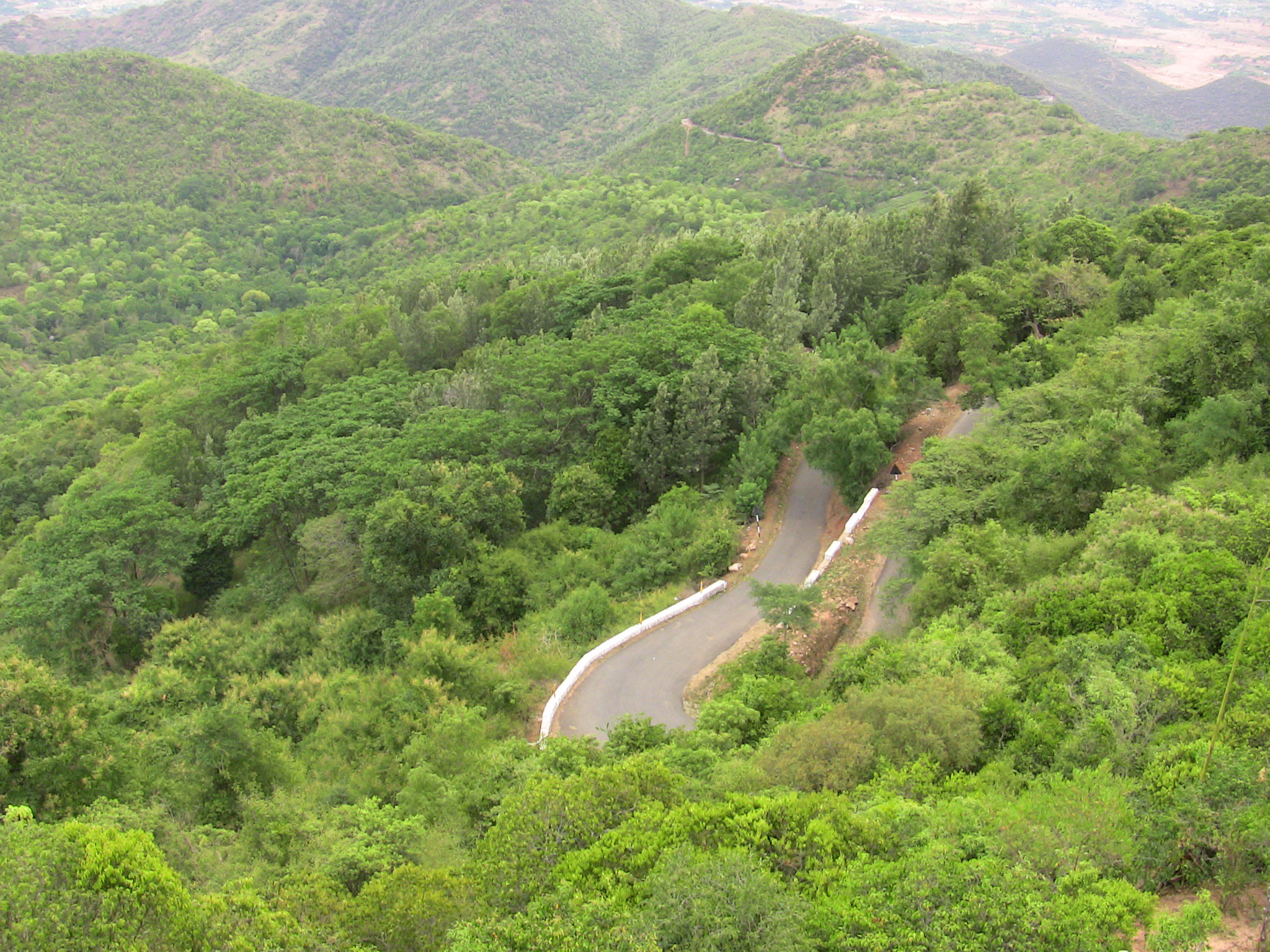
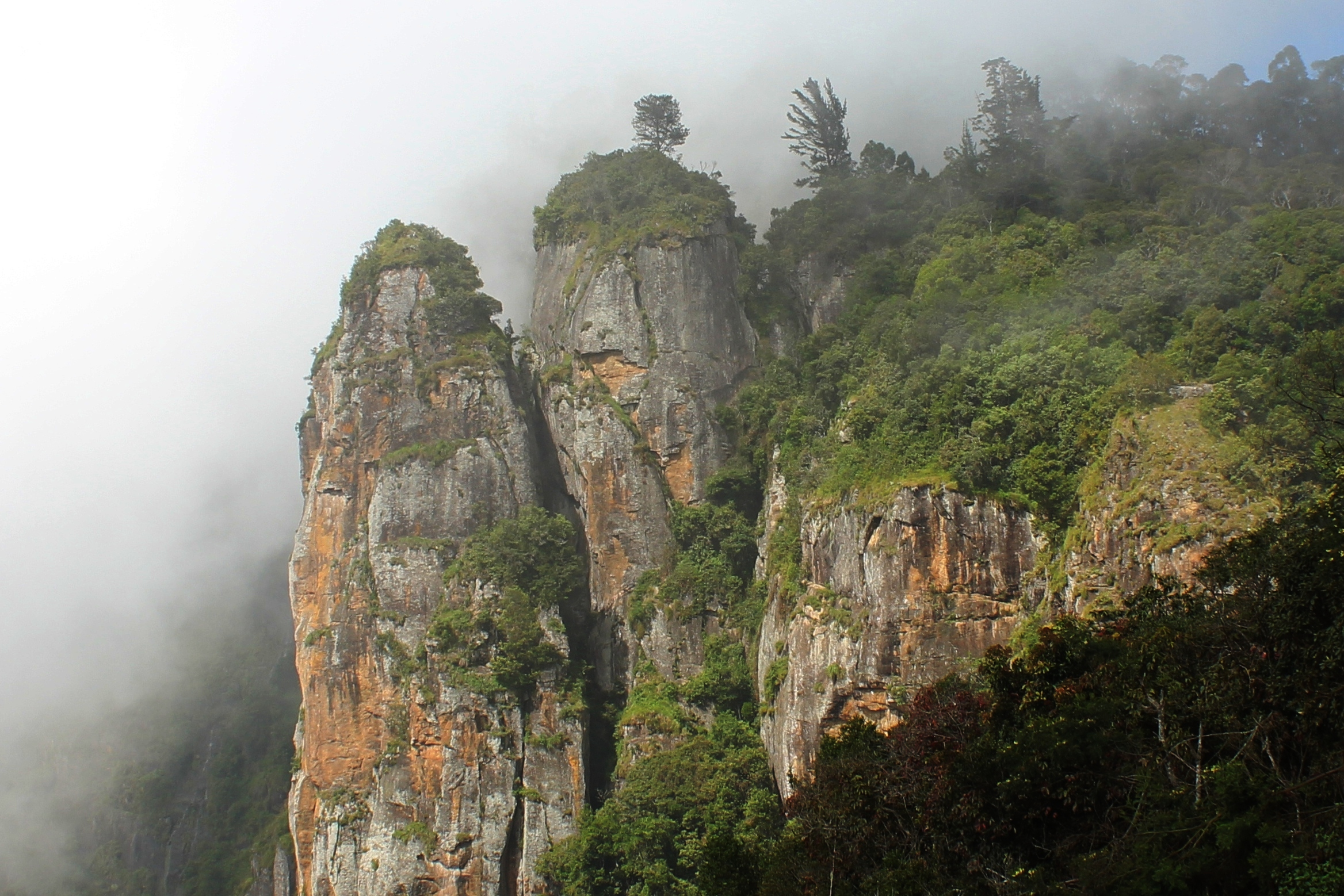
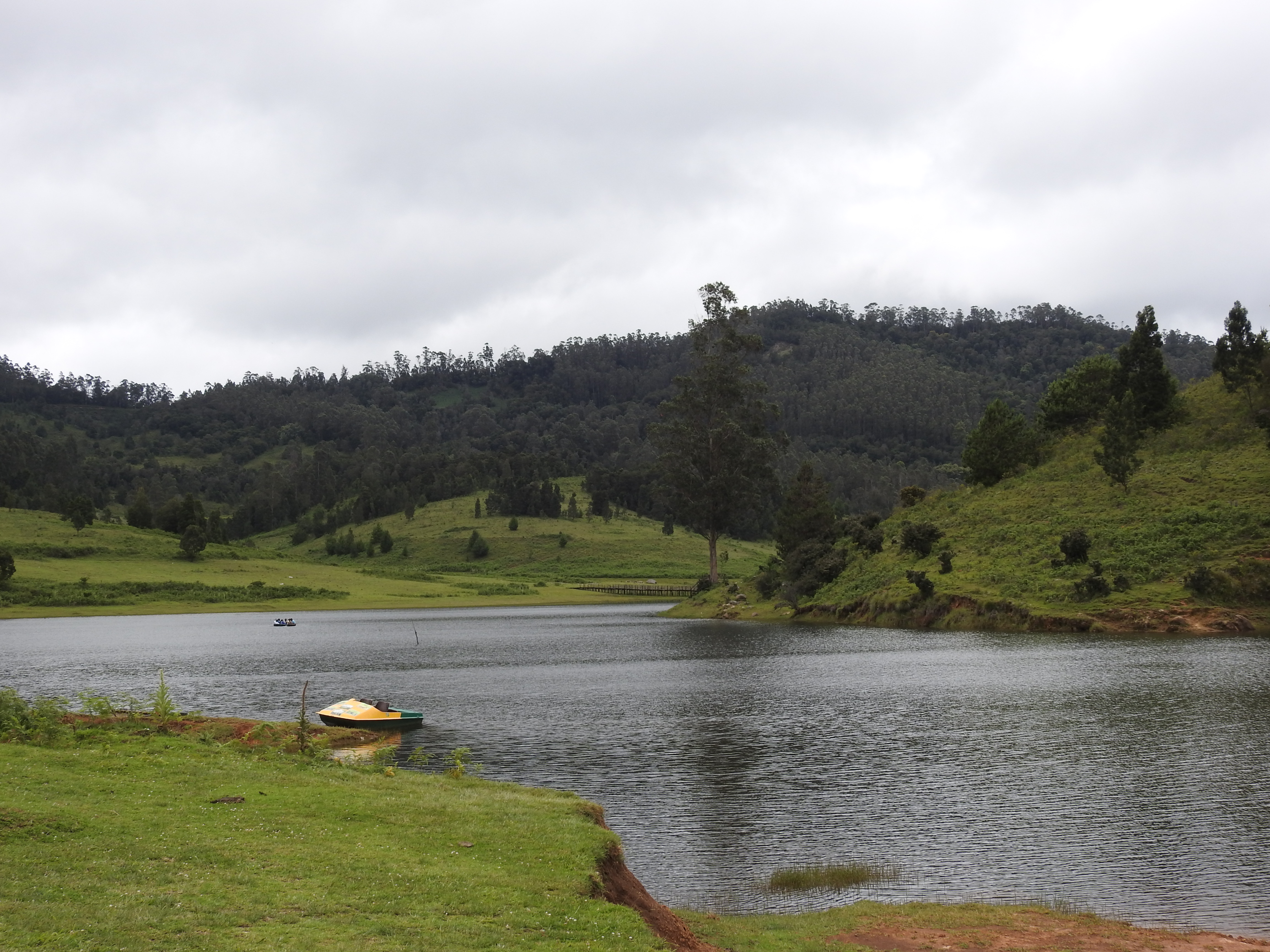
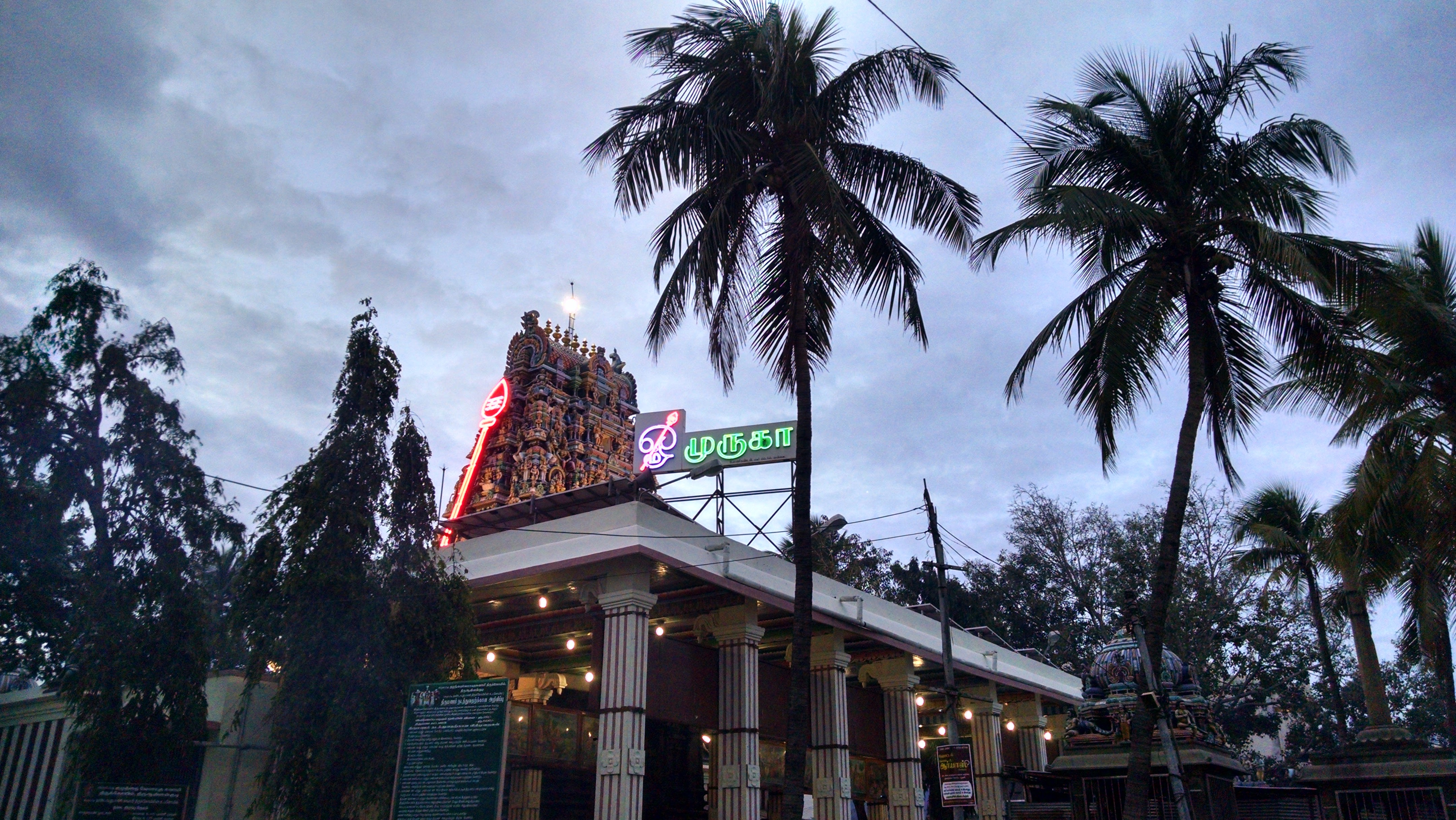
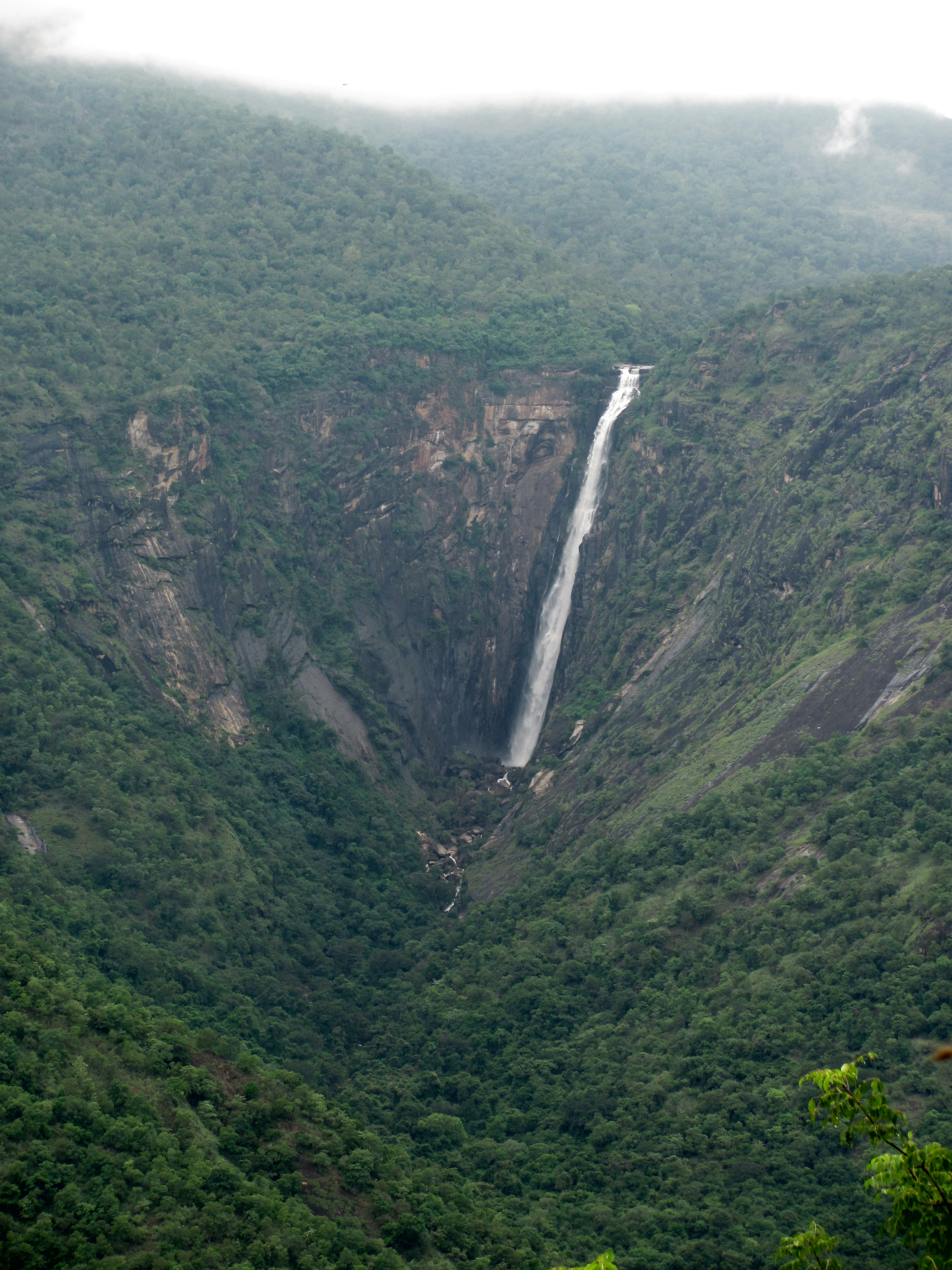
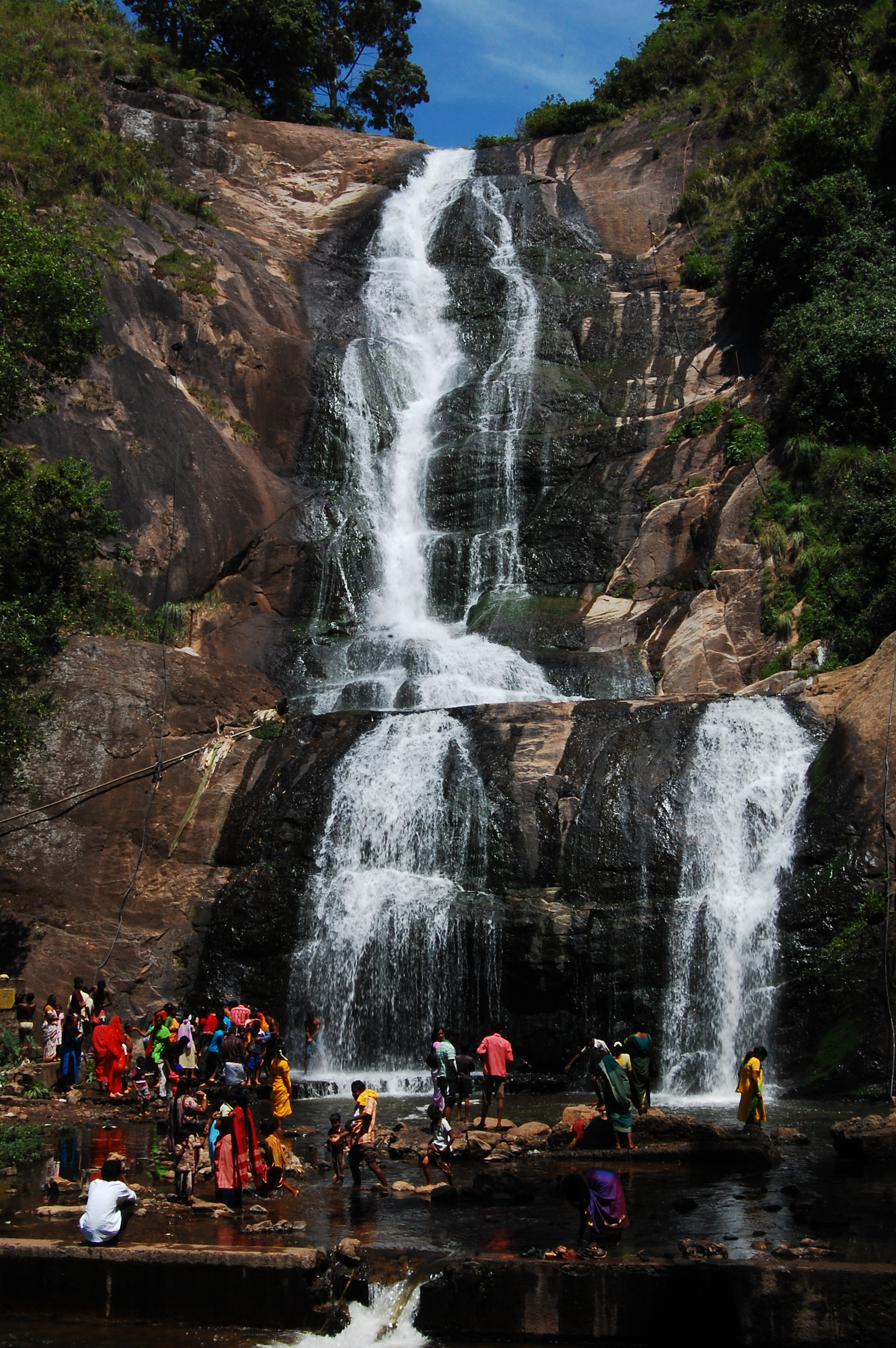
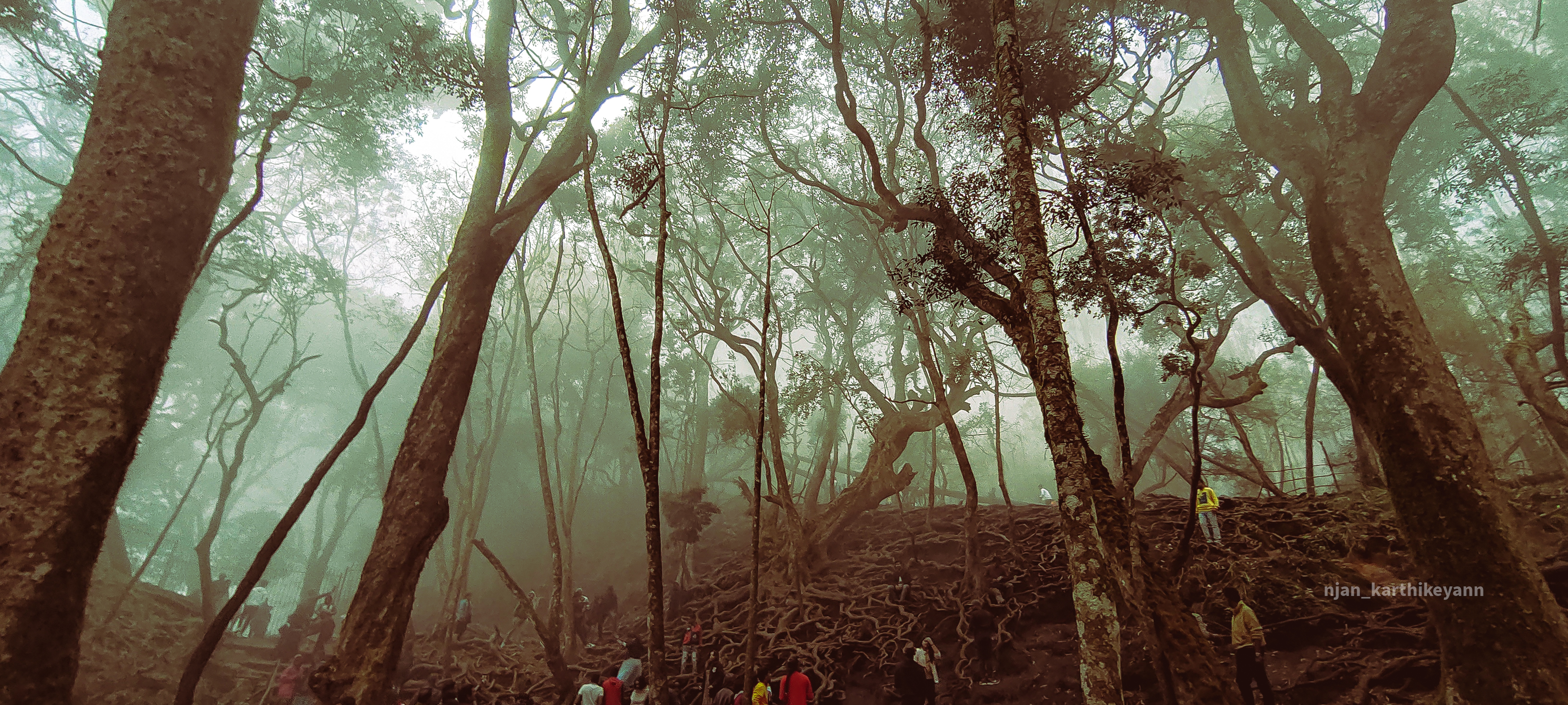
- Pazhani Murugan Temple Dindigul Fort Poombarai Village Sirumalai Ghat Road Pillar Rocks Mannavanur Lake Thiruvavinankudi Temple Thalaiyar Falls Velli Aruvi Guna Caves
- Nickname: Holland of Tamil Nadu
- Interactive map of Dindigul district
- Coordinates: 10°21′14.4″N 77°59′6″E
- Country: India
- State: Tamil Nadu
- Region: Pandya Nadu; Kongu Nadu
- Municipal City Corporation: Dindigul City Municipal Corporation
- Municipalities: Kodaikanal; Oddanchatram; Pazhani
- Established: 1742 (284 years old)
- Founder: Kingdom of Mysore (1742-1790); Government of Tamil Nadu (1985)
- Named for: Dindigul Fort
- Headquarters: Dindigul
- Taluks: Athoor, Dindigul East, Dindigul West, Gujiliamparai, Kodaikanal, Natham, Nilakkottai, Oddanchatram, Palani, Vedasandur

Government
  - District Collector: S.Saravanan, IAS
  - Superintendent of Police: Dr.A.Pradeep, IPS

Area
  - Total: 6,266.64 km^{2} (2,419.56 sq mi)
  - Rank: 1

Population (2011)
  - Total: 2,159,775
  - Rank: 13
  - Density: 344.646/km^{2} (892.630/sq mi)

Languages
  - Official: Tamil
- Time zone: UTC+5:30 (IST)
- PIN: 624xxx
- Telephone code: 0451
- ISO 3166 code: ISO 3166-2:IN
- Vehicle registration: TN-57,94
- Largest City: Dindigul
- Central location: 10°21′N 77°59′E
- Website: dindigul.nic.in

Dindigul district is one of the 38 districts in the state of Tamil Nadu in India. Dindigul District is the largest district in Tamil Nadu by area. The district headquarters is Dindigul.

The District was founded on 1742 comprising 18 Palayams as Dindigul Seemai under the order of Mysore Kingdom. After that Madurai was made headquarters of the British army and Dindigul was attached to it as a taluk. Then the district was re-established from Madurai District in 1985. It has an area of 6266.64 km^{2} and comprises 3 revenue divisions, 10 taluks, and 14 panchayat unions.

== History ==
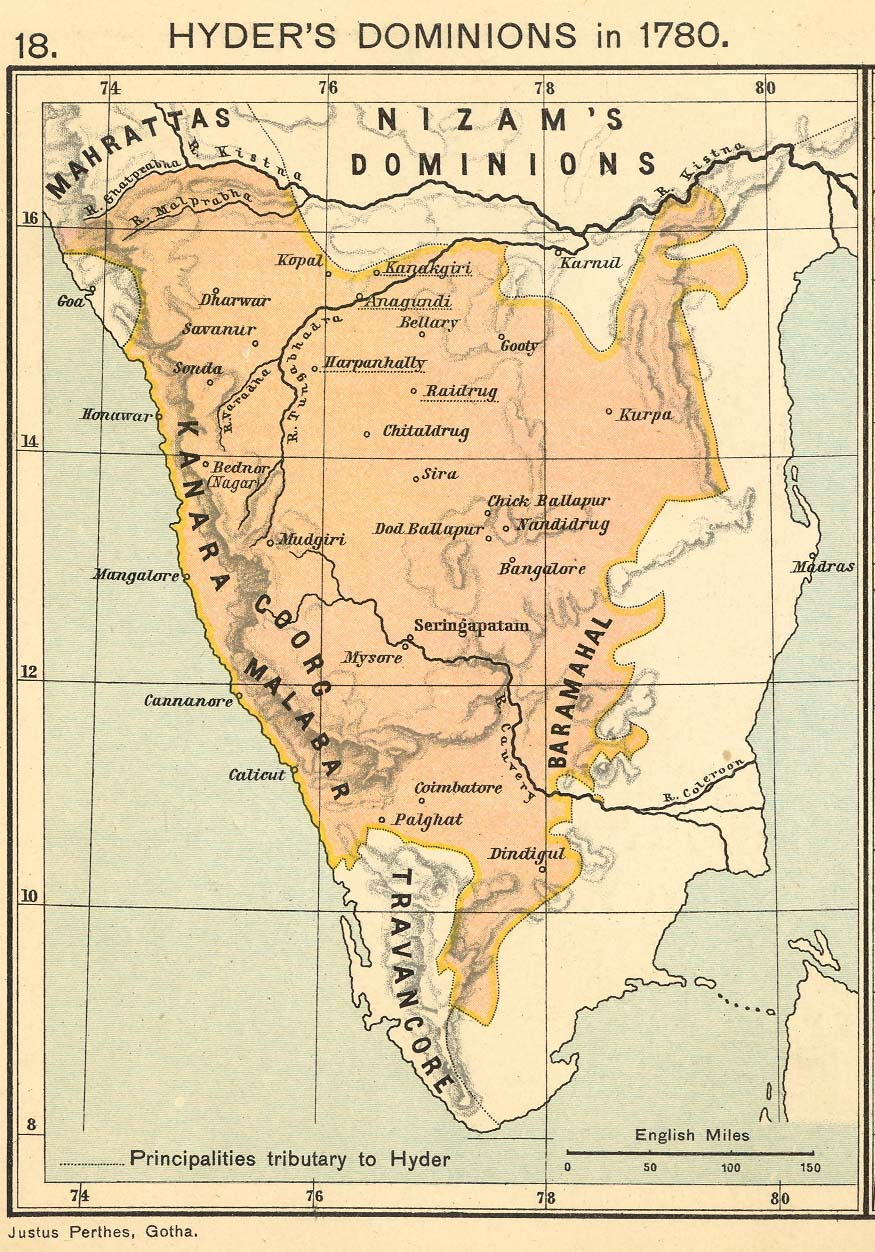
Dindigul in Kingdom Of Mysore in the year 1780.

In 1742, the Mysore army under the leadership of Venkatarayar conquered Dindigul from Madurai Nayaks. He governed Dindigul as a representative of Maharaja of Mysore. There were 18 palayams (a small region consists of few villages) during his reign and all these palayams were comprised and formed Dindigul Seemai (District), with Dindigul as the capital. These palayams wanted to be independent and refused to pay taxes to Venkatarayar. In 1748, Venkatappa was made governor of the region in place of Venkatarayar, who also failed. In 1755, the Maharaja sent Haider Ali to Dindigul to handle the situation.

In 1783 the British Army, led by Captain Long, occupied Dindigul. In 1784, after an agreement between Mysore and the British army, Dindigul was restored by Mysore province. In 1788, Tipu Sultan, the Son of Haider Ali, was crowned as "King of Dindigul". In 1790, James Stewart of the British army conquered Dindigul again during third war of Mysore. In a pact made on 1792, Tipu ceded Dindigul to the British.

In 1798, the British army strengthened the hill fort with cannons and built sentinel rooms in every corner. The British army, under Statten stayed at Dindigul fort from 1798 to 1859. After that Madurai was made headquarters of the British army and Dindigul was attached to it as a taluk. Dindigul was under the rule of the British until India gained Independence on 15 August 1947.

After 126 years, Dindigul District was Re-established from Madurai District on September 1985. it was named as Mannar Thirumalai District, Quaid-e-Milleth District and Dindigul Anna District. Then, it is Renamed as "Dindigul District"

== Economy ==
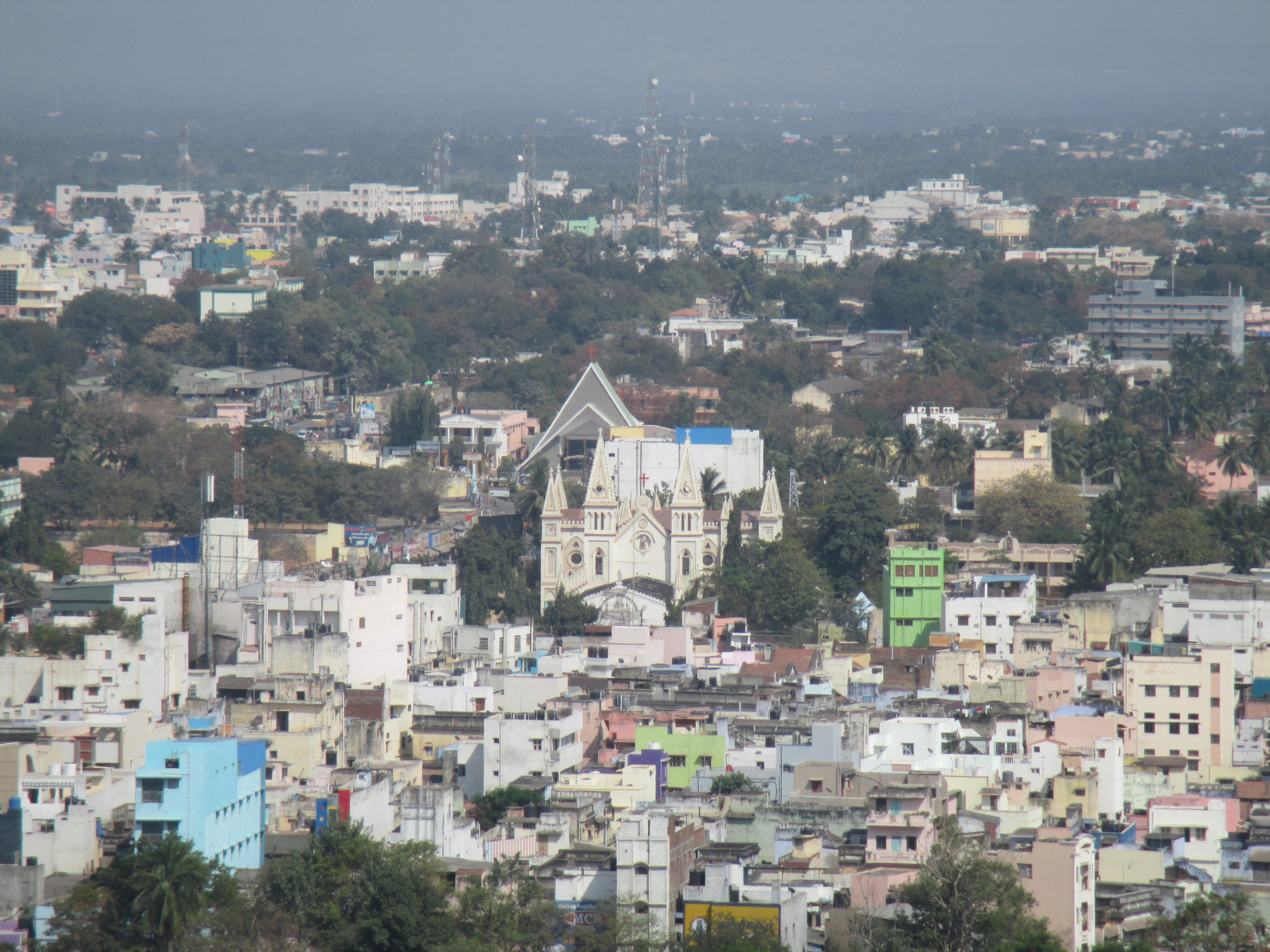
View of the city centre from Dindigul fort

According to Indian Census of 2001, Dindigul City's urban workforce participation rate is 35.24 percent. Dindigul, being the headquarters of the district, has registered growth in the secondary and tertiary sectors, with a corresponding decrease in the primary Sector. Major employment in the city is provided by industrial estates, hand loom, trading and commerce activities. Approximately 90 percent of the workforce is employed in the tertiary sector. The district at large has only two industrial estates, with one of them located in the city. Oddanchatram is one of the important towns in Dindigul district. Oddanchatram Vegetable Market (also known as Gandhi market) is the largest vegetable market in Tamil Nadu. As of 2001, there were approximately 60 tanneries, 165 lock manufacturing units and large number of cotton spinning mills.

Locks and steel safes are manufactured in Dindigul and operated as a co-operative sector. Locks manufactured in Dindigul are sold in national and international markets and it is well known all over India for the quality of locks. Dindigul locks received geographical indication on 30 August 2019. A decline in lock industry is observed in modern times and other industries like leather, handloom, and aggro opportunities have gained significance. Silk, muslin and blanket manufacturing is common in Dindigul and after Coimbatore, the city has the second largest textile spindling capacity in the State. Chinnalapatti silk, a brand of silk saree is produced out of Chinnalapatti located 11 km (6.8 mi) from the city. The climate condition of the region is conducive for horticulture and agriculture. The district at large produce non-food crops like coffee, flowers, tobacco, and eucalyptus. Dindigul is the center for wholesale trading of fruits like orange, pineapple, sapota and guava, and vegetables like onion.

Dindigul was an important center of trade in tobacco and manufacture of cigars during the British times. A favorite cigar of Winston Churchill called Churut, the 'Light of Asia', was produced in Dindigul. The tobacco industry is one of the main sources of employment for the inhabitants of Dindigul. The central government has a research center for tobacco in Vedasandur. This is one of the two centers in India, the other one is Rajamundri. In modern times, it has the largest trading center in the state for chewing tobacco and scented betel nuts. Well-known brands of scented chewing tobacco like Angu Vilas, Roja Supari etc. operate out of the city and sent to various places in the state and outside. Dindigul is also one of the leading leather producers and suppliers in the state. In 2006, the Ministry of Panchayati Raj named Dindigul one of the country's 250 most backward districts (out of a total of 640). It is one of the six districts in Tamil Nadu currently receiving funds from Backward Regions Grant Fund Programme (BRGF). The district is struck between the south west and north chaos as it lies in the South West Region of Tamil Nadu. Its relative closeness to the Cities of Trichy, Coimbatore and Madurai makes this district as a Transport nexus of this region.

== Geography and Climate ==
=== Geography ===
The district is located in the Southwest part of Tamil Nadu.

The district features a highly diverse topography that transitions rapidly from flat, plain terrain to massive mountain ecosystems. The western and southern portions are dominated by the Palani Hills (part of the Western Ghats) and the Sirumalai Hills (last hills of Eastern Ghats), which act as critical water catchment areas.

The interior is split between two major river sub-basins. The northern and western parts of the district, particularly around the Palani Hills, form a vital catchment area for the Kaveri river basin. The major streams and rivers draining this region include the Shanmuganadhi, Nangangiar, Kodaganar, Kuthiraiyar, and Varadhamanathi. These rivers generally flow north and northeastward to feed the Amaravathi, a major tributary of the Kaveri. Several reservoirs, such as the Palar-Porandalar, Kuthiraiyar, and Varadhamanathi dams, are constructed across these streams to regulate water for local agricultural irrigation.

The southern and southeastern tracts of the district drain into the Vaigai river basin. The Vaigai River itself flows into the southern part of the district, supported by key tributaries like the Manjalar and Marudhanadhi which originate in the local hill ranges. These rivers flow southward to support extensive paddy cultivation in the plains. The Manjalar and Marudhanathi dams serve as primary water storage and flood control structures for this part of the district.

The district is bounded by Madurai district in the south, Theni district in the Southwest, Idukki district of Kerala to the west, Tiruppur district in the northwest, Karur district in the north and Tiruchirappalli district in the northeast.

=== Climate ===
Dindigul

Climate chart (precipitation, max. and min. temperature)
| J | F | M | A | M | J | J | A | S | O | N | D |
| 25 26 13 | 26 30 16 | 37 35 21 | 74 38 24 | 125 38 25 | 145 35 26 | 140 32 26 | 154 32 25 | 187 32 25 | 259 32 22 | 214 29 17 | 94 26 13 |
- █ Average max. and min. temperatures in °C
- █ Precipitation totals in mm
Imperial conversion
| J | F | M | A | M | J | J | A | S | O | N | D |
| 1 79 55 | 1 87 61 | 1.5 96 69 | 2.9 100 75 | 4.9 100 78 | 5.7 95 78 | 5.5 90 78 | 6.1 90 78 | 7.4 90 77 | 10 89 72 | 8.4 84 63 | 3.7 80 55 |
- █ Average max. and min. temperatures in °F
- █ Precipitation totals in inches

== Revenue Divisions and Taluks ==
Dindigul Revenue Division :

1. Athoor
2. Dindigul East
3. Dindigul West
4. Natham
5. Nilakkottai

Palani Revenue Division :

1. Gujiliamparai
2. Oddanchatram
3. Palani
4. Vedasandur

Kodaikanal Revenue Division :

1. Kodaikanal

=== Municipal Corporation ===
1. Dindigul City Municipal Corporation

=== Municipalities ===
1. Kodaikanal
2. Oddanchatram
3. Pazhani

=== Town Panchayats ===
1. Agaram
2. Ammayanaickanur
3. Ayakudi
4. Ayyalur
5. Ayyampalayam
6. Balasamudram
7. Chinnalapatti
8. Eriodu
9. Kannivadi
10. Keeranur
11. Natham
12. Neikkarapatti
13. Nilakkottai
14. Palayam
15. Pannaikadu
16. Pattiveeranpatti
17. Sevugampatti
18. Sithayankottai
19. Sriramapuram
20. Thadikombu
21. Vadamadurai
22. Vattalagundu
23. Vedasandur

== Demographics ==
Historical population
| Year | Pop. | ±% p.a. |
|---|---|---|
| 1901 | 714,098 | — |
| 1911 | 780,440 | +0.89% |
| 1921 | 813,581 | +0.42% |
| 1931 | 859,809 | +0.55% |
| 1941 | 974,794 | +1.26% |
| 1951 | 1,083,964 | +1.07% |
| 1961 | 1,178,363 | +0.84% |
| 1971 | 1,398,023 | +1.72% |
| 1981 | 1,564,448 | +1.13% |
| 1991 | 1,760,601 | +1.19% |
| 2001 | 1,923,014 | +0.89% |
| 2011 | 2,159,775 | +1.17% |

Religions in Dindigul district (2011)
| Religion | Percent |
| Hinduism | 87.02% |
| Christianity | 7.87% |
| Islam | 4.86% |
| Other or not stated | 0.25% |

According to the 2011 census, Dindigul district had a population of 2,159,775 with a sex-ratio of 998 females for every 1,000 males, much above the national average of 929. 37.41% of the population lived in urban areas. A total of 216,576 were under the age of six, constituting 111,955 males and 104,621 females. Scheduled Castes and Scheduled Tribes accounted for 20.95% and 0.37% of the population, respectively. The average literacy of the district was 68.61%, compared to the national average of 72.99%. The district had a total of 560,773 households. There were a total of 1,105,155 workers, comprising 155,332 cultivators, 388,725 main agricultural labourers, 25,253 in house hold industries, 393,707 other workers, 142,138 marginal workers, 10,073 marginal cultivators, 79,234 marginal agricultural labourers, 5,576 marginal workers in household industries and 47,255 other marginal workers.

Languages of Dindigul district (2011)
1. Tamil (91.5%)
2. Telugu (5.45%)
3. Kannada (1.69%)
4. Others (1.34%)

At the time of the 2011 census, 91.52% of the population spoke Tamil, 5.45% Telugu and 1.69% Kannada as their first language.

== Politics ==
| District | No. | Constituency | Name | Party | Alliance | Remarks |
|---|---|---|---|---|---|---|
| Dindigul | 127 | Palani | K. Ravimanoharan | AIADMK | NDA | Supported TVK; Later declared support for EPS |
| Dindigul | 128 | Oddanchatram | R. Sakkarapani | DMK | SPA | |
| Dindigul | 129 | Athoor | I. Periyasamy | DMK | SPA | |
| Dindigul | 130 | Nilakkottai (SC) | R. Ayyanar | TVK | TVK+ | |
| Dindigul | 131 | Natham | Natham R. Viswanathan | AIADMK | NDA | Supported TVK; Later declared support for EPS |
| Dindigul | 132 | Dindigul | I. P. Senthilkumar | DMK | SPA | |
| Dindigul | 133 | Vedasandur | T. Saminathan | DMK | SPA | |

== Places of interest ==
- Asankodai, small village
- Athoor Dam
- Berijam Lake
- Dindigul RockFort
- Kalthurai
- Kodaikanal
- Mandavadi
- Mannavanur
- Narikkalpatti, agriculture, weaving
- Odaipatty
- Palani - Murugan Temple
- Pandrimalai
- Parumarathupatti
- Sirumalai
- Thirumalaigoundenvalasu
- Veerachinnampatty
- Velampatty
- Vembarpatti
- Viruveedu

== See also ==
- List of districts of Tamil Nadu
