= List of districts of Tamil Nadu =

Districts of Tamil Nadu
- Districts of Tamil Nadu
- Location: Tamil Nadu
- Number: 38
- Populations: 565,223 (Perambalur) – 6,748,026 (Chennai)
- Areas: 462.3 km2 (Chennai) – 6,289.1 km2 (Dindigul)
- Government: Government of Tamil Nadu
- Subdivisions: Revenue divisions

The Indian state of Tamil Nadu is divided into 38 districts. Districts are the major administrative divisions of a state and are further sub-divided into revenue divisions and taluks.

During the British Raj, 12 districts of the erstwhile Madras Presidency had their boundaries within the present-day Tamil Nadu. Post the Indian Independence in 1947 and the political integration, the Madras Province inherited majority of the erstwhile Madras Presidency. Following the adoption of the Constitution of India in 1950, the Madras State was formed, which was further reorganized in 1953 and 1956. After the reorganization of Indian states in 1956, the state had 13 re-organized districts, which were further divided over the years.

Between 1960 and 1980, three additional districts were formed. In the late eighties, five more districts were bifurcated from existing districts, and ten more districts were formed in the nineties, taking the total count to 30. Three new districts were bifurcated in the 2000s. In 2019–20, five more districts were formed for a total of 38 districts.

== History ==
=== Before 1947 ===
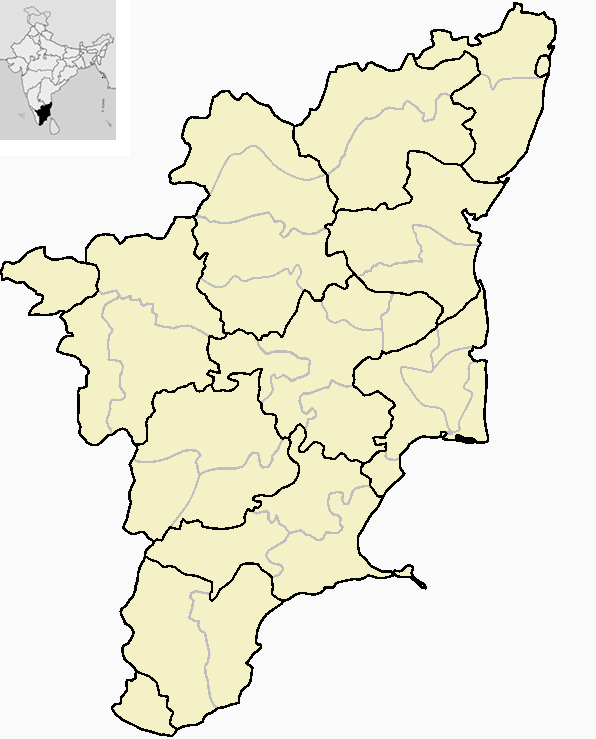
Districts of Madras in 1956 with 2009 boundaries in gray

During the British Raj, the Madras Presidency was made up of 26 districts, 12 of which were part of the boundaries of the present-day Tamil Nadu, namely, Chingleput, Coimbatore, Nilgiris, North Arcot, Madras, Madura, Ramnad, Salem, South Arcot, Tanjore, Tinnevely, and Trichinopoly.

=== 1947–56 ===
After the Indian Independence on 15 August 1947, the Madras Presidency became the Madras Province of the Dominion of India. The princely state of Pudukottai acceded to the Indian Union on 4 March 1948 and was made as a part of the Trichinopoly district. When the new Constitution of India came into force on 26 January 1950, the Madras Province became the Madras State of the Republic of India. The Madras State included most of the present-day Tamil Nadu, Coastal Andhra and Rayalaseema regions of the present-day Andhra Pradesh, the Malabar region of the present-day Kerala, Bellary and South Canara districts of the present-day Karnataka. The Coastal Andhra and Rayalaseema regions were separated to form the new Andhra State in 1953.

As a result of the re-organization of states in 1956, South Canara and Bellary districts were merged with Mysore State, which became Karnataka and the Malabar district was added to the State of Travancore-Cochin to form Kerala. The Tamil speaking regions of Kanyakumari, which were earlier part of Travancore-Cochin, were merged to the Madras State. After the reorganisation, the Madras state had 13 districts namely: Chingleput, Coimbatore, Kanyakumari, Madras, Madurai, Nilgiris, North Arcot, Ramanathapuram, Salem, South Arcot, Thanjavur, Tiruchirappalli and Tirunelveli.

=== 1957–89 ===
Animation showing the division of districts in Tamil Nadu from 1956 to 2009.

- On 2 October 1965, Dharmapuri district was bifurcated from the erstwhile Salem district comprising Dharmapuri, Harur, Hosur, and Krishnagiri taluks.
- In 1969, the Madras State was renamed as Tamil Nadu.
- On 14 January 1974, Pudukkottai district was formed from the parts of Tiruchirappalli and Thanjavur districts comprising Kulathur, Thirumayam, Alangudi, and Aranthangi taluks.
- On 31 August 1979, Erode district was bifurcated from the erstwhile Coimbatore district comprising Gobichettipalayam, and Erode taluks.
- On 8 March 1985, Sivaganga and Virudhunagar districts were formed from the erstwhile Ramanathapuram district. Sivaganga comprised Tirupattur, Karaikudi, Devakottai, Sivaganga, Manamadurai, and Ilayangudi taluks and Virudhunagar comprised Srivilliputhur, Virudhunagar, Tiruchuli, Aruppukottai, Sattur, and Rajapalayam taluks.
- On 15 September 1985, Dindigul district was bifurcated from the erstwhile Madurai district comprising Dindigul, Palani, and Kodaikanal taluks.
- On 20 October 1986, Thoothukudi district was split from the erstwhile Tirunelveli district comprising Thoothukudi, Ottapidaram, and Tiruvaikuntam taluks.
- On 30 September 1989, Tiruvannamalai and Vellore districts were formed from the erstwhile North Arcot district. Tiruvannamalai district comprised Tiruvannamalai, Arni, Vandavasi, Cheyyar, Polur, and Chengam taluks Vellore district comprised Arakkonam, Arcot, Gudiyatham, Tirupattur, Vellore, Vaniyambadi, and Walajapet taluks.

=== 1990–99 ===
The 32 districts of the state in 2011.

- On 18 October 1991, Nagapattinam was bifurcated from the erstwhile Thanjavur district comprising Tiruvarur, Mayiladuthurai, Manargudi, Needamangalam, Nagapattinam taluks, and Valangaiman from Kumbakonam taluk.
- On 30 September 1993, Cuddalore and Viluppuram districts were formed from the erstwhile South Arcot district. Cuddalore district comprised Cuddalore, Chidambaram, and Vriddachalam taluks and Villupuram district comprised Kallakuruchi, Villupuram, Tirukkoyilur, and Tindivanam taluks.
- On 30 September 1995, Karur and Perambalur districts were split from the erstwhile Tiruchirappalli district with Karur district comprising Karur, Kulithalai, and Manapparai taluks and Perambalur district comprising Perambalur, and Kunnam taluks.
- On 25 July 1996, Theni district was bifurcated from the erstwhile Madurai district comprising Theni, Bodinayakanur, Periyakulam, Uthamapalayam and Andipatti taluks.
- On 1 January 1997, Tiruvarur district was formed from the parts of erstwhile Nagapattinam and Thanjavur districts comprising Tiruvarur, Nannilam, Kudavasal, Needamangalam, Mannargudi, Thiruthiraipoondi taluks from Nagappatinam district and Valangaiman taluk from Thanjavur district.
- On 1 January 1997, Namakkal district was bifurcated from the erstwhile Salem district comprising Namakkal, Tiruchengode, Rasipuram, and Paramathi-Velur taluks.
- On 1 July 1997, Kanchipuram and Tiruvallur districts were split from the erstwhile Chengalpattu and Chennai districts with Kanchipuram district comprising Kanchipuram, Sriperumbudur, Uthiramerur, Chengalpattu, Tambaram, Tirukalukundram, Maduranthakam, and Cheyyur taluks and Tiruvallur district comprising Tiruvallur, Tiruttani, Ponneri, and Gummidipoondi taluks.

=== 2000–present ===
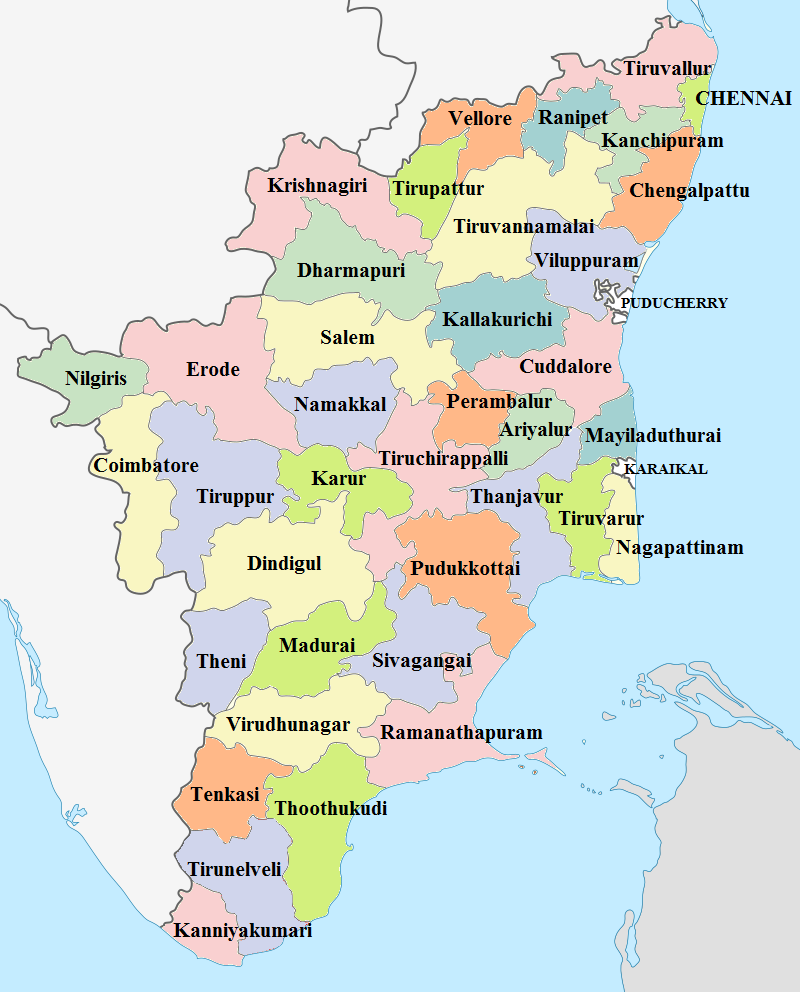
Map showing the 38 districts of Tamil Nadu

- On 9 February 2004, Krishnagiri district was bifurcated from the erstwhile Dharmapuri district comprising Krishnagiri, Hosur, Pochampalli, Uthangarai, and Denkanikottai taluks.
- On 19 November 2007, Ariyalur district was bifurcated from the erstwhile Perambalur district comprising Ariyalur, Udayarpalayam, and Sendurai taluks.
- On 24 October 2009, Tiruppur district was formed from the parts of Coimbatore and Erode districts comprising Tiruppur, Udumalpet taluks, parts of Palladam and Avinashi taluks of Coimbatore district, and Dharapuram, Kangeyam taluks and parts of Perundurai taluk of Erode district.
- On 5 January 2018, the Chennai district was expanded by the addition of Madhavaram, Maduravoyal, Ambattur, Tiruvottriyur taluks, and parts of Ponneri taluk of Tiruvallur district along with Alandur, and Sholinganallur taluks of Kanchipuram district.
- On 22 November 2019, Tenkasi district was bifurcated from the erstwhile Tirunelveli district comprising Tenkasi, Sengottai, Kadayanallur, Sivagiri, Veerakeralampudur, Sankarankovil, Thiruvenkatam, and Alangulam taluks.
- On 26 November 2019, Kallakurichi district was bifurcated from the erstwhile Viluppuram district comprising Kallakurichi, Sankarapuram, Chinnasalem, Ulundurpet, Thirukovilur and Kalvarayanmalai taluks.
- On 29 November 2019, Tirupattur and Ranipet districts were split from the erstwhile Vellore district with Tirupattur district comprising Tirupattur, Vaniyambadi, Natrampalli, and Ambur taluks and Ranipet district comprising Walajah, Arcot, Nemili, and Arakkonam taluks.
- On 30 November 2019, Chengalpattu district was bifurcated from the erstwhile Kanchipuram district comprising Tirukalukundram, Chengalpattu, Madurantakam, Cheyyar, Tiruporur, Tambaram, Pallavaram, and Vandalur taluks.
- On 24 March 2020, Mayiladuthurai district was formed from the erstwhile Nagapattinam district comprising Mayiladuthurai, Sirkazhi, Tharangambadi, and Kuthalam taluks.

== List of districts ==
=== Active districts ===
District	Code	Headquarters	Estd.	Predecessor	Area (km^{2})	Population	Pop. density (/km^{2})	Divisions	Taluks	Assembly constituencies	Lok Sabha constituencies	Map
Ariyalur	ARI	Ariyalur	23 November 2007	Perambalur	2,027.6	754,894	372	Ariyalur; Udayarpalayam	Andimadam; Ariyalur; Sendurai; Udayarpalayam	Ariyalur; Jayankondam	Chidambaram	
Chengalpattu	CHG	Chengalpattu	29 November 2019	Kanchipuram	2,802.6	2,556,244	912	Chengalpattu; Madurantakam; Tambaram	Chengalpattu; Cheyyur; Madurantakam; Pallavaram; Tambaram; Thiruporur; Thirukazhukundram; Vandalur	Cheyyur; Chengalpattu; Maduranthakam; Pallavaram; Tambaram; Thiruporur	Kancheepuram; Sriperumbudur	
Chennai (formerly Madras)	CHN	Chennai	1 November 1956	None	462.3	6,748,026	10,052	Chennai Central; Chennai North; Chennai South	Alandur; Ambattur; Aminjikarai; Ayanavaram; Egmore; Guindy; Kolathur; Madhavaram; Maduravoyal; Mambalam; Thirumayilai; Perambur; Purasawalkam; Sholinganallur; Tiruvottiyur; Tondiarpet; Velachery	Alandur; Ambattur; Anna Nagar; Chepauk-Thiruvallikeni; Dr. Radhakrishnan Nagar; Egmore; Harbour; Kolathur; Maduravoyal; Madhavaram; Perambur; Royapuram; Saidapet; Sholinganallur; Thiru-Vi-Ka Nagar; Thirumayilai; Thiruvottiyur; Thousand Lights; Thyagaraya Nagar; Velachery; Villivakkam; Virugambakkam	Chennai Central; Chennai North; Chennai South; Sriperumbudur; Thiruvallur	
Coimbatore	COI	Coimbatore	1 November 1956	None	4,950.7	3,458,045	699	Coimbatore North; Coimbatore South; Pollachi	Anaimalai; Annur; Coimbatore North; Coimbatore South; Kinathukadavu; Madukkarai; Mettupalayam; Perur; Pollachi; Sulur; Valparai	Kavundampalayam; Kinathukadavu; Mettupalayam; Pollachi; Coimbatore North; Coimbatore South; Singanallur; Sulur; Thondamuthur; Valparai	Coimbatore; Nilgiris; Pollachi	
Cuddalore	CUD	Cuddalore	30 September 1993	South Arcot District	3,870	2,605,914	673	Chidambaram; Cuddalore; Vriddachalam	Bhuvanagiri; Chidambaram; Cuddalore; Kattumannarkoil; Kurinjipadi; Panruti; Srimushnam; Titakudi; Veppur; Vriddachalam	Bhuvanagiri; Chidambaram; Cuddalore; Kattumannarkoil; Kurinjipadi; Neyveli; Panruti; Tittakudi; Virudhachalam	Chidambaram; Cuddalore	
Dharmapuri	DHA	Dharmapuri	2 October 1965	Salem	4,735.7	1,506,843	318	Dharmapuri; Harur	Dharmapuri; Harur; Karimangalam; Nallampalli; Palacode; Pappireddipatti; Pennagaram	Dharmapuri; Harur; Palacode; Pappireddipatti; Pennagaram	Dharmapuri	
Dindigul	DIN	Dindigul	15 September 1985	Madurai	6,289.1	2,159,775	343	Dindigul; Kodaikanal; Palani	Athoor; Dindigul-East; Dindigul-West; Gujiliamparai; Kodaikanal; Natham; Nilakottai; Oddanchattiram; Palani; Vedasandur	Athoor; Dindigul; Natham; Nilakottai; Oddanchatram; Palani; Vedasandur	Dindigul; Karur	
Erode	ERO	Erode	31 August 1979	Coimbatore	6,036	2,251,744	373	Erode; Gobichettipalayam	Anthiyur; Bhavani; Erode; Gobichettipalayam; Kodumudi; Modakurichi; Nambiyur; Perundurai; Sathyamangalam; Thalavadi	Anthiyur; Bhavani; Bhavanisagar; Erode East; Erode West; Gobichettipalayam; Modakkurichi; Perundurai	Erode; Nilgiris; Tiruppur	
Kallakurichi	KAL	Kallakurichi	26 November 2019	Viluppuram	3,440.8	1,370,281	398	Kallakkurichi; Thirukoilur	Chinnasalem; Kallakkurichi; Kalvarayan Malai; Sankarapuram; Thirukoilur; Ulundurpet; Vanapuram	Kallakkurichi; Rishivandiyam; Sankarapuram; Tirukkoyilur; Ulundurpettai	Kallakkurichi; Viluppuram	
Kancheepuram	KAC	Kancheepuram	1 July 1997	Chingleput	1,800.2	1,166,401	648	Kancheepuram; Sriperumbudur	Kancheepuram; Kundrathur; Sriperumbudur; Uthiramerur; Walajabad	Kancheepuram; Sriperumbudur; Uthiramerur	Kancheepuram; Sriperumbudur	
Kanyakumari	KAY	Nagercoil	1 November 1956	None	1,729.2	1,870,374	1,082	Nagercoil; Padmanabhapuram	Agastheeswaram; Kalkulam; Killiyoor; Vilavancode; Thiruvattar; Thovalai	Colachal; Kanniyakumari; Killiyur; Nagercoil; Padmanabhapuram; Vilavancode	Kanniyakumari	
Karur	KAR	Karur	30 September 1995	Tiruchirappalli	3,022.3	1,064,493	352	Karur; Kulithalai	Aravakurichi; Kadavur; Karur; Krishnarayapuram; Kulithalai; Manmangalam; Pugalur	Aravakurichi; Karur; Krishnarayapuram; Kulithalai	Karur; Perambalur	
Krishnagiri	KRI	Krishnagiri	9 February 2004	Dharmapuri	5,414.4	1,883,731	348	Hosur; Krishnagiri	Anchetty; Bargur; Denkanikottai; Hosur; Krishnagiri; Pochampalli; Shoolagiri; Uthangarai	Bargur; Hosur; Krishnagiri; Thalli; Uthangarai; Veppanapalli	Krishnagiri	
Madurai	MAD	Madurai	1 November 1956	None	3,846.4	3,038,252	790	Madurai; Melur; Usilampatti	Madurai-East; Madurai-North; Madurai-South; Madurai-West; Kallikudi; Melur; Peraiyur; Thirumangalam; Thirupparankundram; Usilampatti; Vadipatti	Madurai Central; Madurai East; Madurai North; Madurai South; Madurai West; Melur; Sholavandan; Thirumangalam; Thiruparankundram; Usilampatti	Madurai; Theni; Virudhunagar	
Mayiladuthurai	MAY	Mayiladuthurai	28 December 2020	Nagapattinam	1,237.1	918,356	742	Mayiladuthurai; Sirkazhi	Kuthalam; Mayiladuthurai; Sirkazhi; Tharangambadi	Mayiladuthurai; Poompuhar; Sirkazhi	Mayiladuthurai	
Nagapattinam	NAG	Nagapattinam	18 October 1991	Thanjavur	1,459	697,069	478	Nagapattinam; Vedaranyam	Kilvelur; Nagapattinam; Thirukkuvalai; Vedaranyam	Kilvelur; Nagapattinam; Vedaranyam	Nagapattinam	
Namakkal	NAM	Namakkal	1 January 1997	Salem	3,573.4	1,726,601	483	Namakkal; Thiruchengode	Kollimalai; Kumarapalayam; Mohanur; Namakkal; Paramathi-Velur; Rasipuram; Senthamangalam; Thiruchengode	Namakkal; Kumarapalayam; Paramathi-Velur; Rasipuram; Senthamangalam; Thiruchengode	Erode; Namakal	
Nilgiris	NIL	Ooty	1 November 1956	None	2,452.5	735,394	300	Coonoor; Gudalur; Udagamandalam	Coonoor; Gudalur; Kotagiri; Kundah; Pandalur; Udagamandalam	Coonoor; Gudalur; Udagamandalam	Nilgiris	
Perambalur	PER	Perambalur	30 September 1995	Tiruchirappalli	1,836.6	565,223	308	Perambalur	Alathur; Kunnam; Perambalur; Veppanthattai	Kunnam; Perambalur	Perambalur	
Pudukkottai	PUD	Pudukkottai	14 January 1974	Thanjavur and Tiruchirappalli	4,847.8	1,618,345	334	Aranthangi; Illuppur; Pudukkottai	Alangudi; Aranthangi; Avadaiyarkoil; Gandarvakottai; Illuppur; Karambakkudi; Kulathur; Manamelkudi; Ponnamaravathi; Pudukkottai; Thirumayam; Viralimalai	Alangudi; Aranthangi; Gandarvakottai; Pudukottai; Thirumayam; Viralimalai	Karur; Ramanathapuram; Sivaganga; Tiruchirappalli	
Ramanathapuram	RAM	Ramanathapuram	1 November 1956	None	4,243.1	1,353,445	319	Paramakudi; Ramanathapuram	Kadaladi; Kamuthi; Kilakarai; Mudukulathur; Paramakudi; Rajasingamangalam; Ramanathapuram; Rameswaram; Tiruvadanai	Mudukulathur; Paramakudi; Ramanathapuram; Tiruvadanai	Ramanathapuram	
Ranipet	RAN	Ranipet	28 November 2019	Vellore	2,234.3	1,210,277	542	Arakkonam; Ranipet	Arakkonam; Arkadu; Kalavai; Nemili; Sholinghur; Walajapet	Arakkonam; Arcot; Ranipet; Sholingur	Arakkonam	
Salem	SAL	Salem	1 November 1956	None	5,245	3,482,056	669	Attur; Mettur; Salem; Sankagiri	Attur; Idappadi; Gangavalli; Kadayampatti; Mettur; Omalur; Pethanaickenpalayam; Salem; Salem South; Salem West; Sankagiri; Thalaivasal; Vazhapady; Yercaud	Attur; Edappadi; Gangavalli; Mettur; Omalur; Sankari; Salem North; Salem South; Salem West; Veerapandi; Yercaud	Dharmapuri; Kallakkurichi; Namakkal; Salem	
Sivaganga	SIV	Sivaganga	15 March 1985	Ramanathapuram	4,086	1,339,101	328	Devakottai; Sivaganga	Devakottai; Ilayangudi; Kalayarkoil; Karaikudi; Manamadurai; Singampunari; Sivaganga; Tirupathur; Tiruppuvanam	Karaikudi; Manamadurai; Sivaganga; Tirupattur	Sivaganga	
Tenkasi	TEN	Tenkasi	22 November 2019	Tirunelveli	2,916.1	1,407,627	483	Sankarankoil; Tenkasi	Alangulam; Kadayanallur; Sankarankoil; Shenkottai; Sivagiri; Tenkasi; Thiruvengadam; Veerakeralampudur	Alangulam; Kadayanallur; Sankarankovil; Tenkasi; Vasudevanallur	Tenkasi; Tirunelveli	
Thanjavur	THA	Thanjavur	1 November 1956	None	3,396.6	2,405,890	708	Kumbakonam; Pattukkottai; Thanjavur	Budalur; Kumbakonam; Orathanadu; Papanasam; Pattukkottai; Peravurani; Thanjavur; Thiruvaiyaru; Thiruvidaimarudur; Thiruvonam	Kumbakonam; Orathanadu; Papanasam; Pattukottai; Peravurani; Thanjavur; Thiruvayaru; Thiruvidaimarudur	Mayiladuthurai; Thanjavur	
Theni	THE	Theni	25 July 1996	Madurai	3,066	1,245,899	406	Periyakulam; Uthamapalayam	Andipatti; Bodniayakkanur; Theni; Periyakulam; Uthamapalayam	Andipatti; Bodinayakanur; Cumbum; Periyakulam	Theni	
Thoothukudi	THO	Thoothukudi	20 October 1986	Tirunelveli	4,621	1,750,176	379	Kovilpatti; Tiruchendur; Thoothukudi	Eral; Ettayapuram; Kayatharu; Kovilpatti; Ottapidaram; Sathankulam; Thiruvaikundam; Tiruchendur; Thoothukudi; Vilathikulam	Vilathikulam; Thoothukudi; Tiruchendur; Srivaikuntam; Ottapidaram; Kovilpatti	Thoothukudi	
Tiruchirappalli	TIC	Tiruchirappalli	1 November 1956	None	4,407	2,722,290	618	Lalgudi; Manachanallur; Musiri; Srirangam; Tiruchirappalli	Lalgudi; Manachanallur; Manapparai; Marungapuri; Musiri; Srirangam; Tiruchirappalli West; Tiruchirappalli East; Thiruverumbur; Thottiyam; Thuraiyur	Lalgudi; Manachanallur; Manapparai; Musiri; Srirangam; Thiruverumbur; Thuraiyur; Tiruchirappalli East; Tiruchirappalli West	Karur; Perambalur; Tiruchirappalli	
Tirunelveli	TIN	Tirunelveli	1 November 1956	None	3842.4	1,665,253	433	Cheranmahadevi; Tirunelveli	Ambasamudram; Cheranmahadevi; Manur; Nanguneri; Palayamkottai; Radhapuram; Tisayanvilai; Tirunelveli	Ambasamudram; Nanguneri; Palayamkottai; Radhapuram; Tirunelveli	Tirunelveli	
Tirupathur	TIA	Tirupattur	28 November 2019	Vellore	1,792.9	1,111,812	620	Tirupathur; Vaniyambadi	Ambur; Natrampalli; Tirupathur; Vaniyambadi	Ambur; Jolarpet; Tirupathur; Vaniyambadi	Tiruvannamalai; Vellore	
Tiruppur	TIP	Tiruppur	22 February 2009	Coimbatore and Erode	5,186.3	2,479,052	478	Dharapuram; Tiruppur; Udumalaipettai	Avinashi; Dharapuram; Kangeyam; Madathukulam; Palladam; Tiruppur North; Tiruppur South; Udumalaipettai; Uthukuli	Avinashi; Dharapuram; Kangeyam; Madathukulam; Palladam; Tiruppur North; Tiruppur South; Udumalaipettai	Coimbatore; Erode; Nilgiris; Pollachi; Tiruppur	
Tiruvallur	TAL	Tiruvallur	1 July 1997	Chingleput	3,444.2	3,728,104	1,082	Ponneri; Tiruttani; Tiruvallur	Avadi; Gummidipoondi; Pallipattu; Ponneri; Poonamallee; R. K. Pettai; Tiruttani; Tiruvallur; Uthukkottai	Avadi; Gummidipoondi; Ponneri; Poonamallee; Tiruttani; Tiruvallur	Arakkonam; Tiruvallur	
Tiruvannamalai	TAN	Tiruvannamalai	30 September 1989	North Arcot	6,191	2,464,875	398	Aarani; Cheyyar; Tiruvannamalai	Aarani; Chengam; Chetpet; Cheyyar; Jamunamarathur; Kalasapakkam; Kilpennathur; Polur; Thandarampattu; Tiruvannamalai; Vandavasi; Vembakkam	Arani; Chengam; Cheyyar; Kalasapakkam; Kilpennathur; Polur; Tiruvannamalai; Vandavasi	Arani; Tiruvannamalai	
Tiruvarur	TAR	Thiruvarur	1 January 1997	Nagapattinam and Thanjavur	2,161	1,264,277	585	Mannargudi; Tiruvarur	Koothanallur; Kudavasal; Mannargudi; Nannilam; Needamangalam; Thiruthiraipoondi; Tiruvarur; Valangaiman; Muthupet	Mannargudi; Nannilam; Thiruthuraipoondi; Thiruvarur	Nagapattinam; Thanjavur	
Vellore	VEL	Vellore	30 September 1989	North Arcot	2,222.1	1,614,242	726	Gudiyatham; Vellore	Anaicut; Gudiyatham; Pernampattu; Katpadi; Kilvaithinankuppam; Vellore	Anaikattu; Gudiyatham; Katpadi; Kilvaithinankuppam; Vellore	Arakkonam; Vellore	
Viluppuram	VIL	Viluppuram	30 September 1993	South Arcot	3,725.5	2,093,003	562	Tindivanam; Villupuram	Gingee; Kandachipuram; Marakkanam; Melmalaianur; Tindivanam; Vanur; Vikravandi; Villupuram; Thiruvennainallur	Gingee; Mailam; Tindivanam; Vanur; Villupuram; Vikravandi	Arani; Villupuram	
Virudhunagar	VIR	Virudhunagar	15 March 1985	Ramanathapuram	4,288.0	1,942,288	453	Aruppukkottai; Sattur; Sivakasi	Aruppukkottai; Kariapatti; Rajapalayam; Sattur; Sivakasi; Srivilliputhur; Tiruchuli; Virudhunagar; Watrap; Vembakottai	Aruppukkottai; Rajapalayam; Sattur; Sivakasi; Srivilliputhur; Tiruchuli; Virudhunagar	Ramanathapuram; Tenkasi; Virudhunagar	

=== Former districts ===
District	Span	Successor districts	Map
Chingleput	1956–98	Kanchipuram, Chengalpattu and Tiruvallur	
North Arcot	1956–89	Tiruvannamalai, Vellore, Ranipet and Tirupattur	
South Arcot	1956–93	Cuddalore, Villupuram and Kallakurichi	

== Demand for new districts ==
Proposed district	Current district	Notes
Arani	Tiruvannamalai	Demand by residents to carve out a new district to bridge geographical distances to the current headquarters.
Gobichettipalayam	Erode	Formal petition submitted by residents seeking dedicated district status to streamline local administration.
Kovilpatti	Thoothukudi	Demanded to optimize governance and infrastructure planning in the southern industrial and agrarian tracts.
Kumbakonam	Thanjavur	Demand aimed at managing the central region's specific administrative needs.
Mannargudi	Tiruvarur	Demanded to decentralize administration in the taluks of Mannargudi, Needamangalam and Thiruthiraipoondi.
Palani	Dindigul	Sought by local residents advocating for the bifurcation of Dindigul district to establish closer regional governance.
Pollachi	Coimbatore	Demanded to decentralize administration in the expansive western belt.
Ponneri	Tiruvallur	Public demand to create a distinct administrative hub to manage urbanization and industrial sprawl north of Chennai.
Sivakasi	Virudhunagar	Advocated by local fireworks and printing industry bodies, alongside residents, to provide dedicated civic and industrial governance.
Virudhachalam	Cuddalore	Demanded by local traders and the public to improve administrative accessibility and service delivery.

== See also ==
- List of developmental administrative units of Tamil Nadu
- List of revenue divisions of Tamil Nadu
- List of districts in Tamil Nadu by Human Development Index
