= Lakshmipuram, Theni =

Lakshmipuram L.Pudupatti
- village
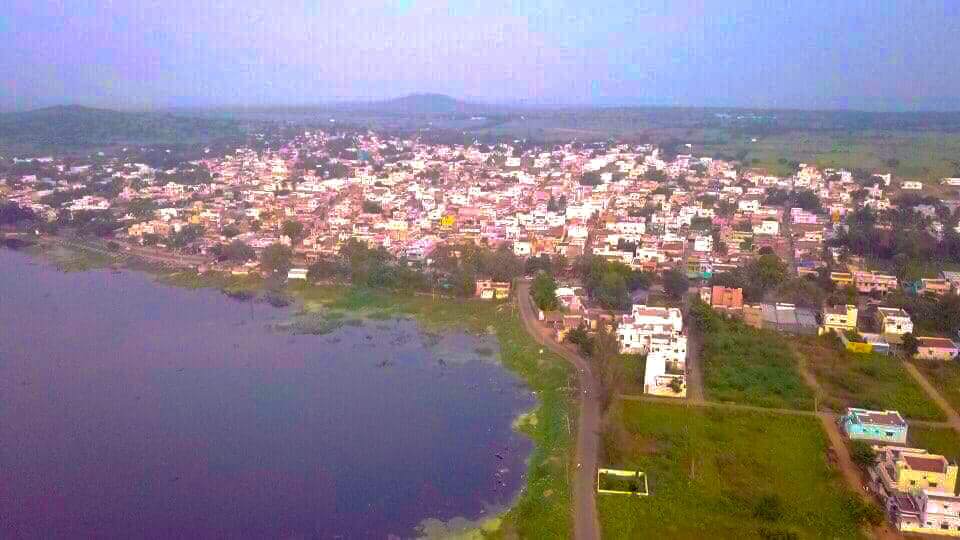
- Aerial view of Lakshmipuram Village from Western Ghats
- Interactive map of Lakshmipuram
- Coordinates: 10°4′43.721″N 77°31′18.23″E
- Country: India
- State: Tamil Nadu
- District: Theni

Population (2011)
  - Total: 10,000+
- Time zone: UTC+5:30 (IST)
- PIN: 625523

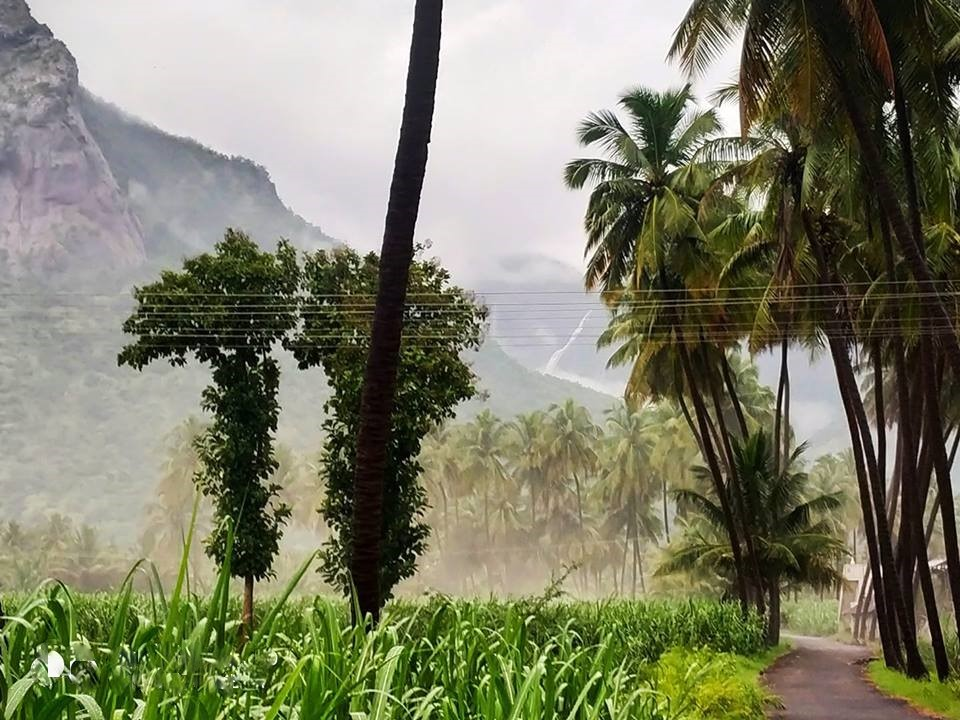
Morning view of Western Ghats from Lakshmipuram Village.

Latchumipuram (L.Pudhupatti) is a village in south Tamil Nadu, India. It is situated at the foothills of the Western Ghats, 9 kilometres (5.6 mi) from the city of Theni. It is 7 kilometres (4.3 mi) from Periyakulam on NH 183. The population of this village is over 10,000. This village is also known for its various small water falls . where the water comes from the hills are seen beautifully. One of the beautiful place in Theni district

Latchumipuram is surrounded by Kodaikanal Taluk to the north, Andipatti Taluk to the south, Theni Taluk to the south, and Batlagundu Taluk to the east. Latchumipuram village is Located in Periyakulam Taluk, Theni district, Madurai Region, State Of Tamil Nadu in South India. It is 489 km from the state capital Chennai.

Lakshmipuram village panchayat has set a role model in greening the district and disposing of waste generated from the panchayat. The village won the Nirmal Puraskar award on two occasions from The Government of India, The village is famous for cultivation of sugarcane mainly and various other seasoned crops like Cotton, Maize, Rice, Mango, Banana and Coconut. Several sugarcane auction markets are located near by the village.

The Theni district court is located in this village.

== Famous Festivals ==
Pongal festival is the famous religious festival observed by the locals in early or later school holidays depends on village organising committee decision. It is a week-long celebration starting at the Karupasamy Kovil temple in Madurai. Pongal starts on Wednesday and lasts until Sunday in which most of villagers also take part.

== Transport ==
There is a railway station at Theni recently, this train runs from Chennai Central to Bodinayyakur on Monday, Wednesday and Friday. It is 10 km from Theni railway station to Lakshmipuram.
