= Vellar River (Southern Tamil Nadu) =

Vellar River South Vellar River
- Map of the Vellar River and its drainage basin within Tamil Nadu

Location
- Country: India
- State: Tamil Nadu
- Districts: Pudukkottai, Tiruchirappalli, Dindigul

Physical characteristics
- Source: Headwaters
  - location: Kumirikatti forest reserve
- Mouth: Palk Strait
  - location: Manamelkudi taluk, Pudukkottai district, Tamil Nadu
  - coordinates: 10°03′50″N 79°14′30″E
- Length: 137 kilometres (85 mi)
- Basin size: 2,034 square kilometres (785 sq mi)
- Discharge
  - location: River mouth
  - average: 446 million metres^{3}/year

Basin features
- Population: 805,000 (2007)
- Tributaries
  - left: Gundar River
  - right: Nerunjikudiyar River

The Vellar River or South Vellar River is a non-perennial river in the Indian state of Tamil Nadu that flows southeast into the Palk Strait, part of the Bay of Bengal.

== Course ==
The river begins as several small streams in the area around the Kumirakatti forest reserve about 9 km west of Karumalai village. The stream progresses east past Karumalai and Tovarankurichchi, where it turns to the northeast. South of Kodumbalur, it receives the surplus flow of the Vembar retention basin and returns to its southeastern course.

Near the village of Kummankudi, it is joined on its right bank by its largest tributary, the Nerunjikudiyar River, which flows for about 30 km east and originates from a retention basin in Thirumayam taluk. The Vellar then curves to the east for a short distance, passing to the south of Pudukkottai. At the village of Kadayakudi, it is joined on its left bank by its second largest tributary, the Gundar River, which flows for about 7.5 km southeast through Pudukkottai and originates from the Kavinadu retention basin to the west of that city.

After this confluence, it turns southeast again, passing by Arimalam and Aranthangi. After it passes Avudaiyarkoil, it turns to the east, continuing to where it empties into the sea northeast of Manamelkudi at Mumpalai village in Manamelkudi taluk, where it forms a small estuary.

The river, which runs for a total length of 137 kilometres (85 mi) flows through parts of Dindigul, Tiruchirappalli, and Pudukkottai districts. Within Pudukkottai district, it forms part of the border between Illuppur, Pudukkottai, and Alangudi taluks on its left bank, and Ponnamaravathi and Thirumayam taluks on its right bank.

== Basin ==
The river's drainage basin makes up the southern and westernmost part of the Agniyar basin, one of Tamil Nadu's 17 major river basins, which is bounded to the north by the Kaveri basin and to the south by the Pambar basin. Two other rivers’ sub-basins, those of the Ambuliyar and Agniyar, border to the northeast and northwest of Vellar's watershed respectively, and make up the rest of the Agniyar basin. The river's sub-basin covers 2034 km^{2} of land mostly in Dindigul, Tiruchirappalli, and Pudukkottai districts, although smaller areas in Sivaganga and Thanjavur districts are also within the watershed. In 2007, the sub-basin was inhabited by about 805,000 people.

== Irrigation and flow ==
The Vellar River is extensively dammed in order to draw from the river, mostly for agricultural purposes such as irrigation, although it is also used to supply water for industrial and domestic demand. Along its course, the river is dammed 17 times, and water from it is diverted to a total of 161 storage tanks/retention basins with an approximate total capacity of 270 million cubic meters, and to 13,213 acres of farmland.

Total demand consistently exceeds total potential, resulting in annual water deficits which prevent the river from actually discharging into the sea. Surplus flow in the Vellar was last recorded in 1993, with a registered volume of 446 million cubic meters. Compared to the nearby Agniyar and Ambuliyar rivers, which do consistently reach the sea during each year's wet season, the Vellar lacks significant tributaries towards its mouth such as the Maharajasamundram, the main tributary of the Agniyar River, which joins the Agniyar only a short distance from where it discharges. In comparison, the Nerunjikudiyar and Gundar rivers are much smaller and further upstream.
