= Srivilliputtur Lok Sabha constituency =

Srivilliputtur
- Former Lok Sabha constituency

Constituency details
- Country: India
- State: Madras
- Established: 1951
- Abolished: 1962

Srivilliputtur was a Lok Sabha constituency in Madras. It ceased to exist after the delimination by Election Commission in 1961. Former Chief Minister of Madras K. Kamaraj won in 1952 from this constituency.

== Extant ==
=== 1951 ===
In the 1951 Delimitation it consisted of the Srivilliputhur and Sattur taluks and Kariapatti firka of Aruppukkottai taluk of the Ramanathapuram District.

=== 1956 ===
In the 1956 Delimitation it consisted of the Srivilliputhur, Sattur, Aruppukkotai and Mudukulathur taluks of Ramanathapuram district; and Koilpatti taluk and Thiruvengadam firka in Sankarankoil taluk, of Tirunelveli district. In this the constituency became two-membered

By the 1961 Delimitation exercise it was abolished. And its Member of Parliament served till 1962 when the delimitation came into effect.

== Members of the Parliament ==
Year	Member	Party
1952	K. Kamaraj Nadar	Indian National Congress
1955^	S. S .Natrajan	Indian National Congress
1957	U. Muthuramalinga Thevar	Independent politician
1957	R. S. Arumugam	Indian National Congress

== Election results ==
=== 1952 ===
1951–52 Indian general election : Srivilliputtur
Party	Candidate	Votes	%	±%
INC	K Kamaraj Nadar	104,829	46.77	
Independent	G. D. Naidu	77,835	34.73	
Independent	C. Arumugasani Nadar	41,450	18.50	
Margin of victory		26,994	12.04	
Total valid votes		2,24,114		
Turnout		2,24,114	66.04	
Registered electors		3,39,344		
INC win (new seat)				

=== 1955 Bye-Election ===
1955 Bye-Election : Srivilliputhur
Party	Candidate	Votes	%	±%
INC	S. S. Natarjan	64,502		
PSP	S. A. Rahim	21,814		
Margin of victory				
Total valid votes				
Rejected ballots				
Turnout				
Registered electors				
INC hold		Swing		

=== 1957 ===
1957 Indian general election : Srivilliputhur
Party	Candidate	Votes	%	±%
AIFB	U. Muthuramalinga Thevar	206,999	24.17	
INC	S. S. Natarajan	1,67,676	19.58	
INC	R. S. Arumugam	150,087	17.53	
Independent	A. Velu	1,33,996	15.65	
Independent	V. V. Ramasamy	80,227	9.37	
CPI	M. Ramadoss	51,155	5.97	
Independent	K. S. Krishnan	37,886	4.42	
CPI	A. Srinivasan	28,293	3.30	
Margin of victory				
Total valid votes		8,56,319	48.83	
Turnout		8,56,319		
Registered electors		8,76,837		
Independent gain from		Swing		
INC win (new seat)				

1st seat gained by Ind from INC, 2nd seat won by INC.
