= Madura District (Madras Presidency) =

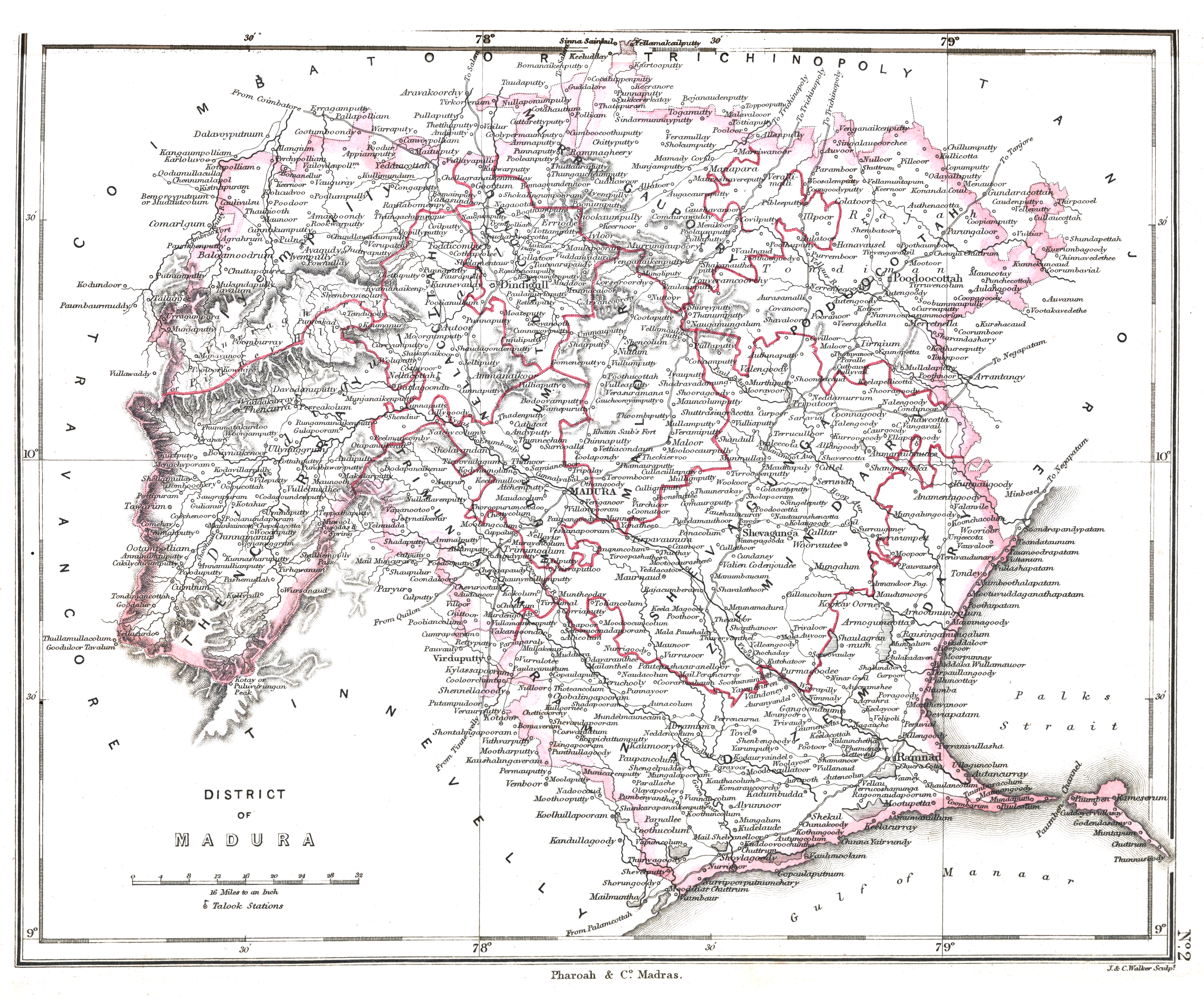
Madura District 1854

Madura District (current Madurai) was one of the districts of the Madras Presidency of British India. It covered the present-day districts of Madurai, Dindigul, Theni, Ramanathapuram, Sivagangai and parts of Virudhunagar District in the Indian state of Tamil Nadu.

== History ==
Madura is a district were the centre of the Pandya kingdom and its capital city of Madurai was flourishing ever since the Sangam period. In the 10th century AD, the region was conquered by the rising Chola power. The Pandyas governed as subordinate from the 10th to the 13th century AD when they asserted their independence and established their supremacy over the declining Cholas. After a short and progressive rule, the Pandyas were defeated by the Delhi Sultanate whose ruled Alauddin Khalji sacked Madura. The region was ruled by the Madurai Sultanate for some time before it was conquered by the Vijayanagar Empire. The Vijayanagar kings were succeeded by the Madurai Nayak kingdom whose demise in 1736 left behind a huge void. After a short period of anarchy, Madura was conquered by the British East India Company and the district of Madura was carved out.

== Taluks ==
Madura district was sub-divided into 15 taluks, including 5 zamindari taluks of Ramnad estate and 3 zamindari taluks of Sivaganga estate.

- Dindigul (Area: 2,910 square kilometres (1,122 sq mi); Headquarters: Dindigul)
- Kodaikanal
- Madurai (Area: 1,160 square kilometres (446 sq mi); Headquarters: Madura)
- Melur (Area: 1,260 square kilometres (485 sq mi); Headquarters: Melur)
- Mudukulathur (Part of Ramnad estate)
- Palani
- Paramakudi (Part of Ramnad estate)
- Periyakulam (Area: 3,900 square kilometres (1,520 sq mi); Headquarters: Periyakulam)
- Ramnad (Part of Ramnad estate)
- Sivaganga (Part of Sivaganga estate)
- Tiruchuli (Part of Ramnad estate)
- Tirumangalam (Area: 1,930 square kilometres (745 sq mi); Headquarters: Tirumangalam)
- Tirupattur (Part of Sivaganga estate)
- Tiruppuvanam (Part of Sivaganga estate)
- Tiruvadanai (Part of Ramnad estate) .
- Virudhunagar

== Administration ==
As of 1901, for the purposes of administration, Madurai district was divided into four sub-divisions, Madura and Melur sub-divisions being assigned to one Deputy Collector each:

- Dindigul sub-division: Dindigul, Kodaikanal, Palni and Periyakulam taluks.
- Ramnad sub-division: Ramnad estate and Sivaganga estate.
- Madura sub-division: Madura and Tirumangalam taluks.
- Melur sub-division: Melur taluk.

== Sources ==
- The Imperial Gazetteer of India, Volume 16. London: Clarendon Press. 1908.
