= National Highway 79 (India) =

National highway in Tamil Nadu, India

National Highway 79
- Map of the National Highway in red
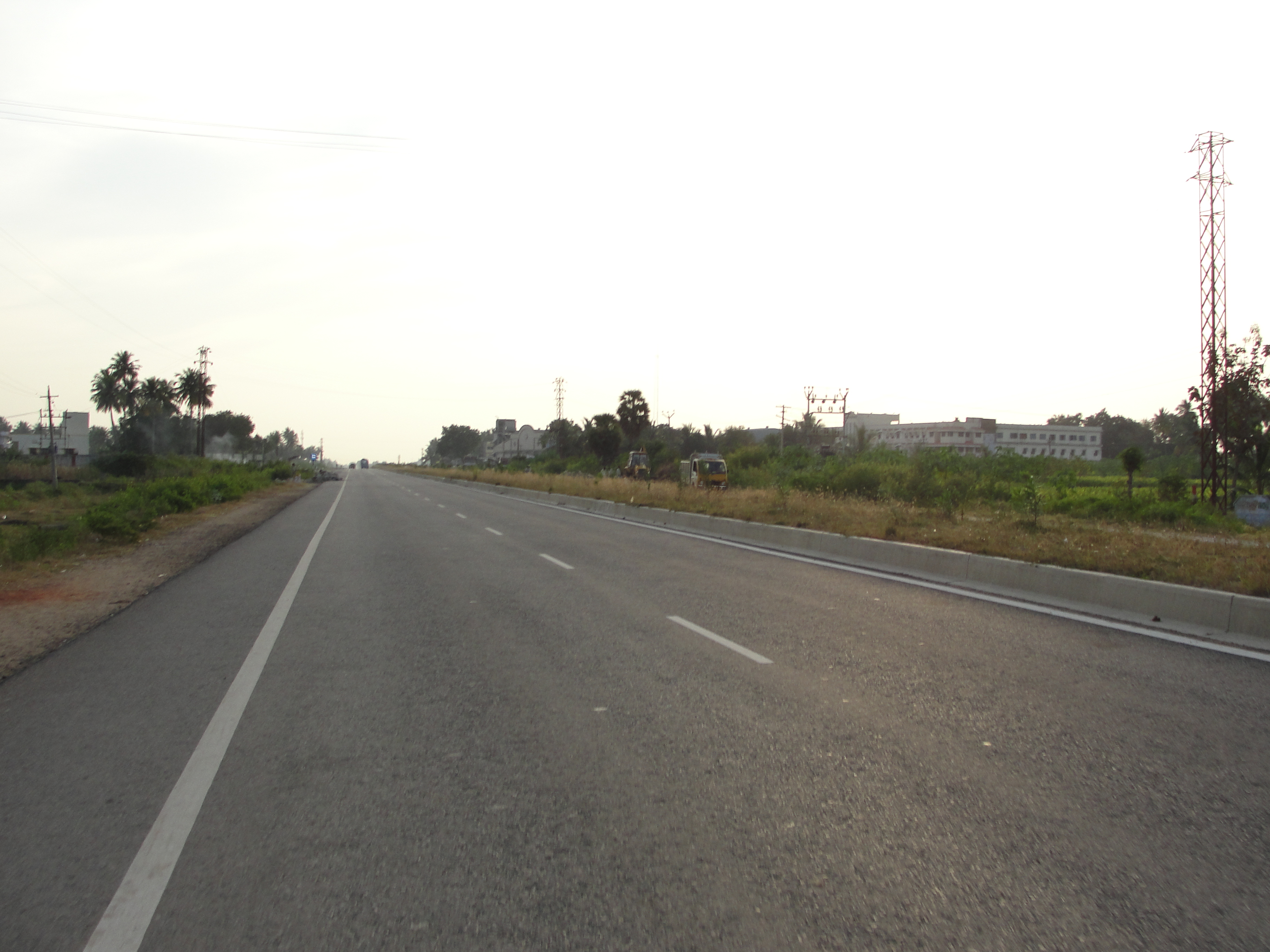

Route information
- Part of AH20
- Length: 134.2 km (83.4 mi)

Major junctions
- West end: Salem, Tamil Nadu
- East end: Ulundurpettai, Villupuram district, Tamil Nadu

Location
- Country: India
- States: Tamil Nadu
- Primary destinations: Ulundrupet - Kallakurichi - Chinnasalem - Attur - Pethanaickenpalayam - Vazhapadi - Salem

Highway system
- Roads in India; Expressways; National; State; Asian
← NH 44	→ NH 38

National Highway 79 (NH 79) is a National Highway in India entirely within the state of Tamil Nadu. It runs between Ulundurpettai and Salem in the Indian state of Tamil Nadu for a total of 134 km (83 mi). It connects with NH 44 and NH 544 at Salem. NH 79 connects NH 68 and SH 69 at Ulundurpettai and SH 6 at kallakurichi. It was upgraded to a dual carriageway road in two phases on a Build-operate-transfer basis by Reliance Infrastructure and Maytas.

== Traffic ==
NH 79 is an important connecting road for vehicles travelling from the two major cities of Coimbatore and Kochi. NH 79 directly connects Salem with Chennai, and indirectly Coimbatore, Erode, Tirupur and the cities around these areas.

== Route ==
Ulundurpettai - Elavanasur kottai - Thiyagadurgam - Kallakurichi - Chinnasalem, Thalaivasal - Kattukottai - Attur - Pethanaickenpalayam - Vazhapadi - Salem.

== Junctions list ==
NH 44 Terminal near Salem.
NH 179A near Salem
NH 136 near Attur
NH 532 near Chinnasalem
NH 38 Terminal near Ulundurpettai.

== Gallery ==
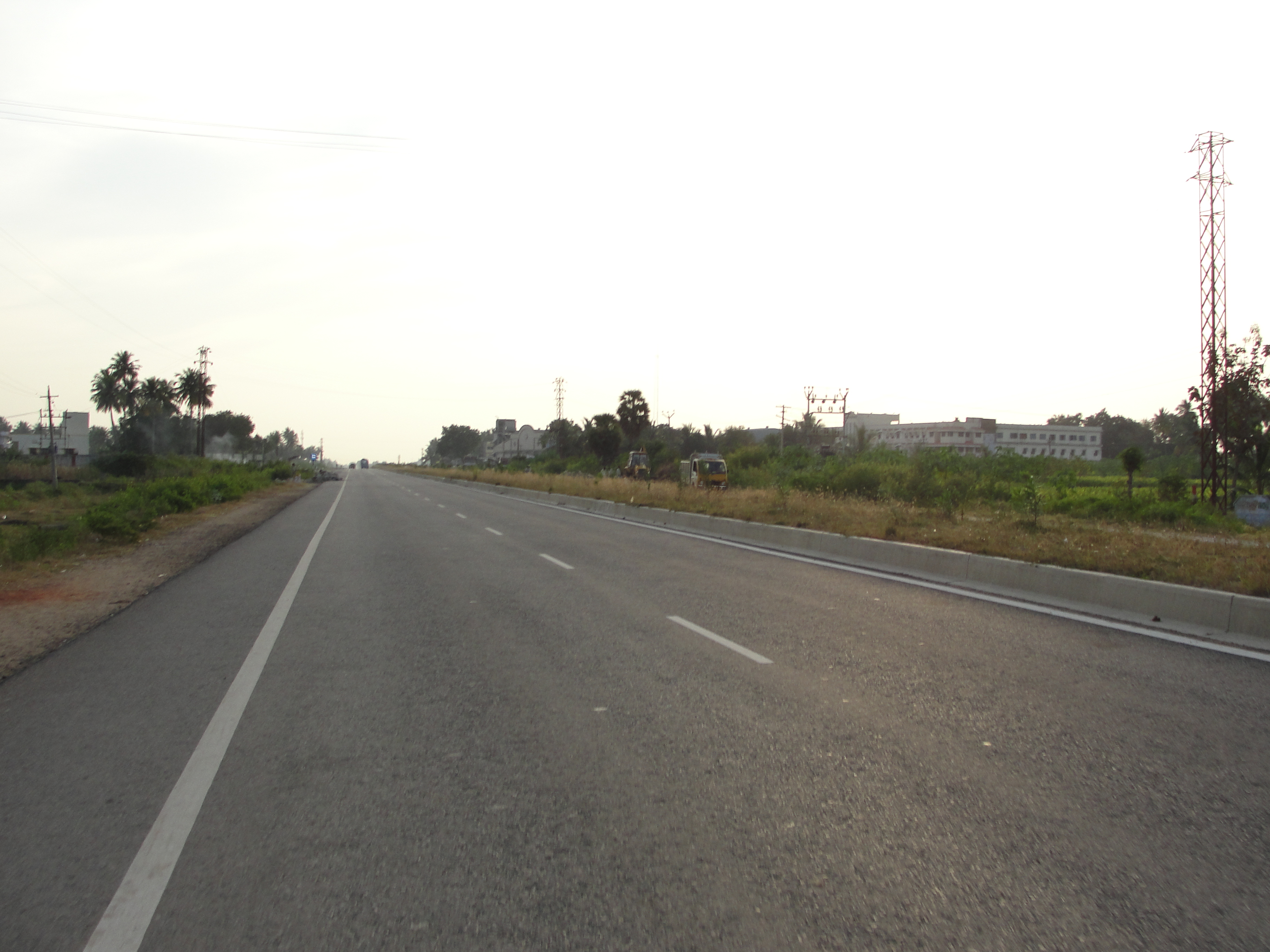
NH 79 near Kallakurichi in Villupuram district, Tamil Nadu.

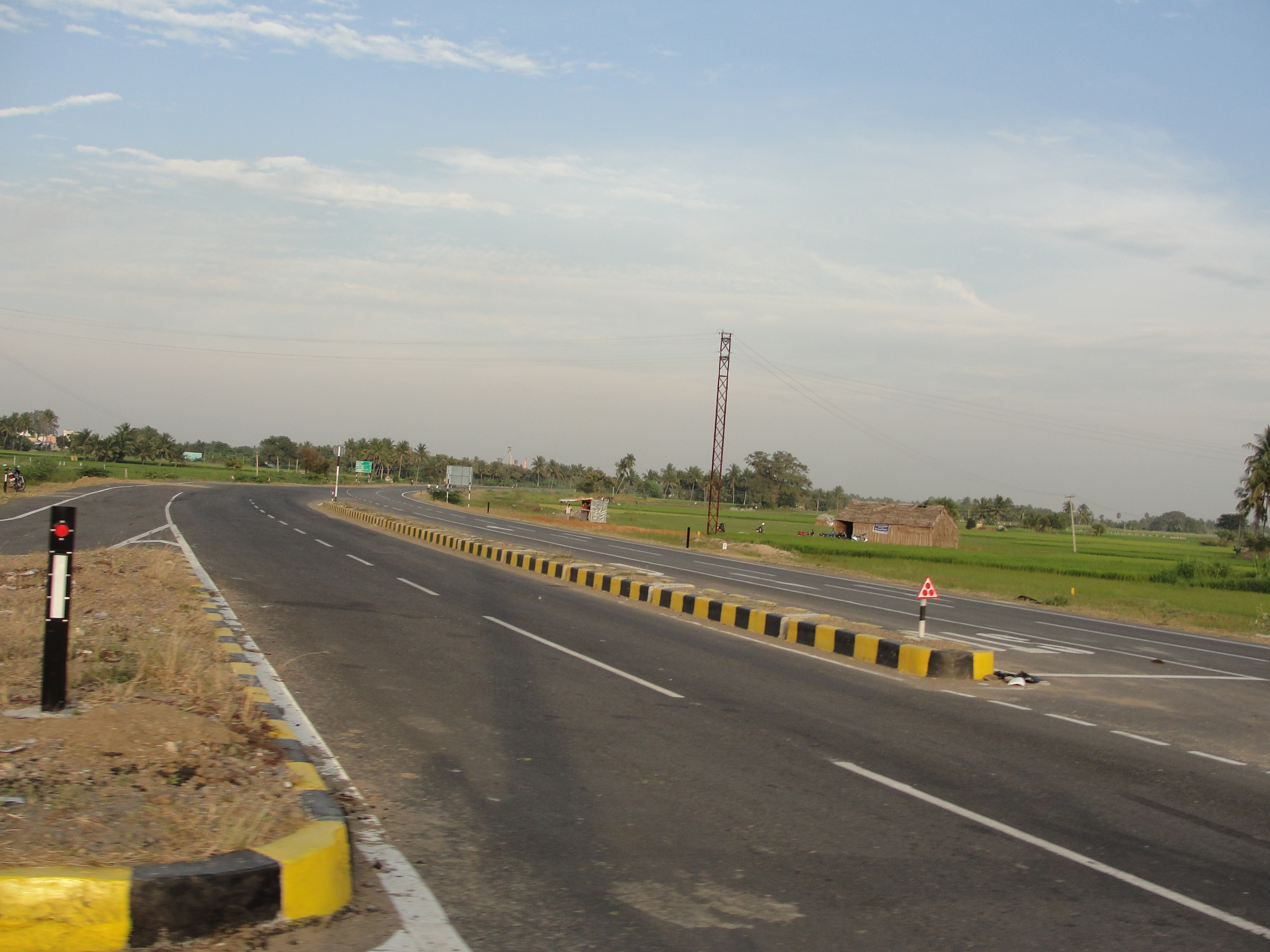
NH 79 near Kallakurichi, Villupuram district, Tamil Nadu

== See also ==
- List of national highways in India
- List of national highways in India by state
- National Highways Development Project
