= Kalvarayan Hills taluk =

Kalvarayan Hills taluk Kalvarayanmalai taluk
- Taluk
- Interactive map of Kalvarayan Hills taluk
- Coordinates: 11°48′N 78°42′E
- Country: India
- State: Tamil Nadu
- District: Kallakurichi

Area
  - Total: 550.7 km^{2} (212.6 sq mi)

Population (2011)
  - Total: 41,025
  - Density: 74.50/km^{2} (192.9/sq mi)

Languages
  - Official: Tamil
- Time zone: UTC+5:30 (IST)

Kalvarayan Hills taluk or Kalvarayanmalai taluk is one of the six taluks of Kallakurichi district in the Indian state of Tamil Nadu.

== Administration ==
Kalvarayan Hills taluk was created following the 2019 bifurcation of Villupuram district, which created Kallakurichi district. The district was created by splitting off 5 taluks of Villupuram district, and as part of the creation, parts of the western Sankarapuram and Chinnasalem taluks were used to create Kalvarayan Hills taluk. It is within the Kallakurichi revenue division of the district, the state assembly constituency of Sankarapuram, and the Lok Sabha constituency of Kallakurichi. The taluk consists of one panchayat union and two revenue blocks, which are composed of 44 revenue villages and 15 village panchayats.

== Geography ==
Kalvarayan Hills taluk is in the westernmost part of Kallakurichi district, and covers 550.7 square kilometres (212.6 sq mi) of land in the eastern part of the Kalvarayan Hills for which the taluk is named. Within Kallakurichi district, it is bordered by Sankarapuram taluk to the northeast, and by Chinnasalem taluk to the southeast. It is also bordered by the Pethanaickenpalayam taluk of Salem district to the south and west, the Harur taluk of Dharmapuri district to the northwest, and the Thandarampattu taluk of Tiruvannamalai district to the north. Rivers in the taluk include the Mani, Muktha, and Gomukhi.

== Demographics ==
As of 2019, the taluk had a population of 41,025 people living in an area of 550.7 square kilometres (212.6 sq mi), resulting in a population density of 74.496/km^{2} (192.944/sq mi).
