= Nagapattinam (disambiguation) =

Nagapattinam (formerly Negapatam) is a town in the Indian state of Tamil Nadu.

Nagapattinam may also refer to:

- Nagapattinam district, a coastal district of Tamil Nadu state in southern India
- Nagapattinam (Lok Sabha constituency), a Lok Sabha constituency in Tamil Nadu
- Nagapattinam (State Assembly Constituency), a state assembly constituency in Tamil Nadu
- Nagapattinam division, a revenue division of Nagapattinam district in Tamil Nadu, India
- Nagapattinam taluk, a taluk of Nagapattinam district of the Indian state of Tamil Nadu
- Nagapattinam block, a revenue block in the Nagapattinam taluk of Nagapattinam district, Tamil Nadu, India

== See also ==
- Battle of Negapatam (disambiguation)
