= Gudalur =

Gudalur may refer to these places in Tamil Nadu, India:

- Gudalur (Coimbatore district), a suburb of Coimbatore
- Gudalur, Nilgiris, a city in the Nilgiris district
  - Gudalur (State Assembly Constituency), constituency in the Nilgiris district
  - Gudalur block, a revenue block of the Nilgiris district
  - Gudalur division, a revenue division of the Nilgiris district
  - Gudalur taluk, a subdistrict of the Nilgiris district
  - Gudalur Janmam Abolition Act, 1969 Indian land reform act
- Gudalur, Theni, a town in Theni district
