= Seithur =

- town
- Koomatchi Malai, Seithur

- Location in Tamil Nadu, India
- Coordinates: 9°24′27″N 77°27′14″E
- Country: India
- State: Tamil nadu
- District: Virudhunagar
- Taluk: Rajapalayam

Government
  - Type: Logal government of Tamil Nadu

Population (2001)
  - Total: 18,193

Languages
  - Official: Tamil
- Time zone: UTC+5:30 (IST)
- PIN: 626121

Seithur is a small panchayat town in Rajapalaiyam taluk, Virudhunagar district in the Indian state of Tamil Nadu. It is located on the Rajapalayam to Tenkasi National Highway 744, 65 km from Courtallam, and 5km from the Sasthakovil river. There are many attractions near Seithur. The Tamil film actor Samuthirakani was born here in 1973.

== Nature ==
The nature around the Western Ghats is green and forested.

== Demographics ==
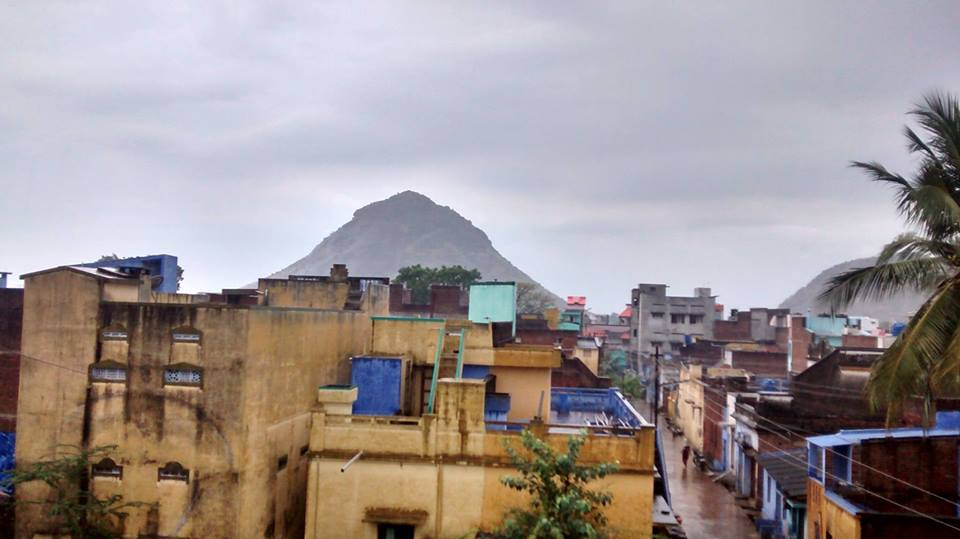
Seithur in 2015

As reported in the 2001 India census, Seithur had a population of 18,012. The total population consisted of 49% males and 51% females. Seithur had an average literacy rate 82%, greater than the national average of 59.5%, with male literacy being 88%, and female literacy being 77%. In Seithur, 11% of the population is under 6 years of age.

== Facilities ==
There are many nurseries, a primary school, and a government secondary school, a government hospital, two police stations: a SUB-REGISTRAR office that is the head facility for the nearest 18 villages all places freely donated by Seithur Zamindar.

== Economy ==
Agriculture is the main industry in the town, which produces paddy, cotton, coconut and sugarcane. Other common professions in the town include tailoring, and work in mills.
