= Myaladumparai =

Village in Tamil Nadu, India

Myaladumparai Mayiladumparai
- Village
- Location within Tamil Nadu Location within India
- Coordinates: 09°47′14″N 77°30′59″E
- Country: India
- State: Tamil Nadu
- District: Theni
- Taluk: Andipatti

Government
  - Type: Gram Panchayat

Area
  - Total: 120.75 km^{2} (46.62 sq mi)
- Elevation: 356 m (1,168 ft)

Population (2011)
  - Total: 29,731
  - Density: 246.22/km^{2} (637.71/sq mi)

Languages
  - Official: Tamil
- Time zone: UTC+5:30 (IST)
- PIN: 625579
- STD code: 04554

Myaladumparai, also known as Mayiladumparai, is a village in Theni district, Tamil Nadu, India. It is located in Andipatti taluk, about 36 kilometers southwest of the subdistrict headquarter Andipatti. As of the year 2011, the village had a total population of 29,731.

== Geography ==
Myaladumparai is situated on the eastern bank of Vaigai River, with the State Highway 101 running through it. The village covers a total area of 12075 hectares. Archaeologists have discovered iron objects at six sites in Tamil Nadu;including near Mayiladumparai, dating back to 2,953–3,345 BCE.

== Demographics ==
According to the 2011 census of India, there were 29,731 people residing in 8,628 households in Myaladumparai. Its literacy rate was 58.71%, significantly lower than the state average of 80.09%.
