= Thirukanangur =

Village in Tamil Nadu, India

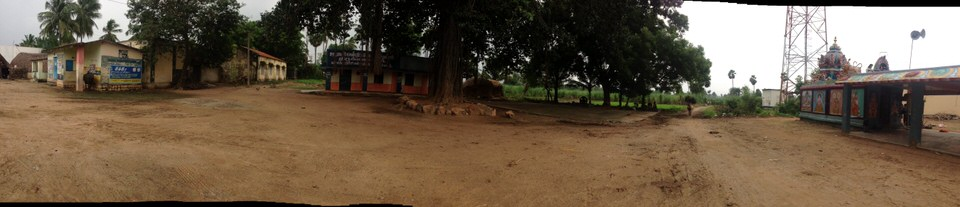

Thirukanangur is a village in Sankarapuram Taluk, Kallakurichi district in southern India state of Tamil Nadu.
