= Udayarpalayam (disambiguation) =

Udayarpalayam (Tamil: உடையார்பாளையம்), is a panchayat town near Jayankondam in Ariyalur district.

Udayarpalayam may also refer to:

- Udayarpalayam taluk, a taluk of Ariyalur district.
- Udayarpalayam division, a revenue division of Ariyalur district.
