= Udhvaganathar Temple =

Hindu temple in Tamil Nadu, India

Udhvaganathar Temple is a Hindu temple located at Thirumananjeri in the Kuthalam taluk of Mayiladuthurai district in Tamil Nadu, India. It is dedicated to the goddess Kokila.

== Location ==
Udhvaganathar Temple is located at a distance of 5 kilometres from Kuthalam on the Kumbakonam-Mayiladuthurai road.

== Deity ==
The presiding deity is Kokila.

== Speciality ==
Worship is offered by unmarried people and couples desiring children.
