= Thekkupalayam =

- Interactive map of Thekkupalayam
- Coordinates: 11.1325°N 76.9431°E
- Country: India
- State: Tamil Nadu
- Districts of Tamil Nadu: Coimbatore
- PIN: 641020

Thekkupalayam is a community in Coimbatore district, Tamil Nadu, India.
