= Erumalainayakkanpatti =

- Village panchayat
- Location in Tamil Nadu, India
- Coordinates: 10°07′35.6″N 77°37′57.5″E
- Country: India
- State: Tamil Nadu
- District: Theni
- Taluk: periyakulam
- Founder: Erumalainayakkanpatti people

Government
  - Type: Village panchayat Council
  - Body: Erumalainayakkanpatti Village panchayat
  - Chief Minister: Edappadi K. Palanisamy
  - Theni M.P: Parthipan.R
  - Periyakulam M.L.A: Kathirkamu.K
- Elevation: 296 m (971 ft)
- Demonym(s): Tamils, Indian

Languages
  - Official: Tamil (தமிழ்)
- Time zone: UTC+5:30 (IST)
- PIN: 625602
- Area code: 04542

Erumalainaickenpatti is a village in Periyakulam Block in Theni District of Tamil Nadu State, India.It is located 26 km towards East from District headquarters Theni. 10 km from Periyakulam.505 km from State capital Chennai.
