= Sulankurichi =

Village in Tamil Nadu, India

Sulankurichi is a village located in Sankarapuram taluk, Kallakurichi district. It is 11 km from Kallakurichi, 11 km from Thiyagadurgam and 22 km from Sankarapuram. Sulankurichi is serviced by buses from Kallakurichi, Thiyagadurgam and Sankarapuram.
