= Othavanthankudi =

Othavanthankudi is a village in Sirkazhi taluk, Mayiladuthurai district, Tamil Nadu, India. The village is located in the Sirkazhi legislative assembly constituency. The village includes a St. Anthony's church. Othavanthankudi is connected to Sirkazhi, Chidambaram and Pazhaiyar by bus.
