= Parthibanur =

- Town
- Location within Tamil Nadu Location within India
- Coordinates: 9°36′00″N 78°27′00″E
- Country: India
- State: Tamil Nadu
- District: Ramanathapuram
- Subdistrict: Paramakudi
- Elevation: 41 m (135 ft)
- Time zone: UTC+05:30 (IST)
- Pincode: 623608

Parthibanur is a panchayath in Ramanathapuram district, Tamil Nadu in southern India belonging to Paramakudi Taluk, away from 61 km from Madurai and 54 km from District headquarters (Ramanathapuram). Parthibanur also belongs to Paramakudi Assembly constituency which is a part of Ramanathapuram (Lok Sabha constituency). Although a small town, and it is located in the centre of the three main towns such as Paramakudi, Manamadurai and Kamuthi.

== Transportation ==
Road The NH 87 passing over the outline of Parthibanur. The state highway pass through this city are SH47 and SH42. The Parthibanur bus stand serving local and inter-district bus transports across the districts of Ramanathapuram, Sivaganga, Madurai and Viruthunagar.

Near by Railway stations are located in Paramakudi and Manamadurai with the distance of 17 km and 13 km respectively.

Madurai international airport is 68 km from the town.

== Geography ==
Parthibanur is located at 9° 36' 00" N,78° 27' 00" E It has an average elevation of 41 metres (134 feet).
