= Sirkazhi division =

Revenue division in Tamil Nadu, India

Sirkazhi division one of two revenue divisions of Mayiladuthurai district, Tamil Nadu, India, comprising the taluks of Sirkali and Tharangambadi taluks. The town Sirkali is the headquarters of Sirkazhi revenue division.

== Urbans in the division ==
1. Sirkazhi Takuk
  1. Puthur
  2. Mathanam
  3. Sirkali or Sirkazhi
  4. Vaitheeswarankoil
  5. Thiruvengadu
2. Tharangambadi Taluk
  1. Melaiyur
  2. Sembanarkoil
  3. Thiruvilaiyattam
  4. Thillaiyadi

The Sirkazhi division comprises a total of 94 revenue villages, and the Tharangambadi division consists of 70 revenue villages.
