= Perungarai =

Konthagan Perungarai Tamil Nadu village

Coordinates: 10°53′N 79°14′E

Perungarai is a small village near Manamadurai Town Paramakudi taluk, Ramanathapuram District, Tamil Nadu, India, Village principle occupation is agriculture. The village surrounding is approximately 2.5 km.1000 people live in the area. Students study at Paramakudi & Ramanathapuram &Parthibanur&Manamadurai & Sivagangai schools and colleges.
