= Paramathi-Velur (disambiguation) =

Paramathi-Velur may refer to:

- Paramathi Velur town
- Paramathi-Velur taluk
- Paramathi-Velur (state assembly constituency)
