= Battle of Negapatam =

Battle of Negapatam may refer one of the third battles between French and British fleets off the coast of Negapatam in India :

- Battle of Negapatam (1746) during the First Carnatic War (part of the War of the Austrian Succession)
- Battle of Negapatam (1758) during the Third Carnatic War (part of the Seven Years' War)
- Battle of Negapatam (1782) during the Anglo-French War of 1778-1783

== See also ==
- Nagapattinam (disambiguation)
