= Vedal, Ranipet =

Vedal
- Village
- Location in Tamil Nadu, India Vedal (India)
- Coordinates: 13°04′49″N 79°35′20″E
- Country: India
- State: Tamil Nadu
- District: Ranipet

Population (2011)
  - Total: 2,781

Languages
  - Official: Tamil
- Time zone: UTC+5:30 (IST)

Vedal is a village in the Arakkonam taluk of Ranipet district in Tamil Nadu, India. In 2011, it had a population of 2,781.

== Demographics ==
Population as of the 2011 census
Category	Population
Male	1,369
Female	1,412
Total	2,781
