= Uralipatti =

- village
- Location in Tamil Nadu, India Uralipatti (India)
- Coordinates: 10°14′40″N 78°16′50″E
- Country: India
- State: Tamil Nadu
- District: Dindigul

Population (2001)
  - Total: 3,662

Languages
  - Official: Tamil
- Time zone: UTC+5:30 (IST)
- PIN: 624402
- Vehicle registration: TN-57
- Coastline: 0 kilometres (0 mi)
- Nearest city: Madurai, Dindigul, Natham
- Sex ratio: 984 ♂/♀
- Literacy: 1871%
- Lok Sabha constituency: Dindigul
- Climate: semi hills area (Köppen)
- Avg. summer temperature: 40 °C (104 °F)
- Avg. winter temperature: 12 °C (54 °F)

Uralipatti is a Panchayat village in Natham taluk, Dindigul district, Tamil Nadu, India. Its population was 3662 in 2001.

== Industry ==
The main income of the village is derived from agriculture; crops such as cotton or rice are commonly grown.

== Demographics ==
As of 2001 India census, Uralipatti had a population of 3662 consisting of 1846 (50.41 %) males and 1816 (49.59%) females. In Uralipatti, 1871 citizens are considered literate (males 59.5%, females 61.46%) with an average literacy rate of 51.09%. This is less than the national average of 59.5%. Demographics indicate that 12.31% of the population is under 6 years of age.

== Culture ==
The Tamil culture is Pandiya's era and the language style is different from other districts. Uralipatti has a Muthalamman Temple which conducts annual rituals that are famous in the village. The festivals during the season include people performing various activities to Amman viz – Pal Kodam, carrying fire pots, etc. In and around Uralipatti there are a considerable number of Muslims. The Christian population is comparatively low. Churches, Masjid are available. All festivals are celebrated well with people of Uralipatti.

== Schools ==
- Panchayat Primary School, Uralipatti, is the oldest school in Natham taluk (More than 100 Years Old).
- Sarva Seva Middle School, Etayampatti
- St. Josephs R.C. Primary School, Appaspuram
- Panchayat Primary School, Erakapatti
- Sarva Seva Primary School, Kathampatti
