= National Highway 179A (India) =

National highway in India

National Highway 179A
- Map of National Highway 179A in red

Route information
- Auxiliary route of NH 79
- Length: 141 km (88 mi)

Major junctions
- South end: Salem
- North end: Vaniyambadi

Location
- Country: India
- States: Tamil Nadu

Highway system
- Roads in India; Expressways; National; State; Asian
← NH 79	→ NH 48

National Highway 179A, commonly referred to as NH 179A, is a national highway in India, which comes under Ministry of Road Transport & Highways, Government of India. It is a secondary route of National Highway 79. NH-179A traverses the state of Tamil Nadu in India.

== Route ==
Salem, Harur, Uthangarai, Thirupathur, Vaniyambadi.

== Junctions ==
NH 79 Terminal near Salem.
NH 179B Terminal near Harur.
NH 77 near Uthangarai.
NH 48 Terminal near Vaniyambadi.

== Project development ==
Four laning of national highway 179A has been taken up along stretch from Harur to Vaniyambadi. Salem to Harur stretch is part of Chennai - Salem greenfield highway project which is also part of Bharatmala Pariyojana scheme. Chennai-Salem Greenfield Corridor under the Bharatmala Pariyojana, a centrally-sponsored and funded road and highways project, is a 277.30 km highway that involves the development of the Tambaram to Harur Section of NH-179B, Harur to Salem Section of NH-179A, Chengalpattu to Kancheepuram Section of NH-132B, Semmampadi to Chetpet Section of NH-179D and Polur to Tiruvannamalai Section of NH-38.

== See also ==
- List of national highways in India
- List of national highways in India by state
