= Arakkonam division =

Arakkonam
- Revenue division
- Arakkonam
- Municipality: Arakkonam
- Taluks: Arakkonam , Nemili

Area
  - Total: 1,050.55 km^{2} (405.62 sq mi)

Population (2011)
  - Total: 514,294

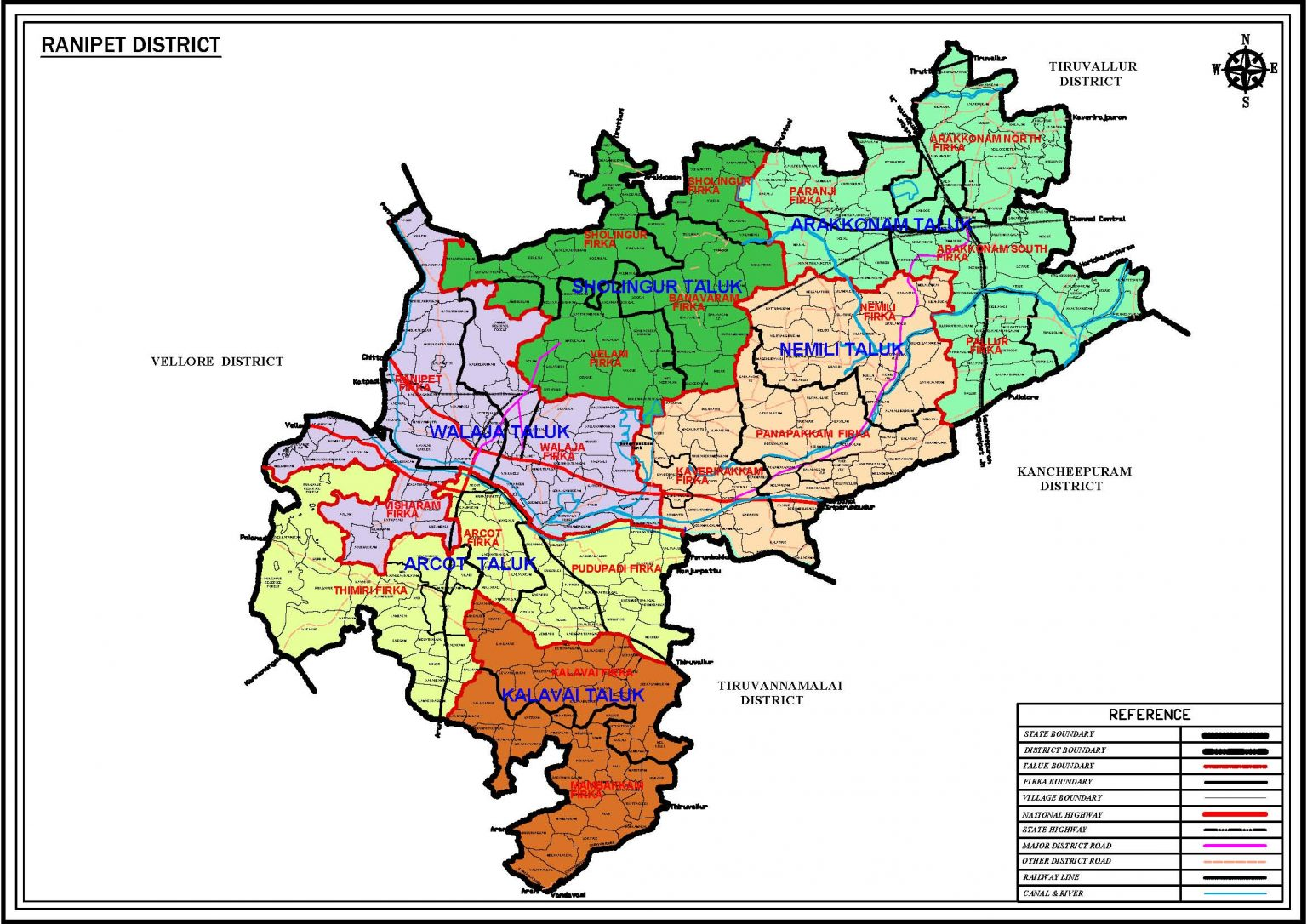

Arakkonam division is a revenue division in the Ranipet district of Tamil Nadu, India. It comprises the taluks of Arakkonam, Nemili. It is a part of Chennai metropolitan area.
