= Administrative divisions of the Madras Presidency =

Province of former British India

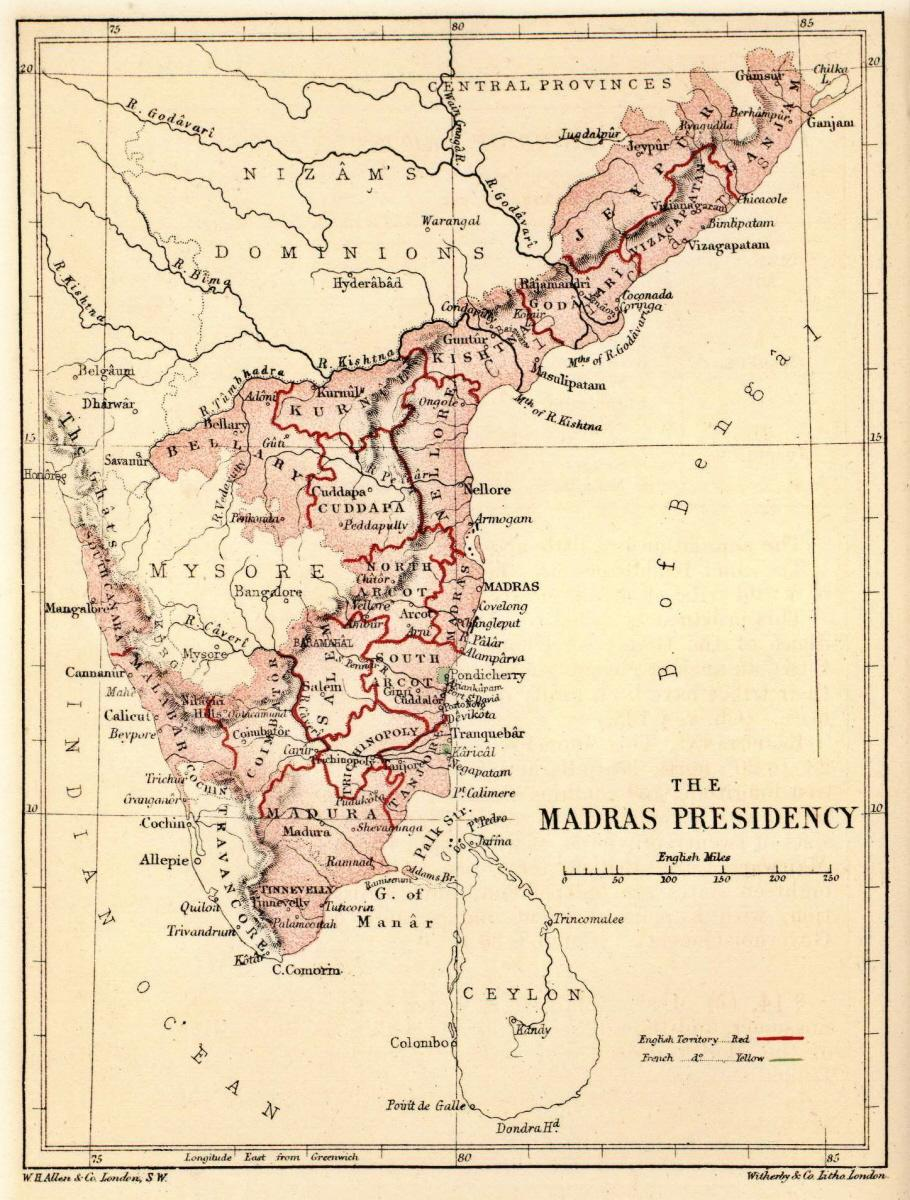
Map of "Madras Presidency" from Pope, G. U. (1880)

The Madras Presidency was a province of British India comprising most of the present day Tamil Nadu and Andhra Pradesh along with a few districts and taluks of Karnataka, Kerala and Odisha. A few princely states, notably Ramnad and Pudukkottai also merged into the Presidency at some or the other time. The Presidency lasted till 1950, when it became the Madras State after India became a republic. In 1953, Telugu-speaking regions of the state split to form Andhra State. Subsequently, in 1956, Kannada- and Malayalam-speaking areas were merged with Mysore and Travancore-Cochin respectively.

== Administrative Zones of the Presidency ==
The Districts of Madras Presidency were divided into five zones:

=== The West Coast ===
The districts of the Presidency along the Arabian Sea constituted the West Coast. They were mainly the coastal districts of present-day Kerala and Karnataka states.

=== The Deccan ===
These were also known as the "Ceded Districts" since they were ceded to the British after the Anglo-Mysore War. The present day district of Bellary in Karnataka and Anantpur, Kadapa and Kurnool districts of Andhra Pradesh came under this zone.

=== The Agencies ===
The mountainous regions of the Eastern Ghats, in present-day Coastal Andhra and Orissa, more specifically the present day Ganjam District and some districts of Andhra like Vizag, were called as Agencies. They were administered as "Tribal Belt" by British (District) Collectors, who were agents to the Governor.

=== Northern Circars ===
This zone included the coastal areas of districts of present-day Coastal Andhra and Ganjam of Orissa.

=== The Coramandel ===
The Southern Division of the Presidency comprising much of modern Tamil Nadu and present-day Chittoor district of Andhra Pradesh was called the Coramandel.

== Districts of the Presidency ==
=== Madras ===
The modern district of Chennai in Tamil Nadu constituted the Madras District. This was one of the earliest areas to be colonized by the British. The present day city of Chennai, then Madras was given as a grant by the Kalahasti Nayak on Francis Day in 1640. Madras was an important battle site during the Carnatic Wars between the English and the French. For a long time, Madras was the administrative capital of the Presidency.

=== Chingleput ===
Chingleput consisted of the modern districts of Chinglepet, Tiruvallur and Conjeevaram. The town of Chinglepet went into British possession in 1763, when the Nawab of Arcot handed it over to solve his debt. The town of Sardas was a Dutch possession till 1819, before it was handed over to the British. The capital of the district was Karunguzhi before it was shifted to Conjeevaram in 1825 to 1835. Again, the capital became Karunguzhi between 1835 and 1859. Later in 1859, the capital was shifted to Saidapet.

=== North Arcot ===
The modern districts of Chittoor in Andhra Pradesh, Vellore, Tirupattur, Ranipet, Thiruvannamalai, Arani and few talukas off Thiruvallur (Thiruttani, pallipattu) in Tamil Nadu constituted the North Arcot District. Chittoor was the administrative headquarters city for the district.

=== South Arcot ===
The modern districts of Villupuram, Kallakurichi and Cuddalore in Tamil Nadu constituted the South Arcot District. Before its possession by the British, it was part of the Carnatic along with North Arcot, Chengalpet and Nellore.

=== Salem ===
The modern districts of Salem, Dharmapuri, Krishnagiri and Namakkal constituted the Salem District. Salem was one of the important districts where industrial development took place, most notably Steel Industries and the TVS Group established in Hosur by T. V. Sundaram Iyengar.Salem is the Administrative headquarters of The District

=== Coimbatore ===
The modern districts of Coimbatore, Erode, Tirupur and a few taluks of Kollegal Taluk of Karnataka constituted the Coimbatore District. Along Salem, Coimbatore was one of the important industrial areas with noted figures like GD Naidu, G. Kuppuswami Naidu and Sri SP Narasimhulu Naidu contributing to the development of the region. Salem and Coimbatore were acquired from the Kingdom of Mysore by the British after the defeat of Dheeran chinnamalai, Tipu Sultan in 1792 and 1799 respectively.

=== Madura ===
The modern districts of Madurai, Theni, Dindigul, Sivaganga, Ramnathapuram, and few taluk of Virudhunagar and formed the Madura district. Along with Tinnively, Madura was acquired after the bloody Polygar Wars between the British and some of the erstwhile chieftains of the Madurai royal family. Most of the Polygars who surrendered or helped the British were appointed as Zamindars in a few villages. The kingdoms of Ramnad and Sivaganga were merged into Madura as Zamindaris in 1803.

=== Tinnively ===
The modern districts of Tirunelveli, Tuticorin Tenkasi along with a few taluks of Virudhunagar formed the Tinnively district. Many battles between Polygars and the British were fought in Tinnively which came to an end in 1801. Among the Prominent Polygars who fought the British was Veerapandiya Kattabomman. The port of Tuticorin was acquired from the Dutch.

=== Trichinopoly ===
The modern districts of Tiruchirapalli, Pudukottai, Karur, Perambalur and Ariyalur formed the Trichinopoly District. The Great Southern Railway Company was established in as Trichinopoly. According to the 1871 census, Trichinoply was the second largest city in the Madras Presidency, after its capital Madras. In 1928 Golden Rock Railway workshop was established in Ponmalai. During World War II Trichinopoly Airport was established as the second airport in Tamil Nadu. In 1938, Tata Airlines carried its first service. Trichinopoly is famous for its branded cigars. The fort of Trichy built by the Nayak kings served as an important garrison in the battle against the French.

=== Tanjore ===
The modern districts of Thanjavur, Nagapattinam, Mayiladuthurai, Tiruvarur and the Aranthangi taluk, Mimisal Karambakudi and someparts of present day Pudukkottai district formed the Tanjore District. After the fall of the Cholas, the Tanjore country came under the Pandyan rule and subsequently the Delhi Sultanate before coming under Vijayanagara. Eventually a Vijayanagara Commander named Sevappa Nayadu was appointed as governor in 1532 and established the Tanjore Nayakar Kingdom which ruled till 1673. In 1674, the area came under the Marathas who ruled till 1855. After the death of the last king, Tanjore came under the British and became a part of the Presidency.

=== Malabar ===
The Malabar district included the present-day districts of Kannur, Kozhikode, Wayanad, Malappuram, Palakkad (excluding Chittur-Thathamangalam in Chittur taluk), and Chavakad Taluk of Thrissur District (former part of Ponnani Taluk) in the northern part of Kerala state.

=== South Canara ===
The South Canara district covered the areas of the present-day districts of Dakshina Kannada and Udupi of Karnataka and the Kasaragod District of Kerala. The district was one of the most heterogeneous of Madras Presidency with Kannada, Tulu, Konkani and Malayalam being the principal languages spoken.

== Bibliography ==
- The Maratha Rajas of Tanjore by K.R. Subramanian, 1928.
