= Mayiladuthurai division =

Mayiladuthurai division is a revenue division of Mayiladuthurai district, Tamil Nadu, India. It comprises the taluks of Kuthalam and Mayiladuthurai.
