= Tiruvarur division =

Tiruvarur division is a revenue division in the Tiruvarur district of Tamil Nadu, India. It comprises the taluks of Kudavasal, Nannilam, Tiruvarur and Valangaiman.
