= Tiruvannamalai division =

Tiruvannamalai division is a revenue division in the Tiruvannamalai district of Tamil Nadu, India. It comprises the taluks of Chengam, Kilpennathur, Thandarampattu and Tiruvannamalai.
