= Tinnevely District (Madras Presidency) =

Subdivision of British India

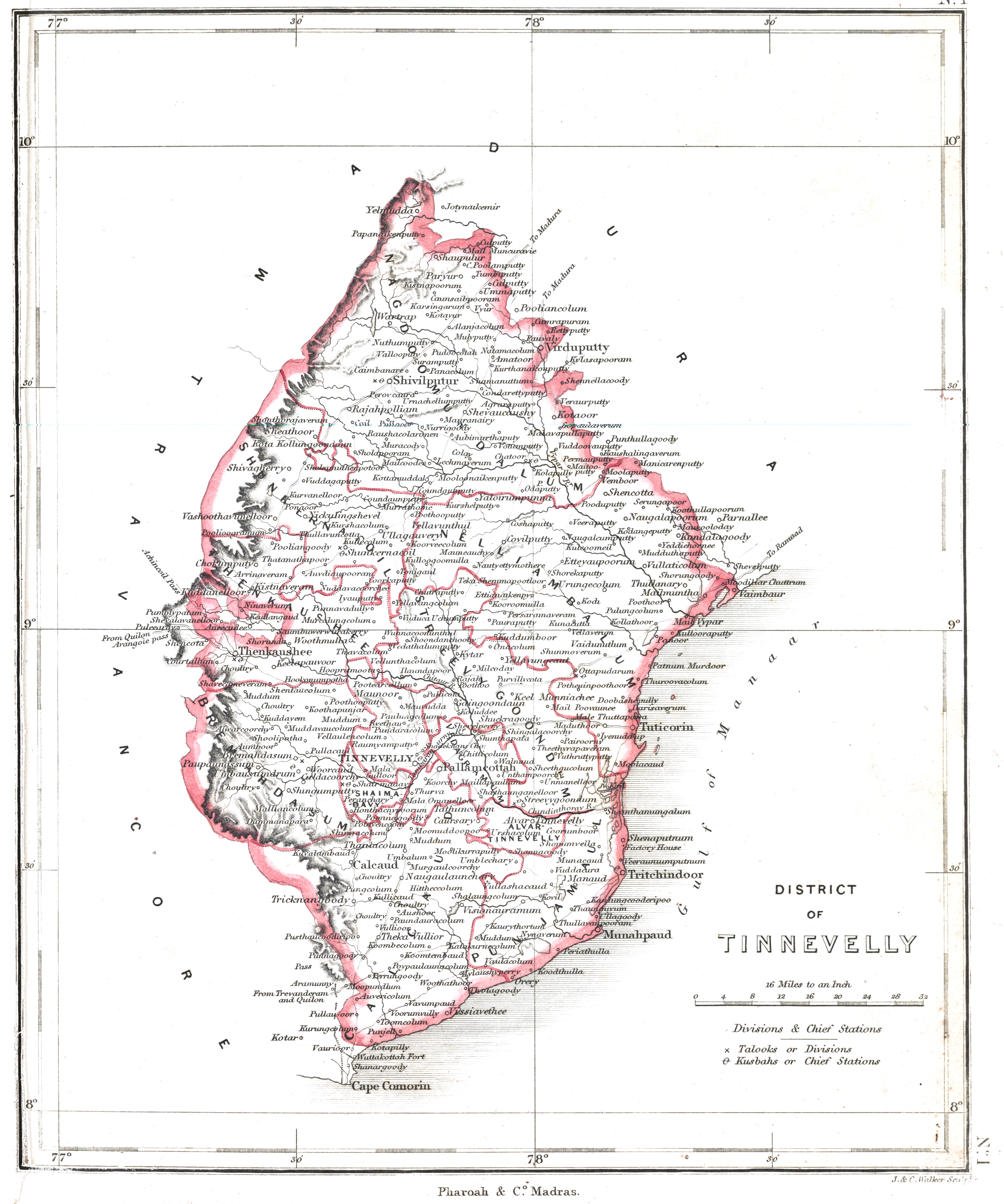
Tinnevely district 1854

Tirunelveli district was one of the districts in the erstwhile Madras Presidency of British India. It covered the area of the present-day districts of Tirunelveli, Thoothukudi, Tenkasi and few parts of Virudhunagar in Tamil Nadu.

== Demographics ==
As of 1901, Tirunelveli had a population of 2,059,607 with a significant number of Muslims and Christians.

== Administration ==
There were four municipalities: Tirunelveli, Srivilliputtur, Tuticorin and Palayamkottai. Headquarters was Palayamkottai..

== Taluks ==
- Ambasamudram (Area:1,250 square kilometres (481 sq mi); Headquarters: Ambasamudram)
- Nanguneri (Area:1,900 square kilometres (730 sq mi); Headquarters: Nanguneri)
- Ottapidaram (Area:2,780 square kilometres (1,072 sq mi); Headquarters: Ottapidaram)
- Sankaranarayanankoil (Area:2,000 square kilometres (770 sq mi); Headquarters: Sankaranarayanankoil)
- Sattur (Area:1,500 square kilometres (560 sq mi); Headquarters: Sattur)
- Srivaikuntam (Area:1,400 square kilometres (542 sq mi); Headquarters: Srivaikuntam)
- Srivilliputtur (Area:1,520 square kilometres (585 sq mi); Headquarters: Srivilliputtur)
- Tenkasi (Area:1,250 square kilometres (481 sq mi); Headquarters: Tenkasi)
- Tirunelveli (Area:850 square kilometres (328 sq mi); Headquarters: Tirunelveli)
