= Srirangam division =

Srirangam Taluk Thiruvarangam
- Urban
- Location in Tamil Nadu, India
- Coordinates: 10.8700°N 78.6800°E
- Country: India
- State: Tamil Nadu
- District: Tiruchirappalli

Population (2011)
  - Total: 210,361

Languages
  - Official: Tamil
- Time zone: UTC+5:30 (IST)
- PIN: 620006
- Vehicle registration: TN 48
- Website: www.trichycorporation.gov.in

Srirangam division is a new revenue division, with Srirangam as its headquarters, became functional in Tiruchirappalli district with Chief Minister Jayalalithaa.

This will be the fourth revenue division in the district after Tiruchi, Lalgudi, and Musiri. The new division will have Srirangam taluk, Manapparai taluk and Marungapuri taluk under its jurisdiction. The Revenue Divisional Office is located at Navalurkottapattu in the outskirts of the city on the Tiruchi-Dindigul National Highway.
