= Natham taluk =

Taluk of Dindigul district, Tamil Nadu, India

Natham taluk is a taluk of Dindigul district of the Indian state of Tamil Nadu. The headquarters of the taluk is the town of Natham.

== Demographics ==
According to the 2011 census, the taluk of Natham had a population of 158,411 with 79,947 males and 78,464 females. There were 981 women for every 1,000 men. The taluk had a literacy rate of 65.51%. Child population in the age group below 6 years were 8,821 Males and 8,478 Females.

== See also ==
- Kokkal
- Uralipatti
