= Kumbakonam division =

Kumbakonam division is a revenue division in the Thanjavur district of Tamil Nadu, India. It comprises the taluks of Kumbakonam, Papanasam, Thiruvidaimarudur and Valangaiman
