= Thanjavur division =

Thanjavur division is a revenue division in the Thanjavur district of Tamil Nadu, India. It comprises the taluks of Orathanadu, Thanjavur, Thiruvaiyaru and Budalur.
