= Kamuthakudi =

- Village
- Location within Tamil Nadu
- Coordinates: 9°57′00″N 78°53′00″E
- Country: India
- State: Tamil Nadu
- District: Ramanathapuram
- Subdistrict: Paramakudi
- Elevation: 41 m (135 ft)
- Time zone: UTC+05:30 (IST)

Kamuthakudi is a village in Paramakudi taluk, Ramanathapuram district, Tamil Nadu in southern India belonging to Paramakudi Taluk. Kamuthakudi also belongs to Paramakudi Assembly constituency which is a part of Ramanathapuram (Lok Sabha constituency).
