= Nagapattinam division =

Revenue division of Nagapattinam district in Tamil Nadu, India

Coordinates: 10.77°N 79.83°E

Nagapattinam division is a revenue division of Nagapattinam district in Tamil Nadu, India. It comprises the taluks of Kilvelur, Nagapattinam, Thirukkuvalai and Vedaranyam.
