= National Highway 532 (India) =

National highway in India

National Highway 532
- Map of National Highway 532 in red

Route information
- Length: 124 km (77 mi)

Major junctions
- From: Cuddalore
- To: Chinnasalem

Location
- Country: India
- States: Tamil Nadu
- Primary destinations: Veppur, Vridhachalam, Neyveli, Vadalur, Kurinjipadi

Highway system
- Roads in India; Expressways; National; State; Asian
| ← NH 332 | → NH 33 |

National Highway 532 (NH 532) is a National Highway in India. It connects Cuddalore and Chinnasalem in Tamil Nadu.
