= Periyakulam division =

Periyakulam division is a revenue division in the Theni district of Tamil Nadu, India.
