= Perambalur division =

Revenue division of Tamil Nadu, India

Coordinates: 11.23°N 78.88°E

Perambalur division is the only revenue division in the Perambalur district of Tamil Nadu, India.
