= Pudukkottai division =

Pudukkottai division is a revenue division in the Pudukkottai district of Tamil Nadu, India.
