= Karur division =

Coordinates: 10.95°N 78.08°E

Karur division is a revenue division in the Karur district of Tamil Nadu, India.
