= Uthamapalayam division =

Coordinates: 9.8°N 77.3333°E

Uthamapalayam division is a revenue division in the Theni district of Tamil Nadu, India.
