= Aranthangi division =

Aranthangi division is a revenue division in the Pudukkottai district of Tamil Nadu, India.
