= Tiruppur division =

Tiruppur division is a revenue division in the state of Tamil Nadu, India.It is The largest Division of Tiruppur district by Population.As per 2011 census The population of Tiruppur division is 15,67,285.The area of Tiruppur division is 1458sqkm.
