= Tindivanam division =

Revenue division in Tamil Nadu, India

Tindivanam division is a revenue division in the Viluppuram district of Tamil Nadu, India.
