= Ilayangudi taluk =

Coordinates: 9.63°N 78.63°E

Ilayangudi taluk is a taluk of Sivagangai district of the Indian state of Tamil Nadu. The headquarters of the taluk is the town of Ilayangudi

== Demographics ==
According to the 2011 census, the taluk of Ilayangudi had a population of 109,160 with 53,953 males and 55,207 females. There were 1023 women for every 1000 men. The taluk had a literacy rate of 70.16. Child population in the age group below 6 was 4,750 Males and 4,810 Females.
