= Kariapatti taluk =

Kariapatti taluk is a taluk of Virudhunagar district of the Indian state of Tamil Nadu. The headquarters of the taluk is the town of Kariapatti.

== Demographics ==
According to the 2011 census, the taluk of Kariapatti had a population of 105,329 with 52,875 males and 52,454 females. There were 992 women for every 1,000 men. The taluk had a literacy rate of 68.46%. Child population in the age group below 6 years were 5,736 Males and 5,513 Females.
