= Devakottai division =

Coordinates: 9°56′31″N 78°49′36″E

Devakottai division is a revenue division in the Sivaganga district of Tamil Nadu, India.
