= Karur taluk =

Coordinates: 10.95°N 78.08°E

Karur taluk is a taluk of Karur district of the Indian state of Tamil Nadu. The headquarters of the taluk is the town of Karur

== Demographics ==
According to the 2011 census, the taluk of Karur had a population of 444,721 with 221,107 males and 223,614 females. There were 1011 women for every 1000 men. The taluk had a literacy rate of 74.55. Child population in the age group below 6 was 19,786 Males and 18,295 Females.
