= Ramanathapuram division =

Revenue division in the Ramanathapuram district

Coordinates: 9.367°N 78.835°E

Ramanathapuram division is a revenue division in the Ramanathapuram district of Tamil Nadu, India.
