= Kulittalai taluk =

Coordinates: 10.56°N 78.25°E

Kulittalai taluk is a taluk of Karur district of the Indian state of Tamil Nadu. The headquarters of the taluk is the town of Kulittalai

== Demographics ==
According to the 2011 census, the taluk of Kulittalai had a population of 206,580 with 101,935 males and 104,645 females. There were 1027 women for every 1000 men. The taluk had a literacy rate of 66.05. Child population in the age group below 6 was 10,826 Males and 10,590 Females.

Kulithalai is second biggest taluk in karur District. Periyyar bridge to connect musiri taluk of Trichirappalli district.
