= Coonoor division =

Revenue division in Tamil Nadu, India

Coonoor division is a revenue division in the Nilgiris District of Tamil Nadu, India. It is the only division of Nilagiri District to have two revenue blocks. According to 2011 census, Coonoor division has a population of 2,65,897 with total area of Coonoor and Kotagiri Taluk.
