= Paramakudi division =

Paramakudi division is a revenue division in the Ramanathapuram district of Tamil Nadu, India.
