= Tirunelveli division =

Tirunelveli division is a revenue division in the Tirunelveli district of Tamil Nadu, India.
