= Pattukkottai division =

Pattukkottai division is a revenue division in the Thanjavur district of Tamil Nadu, India. It comprises the coastal taluks of Pattukkottai and Peravurani.
