= Manamadurai taluk =

Taluk of Tamil Nadu, India

Coordinates: 9.7°N 78.48°E

Manamadurai taluk is a taluk of Sivagangai district of the Indian state of Tamil Nadu. The headquarters of the taluk is the city of Manamadurai

== Demographics ==
According to the 2011 census, the taluk of Manamadurai had a population of 247,268 with 124,447 males and 122,821 females. There were 984 women for every 1000 men. The taluk had a literacy rate of 71.09. Child population in the age group below 6 was 10,734 Males and 10,399 Females.
