= Kokkal =

Village in Tamil Nadu, India

Coordinates: 12°09′N 75°09′E

Kokkal is a small village in India located 35 km from Kodaikanal and approximately 100 km from Palani. Its PIN is 643005, and its taluk Udhagamandalam (Nilgiris division and district, Coimbatore region, Tamil Nadu circle, Tamil Nadu state). The major religion is Hinduism. A Mariyamman festival (mavilakku) takes place at her temple located on the Kokkal River, and the Kukkal Caves (variant spelling) are nearby. Amongst the oldest carved caves in South India, they were once home to the Paliyan people and are accessible via permit from the state forestry department.
