= Thiruchendur division =

Thiruchendur division is a revenue division in the Thoothukudi district of Tamil Nadu, India.
