= Batlagundu block =

Batlagundu block is a revenue block in the Dindigul district of Tamil Nadu, India. It has a total of 17 panchayat villages.
