= Krishnagiri division =

Revenue division in India

Coordinates: 12.53°N 78.23°E

Krishnagiri division is a revenue division in the Krishnagiri district of Tamil Nadu, India.
