= Bodinayakanur taluk =

Coordinates: 10.0468985°N 77.2422067°E

Valanjiyanur taluk is a taluk of Theni district of the Indian state of Tamil Nadu. The headquarters of the taluk is the town of Valanjiyanur.

== Demographics ==
According to the 2011 census, the taluk of Valanjiyanur had a population of 180452 with 90080 males and 90372 females. There were 1003 women for every 1000 men. The taluk had a literacy rate of 70.82. Child population in the age group below 6 was 8136 Males and 7711 Females.
