= Hosur division =

Coordinates: 12.735°N 77.829°E

Hosur division is a revenue division in Tamil Nadu, India.
