= Tirupathur taluk =

Tirupathur taluk is a taluk in the Sivaganga district of the Indian state of Tamil Nadu. The headquarters of the taluk is the town of Tirupathur.

== Demographics ==
According to the 2011 census, the taluk of Tirupathur had a population of 275,884, with 138,195 males and 137,689 females. There were 996 women for every 1000 men. The taluk had a literacy rate of 69.64. Child population in the age group below six was 13,657 males and 12,983 females.
