= Sivakasi division =

Sivakasi division is a revenue division in the Virudhunagar district of Tamil Nadu, India.
