= Cheranmahadevi division =

Revenue division in Tamil Nadu, India

Cheranmahadevi division is a revenue division in the Tirunelveli district of Tamil Nadu, India.
