= Sivaganga division =

Sivaganga division is a revenue division in the Sivaganga district of Tamil Nadu, India.
