= Kulittalai division =

Coordinates: 10.56°N 78.25°E

Kulittalai division is a revenue division in the Karur district of Tamil Nadu, India.
