= Mannargudi division =

Coordinates: 10.663°N 79.445°E

Mannargudi division is a revenue division in the Tiruvarur district of Tamil Nadu, India. It comprises the taluks of Mannargudi, Needamangalam and Thiruthiraipoondi. The Mannargudi Railway Station is in this revenue division.
