= Tiruchuli taluk =

Tiruchuli taluk is a taluk of Virudhunagar district of the Indian state of Tamil Nadu. The headquarters of the taluk is the town of Tiruchuli.

== Demographics ==
According to the 2011 census, the taluk of Tiruchuli had a population of 103,068 with 51,886 males and 51,182 females. There were 986 women for every 1,000 men. The taluk had a literacy rate of 67.57%. Child population in the age group below 6 years were 5,406 Males and 5,081 Females.
