= Gudalur Janmam Estates (Abolition and Conversion into Ryotwari) Act, 1969 =

Act of Tamil Nadu state, India

The Gudalur Janmam Estates (Abolition and Conversion into Ryotwari) Act, 1969 was an act aiming at vesting of agricultural land to the cultivators, and was specially created for the Gudalur Taluk of Nilgiris District in Tamil Nadu State in India. The Act was passed by the Tamil Nadu State Legislature as Act 24/1969.

It was also included in the ninth schedule of the Constitution. Section 3 of the Act was for vesting the private forest with the State Government and this provision was struck down by the Court as unconstitutional. To overcome the Court Judgment, this Act was placed in the 9th Schedule of the Constitution of India. A Bench of Supreme Court held that the purpose of the Act, enacted by the Tamil Nadu government, was meant to do away with hereditaryship.

On 11 January 2007, the Supreme Court in I R Coelho vs state of Tamil nadu 2007 (2) SCC 70, with the 9 judge bench struck down the protection enjoyed by legislations which were included in the Schedule IX of the constitution. As a result of this judgement is open for challenge by a citizen for violation of fundamental rights guaranteed by part III of the constitution.

== Act ==
This act is placed in the Ninth Schedule of the Constitution of India as entry number 80. Therefore, it is exempt from constitutional challenge on civil right grounds.

== See also ==
- Tamil Nadu Government Laws & Rules
