= Killiyoor taluk =

Killiyoor taluk is one of the six taluks in Kanyakumari district. The taluk was established as a result of the bifurcation of the erstwhile Vilavancode taluk.

== History ==
Historically, the region encompassing Killiyoor taluk was an integral part of the larger Vilavancode taluk. Vilavancode taluk itself has a rich history, having been a significant administrative division within the erstwhile Travancore Kingdom and subsequently the Travancore-Cochin State. In 1956, with the States Reorganisation Act, Vilavancode, along with Thovalai, Kalkulam, and Agastheeswaram Taluks of the then Thiruvananthapuram District, were transferred from Travancore-Cochin State to the then Madras State (later renamed as Tamil Nadu) to form the Kanyakumari District.
