= Valangaiman =

Valangaiman Valangiman
- town panchayat
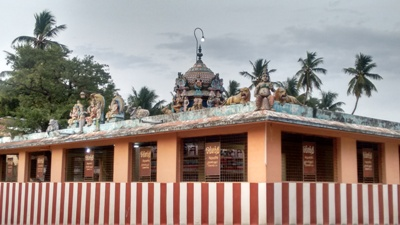
- Valangaiman Mariamman Temple
- Nickname: Valangai
- Location in Tamil Nadu, India
- Coordinates: 10.756866°N 79.370662°E
- Country: India
- State: Tamil Nadu
- District: Thiruvarur
- Taluk: Valangaiman
- Assembly constituency: Nannilam
- Elevation: 17 m (56 ft)

Population
  - Total: 11,754

Languages
  - Official: Tamil
- Time zone: UTC+5:30 (IST)
- PIN: 612804
- +91: 04374
- Vehicle registration: TN-68

Valangaiman (also spelt as Valangiman) is a town Panchayat in the Valangaiman taluk of Thiruvarur district in the Indian state of Tamil Nadu. It is the headquarters of Valangaiman Taluk.

== Geography ==
Valangiman has an elevation of 500 m (1,600 ft). It is situated about 31 kilometres northwest of the district seat of Tiruvarur and 10 kilometres south of Kumbakonam. It is about 40 kilometers east of Thanjavur, 27 kilometers north of mannarkudi and 30 km west of Thiruvarur.

== Demographics ==
In the 2011 India census, Valangaiman had a population of 11,754. Males constituted 49% of the population and females 51%. Valangaiman had an average literacy rate of 68%, higher than the national average of 59.5%: male literacy was 73%, and female literacy was 63%. In 2001 in Valangaiman, 10% of the population was under 6 years of age.

== Education ==
Govt. Polytechnic College Valangaiman, 300 students per year 60 per branch are admitted every year.

== Politics ==
Valangaiman belongs to Nannilam assembly constituency. Food minister Kamaraj is the current Mla for Nannilam assembly constituency until 2026. Food minister Kamaraj is the Mla for Nannilam assembly constituency. Nannilam is part of Nagapattinam. Valangaiman belongs to Thiruvarur district Tamil Nadu (Lok Sabha constituency). There are 102 streets in Valangaiman town. Valangaiman town panchayat has 15 wards. Pungancheri and Valayamapuram and Layam are part of Valangaiman town panchayat.
