= Kovilpatti division =

Revenue division in India

Kovilpatti division is a revenue division in the Thoothukudi district of Tamil Nadu, India.
