= Mettur division =

Coordinates: 11.80°N 77.80°E

Mettur division is a revenue division in the Salem district of Tamil Nadu, India.
