= Manamelkudi =

Town in India

Coordinates: 10°03′N 79°14′E

Manamelkudi is a coastal town in Pudukkottai district, Tamil Nadu, India. It is located in the southeast of the district, on the Palk Strait coast. State Highway 200 runs through the town, which is the headquarters and namesake of Manamelkudi taluk. The town, which is spread over 1135 hectares, had a population of 7,033 in 2011, resulting in an average population density of 619.6/km^{2} (1,604.9/sq mi).
