= Thoothukudi division =

Thoothukudi division is a revenue division in the Thoothukudi district of Tamil Nadu, India.
