= RK Pet taluk =

Taluk of Tiruvallur district of the Indian state of Tamil Nadu

RK Pet taluk is a taluk of Tiruvallur district of the Indian state of Tamil Nadu. The headquarters of the taluk is the town of RK Pet. It was created by bifurcation of Pallipattu taluk.
