= Avadaiyarkoil taluk =

Indian taluk in Tamil Nadu

Coordinates: 10°4′21″N 79°2′21″E

Avadaiyarkoil taluk is a taluk of Pudukkottai district of the Indian state of Tamil Nadu. The headquarters of the taluk is the town of Avadaiyarkoil.

== Demographics ==
According to the 2011 census, the taluk of Avadaiyarkoil had a population of 87306 with 43866 males and 43440 females. There were 990 women for every 1000 men. The taluk had a literacy rate of 71.4. Child population in the age group below 6 was 4453 Males and 4359 Females.
