= Devakottai taluk =

Taluk of Sivagangai district in Tamil Nadu, India

Coordinates: 9°56′31″N 78°49′36″E

Devakottai taluk is a taluk of Sivagangai district of the Indian state of Tamil Nadu. The headquarters of the taluk is the town of Devakottai

== Demographics ==
According to the 2011 census, the taluk of Devakottai had a population of 157,328 with 79,545 males and 77,783 females. There were 978 women for every 1000 men. The taluk had a literacy rate of 75.65. Child population in the age group below 6 was 6,933 Males and 6,646 Females.
