= Manapparai taluk =

Coordinates: 10.60759°N 78.414874°E

Manapparai taluk is a taluk of Tiruchirapalli district of the Indian state of Tamil Nadu. The headquarters of the taluk is the town of Manapparai.

== Demographics ==
According to the 2011 census, the taluk of Manapparai had a population of 370,482 with 184,674 males and 185,808 females. There were 1006 women for every 1000 men. The taluk had a literacy rate of 66.4. Child population in the age group below 6 was 20,397 Males and 19,428 Females.
