= Tharangambadi taluk =

Administrative division in Tamil Nadu, India

Tharangambadi taluk is a taluk of Mayiladuthurai district of the Indian state of Tamil Nadu. The headquarters of the taluk is the town of Porayar

== Demographics ==
According to the 2011 census, the taluk of Tharangambadi had a population of 206,752 with 101,537 males and 105,215 females. There were 1036 women for every 1000 men. The taluk had a literacy rate of 76. Child population in the age group below 6 was 10,367 Males and 9,902 Females.
