= Rajapalaiyam taluk =

Coordinates: 9°27′0″N 77°33′0″E

Rajapalayam taluk is a taluk of Virudhunagar district of the Indian state of Tamil Nadu. The headquarters of the taluk is the town of Rajapalaiyam.

== Demographics ==
According to the 2011 census, the taluk of Rajapalaiyam had a population of 347,318 with 173,202 males and 174,116 females. There were 1,005 women for every 1,000 men. The taluk had a literacy rate of 74.84%. Child population in the age group below 6 years were 15,736 Males and 14,890 Females.
