= Chinnasalem taluk =

Taluk in Kallakurichi district, Tamil Nadu, India

Coordinates: 11.649546°N 78.859863°E

Chinnasalem Taluk is a taluk located in the Kallakurichi district of the Indian state of Tamil Nadu. The headquarters is the town of Chinnasalem. It is located 16 km towards west from District headquarters Kallakurichi. 254 km from State capital Chennai towards North. Chinnasalem taluk comes under multiple assembly constituencies. There are two assembly constituencies in Chinnasalem taluk, namely Sankarapuram and Kallakurichi.

== Revenue villages ==
There are 85 revenue villages under the Chinnasalem Taluk.

== Pin codes of Chinnasalem Taluk ==
- 606301 ( Nainarpalayam )
- 606201 ( Chinnasalem )
- 606207 ( Vadakkanandal )
