= Theni taluk =

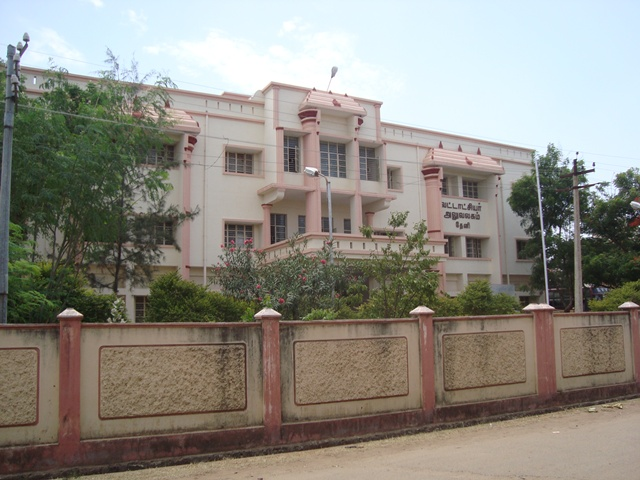
Theni Taluk office

Theni taluk is a taluk of Theni district of the Indian state of Tamil Nadu. The headquarters of the taluk is the town of Theni.

== Demographics ==
According to the 2011 census, the taluk of Theni had a population of 199,921 with 100,313 males and 99,608 females. There were 993 women for every 1,000 men. The taluk had a literacy rate of 75.2%. Child population in the age group below 6 years were 9,343 Males and 8,880 Females.
