= Srivilliputhur taluk =

Srivilliputhur taluk is a taluk of Virudhunagar district of the Indian state of Tamil Nadu. The headquarters of the taluk is the town of Srivilliputhur.

== Demographics ==
According to the 2011 census, the taluk of Srivilliputhur had a population of 292,895 with 145,763 males and 147,132 females. There were 1,009 women for every 1,000 men. The taluk had a literacy rate of 70.41%. Child population in the age group below 6 years were 13,150 Males and 12,615 Females.
