= Manamelkudi taluk =

Manamelkudi taluk is a taluk of Pudukkottai district of the Indian state of Tamil Nadu. The headquarters of the taluk is the town of Manamelkudi.

== Demographics ==
According to the 2011 census, the taluk of Manamelkudi had a population of 86,589 with 42,945 males and 43,644 females. There were 1016 women for every 1000 men. The taluk had a literacy rate of 74.79. Child population in the age group below 6 was 4,484 males and 4,397 females.

== Rain Fall ==
The town gets major rainfall during the North east monsoon period. The annual normal rainfall varies from 300 mm to 800 mm.

== Schools and colleges ==
Schools & colleges are located in this town. Half of the pupils get their education from government and government aided schools. But still, some well developed and equipped private schools (both Matric and CBSE syllabus) are also providing education in and around the town. The town also has engineering, arts & science, laws, hotel management colleges in its surrounding. It has a government polytechnic college, which is a top ranking one among Tamil Nadu's polytechnic colleges. Higher Secondary School = Manamelkudi, Kattumavadi Ammapattinam Vichoor, Kottaipattinam.

== Hospitals ==
- Government hospital is located on the Sethu road (East Coast Road) and private hospitals are available.
- Government hospital ammapattinam
- Singavanam has separate Govt. Hospitals.
- Sree Maadhavi hospital is located on the EC Road
- Sree Vijay Hospitals located on the Sethu roadIt is one of the ortho hospital in the area
- Kalimuthu Hospital

== Politics ==
manamelkudi taluk is come to Aranthangi State Assembly constitutions Aranthangi MLAs from 1952

1. 1952-1957 - M.Pandidurai (DMK)
2. 1957-1962 - M.Kalander Maideen.B.E (DMK)
3. 1962-1971 - DuraiArasan A (DMK)
4. 1971-1974 - Ramanathan Udayar (DMK)
5. 1977-1999 - Thirunavukarasar (AIADMK, MGR Kalagam)
6. 1999-2001 - Anbarasu (MGR Kalagam)
7. 2001-2006 - Arasan.P (MGR Kalagam)
8. 2006-2011 - Udhayam Shanmugam (DMK)
9. 2011-2016 - M.Rajanayagam (AIADMK)
10. 2016-2021 - Rathinasabhapathy E (AIADMK)
11. 2021 - Onwards - Ramachandran T (INC)
