= Chengam taluk =

Coordinates: 12.3°N 78.8°E

Chengam taluk is a taluk of Tiruvannamalai district of the Indian state of Tamil Nadu. The headquarters is the town of Chengam.

== Demographics ==
According to the 2011 census, the taluk of Chengam had a population of 280581 with 142089 males and 138492 females. There were 975 women for every 1000 men. The taluk had a literacy rate of 61.3. Child population in the age group below 6 was 17210 Males and 15479 Females.
