= Aruppukkottai taluk =

Coordinates: 9.51°N 78.1°E

Aruppukkottai taluk is a taluk of Virudhunagar district of the Indian state of Tamil Nadu. The headquarters of the taluk is the town of Aruppukkottai.

== Demographics ==
According to the 2011 census, the taluk of Aruppukkottai had a population of 248,186 with 123,337 males and 124,849 females. There were 1,012 women for every 1,000 men. The taluk had a literacy rate of 77.3%. Child population in the age group below 6 years were 11,668 Males and 11,087 Females.
