= Dindigul taluk =

Asanathupurammap

Coordinates: 10.35°N 77.95°E

Dindigul taluk is a taluk of Dindigul district of the Indian state of Tamil Nadu. The headquarters of the taluk is the town of Dindigul.

== Demographics ==
According to the 2011 census, the taluk of Dindigul had a population of 643,212 with 320,984 males and 322,228 females. There were 1,004 women for every 1,000 men. The taluk had a literacy rate of 73.19%. Child population in the age group below 6 years were 31,282 Males and 29,777 Females.
