= Ponnamaravathi taluk =

Human settlement in India

Ponnamaravathi taluk is a taluk of Pudukkottai district of the Indian state of Tamil Nadu. The headquarters is the town of Ponnamaravathi.

== Demographics ==
According to the 2011 census, the taluk of Ponnamaravathi had a population of 108,579 with 53,831 males and 54,748 females. There were 1,017 women for every 1,000 men. The taluk had a literacy rate of 67.23. Child population in the age group below 6 was 5,542 Males and 5,258 Females.
