= Arakkonam taluk =

Taluk in Tamil Nadu, India

Arakkonam
- Taluk
- Arakkonam
- Interactive map of Arakkonam
- Coordinates: 13°04′40″N 79°40′00″E
- Country: India
- State: Tamil Nadu
- District: Ranipet

Area
  - Total: 480.18 km^{2} (185.40 sq mi)

Population (2011)
  - Total: 300,899
  - Density: 626.64/km^{2} (1,623.0/sq mi)

Arakkonam Taluk is a taluk in Ranipet District of the Indian state of Tamil Nadu. The headquarters of the taluk is the town of Arakkonam. Some parts of the taluk including Arakkonam town falls under the jurisdiction of the Greater Chennai Metropolitan Area. One village in the taluk is Vedal.

== Demographics ==
According to the 2011 census, the taluk of Arakkonam had a population of 300899.
