= Thirumayam taluk =

Thirumayam taluk is a taluk of Pudukkottai district of the Indian state of Tamil Nadu. The headquarters of the taluk is the town of Thirumayam

== Demographics ==
According to the 2011 census, the taluk of Thirumayam had a population of 158,860 with 79,049 males and 79,811 females. There were 1,010 women for every 1,000 men. The taluk had a literacy rate of 68.3%. Child population in the age group below 6 was 7,983 Males and 7,770 Females.
