= Sivaganga taluk =

Sivaganga taluk is a taluk of Sivagangai district of the Indian state of Tamil Nadu. The headquarters of the taluk is the town of Sivaganga.

There are 5 revenue circles and 67 revenue villages under this taluk.

== Demographics ==
According to the 2011 census, the taluk of Sivaganga had a population of 288,674 with 142,979 males and 145,695 females, with 74,167 families total. For the total population there were 1,019 females for every 1,000 males, and for children under 7 there were 949 females for every 1,000 males. The population below 7 years of age were 15,523 males and 14,730 females.

Around 16% of the total population, or 46,263 people including 4,444 under 7 years, lived in urban areas while the remaining 84% (242,411 people including 25,809 under 7 years) lived in rural areas.

The taluk had a literacy rate of 79.06%.

Religious Distribution
Religion	Total	Percentage	Male	Female
Hindu	258,908	89.69%	128,457	130,451
Christian	21,580	7.48%	10,466	11,114
Muslim	7,770	2.69%	3,863	3,907
Sikh	35	0.01%	20	15
Buddhist	21	0.01%	13	8
Jain	8	<0.01%	2	6
Other	8	<0.01%	3	5
None Specified	344	0.12%	155	189

Working Population
Job	Total	Male	Female
Main Work (Note: Employment/Earning for more than 6 months)	103,663	65,681	37,982
Agriculture Laborer	35,920	18,293	17,627
Cultivators	27,989	17,737	10,252
Household Industries	1,505	837	668
Other Workers	38,249	28,814	9,435
Marginal Workers (Note: Employment/Earning for less than 6 months)	32,581	16,658	15,923
Non-Working	152,430	60,640	91,790
