= Thirukkuvalai taluk =

Thirukkuvalai taluk is a taluk in the Nagapattinam district of the Indian state of Tamil Nadu. The headquarters is the town of Thirukkuvalai.

== Demographics ==
According to the 2011 census, the taluk of Thirukkuvalai had a population of 60,753 with 30,078 males and 30,675 females. There were 1020 women for every 1000 men. The taluk had a literacy rate of 71.82. Child population in the age group below 6 was 2,765 Males and 2,713 Females.
