= Aranthangi taluk =

Coordinates: 10.1631°N 78.9962°E

Ara(m)nthangi taluk is a taluk of Pudukkottai district of the Indian state of Tamil Nadu. The headquarters of the taluk is the town of Aranthangi

== Demographics ==
According to the 2011 census, the taluk of Aranthangi had a population of 195798 with 95235 males and 100563 females. There were 1056 women for every 1000 men. The taluk had a literacy rate of 72.86. Child population in the age group below 6 was 10609 Males and 10101 Females.
