= Gudalur division =

Revenue division in Tamil Nadu, India

Coordinates: 11.50°N 76.50°E

Gudalur division is a revenue division in the Nilgiris district of Tamil Nadu, India. It is one of the three revenue divisions of Nilgiris District, and includes two talukas, Gudalur and Pandhalur. According to the 2011 census Gudalur Revenue division had an estimated population of 2,32,213.

Gudalur revenue division covers western parts of Nilgiris District, with an altitude of 934 to 1124 meters above sea level. It has an Rto office in Thorappalli the only one in the Nilagiri District after Ooty.
