= Paramathi-Velur taluk =

Taluk in Tamil Nadu, India

Paramathi-Velur taluk is a taluk in the Namakkal district of the Indian state of Tamil Nadu. Paramathi Velur town is the headquarter of this Taluk.

The longest road in INDIA is NH-7 which also passes through paramathi velur. paramathi is mainly known for paramathi fort. Fort was very ancient and traditional indication. The only fort built by tamilans without rocks . That was built by allala ilayan belongs to vettuva gounder community. Inside the fort there is a temple for the guardian of the fort called kotaiyanna swamy.

== History ==
The Kolli Hills are featured in several works of classical Tamil literature such as Silappathigaram, Manimekalai, Purananuru and Ainkurnuru. The region was ruled by Valvil Ori around 200 AD, who is praised as one of the seven great philanthropists of ancient Tamil Nadu. His valor and marksmanship are sung by several poets, and his exploits are a popular part of folklore. Ori is said to have killed a lion, bear, deer and a boar with a single arrow.

== Geography ==
The jackfruit grown on these mountains is known for its taste and fragrance and is often soaked in wild honey that is also harvested from these mountains. The mountains are covered by lush green vegetation in the spring and monsoon, and are streaked with streams. There are three reserved forests that are controlled by the Government of Tamil Nadu, namely Ariyur Solai, Kundur Nadu, Pulianjolai It is not correct to regard the name Kolli Hills as being due to the incidence of deadly diseases such as malaria! It is because early literature records the existence of an image called kollippavai on top of these hills. This image was believed to represent the spirit of a maiden who lured wayfarers by her beauty and then killed them. The mountain is a site of pilgrimage, because of the Arapaleeswarar Temple, which is believed to have a secret path to the Shiva temple in Rasipuram. This Shiva temple is said to have been built by Valvil Ori in the 1st or 2nd century when he ruled this area. "Arappaleeswara sathakam" is the poem which praises the Lord Arappaleeswarar. It is believed that this temple existed during the Sangam period itself.

== Demographics ==
According to the 2011 census, the taluk of Paramathi-Velur had a population of 210,148 with 105,097 males and 105,051 females. There were 1000 women for every 1000 men. The taluk had a literacy rate of 68.46. Child population in the age group below 6 was 8,258 Males and 7,543 Females.

== Colleges ==
Kandaswmy Kandars Arts College (One of the early colleges in Tamil Nadu outside Chennai)

- Selvamm Arts and Science College, Papinayakkanpatti, Namakkal.
- K. S. Rangasamy College of Technology, Tiruchengode.
- Sengunthar College of Engineering, Tiruchengode.
- Sengunthar Arts & Science College, Tiruchengode.
- K.S.R college of engineering, Tiruchengode.
- C.M.S Educational Trust
- J.K.K.Nattraja College of Engineering & Technology, Komarapalayam
- Annai Mathammal Sheela Engineering College, Namakkal
- P.G.P. College of Arts and Science, Namakkal
- P.G.P. College of Engineering and Technology, Namakkal
- Paavai Engineering College, Namakkal
- Vivekanadha College of Engineering for Women, Elyampalayam
- Vivekananda College of Arts and Sciences, Elyampalayam
- The Spectrum Academy, Namakkal

== Schools ==
- Kandasami Kandar Matriculation Higher Secondary School, Velur
- Government Higher Secondary School, Palappatti
- P.U.E. School, Chinna Karasapalayam
- Malar Matriculation Higher Secondary School, Paramathi
- The Green Park Higher Secondary School, Namakkal
- Sun Star Higher Secondary School, Jedarpalayam
- Kongu Matriculation Higher Secondary School, Velur.
- Government boys Higher Secondary School, paramathi.
- Kandasamy kandar boys higher secondary school, Velur
- Kandasamy kandar girls higher secondary school, Velur
- Kandasamy Kandar Elementary school, Velur
- Vivekananda matriculation higher secondary school, Pandamangalam
- Malar matriculation higher secondary school, Paramathi
- R.N.Oxford matriculation school, Paundamangalam

== Tourism ==
Kolli Hills has to be explored in a leisure space. Kolli Hills has been the top choice for nature lovers, hiking enthusiasts, trekking clubs and meditation practitioners among hill stations in Tamil Nadu. In comparison to other hill stations in Tamil Nadu, Kolli Hills is not commercialized, less polluted and offers unique mountain ranges.

Activities for the Kolli Hills:

- Trekking
- Nature Walk
- Rock Climbing
- Rappelling
- Bird watching
- cave exploration
- star gazing
- Camp fire
- Botanical garden
- Watching local folklore/Folk dance with campfire.
