= Thiruvaiyaru Taluk =

Thiruvaiyaru taluk is a taluk in the Thanjavur district of Tamil Nadu, India. The headquarters is the town of Thiruvaiyaru.

== Demographics ==
According to the 2011 census, the taluk of Thiruvaiyaru had a population of 185,737 with 91,789 males and 93,948 females. There were 1024 women for every 1000 men. The taluk had a literacy rate of 76.32. Child population in the age group below 6 was 8,848 Males and 8,569 Females.
