= Chinnasalem =

- Special Grade Town Panchayat
- Chinna salem
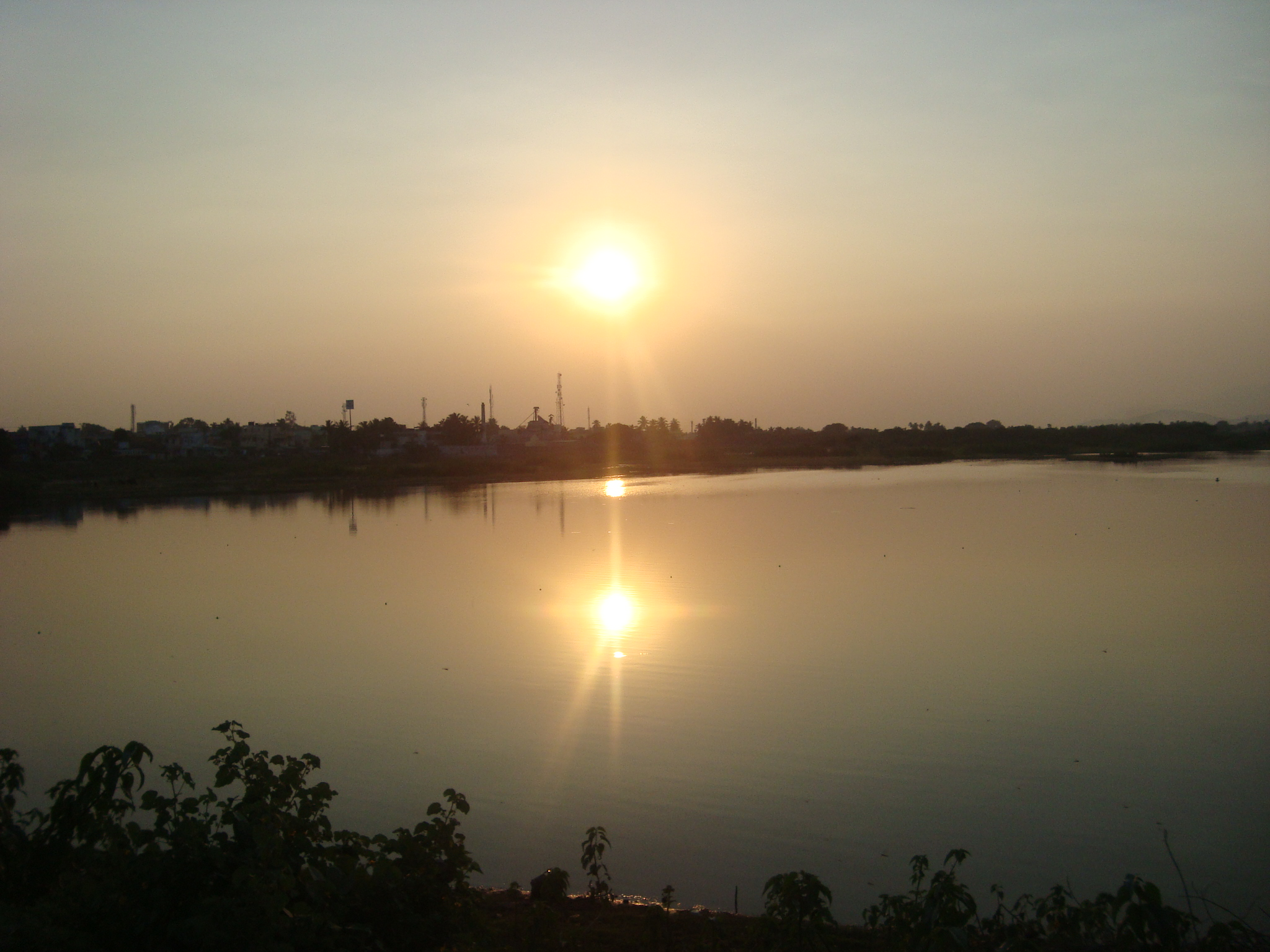
- Sunset on chinnasalem lake,

- Location in Tamil Nadu, India
- Coordinates: 11.649546°N 78.859863°E
- Country: India
- State: Tamil Nadu
- District: Kallakurichi

Area
  - Total: 13.60 km^{2} (5.25 sq mi)

Population (2011)
  - Total: 25,106
  - Density: 1,435.2205/km^{2} (3,717.204/sq mi)

Languages
  - Official: Tamil
- Time zone: UTC+5:30 (IST)
- PIN: 606201
- Telephone code: 04151
- Vehicle registration: TN-15

Chinnasalem is a Special Grade Town Panchayat in Kallakurichi district in the state of Tamil Nadu, India. It is also the headquarters of Chinnasalem Taluk.

== Demographics ==
As of 2001 India census, Chinnasalem had a population of 19519. Males constitute 50% of the population and females 50%. Chinnasalem has an average literacy rate of 75%, higher than the national average of 50.5%; with male literacy of 78% and female literacy of 50%. 11% of the population is under 6 years of age.
