= Udayarpalayam division =

Revenue division of Tamil Nadu, India

Coordinates: 11°10′58″N 79°16′32″E

Udayarpalayam division is a revenue division in the Ariyalur district of Tamil Nadu, India.
