= Kovilpatti taluk =

Coordinates: 9.17°N 77.87°E

Kovilpatti taluk is a taluk of Thoothukudi district of the Indian state of Tamil Nadu. The headquarters of the taluk is the town of Kovilpatti.

== Demographics ==
According to the 2011 census, the taluk of Kovilpatti had a population of 312,825 with 153,425 males and 159,400 females. There were 1039 women for every 1000 men. The taluk had a literacy rate of 74.59%. Child population in the age group below 6 years were 13,741 Males and 13,592 Females.
