= Nagapattinam taluk =

Coordinates: 10.77°N 79.83°E

Nagapattinam taluk is a taluk of Nagapattinam district of the Indian state of Tamil Nadu. The headquarters of the taluk is the town of Nagapattinam

== Demographics ==
According to the 2011 census, the taluk of Nagapattinam had a population of 282,872 with 140,027 males and 142,845 females. There were 1,020 women for every 1,000 men. The taluk had a literacy rate of 77.13%. Child population in the age group below 6 years were 15,333 Males and 14,567 Females.
