= Sattur taluk =

Sattur is a taluk of Virudhunagar district of the Indian state of Tamil Nadu. The headquarters of the taluk is the town of Sattur.

== Demographics ==
According to the 2011 census, the taluk of Sattur had a population of 168,659 with 83,113 males and 85,546 females. There were 1,029 women for every 1,000 men. The taluk had a literacy rate of 71.41%. Child population in the age group below 6 years were 8,145 Males and 7,787 Females.
