= Kodaikanal taluk =

Coordinates: 10.23°N 77.48°E

Kodaikanal taluk is a taluk of Dindigul district of the Indian state of Tamil Nadu. The headquarters of the taluk is the town of Kodaikanal.

== Demographics ==
According to the 2011 census, the taluk of Kodaikanal had a population of 114,999 with 57,853 males and 57,146 females. There were 988 women for every 1000 men. The taluk had a literacy rate of 72.44. Child population in the age group below 6 was 5,644 males and 5,505 females.
