= Sirkazhi taluk =

Sirkazhi taluk is a taluk of Mayiladuthurai district of the Indian state of Tamil Nadu. The headquarters of the taluk is the town of Sirkazhi

== Demographics ==
According to the 2011 census, the taluk of Sirkazhi had a population of 318,875 with 157,621 males and 161,254 females. There were 1023 women for every 1000 men. The taluk had a literacy rate of 73.67. Child population in the age group below 6 was 15,995 Males and 15,185 Females.
