= Valangaiman Taluk =

Coordinates: 10.756866°N 79.370662°E

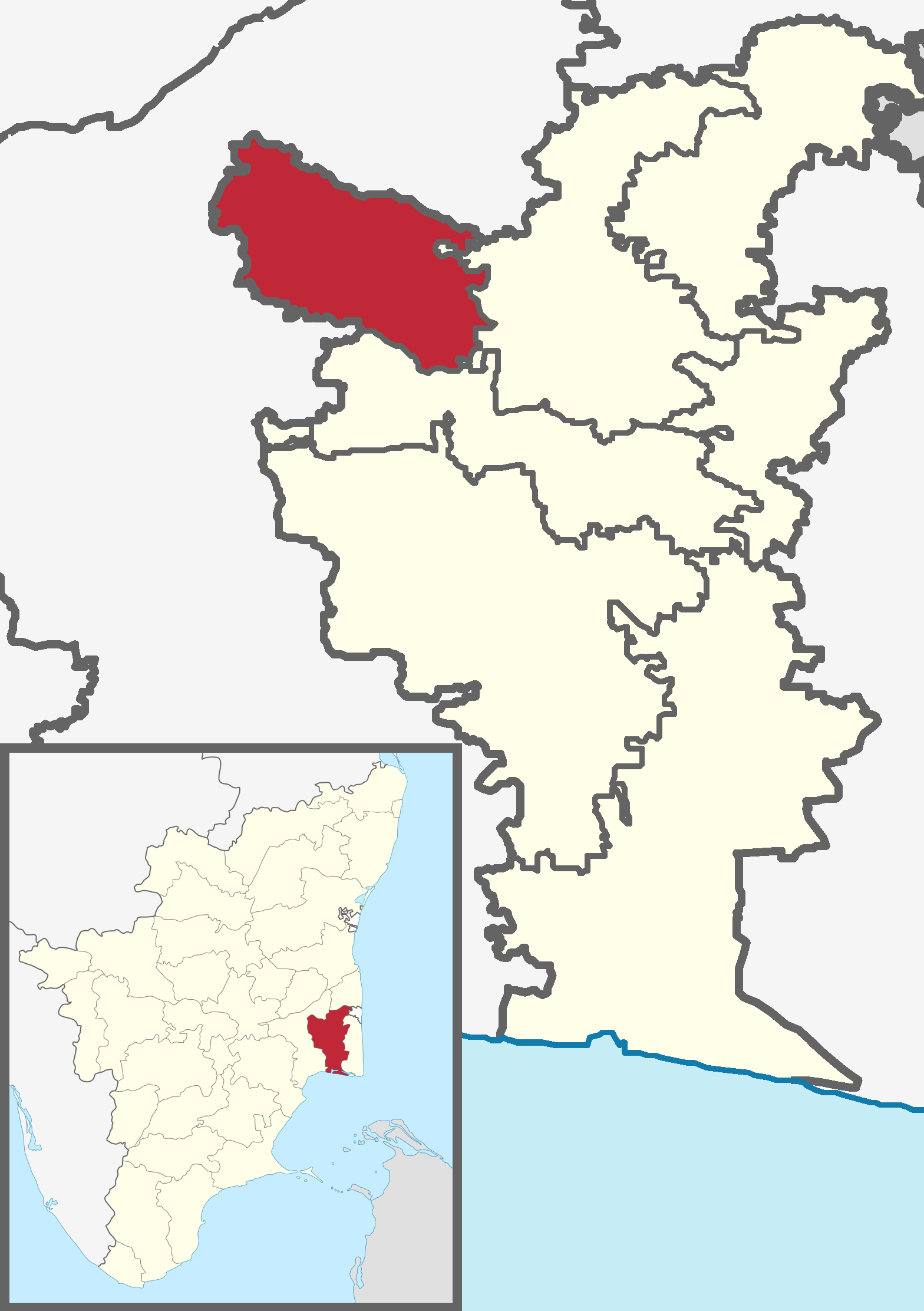

Valangaiman Taluk is a taluk in Tiruvarur district of the Indian state of Tamil Nadu. The headquarters of the taluk is the town of Valangaiman. Valangaiman taluk has 68 villages.

== Demographics ==
According to the 2011 census, the taluk of Valangaiman city had a population of 100438 with 49,948 males and 50,490 females. There were 1011 women for every 1000 men. The taluk had a literacy rate of 72.07. Child population in the age group below 6 was 5,034 Males and 4,626 Females.
