= Periyakulam taluk =

Periyakulam taluk is a taluk of Theni district of the Indian state of Tamil Nadu. The headquarters of the taluk is the town of Periyakulam.

== Demographics ==
According to the 2011 census, the taluk of Periyakulam had a population of 215,979 with 109,863 males and 106,116 females. There were 966 women for every 1000 men. The taluk had a literacy rate of 70.85. Child population in the age group below 6 was 10,100 Males and 9,416 Females.
