= Andipatti taluk =

Coordinates: 10°00′N 77°37′E

Andipatti taluk is a taluk of Theni district of the Indian state of Tamil Nadu. The headquarters of the taluk is the town of Andipatti.

== General information ==
Andipatti is a taluk in the Theni District of Tamil Nadu, India. Its headquarters is Andipatti town. It is located 18 km east from district headquarters Theni and 520 km from the state capital Chennai towards the north.

Andipatti Taluk is bounded by Theni Taluk to the west, Periyakulam Taluk to the north, Usilampatti Taluk to the east, Vattalkundu Taluk to the north. Theni Allinagaram, Periyakulam, Usilampatti, and Sholavandan are nearby cities.

Andipatti's elevation is 292 m. It is on the border of the Theni and Madurai districts.

Kodaikanal, Palani Hills (Palani Hills), Madurai, Devikulam, Dindigul are the nearby tourist destinations.

== Demographics ==
According to the 2011 census, the taluk of Andipatti had a population of 212,519, with 107,936 males and 104,583 females. There were 969 women for every 1,000 men. The taluk had a literacy rate of 64.29%. Child population in the age group below 6 years were 10,605 males and 9912 females.
