= Kuthalam taluk =

Coordinates: 11.1°N 79.55°E

Kuthalam taluk is a taluk in the Mayiladuthurai District in the state of Tamil Nadu, India. The administrative headquarters is the town of Kuthalam.

== Demographics ==
According to the 2011 census, the taluk of Kuthalam had a population of 131,927 with 64,874 males and 67,053 females. There were 1034 women for every 1000 men. The taluk had a literacy rate of 75.78. Child population in the age group below 6 was 6,401 Males and 6,316 Females.
