= Sankarapuram taluk =

Sankarapuram is a taluk of Kallakurichi district of the southern Indian state of Tamil Nadu. The headquarters of this taluk is Sankarapuram town.
