= Paramakudi taluk =

- Interactive map of Paramakudi taluk

Population
  - Total: 265,003

Paramakudi taluk is a taluk of Ramanathapuram district of the Indian state of Tamil Nadu. See Paramakudi for more information.

== Demographics ==
According to the 2011 census, the taluk of Paramakudi had a population of 265,003 with 134,080 males and 130,923 females a ratio of 976 women for every 1000 men. The taluk had a literacy rate of 74%. Child population in the age group below 6 was 11,966 Males and 11,552 Females.

== Villages ==
- Kamuthakudi
