= Tirumanancheri Udhvaganathar Temple =

Hindu temple in Tamil Nadu, India

- திருமணஞ்சேரி உத்வாகநாதர் கோயில்
- Gopuram of the Udhvaganathar Temple

- Location within Tamil Nadu

Religion
- Affiliation: Hinduism
- District: Mayiladuthurai
- Deity: Udhvaganathar or Kalyana Sundareswarar (Siva)

Location
- Location: Thirumanancheri
- State: Tamil Nadu
- Country: India
- Coordinates: 11°06′24.8″N 79°34′11.6″E

Architecture
- Architect: Dravidian
- Temple: 1
- Inscriptions: 5 (2 from Parantaka I & 3 from Rajaraja I

Tirumanancheri Udhvaganathar Temple, also known as Kalyana Sundareswarar temple, is a Hindu temple dedicated to Shiva, located in the village of Thirumanancheri in Mayiladuthurai district, Tamil Nadu, India. The presiding deity is Udhvaganathar and his consort, Parvati is known as Kokhila.

The temple is one of the Paadal Petra Sthalams, Shiva temples praised in the Tevaram hymns composed by the Shaivite Nayanars Appar and Sambandar. It is the 25th of the 276 Paadal Petra Sthalams in the Chola Nadu region north of the Kaveri River. The temple has two inscriptions dating to the reign of Parantaka I, and three inscriptions from Rajaraja I.

== History ==
The temple was originally built of brick in the 7th century CE, during the time of Appar and Sambandar, and appears to have been reconstructed in stone around the fourth regnal year of Parantaka I. Two inscriptions from the fourth regnal year of Parantaka I are found at the temple, along with three inscriptions from the reign of Rajaraja I. The latter record a gift by Sembiyan Mahadevi, the mother of Uttama Chola.

== Significance ==
The temple is one of the 275 Paadal Petra Sthalams, Shiva temples praised in the early medieval Tevaram hymns composed by the Tamil Shaivite Nayanars Tirugnanasambandar and Tirunavukkarasar. It is also one of the Shiva temples located along the banks of the Kaveri River.

According to temple tradition, Shiva manifested as Kalyana Sundarar and married Goddess Kokilambal (parvathi) at this temple. Devotees believe that worshipping here can help overcome obstacles and delays in marriage. Rituals associated with the divine marriage are performed daily, and devotees may take home the garland offered during the worship as part of this belief.

== Legend ==
According to temple legend, Goddess Parvati once requested Shiva to marry her again according to earthly customs. Shiva agreed to marry her in a future Brahma kalpa. Distressed by the delay, Parvati began to act indifferently towards him, and Shiva cursed her to be born as a cow on Earth.

After seeking relief from the curse, Parvati assumed the form of a cow, accompanied by Lakshmi, Saraswati and Indrani, who also took the same form. They wandered through places including Asikkadu and Arasankadu. Vishnu assumed the form of a cowherd and tended the cows. Pleased by the milk poured over his body and the marks left by the cow's hooves, Shiva decided to marry Parvati as she had wished. Parvati subsequently appeared in the sacrificial fire of a yajna performed by the sage Bharata and married Shiva at Thirumanancheri.

The tradition associates different stages of the legend with several temples in the region. Parvati was cursed at Therazhundur, assumed the form of a cow at Asikkadu, and was tended by Vishnu in the form of a cowherd at Komal. Shiva received the marks of the cow's hooves at Thirukkolambam, and the cow attained liberation at Thiruvavaduthurai. Parvati emerged from Bharata's sacrificial fire at Thiruthuruthi (Kuthalam). Wedding-related rituals were performed at Thiruvelvikudi and Kurumulaipalayam, while Shiva was ceremonially welcomed at Ethirkolpadi before marrying Parvati at Thirumanancheri.

== Architecture ==
The temple has a five-tiered rajagopuram (main gateway tower). Inside, the flagpole, balipeedam and Nandi are located along the main axis, with shrines dedicated to Vinayagar on the right and Natarajar on the left. The presiding deity, Uthwaganathar, also known as Arulvallanathar, is worshipped as a swayambhu lingam (self-manifested lingam).

The devakoshta figures on the outer walls of the garbhagriha are Dakshinamurti on the south, Lingodbhavar on the west and Brahma on the north. The southern wall of the ardhamandapa features Bhikshatanamurti, Ganapati and Nataraja, while its northern wall features Adisesha, Durga and Kankalamurti. These sculptures appear to date to the reign of Uttama Chola.

== Literary mention ==
Tirugnanasambandar describes the feature of the deity as in Gnanasambandar Tevaram, II: 16: 4. Tirunavukkarasar describes the feature of the deity in Tirunavukkarasar Tevaram, V: 87: 6.

== Gallery ==
Standing black granite murti (Dvarapalaka)

Distant view of the temple gopuram

Inner prakaram corridor

Small outdoor shrine

Ornate stucco - Siva and Parvathi wedding

Pathway towards the temple gopuram

Pathway within the temple premises

Prakaram corridor

Long pathway along prakaram walls

Black granite murti

Black stone murti

== See also ==
- MelaThirumanancheri Iyravatheswarar Temple

== Bibliography ==
- Balasubrahmanyam, S. R. (1971). Early Chola Temples: Parantaka I to Rajaraja I, A.D. 907–985. Orient Longman. pp. 188–190.
- Handbook of Tamil Nadu. Government of Tamil Nadu. 1996. p. 515.
- Singaravelu, T. N. (1981). திருமணஞ்சேரி தல வரலாறு [Tirumanancheri Temple Legend] (in Tamil).
