= Elanthangudi =

- Village
- Location within Tamil Nadu Location within India
- Coordinates: 11.0571°N 79.6486°E
- Country: India
- State: Tamil Nadu
- District: Mayiladuthurai
- Region: Cauvery Delta
- Time zone: UTC+05:30 (IST)
- Pincode: 609401

Elanthangudi is a village in the Mayiladuthurai district of Tamil Nadu, India. It is located 5 kilometres (3.1 mi) south of the town of Mayiladuthurai in the direction of Thiruvarur and roughly 300 kilometres (190 mi) from the state capital Chennai.

== Scholars and educators ==
=== Scholars ===
Elanthangudi has a rich history of scholars. Initially, they used to produce Islamic scholars from Madrasa; however, this practice was later discontinued due to financial constraints. Nowadays, the Gents Madrasa is not functioning.

In 2013, a Women's Madrasa was established in Elanthangudi by Alhaj Tajudeen. It is currently producing female Islamic scholars in the area. The Madrasa is located on Azad Street.

=== Educators ===
Elanthangudi's first graduate was the Late Alhaj Mr.K.M.Zakaria, who completed his B.Com. in 1951. Subsequently, he earned a diploma in economics in Vietnam while working as a Warehouse Manager in the US Army.

As per the survey result 2013 : 83.7% Of Youths Are graduated in Elanthangudi Village. its shows Elanthangudi has a wealthy future generation .

Schools

=== Schools ===
There are the Four Following Schools in Elanthangudi village

1. Government Higher Sec School

2. Government elementary School

3. Montecherri primary school (Private Sector)

4. ALAMAN elementary school (Private Sector)

=== Research Academy ===
Integrated Farm and Organic Research Academy is located near to Takwa Palli Masjid, this Academy stated by Mr.Alispak in 2017.

== Economy ==
Initially, the majority of people in Elanthangudi were engaged in agriculture and various businesses across Asian countries. However, since 1975, a significant number of individuals have opted to earn a livelihood in the Gulf Cooperation Council (GCC) countries.

Even though agriculture continues to play a crucial role as a source of income in Elanthangudi Village, many residents have established their businesses not only in Tamil Nadu but also in East Asian countries.

== Politics ==
The village is a part of the Mayiladuthurai Lok Sabha constituency. The current Member of Parliament from the constituency is S. Ramalingam of the Dravida Munnetra Kazhagam party.

Elanthangudi is represented in the Tamil Nadu Legislative Assembly by the Poompuhar Assembly constituency.

- The voter base is 3200 people who are above 18 years of age.
- There is no breakdown of men and women separately.
- Total Population Might be between 4000-4500

Position Name	Winner	Party	Period	Votes Earned
MP (Member Of The Parliament)	Sudha Ramakrishnan	Indian National Congress	2024–present	5,18,459 (Winning Percentage: 47.67%)
MLA (Member of the Legislative Assembly)	Nivedha M. Murugan	Dravida Munnetra Kazhagam	2021–present(2026)	96,102
Panjayath President	L.C Mathivaanan (M.Seetha Lakshmi)	Dravida Munnetra Kazhagam	2019–present(2024)	
Jamath (Muthavalli)	S.A Amanullah B.A, B.L.,	---	2025(May)–Present	Election Conducted by TamilNadu Wakf Board, Votes are earned 214 (Winning Percentage: 80.75%) === Members Are Follows === : Will be declared

== Culture and religion ==
Elanthangudi is known as a Muslim village, but people of other religions can also be found east and west of the village. There are four temples and four mosques in Elanthangudi.

== Important (Markable) Places In Elanthangudi Village ==
Place Name	Location
IOB Bank	Near to River Bend
ATM	very Next To Bank
Post Office	Near to River Bend
Ration shop 1	Near To Darha
Ration shop 2	Near To Chekadi Street (Main Road)
First Aid Hospital	Beside Of Ration shop 1
Medical Shop 1	Very Next To Chinna Pllivaasal
Medical Shop 2	OPP. To Ration shop 1
Main Masjid	inside the village near to Pallivaasal street & kamaliya Street
Thaqwa Masjid	End of the Village towards East Side
Road Side Masjith	Main Road( Thiruvarur Road)
Alnoor Masjid	End Of the Village Towards South Side
New Masjid (Under Construction)	Near To Post Office
Vinayagar Temple	Main Road (Near To Railway Street)
Mariamman Koil (Temple)	Mariamman Koil Street (Into Railway Street)
Government Higher Sec School	Opp. To Post Office
Government elementary School	Near To Akbar Street
ALAMAN elementary school	Main Road (Opp.Railway Street)
Agriculture college	Inside Alispak Farm ( Near To Taqwah Masjid)
VAO Office	Near To Taqwah Masjid
Panjayath Office	Near To VAO Office
Rice Mill 1	Main Road (After Railway Street from Chinna pallivaasal)
Rice Mill 2	In Azad Street
Women's Madarasa	In Azad Street
Nikkah Mahal (old)	in Mubarak Street (Opp To Pallivaasal Pool)
Nikkah Mahal (New) Under Construction	Opp To Pallivaasal Pool and near to Arabic School
Islamic library	Inside Madarasa
Nawasama Noolagam	In Azad Street(end of the street)

== Photo gallery ==
Photo	Photo Description	Photo Taken on (Approximate year)
Mosque	Masjid Rahmath front view	2016
KMZ	Elanthangudi Alhaji Mr.K.M.Zakariya's Receiving Diploma Convocation Photo in Vietnam(Diploma in Economies) followed by his B.Com., Graduate from Madras University in 1951	1956
	Masjid Rahmath Old View	Early 1980
பிரசுரம்	தீண்டாமை ஒழிப்பு சமூக நீதி மாநாடு துண்டு பிரசுரம்	1995
