= N. Renganathan =

Indian politician (born 1949)

Member of the Legislative Assembly (MLA)
- In office 2001–2006
- Preceded by: G. Mohandasan
- Succeeded by: Periyasamy
- Constituency: Poompuhar

Personal details
- Born: 30 October 1949 Kunjimedu, Tamil Nadu, India
- Party: All India Anna Dravida Munnetra Kazhagam (AIADMK)
- Profession: Agriculturist

N. Renganathan is an Indian politician and a former Member of the Tamil Nadu Legislative Assembly. He hails from Kunjimedu village in the Mayiladuthurai district. Having completed a master's degree and a Diploma in Cooperation, Renganathan is a member of the All India Anna Dravida Munnetra Kazhagam (AIADMK) party. He was elected to the Tamil Nadu Legislative Assembly from the Poompuhar Assembly constituency in the 2001 state elections.

== Electoral Performance ==
=== 2001 ===
2001 Tamil Nadu Legislative Assembly election: Poompuhar
Party	Candidate	Votes	%	±%
AIADMK	N. Renganathan	53,760	50.55%	+18.58
DMK	M. Mohammed Siddiq	46,305	43.54%	−6.34
MDMK	S. M. Musahudeen	3,542	3.33%	−8.56
Independent	K. S. Raja Alias Kannadasan	1,679	1.58%	New
MNK(PLP)	T. V. Sampath	1,067	1.00%	New
Margin of victory		7,455	7.01%	−10.90%
Turnout		106,353	67.03%	−6.39%
Registered electors		158,741		
AIADMK gain from DMK		Swing	0.67%	
