= Annappanpettai Sundareswarar Temple =

Hindu temple in Tamil Nadu, India

Annappanpettai Sundareswarar Temple (அன்னப்பன்பேட்டை சுந்தரேஸ்வரர் கோயில்) is a Hindu temple located at village Annappanpettai in Sirkzahi block, Mayiladuthurai district of Tamil Nadu, India. The historical name of the place is Kalikamoor. The presiding deity is Shiva. He is called as Sundareswarar. His consort is known as Azhagammai.

== Significance ==
It is one of the shrines of the 275 Paadal Petra Sthalams - Shiva Sthalams glorified in the early medieval Tevaram poems by Tamil Saivite Nayanar Tirugnanasambandar. The place is Kollikamur and sage Parasara is believed to have worshipped the presiding deity.

== Literary mentions ==
Tirugnanasambandar describes the feature of the deity as:

மாசு பிறக்கிய மேனியாரு மருவுந் துவராடை

மீசு பிறக்கிய மெய்யினாரு மறியா ரவர்தோற்றங்
காசினி நீர்த்திரண் மண்டியெங்கும் வளமார் கலிக்காமூர்

ஈசனை யெந்தை பிரானையேத்தி நினைவார் வினைபோமே.
