= Anaimelagaram =

- village
- Interactive map of Anaimelagaram
- Coordinates: 11.0919334°N 79.5961532°E
- Country: India
- State: Tamil Nadu
- District: Mayiladuthurai

Population (2001)
  - Total: 1,792

Languages
  - Official: Tamil
- Time zone: UTC+5:30 (IST)

Anaimelagaram is a village in the Mayiladuthurai taluk of Mayiladuthurai district, Tamil Nadu, India.

== Demographics ==
As of 2001 census, Anaimelagaram had a total population of 2637 with 1260 males and 1377 females. The sex ratio was 1093. The literacy rate was 71.74.
