= Ananthanallur =

- village
- Interactive map of Ananthanallur
- Coordinates: 11.0342719°N 79.6051748°E
- Country: India
- State: Tamil Nadu
- District: Mayiladuthurai

Population (2001)
  - Total: 1,295

Languages
  - Official: Tamil
- Time zone: UTC+5:30 (IST)

Ananthanallur is a village in the Mayiladuthurai taluk of Mayiladuthurai district, Tamil Nadu, India.Ananthanallur village has higher literacy rate compared to Tamil Nadu.

== Demographics ==
As of 2001 census, Ananthanallur had a total population of 1295 with 642 males and 653 females. The sex ratio was 1017. The literacy rate was 73.25.
