= S. Pavunraj =

Indian politician

Member of the Tamil Nadu Legislative Assembly
- In office 16 May 2011 – 11 May 2021
- Preceded by: K. Periyasamy
- Succeeded by: Nivedha M. Murugan
- Constituency: Poompuhar

Personal details
- Party: All India Anna Dravida Munnetra Kazhagam

S. Pavunraj is an Indian politician and former 2016 member of the Tamil Nadu Legislative Assembly from the Poompuhar constituency. He represents the All India Anna Dravida Munnetra Kazhagam party. He passed 5th standard in Aathuppakkam school.
