= Agarakkirangudi =

- village
- Location in Tamil Nadu, India
- Coordinates: 11.076938°N 79.658631°E
- Country: India
- State: Tamil Nadu
- District: Mayiladuthurai

Population (2001)
  - Total: 1,792

Languages
  - Official: Tamil
- Time zone: UTC+5:30 (IST)

Agarakkirangudi is a village in the Mayiladuthurai taluk of Mayiladuthurai district, Tamil Nadu, India.

== Demographics ==
As of 2001 census, Agarakkirangudi had a total population of 1792 with 915 males and 877 females. The sex ratio was 978. The literacy rate was 74.01.
