= Uthavedeeswarar Temple =

Shiva temple in Tamil Nadu, India

- Kuthalam Sonnavararivar temple
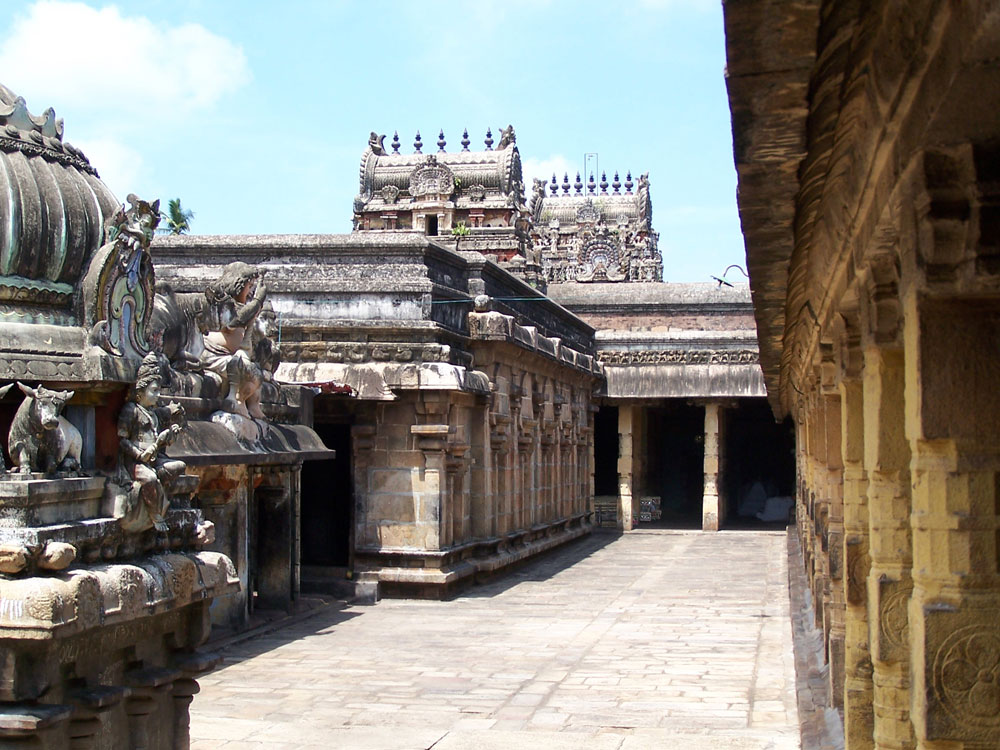
- "Sanctum" of Uthavedeeswarar Temple

- Location within Tamil Nadu

Religion
- Affiliation: Hinduism
- District: Mayiladuthurai
- Deity: Sonnavararivar or Uthavedeeswarar (Siva)
- Features: Temple tree: Uddhala

Location
- Location: Kuthalam
- State: Tamil Nadu
- Country: India
- Coordinates: 11.0785°N 79.5636°E

Architecture
- Architect: Dravidian
- Inscriptions: 3

Uthavedeeswarar Temple, also known as Kuthalam Sonnavararivar temple, is a Hindu temple in the town of Kuthalam in the Mayiladuthurai district of Tamil Nadu, India. The temple is dedicated to lord Sonnavararivar, a form of Shiva. The temples is the 154th Tevaram Paadal Petra Sthalam and the 37th Shiva temple located on the southern bank of the Kaveri in Chola Nadu. The temple is associated with Tevaram hymns composed by Appar and Sundarar.

== Significance ==
Shiva as Uthavedeeswarar is the presiding deity. According to Hindu mythology, Shiva was married to Parvathi at this place and the god is believed to have left his sandals here before embarking for Mount Kailash. The Saivite saint Sambandar has composed hymns in praise of the temple in Thevaram. Several sages like Kashyapa, Angirasa, Gotama, Markandeya, Vashista, Kulastya and Agastya. The temple is counted as one of the temples built on the banks of River Kaveri. It is believed that the river was flowing on both sides of the village.

== Legend ==
According to temple legend, Parvati was born as the daughter of Bharata Muni on the banks of the river Kaveri and married Shiva at Turuttiyur. Shiva is said to have emerged from the temple linga to fulfil his promise to Parvati, giving rise to the epithet Sonnavararivar (“He who kept his word”). The name Turutti refers to an island in the Kaveri river, while Uttalam, the place where Shiva is believed to have stood, is traditionally associated with the modern name Kuthalam.

The temple is praised in the Tevaram hymns of Appar and Sundarar. According to tradition, Sundarar was cured of an ailment after bathing in the temple's sacred tank.

== Architecture ==
The temple faces west and has a five-tiered main rajagopuram. The shrine of the goddess (Ambal) is located in a separate enclosure with a three-tiered rajagopuram. The temple consists of a sanctum sanctorum, antarala, ardha-mandapa, and mukha-mandapa.

== History ==
An inscription of Rajaraja I, dated to his seventh regnal year, records Sembiyan Mahadevi, the mother of Uttama Chola, in connection with the temple and her provision of land for its maintenance. Another inscription refers to the temple as being located at Vingunir-tirutturutti in Tiruvalundur-nadu. (Note: During the Chola period, Thiruvilandur a residential neighbourhood and suburb of Mayiladuthurai served as the administrative centre of Tiruvindalur-nadu, a nadu-level administrative division. Tiruvindalur-nadu formed part of Rajadhiraja-valanadu, a larger administrative division comparable to a present-day district.) The temple is also noted for the Uddhala tree, which is traditionally associated with the temple.

== Gallery ==
Temple Main gopuram

Inner mandapa

Uthala tree

Vimana of the main shrine

Another entrance

Vimana of the main shrine

Amman shrine

Niche of the main shrine

== See also ==
- Poompuhar
- Mayuranathaswami Temple
- Thiruvilindur Copper plates
