= Asikkadu =

Asikkadu akilvanam
- town
- Location within Tamil Nadu Location within India
- Coordinates: 11.061169°N 79.609187°E
- Country: India
- State: Tamil Nadu
- District: Mayiladuthurai

Asikkadu (Ahilvanam) is a village in Mayiladuthurai taluk, Mayiladuthurai district, state of Tamil Nadu, India.

Asikkadu is located 5.7 km from its taluk main town Kuttalam, 9.8 km from its district headquarters Mayiladuthurai, and 232 km from its state capital Chennai.

Nearby villages are Maraiyur (1.6 km), Anaimelagaram (2.4 km), Tholuthalangudi (3 km), Sitharkadu (3.4 km) and Kozhaiyur (3.6 km). Nearest towns are Kuttalam (5.7 km), Mayiladuthurai (6.1 km), Sembanar Koil (14.5 km) and Sirkazhi (23.5 km).

Kuttalam, Alangudi, Anandhanallur, Arivalur, Asikkadu and Edakudi are villages in the same Kuttalam Talu.
