= Mayiladuthurai block =

Coordinates: 11°06′07″N 79°34′47″E

Mayiladuthurai block is a revenue block in the Mayiladuthurai taluk of Mayiladuthurai district, Tamil Nadu, India. There are a total of 54 panchayat villages in this block.
