= Semponarkoil Swarnapureeswarar Temple =

Hindu temple in Tamil Nadu, India

Swarnapureeswarar Temple, Sembanarkoil
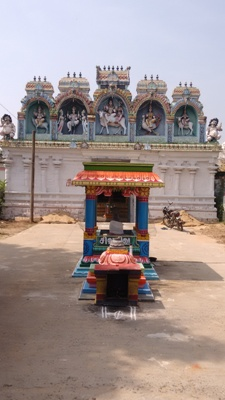

Religion
- Affiliation: Hinduism
- Deity: Lord Shiva

Location
- Location: Sembanarkoil near Mayiladuthurai on the road to Tharangambadi
- State: Tamil Nadu
- Country: India
- Interactive map of Swarnapureeswarar Temple, Sembanarkoil

Semponarkoil Swarnapureeswarar Temple is a Hindu temple located at Semponnarkoil in Mayiladuthurai district of Tamil Nadu, India. This place is also called as Tiruchemponpalli. The historical name of the place is Lakshmipuri and Indirapuri. The presiding deity is Shiva. He is called as Swarnapureeswarar. His consort is known as Suguntha Kundalambikai. The temple is dedicated to Shiva.

== Deity ==
The presiding deity is Swarnapureeswarar and his consort is Suguntha Kundalambikai. The temple has been praised in hymns by the Saivite saints Sambandar and Thirunavukkarasar. According to Sambandhar, "No miseries would peep in to the life of those worshipping my Lord gracing from Semponpalli with Mother on His left and holding in His hand the Mazhu (axe) and His long hair glittering as golden thread." The temple is counted as one of the temples built on the banks of River Kaveri.

== Significance ==
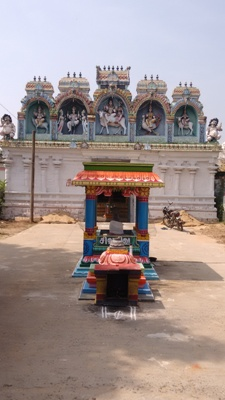
The entrance of the temple

It is one of the shrines of the 275 Paadal Petra Sthalams - Shiva Sthalams glorified in the early medieval Tevaram poems by Tamil Saivite Nayanars Tirugnanasambandar and Tirunavukkarasar.

== Literary mention ==
Tirugnanasambandar describes the feature of the deity as:

வானார் திங்கள் வளர்புன் சடைவைத்துத்

தேனார் செம்பொன் பள்ளி மேவிய
ஊனார் தலையிற் பலிகொண் டுழல்வாழ்க்கை

ஆனான் கழலே யடைந்து வாழ்மினே.

== Gallery ==
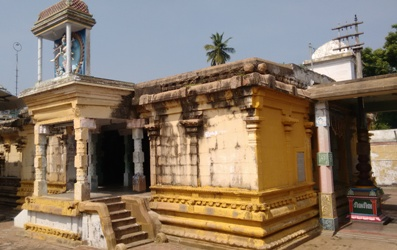
Temple

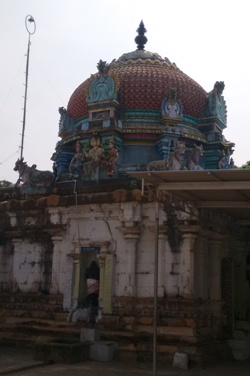
Vimana of the presiding deity

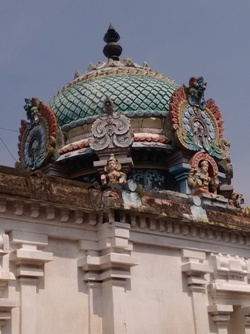
Vimana of the Goddess
