= Subramaniya Swamy Temple, Thiruvidaikazhi =

Hindu temple in Tamil Nadu, India

Subramaniya Swamy Temple
- Thiruvidaikazhi Murugan Temple
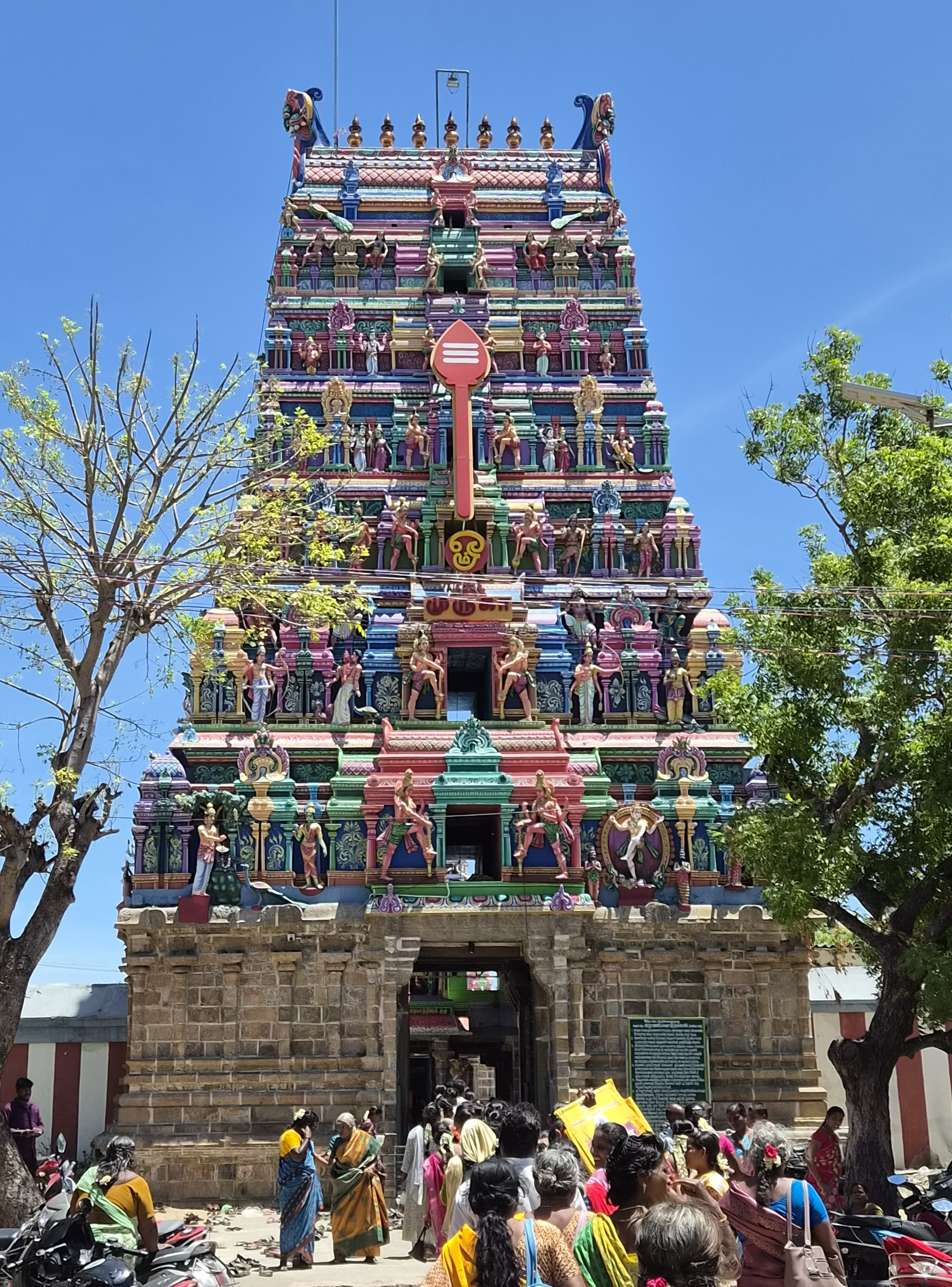
- Exterior view of the Rajagopuram tower

- Location in Tamil Nadu

Religion
- Affiliation: Hinduism
- District: Mayiladuthurai
- Deity: Subramaniya Swamy (Murugan); Kameswari

Location
- Location: Thiruvidaikazhi, Mayiladuthurai
- State: Tamil Nadu
- Country: India
- Coordinates: 11°02′29″N 79°47′08″E

Architecture
- Type: Dravidian architecture
- Temple: 1

Subramaniya Swamy Temple, also known as Thiruvidaikazhi Murugan Temple, is a Hindu temple located in the village Thiruvidaikazhi in the Sembanarkoil Block of Mayiladuthurai district, Tamil Nadu, India. The temple is dedicated to Subramaniya Swamy, a Hindu deity widely known as Murugan.

Apart from the six abodes of Murugan (Arupadai Veedu), which are associated with his divine plays (Thiruvilaiyadal), only two sacred sites are traditionally believed to have been sanctified by the touch of Lord Murugan’s divine feet. One is Vallimalai, where Lord Murugan is said to have married Valli. The other is Thiruvidaikazhi, where, according to tradition, Lord Murugan’s engagement to his consort Deivanai took place, and where he later performed penance to attain absolution from sin (paava vimocanam) following the slaying of the demon Hiranyasura.

The temple is notable for housing the Hindu deities Murugan and Shiva together within the same sanctum sanctorum (garbhagriha), a feature that is considered distinctive among Murugan temples. The temple is associated with Tamil devotional literature and is mentioned in both the Thiruvisaippa of the Thevaram corpus and the Thiruppugazh hymns.

== Location ==
The temple is located in the village Thiruvidaikazhi, a residential neighborhood in Mayiladuthurai on the Mayiladuthurai to Tharangambadi state highway, a couple of kilometers south of the Thirukkadaiyur. It is about 288 km (179 mi) southeast of Chennai, the state capital. The nearest railway station is Mayiladuthurai railway junction, 26 km (16 mi) from the temple. The nearest bus stop is Thiruvidaikazhi, 1 km (0.62 mi) from the temple.

== Mythology ==
The history of Thiruvidaikazhi temple is related to the mythology of Hindu god Murugan. As per the Tamil traditions of Kanda Puranam and Hindu Purāṇas, Lord Murugan was engaged in the divine battle against the asura Surapadma at Thiruchendur, a town in Tamil Nadu. At Surasamharam, Surapadma was slain, his second son, Iraniyan, withdrew from the battlefield to fulfill his ancestral rites. To evade Murugan, Iraniyan assumed the form of a shark and concealed himself in the sea near Poompuhar, close to present-day Tharangambadi.

Iraniyan’s presence caused great distress to the inhabitants of the southern coastal regions of Poompuhar. Unable to bear his afflictions, the people fervently prayed to Lord Murugan for protection. With the grace of his mother, Parashakti, Murugan discerned Iraniyan’s deception, pursued him to the seashore, and ultimately vanquished him.

Although Iraniyan was an asura, he was a devoted follower of Lord Shiva. According to legend, Murugan incurred a dosha (sin) for slaying a devotee of Shiva. Following his mother Parashakti’s guidance, Murugan journeyed to Thiruvidaikazhi to atone for this act. There, he bathed in the sacred Saravanapoigai (sacred pond in English) and, beneath the holy Kura tree (commonly identified as the bottle-brush tree), installed a Shiva Lingam. He worshipped the Lingam with Kura flowers and performed penance.

Pleased with his devotion, Lord Shiva absolved Murugan of the sin and requested his son Kumaran to remain at this sacred site to bless devotees. As per the legend, Shiva himself took residence just behind Murugan at this location, as reflected in the temple’s layout and history.

The site where Murugan was absolved of the sin of killing Iraniyan came to be known as Vidaikkazhi (“the place of absolution”). According to another legend, since Murugan worshipped Shiva beneath the Kura tree, the place also came to be called Thirukkuravadi. Stone inscriptions from this temple refer to the presiding deity Murugan as Thirukuraithudayar also spelled as Thirukkuratthudaiyar, and state that worship at this shrine absolves devotees of their sins.

== History ==
The temple is mentioned in the Tamil devotional literature and is mentioned in both the Thiruvisaippa and the Thiruppugazh hymns. In the Thiruvisaippa, the saint Senthanar praises Murugan as Kumaravel; tradition holds that Senthanar attained mukti (liberation) at this temple. The 15th-century poet-saint Arunagirinathar is also credited with composing Thiruppugazh hymns in praise of Murugan worshipped at this temple.

According to the sthala purāṇa (temple legend), the temple is believed to have been originally built by the Chola king Musukunda Chakravarti. Historical and architectural evidence suggests that the earliest structure of the temple dates to the 8th–9th century CE, corresponding to the Pallava–early Chola period.

== Architecture ==
The temple features an east-facing rajagopuram with seven tiers, adorned with vibrant sculptures of Hindu gods and decorative elements. The temple entrance has a flagploe (kodimaram) and the sacrificial altar (balipitham), followed by a shrine to Lord Vinayaka.

The front mandapa contains stone inscriptions bearing hymns from devotional works such as the Thiruppugazh, Vel Viruththam sung by Arunagirinathar, and related compositions, highlighting the temple’s association with Tamil devotional literature.

On the right side of the main sanctum, Deivanai is enshrined in a separate shrine, depicted in a penitent and ascetic posture. Within the prakarams (corridors), there are additional shrines, including one dedicated to Vinayaka.

The sthala vriksha (sacred tree) of the temple is the Kuramaram (Kura tree), which stands prominently within the complex. Tradition holds that Lord Murugan meditated upon Lord Shiva beneath this tree. Beneath the Kuramaram, a Patra Lingam has been installed. Devotional belief holds that meditation beneath the Kuramaram aids mental focus and inner tranquility.

In a separate shrine, Thirukameswarar is worshipped in the form of a Shiva Lingam. Surrounding this sanctum is a distinctive arrangement unique to the temple: the Spatika Lingam positioned in the front, Dakshinamurthy to the south, Papanasa Peruman to the west, and the Vasishta Lingam to the north.

Along the inner corridor, shrines to Chandra (the Moon God), Arunagirinathar, and Sendanar appear in sequence, followed by those of the Nava Shaktis, Subramanya, Naganatha Lingam, Gajalakshmi, and the festival deity of Lord Muruga, who is depicted holding a vel in one hand and bow in another hand.

== Religious importance and festivals ==
=== Significance ===
The temple is traditionally known as the “Thiruchendur of the Chola region”, reflecting its importance among Murugan shrines in Chola Nadu.

According to local tradition, this is the sacred site where Deivanai, desiring to marry Lord Murugan, performed penance. It is believed that the engagement (nichayathartham) of Murugan and Deivanai took place at this location. Deivanai is depicted with her face gently inclined in shyness, symbolizing modesty and devotion. Devotees believe that worshipping Deivanai on Fridays helps remove obstacles to marriage.

Legend further states that beneath the Kura tree, where Murugan worshipped Lord Shiva, on the same place below the tree Rahu Bhagavan also performed penance and worshipped Murugan, wash off his sins. As a result, it is believed that devotees afflicted with Rahu dosha who pray at this temple are blessed with early marriage and harmony between spouses. The temple is notable for the absence of a Navagraha shrine; instead, Murugan himself is believed to bestow the blessings of all nine planetary deities. Devotional belief holds that worshipping the presiding deity alone alleviates all forms of Navagraha-related afflictions.

The temple complex houses sixteen forms of Vinayaka, which is considered a distinctive feature. Another unique aspect is the depiction of Lord Murugan standing alongside Vinayaka beneath the flagstaff (kodimaram).

It is also noteworthy that Ayyanar shrines are situated along the four boundaries of the temple. Additionally, unlike most Murugan temples where the peacock serves as the vahana, Murugan is associated with the elephant vahana at this shrine, marking a distinctive local tradition.

=== Festivals ===
The temple is administered by the Hindu Religious and Charitable Endowments (HR&CE) Department of the Government of Tamil Nadu. Four daily pujas are performed in accordance with traditions. All major festivals associated with Shiva and Murugan temples are observed in this temple.

Prominent festivals celebrated at the temple include Thaipusam, Panguni Uthiram, Vaikasi Visakam, and Thirukarthigai.

During the Thaipusam festival, a significant event is the padayatra (pilgrimage on foot) undertaken by devotees from Swamimalai Murugan temple, which is observed as a major annual celebration.

Another notable pilgrimage associated with the temple is the 50-kilometre padayatra from the town Chidambaram to Thiruvidaikazhi, conducted annually on the first Friday of the Tamil month of Purattasi. Devotees commence the journey on Friday and reach the Thiruvidaikazhi Murugan Temple by Saturday night. On the following Sunday, paal (milk) kavadi is carried from the mandapa opposite the temple, and a maha abhishekam is performed for Lord Murugan beneath the sacred Kura tree, followed by deepa aradhana.

== Bibliography ==
- University of Wisconsin - Madison (1989). Tirukkōyil (in Tamil). Hindu Religious and Charitable Endowments (Administration) Department.
