= Bronze Age India =

Overview of the Indian subcontinent during the Bronze Age

The Bronze Age in the Indian subcontinent begins around 3000 BCE, and in the end gives rise to the Indus Valley Civilisation, which had its (mature) period between 2600 BCE and 1900 BCE. It continues into the Rigvedic period, the early part of the Vedic period. It is succeeded by the Iron Age in India, beginning in around 1000 BCE.

South India, by contrast, remains in the Mesolithic stage until about 2500 BCE.

In the 2nd millennium BCE, there may have been cultural contact between North and South India, even though South India skips a Bronze Age proper and enters the Iron Age from the Chalcolithic stage directly.

In February 2006, a school teacher in the village of Sembian-Kandiyur in Tamil Nadu discovered a stone celt with an inscription estimated to be up to 3,500 years old. Indian epigraphist Iravatham Mahadevan postulated that the writing was in Indus script and called the find "the greatest archaeological discovery of a century in Tamil Nadu".

== Timeline of Phase in Bronze Age ==
Time line (BC)	Phase	Era
3300–2600	Early Harappan (Early Bronze Age)	Regionalisation Era c. 4000–2500/2300 BCE (Shaffer) c. 5000–3200 BCE (Coningham & Young)
3300–2800	Harappan 1 (Ravi phase)	Regionalisation Era c. 4000–2500/2300 BCE (Shaffer) c. 5000–3200 BCE (Coningham & Young)
2800–2600	Harappan 2 (Kot Diji Phase, Nausharo I, Mehrgarh and Vinya VII)	Regionalisation Era c. 4000–2500/2300 BCE (Shaffer) c. 5000–3200 BCE (Coningham & Young)
2600–1900	Mature Harappan (Indus Valley Civilisation)	Integration Era
2600–2450	Harappan 3A (Nausharo II)	Integration Era
2450–2200	Harappan 3B	Integration Era
2200–1900	Harappan 3C	Integration Era
1900–1300	Late Harappan (Cemetery H); Ochre Coloured Pottery	Localisation Era
1900–1700	Harappan 4	Localisation Era
1700–1300	Harappan 5	Localisation Era

== See also ==
- Periodisation of the Indus Valley civilisation
- Iron Age in India
- Indus Valley Civilisation
- Indus script

== Literature ==
- Coningham, Robin; Young, Ruth (2015). The Archaeology of South Asia: From the Indus to Asoka, c. 6500 BCE – 200 CE. Cambridge University Press. ISBN 978-1-316-41898-7.
- Manuel, M. J. (2010). "Chronology and culture-history in the Indus Valley". Sirinimal Lakdusinghe Felicitation Volume. Battaramulla: Neptune. pp. 145–152.
