= Sembanarkoil =

Sembanarkoil ThiruSemPonPalli
- development Town
- Location within Tamil Nadu Location within India
- Coordinates: 11.105592907440872°N 79.73609368666418°E
- Country: India
- State: Tamil Nadu
- District: Mayiladuthurai

Population (2011)
  - Total: 4,200
- Time zone: UTC+05:30 (IST)
- Pincode: 609309
- Vehicle registration: TN-82
- Nearest city: Mayiladuthurai

Sembanarkoil (formerly Semponnarkoil) is a panchayat town in Tharangambadi taluk in Mayiladuthurai district in the Indian state of Tamil Nadu. The town is located in the historic Thanjavur area on the banks of the river Kaveri. Its history is centered around Swarnapureeswarar Temple.

== Geography ==
Sembanarkoil lies on the shores of Bay of Bengal, comprising a coastal plain with a few sand dunes. The Cauvery and its offshoots are the principal rivers.

== Climate ==
=== Temperature ===
The average maximum temperature for the district (from 1991 to 1996) as a whole is about 32 C and the average minimum temperature is 24 C.

=== Wind ===
Dust storms, whirlwinds and dusty winds blow from various quarters towards the end of May. The southwest wind sets in during April. It is strongest in June and continues till September. Cyclones with varying wind velocity arrive every three or four years during November–December. The Northeast monsoon is accompanied by winds that can affect crops, but during Southwest monsoon the air is calm and undisturbed.

=== Rainfall ===
The Northeast monsoon, which starts in October and ends in December, contributes about 60% of the total annual rainfall. The Southwest monsoon rains from June to September and from March to May account equally for the rest. The monthly average rainfall was 108.87 millimetres (4.286 in) in 1991–96.

== Demographics ==
The village is made up of 2079 males and 2121 females.

== Transport ==
Sembanarkoil can be reached by main-line trains and road. From Chennai, it can be reached through the East Coast Road via Puducherry. The nearest railhead is Mayiladuthurai Junction, which hosts direct trains to Chennai, Bangalore, Mysore, Thirupathi, Bombay, Varanasi, Rameswaram, and Coimbatore.

Bus service to nearby towns such as Mayiladuthurai, Thirukkadaiyur, Porayar/Tharangambadi is frequent.

== Economy ==
Agriculture is the main activity, as this is a fertile land. Rice, cotton, black gram, Bengal gram, coconut, banana, and sugarcane are the main products. Because of its location, it has become an important trading and commercial center for nearby villages.

== Education ==
- Kalaimahal College of Education, Sembanarkoil
