= Uppanar River =

River in Tamil Nadu, India

Coordinates: 11.018663°N 79.855439°E

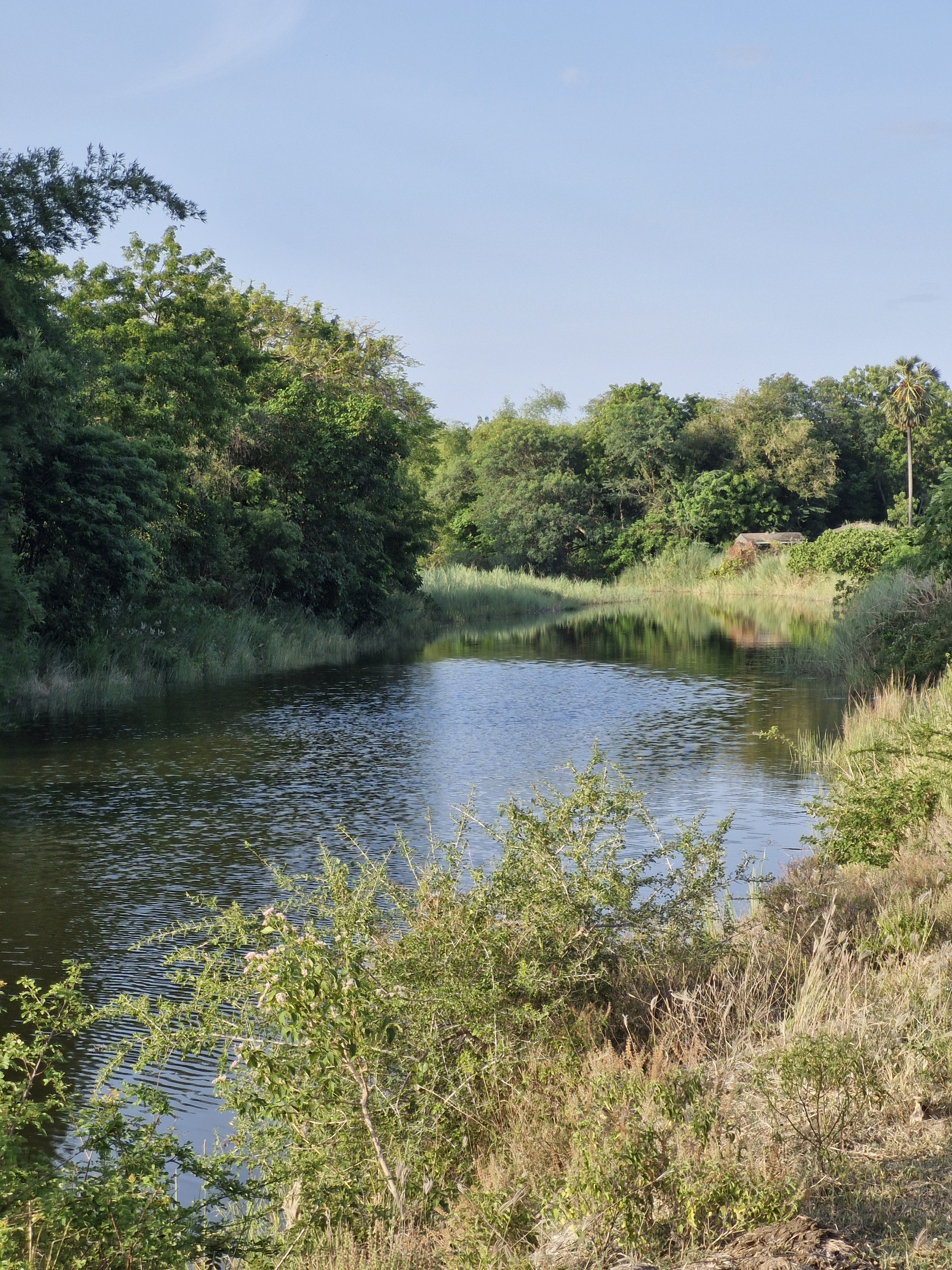
- The Uppanar River near Manganallur Village, Mayiladuthurai district, Tamil Nadu, flowing at the brim in June 2025.
- Native name: உப்பனாறு

Location
- Country: India
- State: Tamil Nadu
- Region: South India
- Origin: Various

Physical characteristics
- Mouth: Bay of Bengal
  - location: Tharangambadi & Cuddalore
  - coordinates
  - elevation: 17.00m
- Length: 70 kilometres (43.5 mi)

The Uppanar River, is a significant distributary of the Cauvery River in flowing through the coastal Sirkazhi and Tharangambadi taluks of Mayiladuthurai district, in the southern state of Tamil Nadu, India.

The Uppanar distributary system includes several engineered branches, often designated as A, B, C, and D in government and hydrological records. The Uppanar Rivers A, C, and D flow through the Mayiladuthurai district, whereas Uppanar River B flows through the Cuddalore district.

It forms part of the Cauvery delta system and supports irrigation, agriculture, and traditional fisheries. Several branches of the river exist, which are largely man-made canals used for irrigation in the delta. The river ultimately drains into the Bay of Bengal.

== Geography and Course ==
=== Uppanar River A ===
The Uppanar River A in Mayiladuthurai district, originates from the main Uppanar canal upstream of the Tharangambadi–Poompuhar region. Its headworks are located near Pallupettai village on the Cauvery canal. A notable nearby feature at the point of divergence is the Vadavar (Vadavaru) canal junction. From its point of origin, the channel flows downstream toward the coastal belt of the Mayiladuthurai district before entering the Bay of Bengal. The river's mouth is situated near Tirumullaivasal in Tharangambadi taluk near Tirumullaivasal Beach.

=== Uppanar River B ===
The Uppanar River B in Cuddalore district originates from the southern outlet of Perumal Lake, located west of Cuddalore town. From its source, the river flows northeast and then parallel to the coastline for much of its lower course, forming part of the district's drainage and estuarine system. The river eventually enters the Bay of Bengal at the Uppanar estuary near Sothikuppam Beach, south of Cuddalore Old Town. The estuary lies within a larger coastal complex where the Uppanar, Gadilam and Paravanar river systems interact.

=== Uppanar River C ===
The Uppanar River C in the Mayiladuthurai district of Tamil Nadu. The branch diverges from the main Uppanar distributary toward the eastern sector, with its headworks located near Thirukadalmallai near Thirukkadaiyur. From its point of origin, the channel flows through Sirkazhi taluk, with landmarks along or near its trace including the Thalai Sanga Nanmathiyam near Akkur, Tharangambadi taluk, which lies several kilometres downstream. The canal is also identifiable near Radhanallur village of Sirkazhi taluk, where its course continues through agricultural areas of the inland delta.

=== Uppanar River D ===
The Uppanar River D in the Mayiladuthurai district, diverges from the main Uppanar distributary slightly north of Tharangambadi, with headworks located near Elanthoppu village. A small sluice gate, locally known as the “Uppanar sluice”, regulates the flow at this point. From its origin, the branch extends inland through agricultural areas of Sirkazhi and Tharangambadi taluks, serving as an intermediate distribution channel within the dense canal network of the Cauvery delta. As with similar tail-end delta canals, it likely terminates by dispersing into agricultural fields or joining smaller lateral channels that eventually feed into coastal wetlands, estuaries, or the Bay of Bengal. The surrounding region includes mangroves, swamps, and seasonal freshwater inflows, with tail-end regulators helping to manage salinity and irrigation distribution.

== Pollution and contamination ==
The Uppanar River C in Cuddalore district, has been heavily affected by industrial pollution, especially from chemical and manufacturing facilities in the SIPCOT industrial area of Cuddalore. The region has been identified by state authorities as a highly polluted area, with widespread contamination of surface water and groundwater.

Industrial effluents have reduced agricultural productivity and affected traditional irrigation channels. Villages such as Eechangadu have reported significant crop losses, forcing many residents to take low-wage jobs in local industries. Fisherfolk have observed a decline in fish diversity; species counts have fallen from around 50 historically to only a few remaining species.

Long-term exposure to pollutants has led to public health issues, including respiratory problems, skin and eye irritation, reproductive health complications, and chronic illnesses. Studies conducted by the National Environmental Engineering Research Institute (NEERI) in 2007 identified 14 types of volatile organic compounds (VOCs) in the area. At the time, about half of the industrial units were temporarily closed, but reopening could increase pollutant loads substantially. Local communities and environmental activists have advocated for stricter regulation, effluent monitoring, and comprehensive epidemiological studies to assess and mitigate health risks.

== See also ==
- List of rivers of Tamil Nadu
