= MelaThirumanancheri Iyravatheswarar Temple =

Hindu temple in Tamil Nadu, India

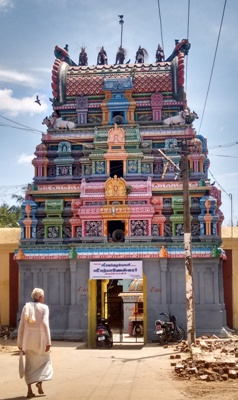
The entrance of the temple

MelaThirumanancheri Iyravatheswarar Temple (மேலைத் திருமணஞ்சேரி ஐராவதேஸ்வரர் கோயில்) is a Hindu temple located at Mela Thirumanancheri in Mayiladuthurai district of Tamil Nadu, India. The historical name of the place is Ethirkolpadi. The presiding deity is Shiva. He is called as Iyravatheswarar. His consort is known as Sugantha Kundalambikai.

== Significance ==
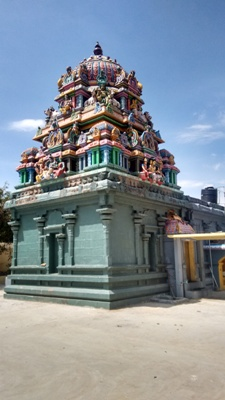
Vimana

It is one of the shrines of the 275 Paadal Petra Sthalams - Shiva Sthalams glorified in the early medieval Tevaram poems by Tamil Saivite Nayanar Sundarar. The temple is counted as one of the temples built on the banks of River Kaveri.
