= Kuthalam block =

Coordinates: 11.1°N 79.55°E

Kuthalam block is a revenue block in the Kuthalam taluk of Mayiladuthurai district, Tamil Nadu, India. There are a total of 51 panchayat villages in this block.
