= Mozhaiyur =

- village
- Country: India
- State: Tamil Nadu
- District: Mayiladuthurai

Languages
  - Official: Tamil
- Time zone: UTC+5:30 (IST)
- Vehicle registration: TN-

Mozhaiyur (also Mozaiyur, Mozhayur) is a village in Mayiladuthurai taluk in the Mayiladuthurai district of Tamil Nadu state, India.

The nearest railway station is at Mayiladuthurai.
