= Sembanar Koil block =

Sembanar Koil block is a revenue block in Mayiladuthurai district, Tamil Nadu, India. There are a total of 57 panchayat villages in this block.
