= Sembiyankandiyur =

Archeological site in India

- Location in Tamil Nadu, India
- 11.0851°N 79.8545°E
- Type: Archaeological site
- Associated with: Neolithic people
- Location: Mayiladuthurai district, Tamil Nadu, India

History
- Built: c. 1500 BC (Neolithic period)

Site notes
- Excavation dates: 2006
- Notable for the discovery of a polished stone celt with Indus script signs, burial urns, and graffiti pottery.

Sembiyankandiyur is an archaeological site in Mayiladuthurai District in Tamil Nadu, India.

== Archaeological excavations ==
=== Excavations in 2006 ===
In early 2006, a polished Neolithic celt (tool) that had engravings resembling the Indus script was found by a school teacher V. Shanmuganathan. The celt, a polished hand-held stone axe, has four Indus Valley signs on it. The artefact with the script was dated to 1500 B.C.

The four signs were identified by epigraphists of the Tamil Nadu Department of Archaeology, according to its Special Commissioner, T. S. Sridhar. Iravatham Mahadevan, one of the world's foremost experts on the Indus script, believed that this discovery was very strong evidence that the Neolithic people of Tamil Nadu and the Indus Valley people "shared the same language, which can only be Dravidian and not Indo-Aryan." He added that before this discovery, the southernmost occurrence of the Indus script was at Daimabad, Maharashtra on the Pravara River in the Godavari Valley. The possibility of the celt coming from North India was also ruled out as the material of this stone was of peninsular origin.

Suggestions that the Indus script were used to record a language are disputed. It is not clear if these symbols constitute a script used to record a language, and the subject of whether the Indus symbols were a writing system is controversial. In spite of many attempts at decipherment, it is undeciphered, and no underlying language has been identified. There is no known bilingual inscription. The script does not show any significant changes over time.

The discovery of this celt caused a stir in archaeological circles. Subsequently, the Archaeological Survey of India decided to excavate the Sembiyankandiyur site to find out its antiquity and fix the chronology.

Four trenches were laid at the place where the celt with the engravings were found. Important findings from the trenches were bowls, dishes, broken urns, full-size urns and other articles. Eight urns were found to be aligned in a particular manner, three of them with human bones. Some urns had ritual pots inside. Some pots and sherds have thumb-nail impressions on them.

Full-shape pots had the graffiti depicting a fish, a ‘damaru’, sun, star and a swastika. Geometric designs and marks depicting fish, sun and star and graffiti marks are often found on black-and-red ware and black ware, with the symbols sometimes repeated.

=== Excavations in 2008 ===
During excavations by the ASI in April–May 2008, megalithic pottery with graffiti symbols that have a strong resemblance to a sign in the Indus script were found.

Iravatham Mahadevan says that what is striking about the arrow-mark graffiti on the megalithic pottery found at Sembiyankandiyur and Melaperumpallam villages is that they are always incised twice and together, just as they are in the Indus script.

ASI had previously found several pots at Melaperumpallam near Poompuhar during an excavation. Some of these had the same arrow-like symbol occurring twice on them, and always adjacent to each other.

According to Mr. Mahadevan, seals unearthed at Mohenjodaro (now in Pakistan) in the 1920s have similar arrow-like signs that also occur twice and always together. There are several seals with the Indus script and engravings of a bull or a unicorn where the arrow-like sign always occurs in pairs.

While the megalithic/Iron Age pottery in Tamil Nadu is datable between the third century B.C. and third century A.D., the Indus script belongs to the period 2600 B.C. to 1900 B.C. of the mature Harappan period.
