= Thirumanancheri =

Village in Tamil Nadu, India

Thirumanancheri is a village located near Cauvery River in Mayiladuthurai district.
