= Sirkazhi block =

Sirkazhi block is a revenue block in Sirkazhi taluk of Mayiladuthurai district, Tamil Nadu, India. There are a total of 37 panchayat villages in this block.
