= Poompuhar Assembly constituency =

One of the 234 State Legislative Assembly Constituencies in Tamil Nadu, in India

Coordinates: 11.15°N 79.85°E

Poompuhar
- Constituency No. 162 for the Tamil Nadu Legislative Assembly

Constituency details
- Country: India
- Region: South India
- State: Tamil Nadu
- District: Mayiladuthurai
- Lok Sabha constituency: Mayiladuthurai
- Established: 1977
- Total electors: 259,332
- Reservation: None

Member of Legislative Assembly
- 17th Tamil Nadu Legislative Assembly
- Incumbent Nivedha M Murugan
- Party: DMK
- Elected year: 2026

Poompuhar is a state assembly constituency in Mayiladuthurai district in Tamil Nadu. It is one of the 234 State Legislative Assembly Constituencies in Tamil Nadu, in India. Elections and winners from this constituency are listed below.

== Members of the Legislative Assembly ==
Election	Name	Party
1977	S. Ganesan	Dravida Munnetra Kazhagam
1980	N. Vijayabalan	All India Anna Dravida Munnetra Kazhagam
1984	N. Vijayabalan	All India Anna Dravida Munnetra Kazhagam
1989	M. Mohammad Siddik	Dravida Munnetra Kazhagam
1991	M. Poorasamy	All India Anna Dravida Munnetra Kazhagam
1996	G. Mohandasan	Dravida Munnetra Kazhagam
2001	N. Renganathan	All India Anna Dravida Munnetra Kazhagam
2006	K. Periyasamy	Pattali Makkal Katchi
2011	S. Pavunraj	All India Anna Dravida Munnetra Kazhagam
2016	S. Pavunraj	All India Anna Dravida Munnetra Kazhagam
2021	Nivedha M. Murugan	Dravida Munnetra Kazhagam
2026	Nivedha M. Murugan	Dravida Munnetra Kazhagam

== Election results ==
Vote share of winning candidates
2026	36.98%
2021	46.40%
2016	45.48%
2011	50.66%
2006	46.14%
2001	50.55%
1996	49.88%
1991	53.47%
1989	47.33%
1984	50.22%
1980	53.36%
1977	44.95%

=== 2026 ===
2026 Tamil Nadu Legislative Assembly election: Poompuhar
Party	Candidate	Votes	%	±%
DMK	Nivedha M Murugan	81,096	36.98	▼9.42
AIADMK	Pavunraj.S	72,836	33.21	▼11.60
TVK	Vijayalaiyan.J	55,902	25.49	New
NTK	Ilayanagulan.K	6,353	2.90	▼4.26
NOTA	NOTA	586	0.27	
Margin of victory		8,260	3.77	▲2.18
Turnout		2,19,324	84.57	▲9.48
Registered electors		2,59,332		▼16,495
DMK hold		Swing	▼9.42	

=== 2021 ===
2021 Tamil Nadu Legislative Assembly election: Poompuhar
Party	Candidate	Votes	%	±%
DMK	Nivedha M. Murugan	96,102	46.40%	New
AIADMK	S. Pavunraj	92,803	44.81%	−0.67
NTK	P. Kaliyammal	14,823	7.16%	+6.15
AMMK	S. Senthamizhan	1,220	0.59%	New
Margin of victory		3,299	1.59%	−8.75%
Turnout		207,105	75.09%	−0.56%
Rejected ballots		122	0.06%	
Registered electors		275,827		
DMK gain from AIADMK		Swing	0.92%	

=== 2016 ===
2016 Tamil Nadu Legislative Assembly election: Poompuhar
Party	Candidate	Votes	%	±%
AIADMK	S. Pavunraj	87,666	45.48%	−5.18
IUML	A. M. Shajahan	67,731	35.14%	New
PMK	R. Anbalagan	16,241	8.43%	−35.52
TMC(M)	M. Sankar	14,806	7.68%	New
NTK	S. Kaliyaperumal	1,946	1.01%	New
NOTA	NOTA	1,478	0.77%	New
Margin of victory		19,935	10.34%	3.63%
Turnout		192,758	75.64%	−4.25%
Registered electors		254,828		
AIADMK hold		Swing	-5.18%	

=== 2011 ===
2011 Tamil Nadu Legislative Assembly election: Poompuhar
Party	Candidate	Votes	%	±%
AIADMK	S. Pavunraj	85,839	50.66%	+5.32
PMK	K. Agoram	74,466	43.94%	−2.2
SDPI	M. Y. Mohamed Tharik	2,984	1.76%	New
BJP	R. Balasubramanian	2,091	1.23%	+0.35
Independent	M. Dhakshinamoorthy	1,326	0.78%	New
IJK	S. Ramakrishnan	1,237	0.73%	New
Margin of victory		11,373	6.71%	5.91%
Turnout		169,457	79.89%	5.60%
Registered electors		212,106		
AIADMK gain from PMK		Swing	4.52%	

=== 2006 ===
2006 Tamil Nadu Legislative Assembly election: Poompuhar
Party	Candidate	Votes	%	±%
PMK	K. Periyasamy	55,375	46.14%	New
AIADMK	S. Pavunraj	54,411	45.34%	−5.21
SP	M. Maya Venkatesan	3,328	2.77%	New
DMDK	V. R. Prabakaran	2,395	2.00%	New
BJP	K. A. Krishnamoorthy	1,062	0.88%	New
Independent	Mari. Vengatesan	852	0.71%	New
Independent	K. Balakrishnan	803	0.67%	New
IJP	A. Karunanithi	626	0.52%	New
Margin of victory		964	0.80%	−6.21%
Turnout		120,015	74.29%	7.25%
Registered electors		161,553		
PMK gain from AIADMK		Swing	-4.41%	

=== 2001 ===
2001 Tamil Nadu Legislative Assembly election: Poompuhar
Party	Candidate	Votes	%	±%
AIADMK	N. Renganathan	53,760	50.55%	+18.58
DMK	M. Mohammed Siddiq	46,305	43.54%	−6.34
MDMK	S. M. Musahudeen	3,542	3.33%	−8.56
Independent	K. S. Raja Alias Kannadasan	1,679	1.58%	New
MNK(PLP)	T. V. Sampath	1,067	1.00%	New
Margin of victory		7,455	7.01%	−10.90%
Turnout		106,353	67.03%	−6.39%
Registered electors		158,741		
AIADMK gain from DMK		Swing	0.67%	

=== 1996 ===
1996 Tamil Nadu Legislative Assembly election: Poompuhar
Party	Candidate	Votes	%	±%
DMK	G. Mohandasan	51,285	49.88%	+16.14
AIADMK	N. Vijayabalan	32,872	31.97%	−21.51
MDMK	S. M. Samsudeen	12,222	11.89%	New
PMK	D. Gubendra Gunabalan	5,682	5.53%	New
Margin of victory		18,413	17.91%	−1.83%
Turnout		102,827	73.42%	2.18%
Registered electors		148,327		
DMK gain from AIADMK		Swing	-3.60%	

=== 1991 ===
1991 Tamil Nadu Legislative Assembly election: Poompuhar
Party	Candidate	Votes	%	±%
AIADMK	M. Poorasamy	52,478	53.47%	+33.87
DMK	M. Mohamed Siddik	33,107	33.74%	−13.6
PMK	G. Sugumar	11,371	11.59%	New
AMI	C. Selvanathan	1,180	1.20%	New
Margin of victory		19,371	19.74%	−7.99%
Turnout		98,136	71.24%	4.13%
Registered electors		143,688		
AIADMK gain from DMK		Swing	6.14%	

=== 1989 ===
1989 Tamil Nadu Legislative Assembly election: Poompuhar
Party	Candidate	Votes	%	±%
DMK	M. Mohamed Siddik	40,657	47.33%	+0.56
AIADMK	R. Rajamannar	16,839	19.60%	−30.62
AIADMK	N. Vijayabalan	13,793	16.06%	−34.16
Independent	M. A. Jamal Mohieen Papa	13,425	15.63%	New
Independent	N. Renganathan	730	0.85%	New
Margin of victory		23,818	27.73%	24.28%
Turnout		85,897	67.11%	−14.09%
Registered electors		130,542		
DMK gain from AIADMK		Swing	-2.89%	

=== 1984 ===
1984 Tamil Nadu Legislative Assembly election: Poompuhar
Party	Candidate	Votes	%	±%
AIADMK	N. Vijayabalan	44,860	50.22%	−3.14
DMK	Jama Imoideen Papa	41,780	46.77%	+0.13
Independent	S. Peterraj	1,415	1.58%	New
Margin of victory		3,080	3.45%	−3.27%
Turnout		89,328	81.20%	2.51%
Registered electors		115,057		
AIADMK hold		Swing	-3.14%	

=== 1980 ===
1980 Tamil Nadu Legislative Assembly election: Poompuhar
Party	Candidate	Votes	%	±%
AIADMK	N. Vijayabalan	45,292	53.36%	New
DMK	S. Ganesan	39,587	46.64%	+1.69
Margin of victory		5,705	6.72%	−5.93%
Turnout		84,879	78.69%	6.88%
Registered electors		109,786		
AIADMK gain from DMK		Swing	8.41%	

=== 1977 ===
1977 Tamil Nadu Legislative Assembly election: Poompuhar
Party	Candidate	Votes	%	±%
DMK	S. Ganesan	34,105	44.95%	New
CPI(M)	G. Bharathi Mohan	24,508	32.30%	New
INC	P. Ethiraj	9,662	12.73%	New
JP	K. K. Deen	7,605	10.02%	New
Margin of victory		9,597	12.65%	
Turnout		75,880	71.81%	
Registered electors		107,361		
DMK win (new seat)				
