= Tirukozhambiam Kokileswarar Temple =

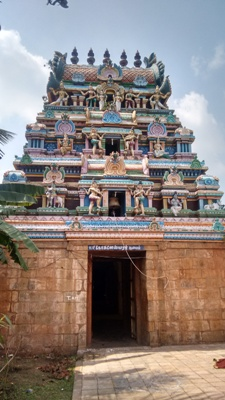
Gopura

Tirukozhambiam Kokileswarar Temple (திருக்கோழம்பியம் கோகிலேஸ்வரர் கோயில்) is a Hindu temple located at Thanjavur district of Tamil Nadu, India. The presiding deity is Shiva. He is called as Kokileswarar. His consort is Soundara Nayaki.

== Significance ==
It is one of the 275 Paadal Petra Sthalams - Shiva Sthalams glorified in the early medieval Tevaram poems by Tamil Saivite Nayanar saints Tirunavukkarasar and Thirugnana Sambandar.

== Legend ==
According to Hindu legend, a person named Chandan was reborn as a nightingale (kokila) due to the curse of Indra. He meditated upon Shiva and reassumed his original form here. As per another legend, when a cow passed through the place, its feet trampled on a Sivalinga, which became this place.

== Features ==
The main idol is a shivalinga. There are the footprints of a cow upon the shivalinga. The temple is under the administration of the Thiruvaduthurai Adheenam. The temple is counted as one of the temples built on the banks of River Kaveri.

== Gallery ==
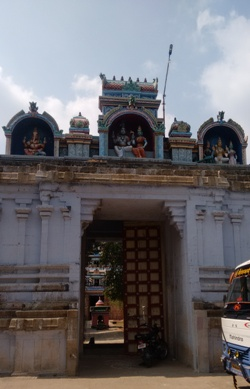
Main entrance

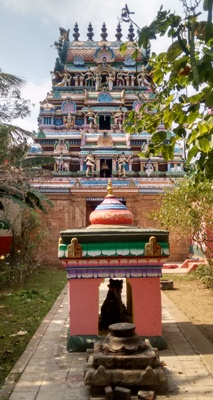
Balipeetam, nandi mandapam

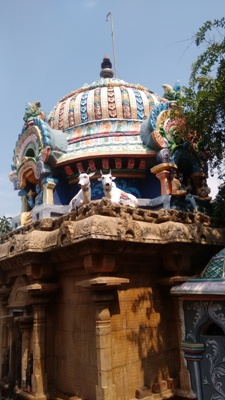
Vimana of presiding deity

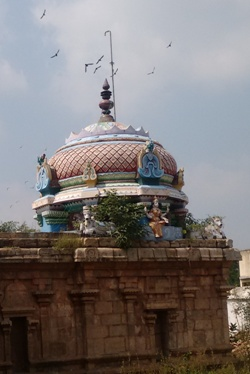
Vimana of goddess
