= G. Mohandasan =

Indian politician

G. Mohandasan, also spelled as G. Mohanadasan, is an Indian politician and former Member of the Legislative Assembly of Tamil Nadu. He was elected to the Tamil Nadu Legislative Assembly as a Dravida Munnetra Kazhagam candidate from Poompuhar constituency in the 1996 election.
