= Kuthalam =

Kuthalam Kuttalam
- Town
- Location in Tamil Nadu, India
- Coordinates: 11.1°N 79.55°E
- Country: India
- State: Tamil Nadu
- District: Mayiladuthurai

Population (2001)
  - Total: 13,434

Languages
  - Official: Tamil
- Time zone: UTC+5:30 (IST)
- PIN: 609 801
- Telephone code: 91 4364
- Vehicle registration: TN-82

Kuthalam (also known as Tiruthuruthi) is a panchayat town and Taluk in Mayiladuthurai district in the Indian state of Tamil Nadu. The language being spoken is Tamil. Kutthalam is located at the distance of 285 km from Chennai, 13 km from Mayladuthurai and 24 km from Kumbakonam.

== Demographics ==
As of the 2011 India census, Kuthalam had a population of 115,823. Males constitute 50% of the population and females 50%. Kuthalam has an average literacy rate of 73%, higher than the national average of 59.5%: male literacy is 82%, and female literacy is 64%. In Kuthalam, 11% of the population is under 6 years of age. Kuthalam town is divided into 15 wards for which elections are held every 5 years.

== See also ==
- Uthavedeeswarar Temple
