= K. Periyasamy =

Indian politician

K. Periyasamy was elected to the Tamil Nadu Legislative Assembly from the Poompuhar constituency in the 2006 elections. He was a candidate of the Pattali Makkal Katchi (PMK) party.
