= Nivedha M. Murugan =

Indian politician

Member of the Tamil Nadu Legislative Assembly
- Incumbent
- Assumed office 12 May 2021
- Preceded by: S. Pavunraj
- Constituency: Poompuhar

Personal details
- Party: Dravida Munnetra Kazhagam

Nivedha M. Murugan is an Indian politician who is a Member of Legislative Assembly of Tamil Nadu. He was elected from Poompuhar as a Dravida Munnetra Kazhagam candidate in 2021.

== Elections contested ==
Election	Constituency	Party	Result	Vote %	Runner-up	Runner-up Party	Runner-up vote %
2021 Tamil Nadu Legislative Assembly election	Poompuhar	DMK	Won	46.40%	S. Pavunraj	ADMK	44.81%
