= Mayiladuthurai taluk =

Coordinates: 11°06′07″N 79°34′47″E

Mayiladuthurai taluk is a taluk of Mayiladuthurai district of the Indian state of Tamil Nadu. The headquarters of the district is the town of Mayiladuthurai and villages include Agarakkirangudi, Elanthangudi and Mozhaiyur.

== Demographics ==
According to the 2011 census, the taluk of Mayiladuthurai had a population of 259,446 with 128,169 males and 131,277 females. There were 1,024 women for every 1,000 men. The taluk had a literacy rate of 78.78%. Child population in the age group below 6 was 11,659 Males and 11,454 Females.
