= Mayiladuthurai district =

- District of Tamil Nadu
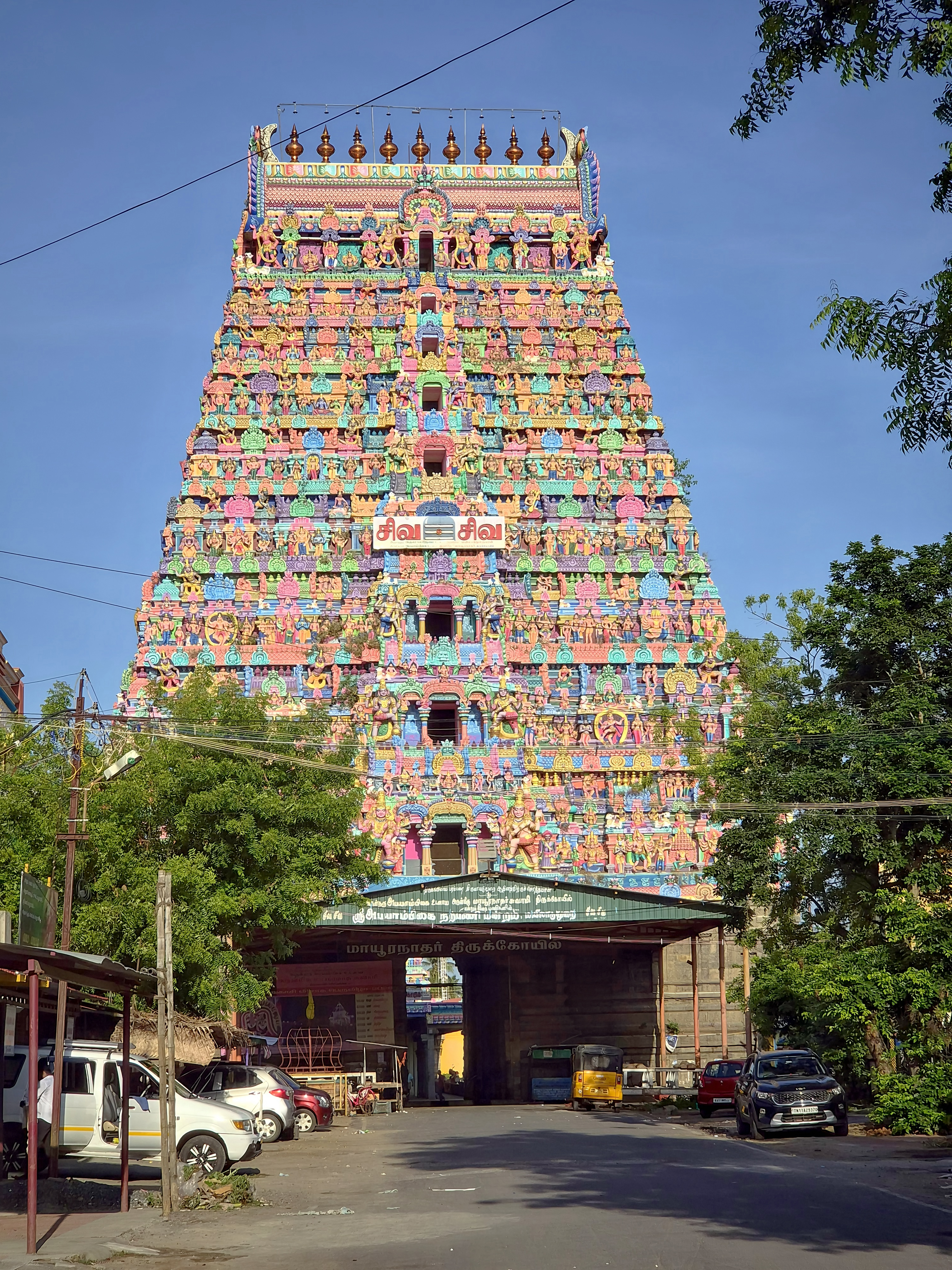
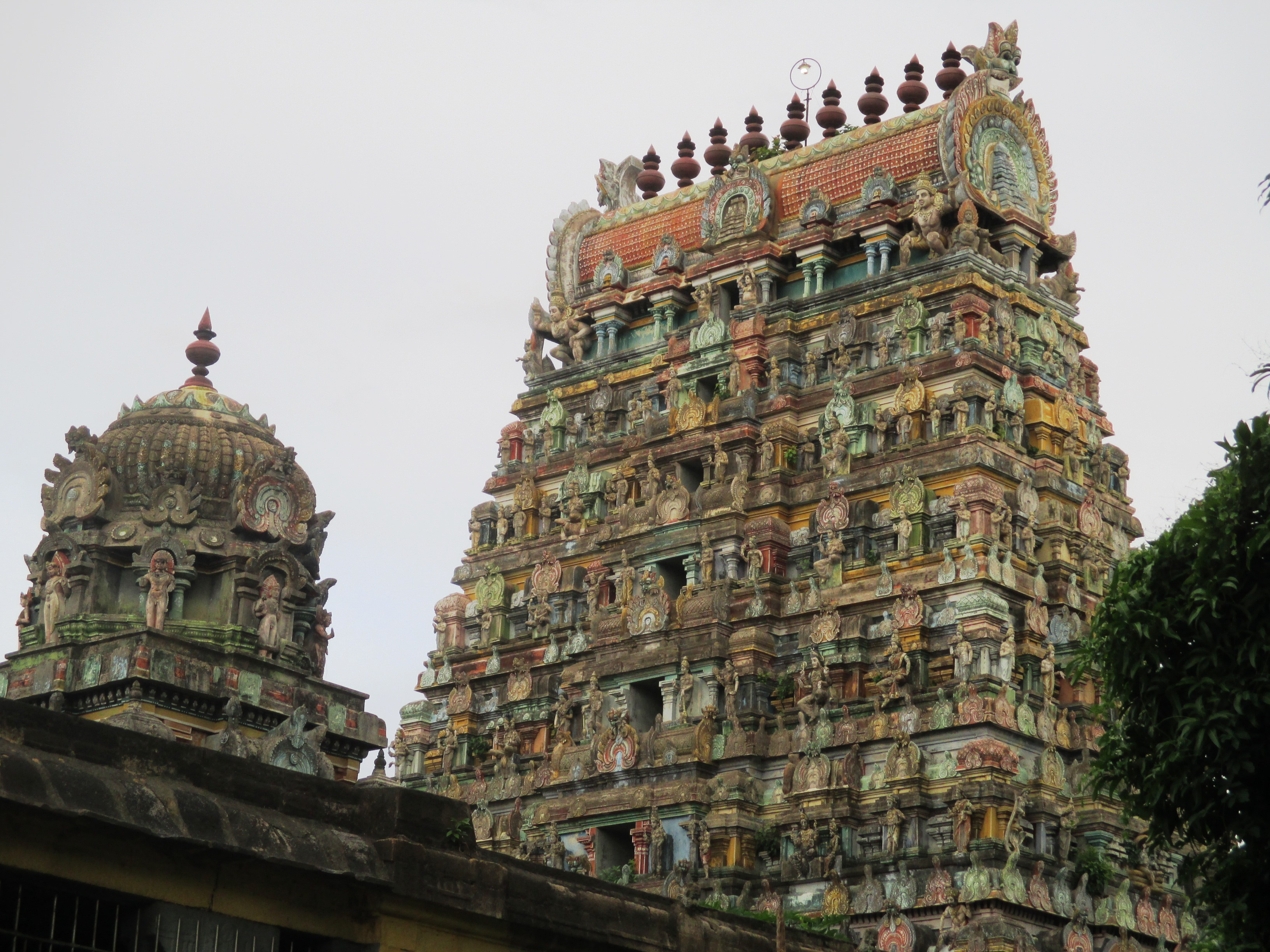
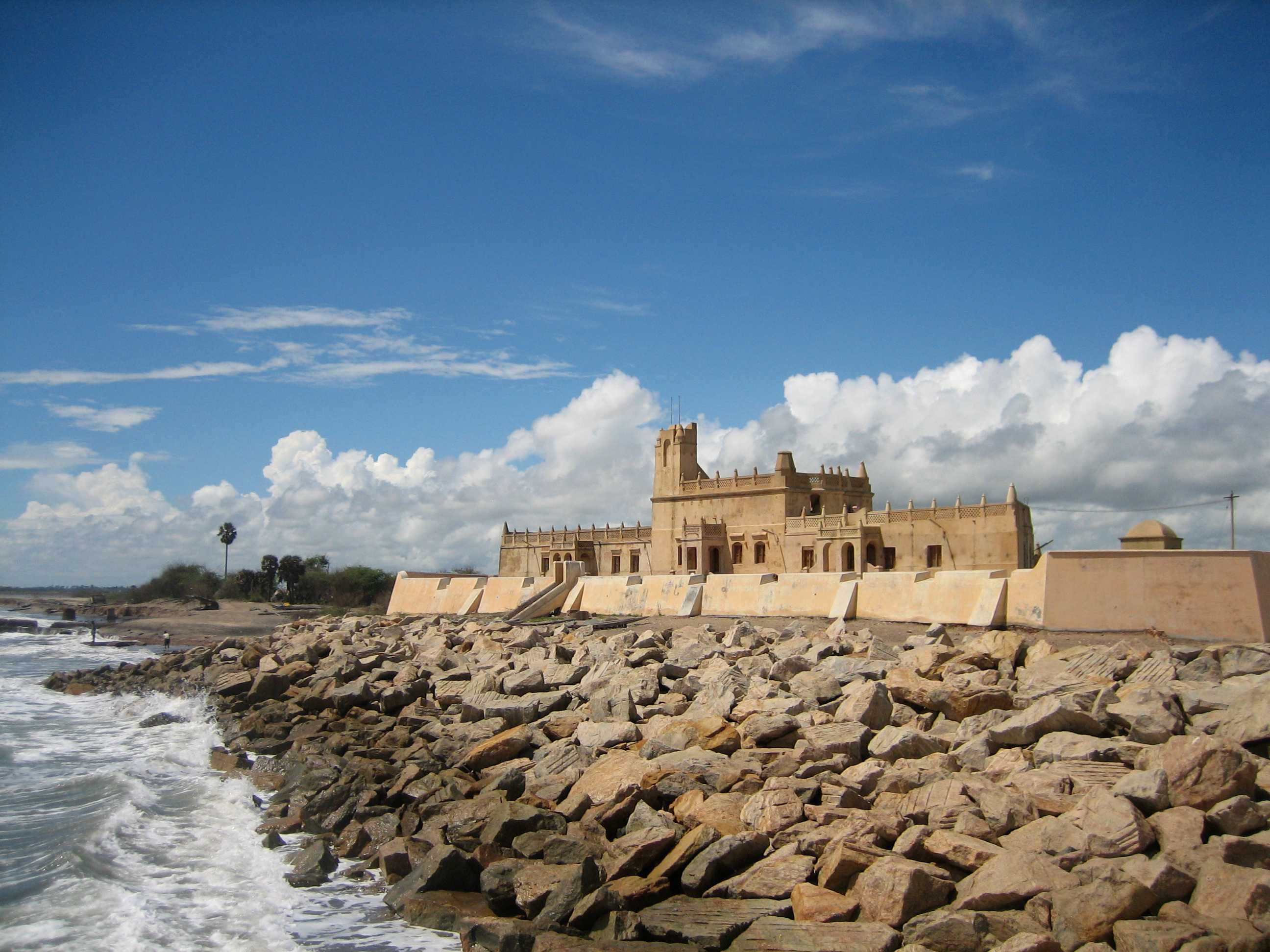
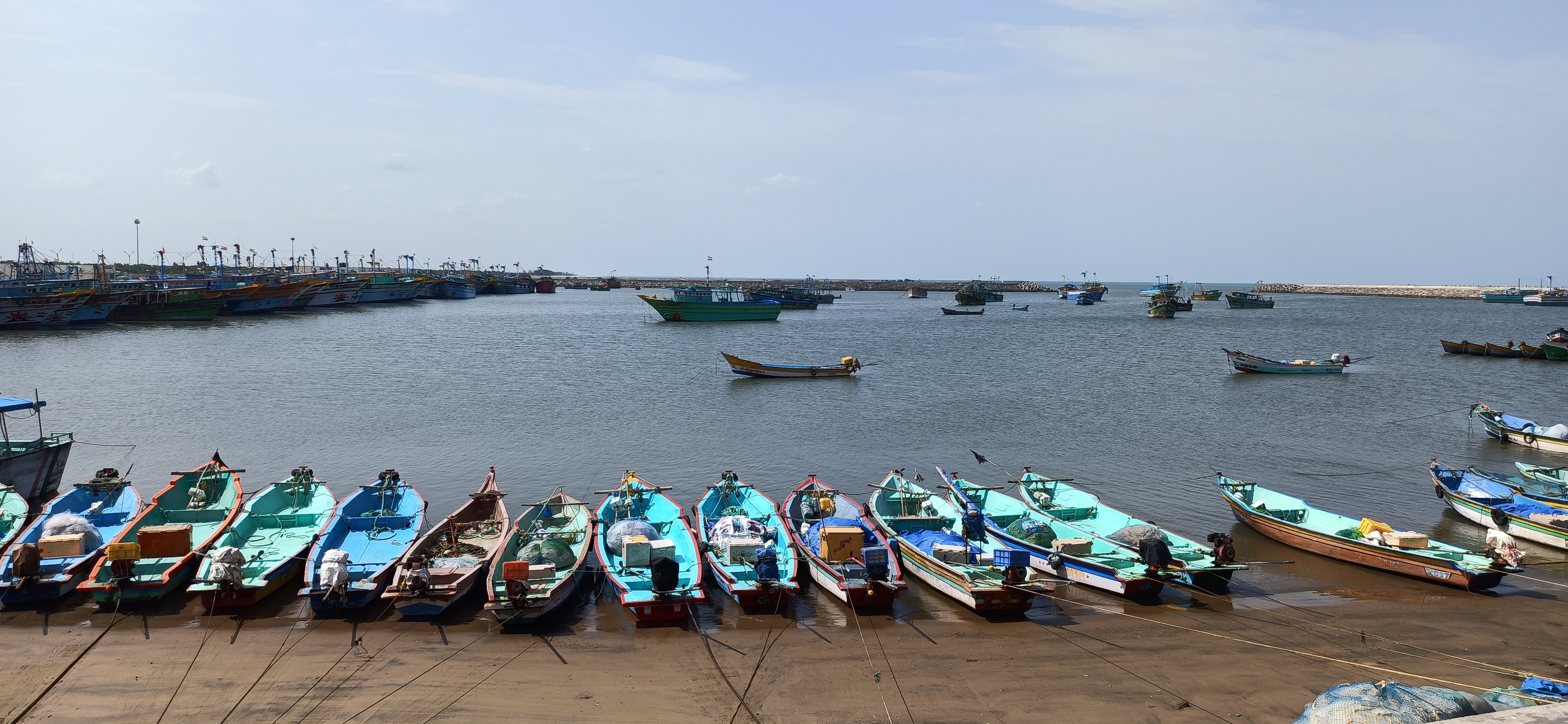
- Clockwise from top left: Mayuranathaswami Temple; Sattainathar Temple in Sirkazhi; Dansborg Fort in Tharangambadi; and boats in Poompuhar harbour
- Interactive map of Mayiladuthurai district
- Coordinates: 11°06′06″N 79°40′54″E
- Country: India
- State: Tamil Nadu
- Established: 28 December 2020
- Founder: Edappadi K. Palaniswami
- Headquarters: Mayiladuthurai
- Taluks: Kuthalam, Mayiladuthurai, Sirkali, Tharangambadi, Kollidam; Sembanarkoil

Government
  - District Collector: H. S. Srikanth, IAS
  - Superintendent of Police: G.Stalin,

Area
  - District of Tamil Nadu: 1,169 km^{2} (451 sq mi)
  - Urban: 68 km^{2} (26 sq mi)
  - Rural: 1,101 km^{2} (425 sq mi)
  - Rank: 37
- Elevation: 13 m (43 ft)

Population (2011)
  - District of Tamil Nadu: 918,356
  - Estimate (2025): 913,149
  - Rank: 34
  - Density: 785/km^{2} (2,030/sq mi)

Languages
  - Official: Tamil
- Time zone: UTC+5:30 (IST)
- PIN: 609001
- Telephone Code: +91- 4364
- Vehicle registration: TN 82
- Website: mayiladuthurai.nic.in

Mayiladuthurai district is an administrative district in the Indian state of Tamil Nadu. It was formed in 2020 by the division the Nagapattinam district. The district is named after its headquarters, Mayiladuthurai. It is situated in the Cauvery Delta region.

== Geography ==
Mayiladuthurai district is located in the fertile delta region of the Kaveri River. It is surrounded by the Cuddalore district to the north, Thanjavur district to the west, and Tiruvarur district and Karaikal district of Puducherry to the south, with the Bay of Bengal forming its eastern boundary. The district is characterized by its flat terrain and is crisscrossed by numerous distributaries of the Kaveri River, which support extensive agricultural activity. The Kollidam River defines much of its northern border with Cuddalore district. The district is drained by rivers such as the Cauvery, Kollidam, Veera Chozhan, and Uppanar.

The district's geological formation consists of sedimentary rocks, including alluvial, sandy loam, and sandy clay loam.

The district has a coastal length of around 70.9 kilometres (44.1 mi), from Tharangambadi to Pazhaiyar along the coast of Bay of Bengal.

The total area of the district is 1,169.30 square kilometres (451.47 sq mi), accounting for 0.90% of the area of the state.

== History ==
Mayiladuthurai, historically known as Mayavaram, Mayuram or Mayurapuram, has a long-standing cultural and religious history dating back over a thousand years and was part of the ancient Chola Kingdom. The town is mentioned in ancient Tamil literature and inscriptions.

The district has evidence of Neolithic settlement in the region dating back to the 3rd millennium BCE, supported by archaeological discoveries, including artifacts bearing Indus Valley signs unearthed in 2006 at Sembiyankandiyur, dating between 2000 and 1500 BCE.

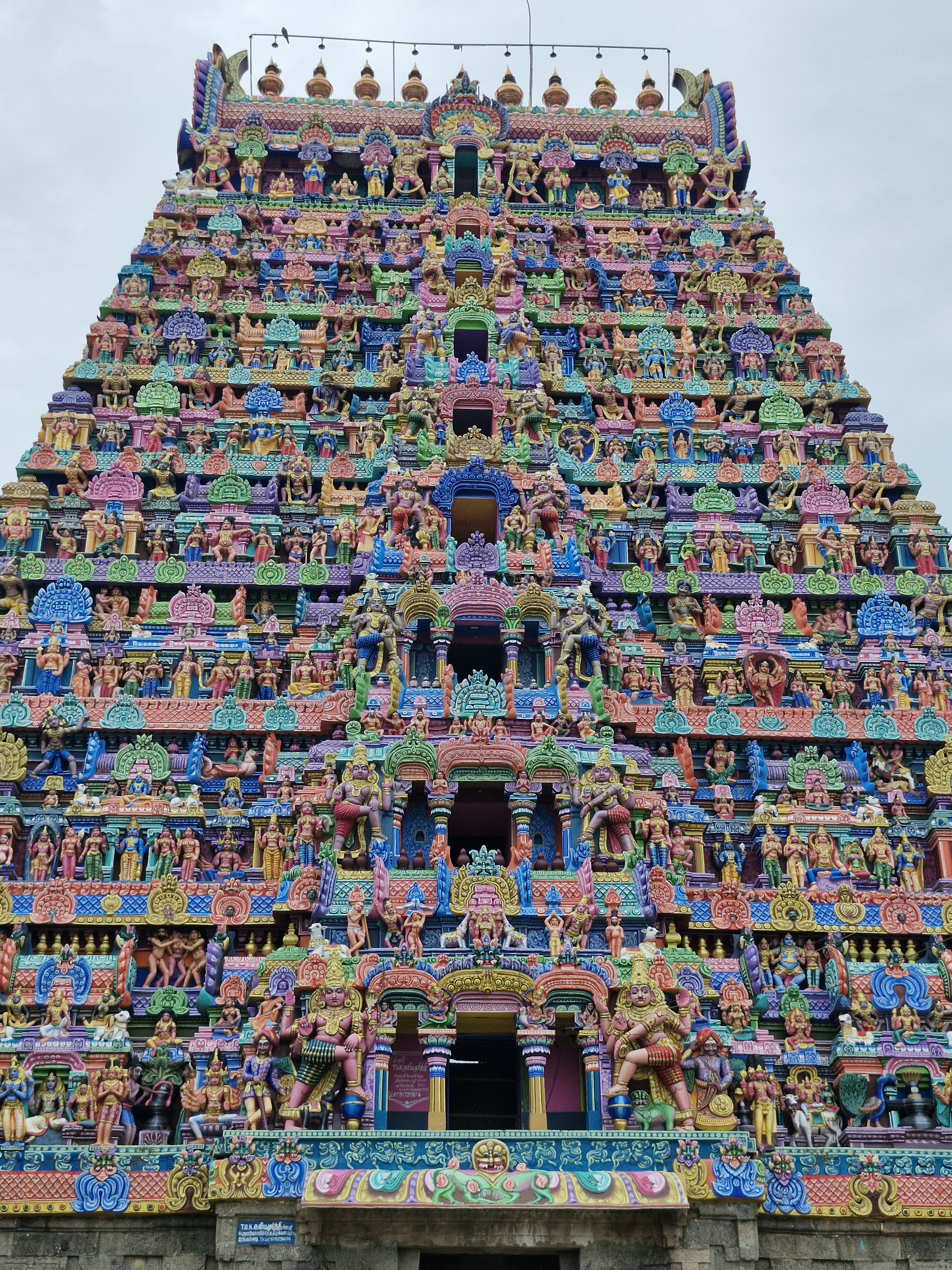
Gopuram of the Mayuranathaswamy temple

The district has 1,383 shrines maintained by Tamil Nadu government, and is home to several historically significant temples, including:

- Mayuranathaswami temple to Shiva
- Parimala Ranganatha Perumal temple, dedicated to Lo Vishnu
- Vaitheeswaran Koil, dedicated to Vaidyanathar (Hindu god of healing and divine physician) and his consort Thaiyal Nayagi (the Mother who can sew up wounds)
- Amritaghateswarar-Abirami temple, dedicated to Shiva and Parvati as Abhirami, known for couples who have celebrated their Shastiapthapoorthi (completion of 60 years) and Sadhabishekam (completion of 80 years) for the married couples.
- Udhvaganathar temple in Thirumanancheri
- Sattainathar temple in Sirkazhi

The region was ruled by various dynasties, including the Cholas, Pandyas, and Vijayanagaras, each leaving their mark on the culture and architecture of the area. During the British colonial period, Mayiladuthurai became an important administrative and commercial center in the Madras Presidency.

The district was part of Thanjavur district until 1991 when it became part of Nagapattinam district. Its status as an independent district was formalized in 2020. Mayiladuthurai has been a significant center for Tamil literature, music, and spirituality; and local literary luminaries such as Kambar and Kalki Krishnamurthy have contributed to its cultural legacy.

Mayiladuthurai district has historical associations with Mahatma Gandhi's travels. On 1 May 1915 Gandhi visited the village Porayar and several parts of the town during his campaigns. Thillaiyadi Valliammai, who accompanied Gandhi in South Africa and assisted those affected by racial discrimination, is commemorated by a memorial erected by the government of Tamil Nadu in recognition of her activities.

Poombuhar, also known as Kaveripoompattinam, is an ancient port city in Tamil Nadu located near Mayiladuthurai town. It is noted in Sangam literature and has been identified as a historical trade center associated with the maritime activity of the early Chola dynasty. A copper-plate land-grant charter inscription, issued during the reigns of Rajadhiraja Chola I and his younger brother Rajendra Chola II, was discovered on 20 May 2010 at Kazhukani Muttam, a hamlet of Thiruvilandur, Mayiladuthurai. The Thiruvilandur plates provide information on the Chola state in the mid-11th century, including the establishment of a Brahmadeya, a tax-free settlement, and the administration of land, taxation, irrigation, local assemblies and land grants.

== Demographics ==
Religions in Mayiladuthurai district (2011)
Religion	Percent
Hindu	89.37%
Muslim	7.21%
Christian	3.13%
Other or not stated	0.29%
Distribution of religions

At the time of the 2011 census, Mayiladuthurai district had a population of 918,356, of which 176,568 (19.23%) lived in urban areas. Mayiladuthurai district has a sex ratio of 1029 females per 1000 males and Scheduled Castes and Scheduled Tribes made up 32.31% and 0.23% of the population respectively. Tamil is the predominant language, spoken by 99.32% of the population. The estimated population for 2026 is 910,673.

== Local administration ==
The district is divided into two revenue divisions, Mayiladuthurai and Sirkazhi, encompassing four taluks:

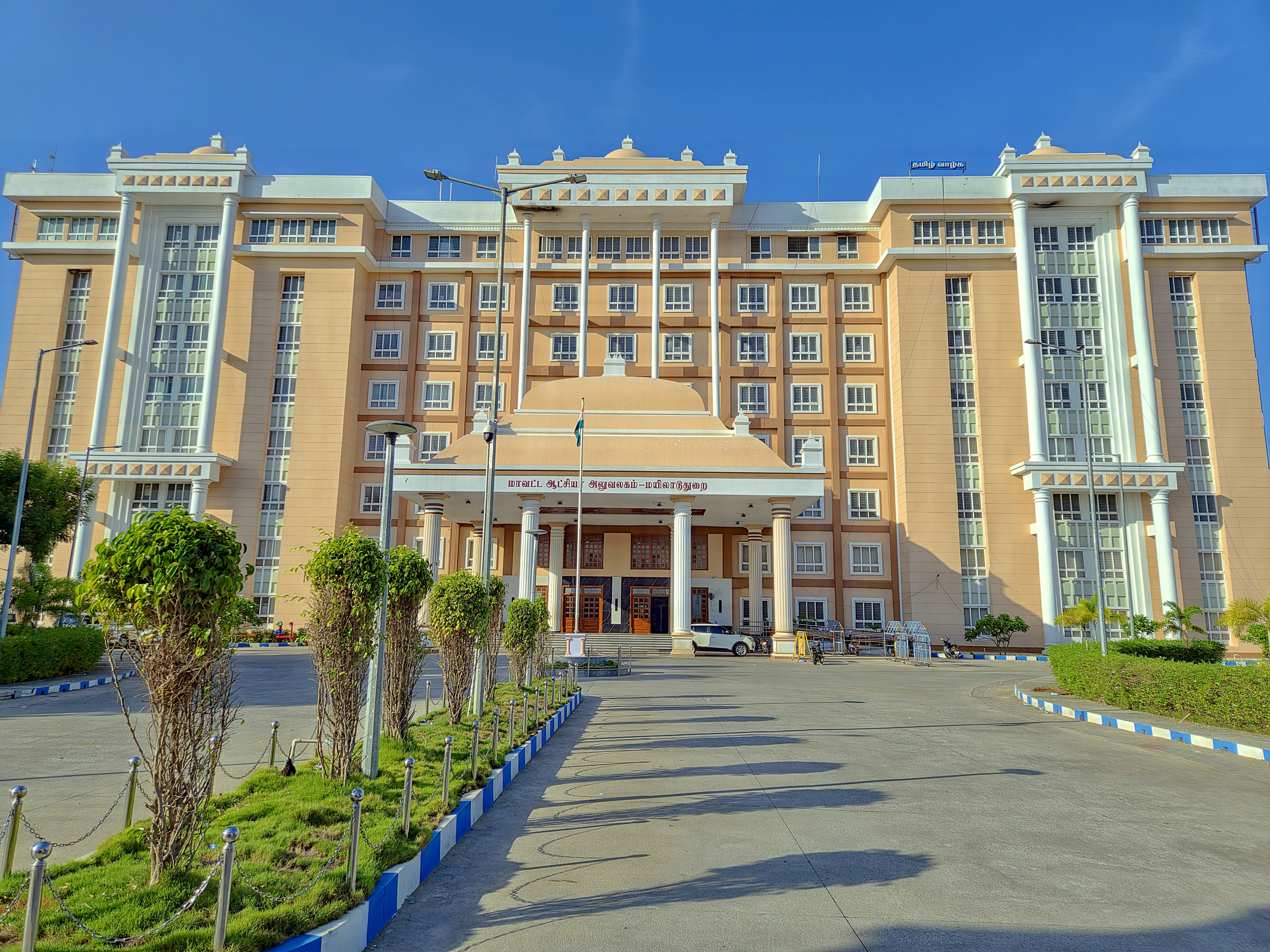
- District Collector office
  Kuthalam taluk
- Mayiladuthurai taluk
- Sirkazhi/Sirkali taluk
- Tharangambadi taluk

The district has five blocks, namely Mayiladuthurai, Kuthalam, Sirkazhi, Kollidam, and Sembanarkoil, which comprise 287 revenue village panchayats. There are two municipalities, which are Mayiladuthurai and Sirkazhi, and four town panchayats, viz. Manalmedu, Vaitheeswarankoil, Kuthalam, and Tharangambadi.

The district administration is headed by a district collector, with various departments including revenue, agriculture, and social welfare operational within its jurisdiction.

== Legislative representation ==
=== Tamil Nadu Assembly ===
District	No.	Constituency	Name	Party	Alliance	Remarks
Mayiladuthurai	160	Sirkazhi (SC)	R. Senthilselvan	DMK	SPA	
Mayiladuthurai	161	Mayiladuthurai	Jamal Mohamed Younoos	INC	TVK+	Won as SPA candidate; party switched to TVK+ post-election
Mayiladuthurai	162	Poompuhar	Nivedha M. Murugan	DMK	SPA	

=== Lok Sabha ===
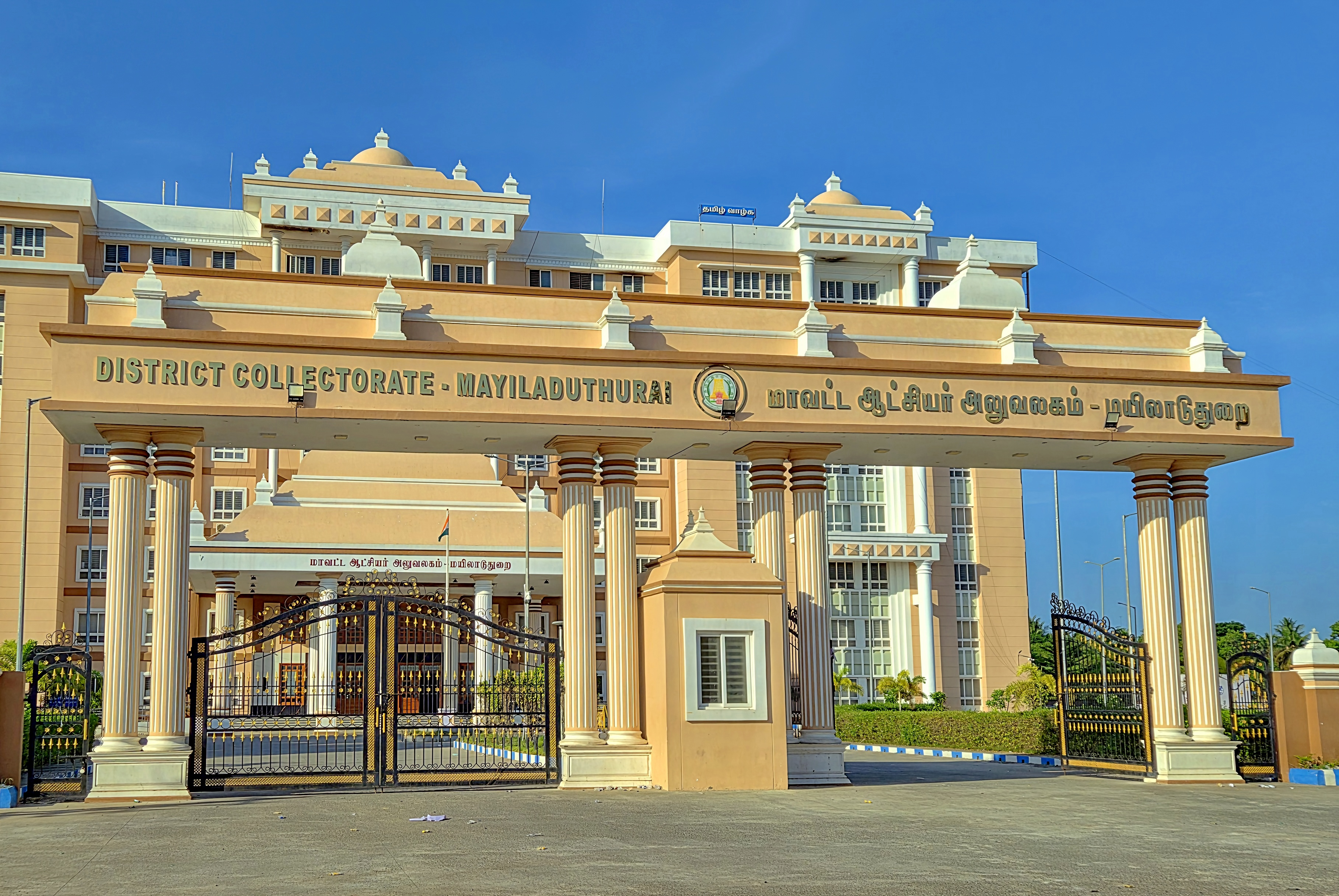
Entrance Arch - District collector office

The Mayiladuthurai district is part of the Mayiladuthurai Lok Sabha constituency. The current Member of Parliament is Sudha Ramakrishnan of the Indian National Congress, who was elected in 2024.

Constituency	MP	Party
Mayiladuthurai Lok Sabha	Sudha Ramakrishnan	Indian National Congress

== Education ==
The district has a history in the education sector spanning over 500 years.

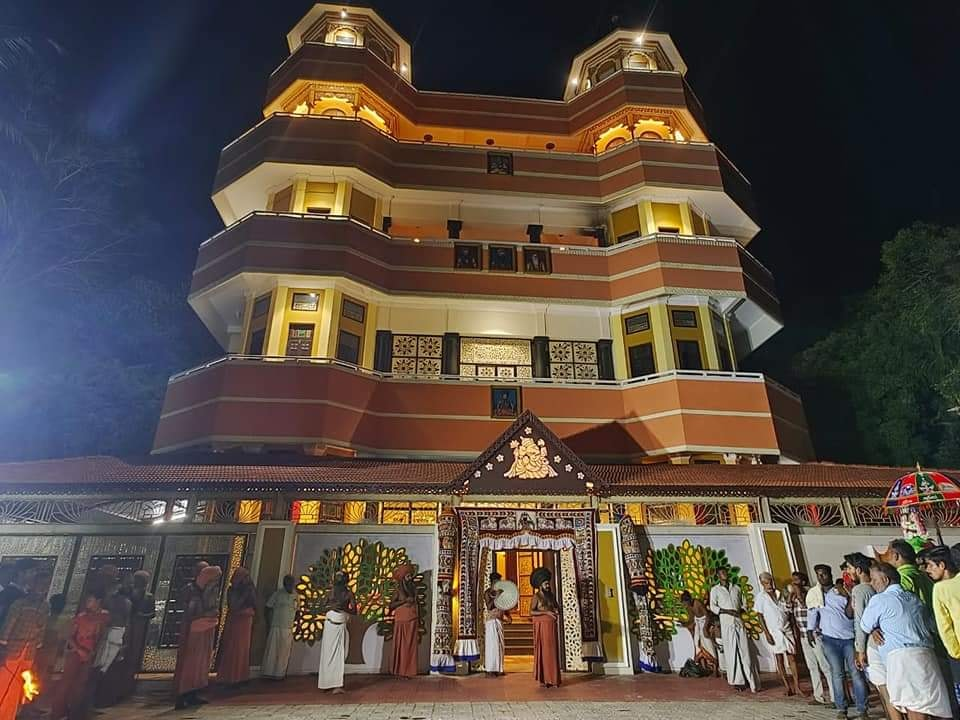
Dharmapuram Adheenam

Dharmapuram Adheenam (adheenam = mutt) was established in the 16th century and is a significant Saiva Siddhanta monastery located in Dharmapuram, Mayiladuthurai district. It has played a pivotal role in promoting Tamil literature, philosophy, and religious practices. The mutt is renowned for its contributions to Tamil education and has been a center for learning, attracting scholars and devotees alike. The Mutt maintains 27 Shiva temples as of 2019, including notable ones, such as Vaitheeswaran Koil near Sirkazhi, which are integral to its religious activities. The mutt runs schools and colleges, catering to approximately 10,000 students. The Dharmapuram Adhinam Arts College, established in 1946, upgraded in 1988, and affiliated with Bharathidasan University, is an example of the mutt's commitment to education, offering programs in Tamil and other disciplines.

Thiruvaduthurai Adheenam was also established in the 16th century and is another influential Saiva Siddhanta monastery situated in Thiruvaduthurai, Mayiladuthurai district. The mutt is dedicated to the worship of Masilamaniswara and has been a center of religious and cultural activities. It is involved in publishing Saivite literature, including works such as the Thevaram and Tiruvasakam, and has been associated with prominent Tamil literary figures. The mutt's influence extends beyond religious practices, contributing significantly to the preservation and promotion of Tamil traditions and culture. It manages 15 Shiva temples as of 2019.

Both the mutts played a significant role in presenting the Sengol, a golden sceptre, to Jawaharlal Nehru in 1947 and to Prime Minister Narendra Modi in 2023 during the new Parliament inauguration.

The district has a well-established network of educational institutions, including government and private schools, colleges, and vocational training centers.

== Healthcare ==
Healthcare facilities are provided through government hospitals, primary health centers, and private clinics, ensuring access to medical services for the population.

Periyar Government District Headquarters Hospital at Mayiladuthurai provides a wide range of medical services, including emergency care, surgery, maternity services, and outpatient consultations, serving as a primary healthcare provider for numerous villages and towns around Mayiladuthurai. A new block is being constructed to address the hospital's space constraints, with the project started in March 2023, and aiming for completion by March 2025. This new block development is expected to enhance the hospital's capacity by adding specialized medical services.

In 2024, the Government of Tamil Nadu proposed establishing a government medical college in Mayiladuthurai. The proposal was submitted to the Union Ministry of Health and Family Welfare for approval.

== Transport ==
Mayiladuthurai district is well-connected by road and rail. The Mayiladuthurai Junction is a major railway station on the Chennai–Villupuram–Thanjavur–Tiruchirappalli main line, providing easy access to other parts of Tamil Nadu and India. The district is also connected by a network of state highways and national highways, facilitating smooth transportation of goods and passengers.

=== Railways ===
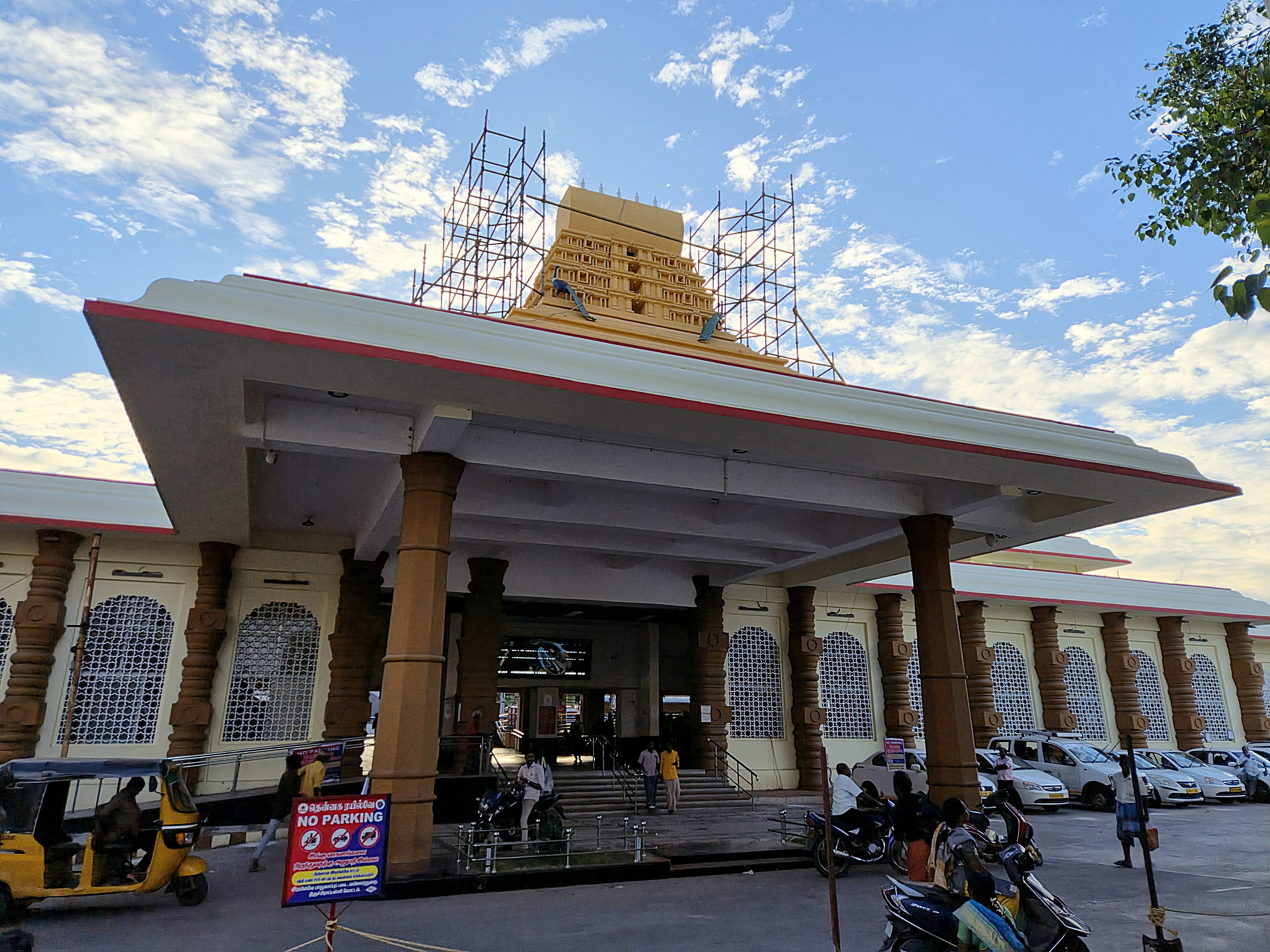
Mayiladuthurai Junction

The single-line sections from Villupuram to Cuddalore, Mayiladuthurai to Thanjavur (Main Line), and Mayiladuthurai to Tiruvarur have been electrified, enhancing rail connectivity and efficiency in the region. This project was completed in 2021 for 423 crore rupees.

The renovation works for Mayiladuthurai Junction under the Amrit Bharat Station Scheme includes beautification, renovation, and additional infrastructure development works are currently in progress. These initiatives are planned to be completed by the end of 2026, ensuring enhanced facilities and improved passenger experiences across the junction.

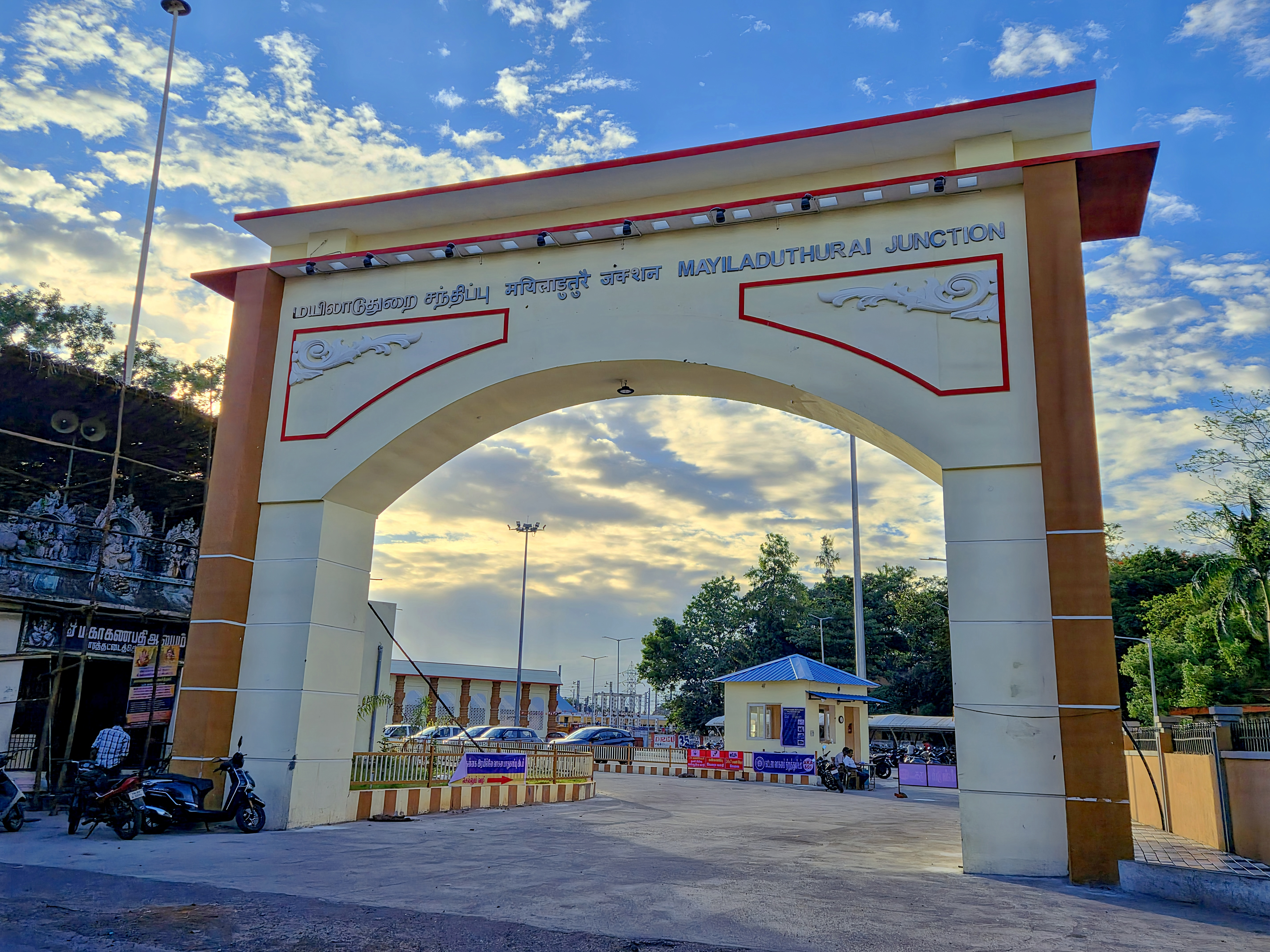
Mayiladuthurai Junction entrance arch

The expectation for the new track-doubling project (double-track railway) between Villupuram and Tiruchirappalli, via key towns such as Cuddalore, Chidambaram, Mayiladuthurai, Kumbakonam, and Thanjavur, has been steadily rising among commuters. This project, which falls on a major railway line section, is considered one of the most highly anticipated infrastructural developments in the region. With the upcoming Lok Sabha elections drawing nearer, the demand for this crucial upgrade has gained significant attention, reflecting its importance to the daily travel and connectivity needs of people in the delta region. As a recent development, the site survey works have been completed and are awaiting approval from GOI.

=== Roadways ===
National Highway 32, often referred to as NH-32 or the East Coast Road (ECR), is a significant highway in India that runs from Chennai to Thoothukudi. This road connects Mayiladuthurai district to the major cities and towns of Tamil Nadu and provides travelers with a scenic route along the eastern coast of India. The road works from Chennai to Sirkazhi have been completed, and the road was opened in March 2024.

There has been progress in 2024 on the NH-32, particularly the Mayiladuthurai – Karaikal stretch, which is expected to be completed by 2025. This involves widening the highway that connects Chennai and Thoothukudi, to improve connectivity between coastal areas and major ports.

District museum: the venue for the new museum has been shortlisted and the proposal forwarded to the state government for approval.

== Economy ==
=== Agriculture ===
Agriculture is a major component of the district's economy, with a large portion of the population involved in farming and related activities. The district benefits from fertile soil due to its location in the Kaveri Delta.

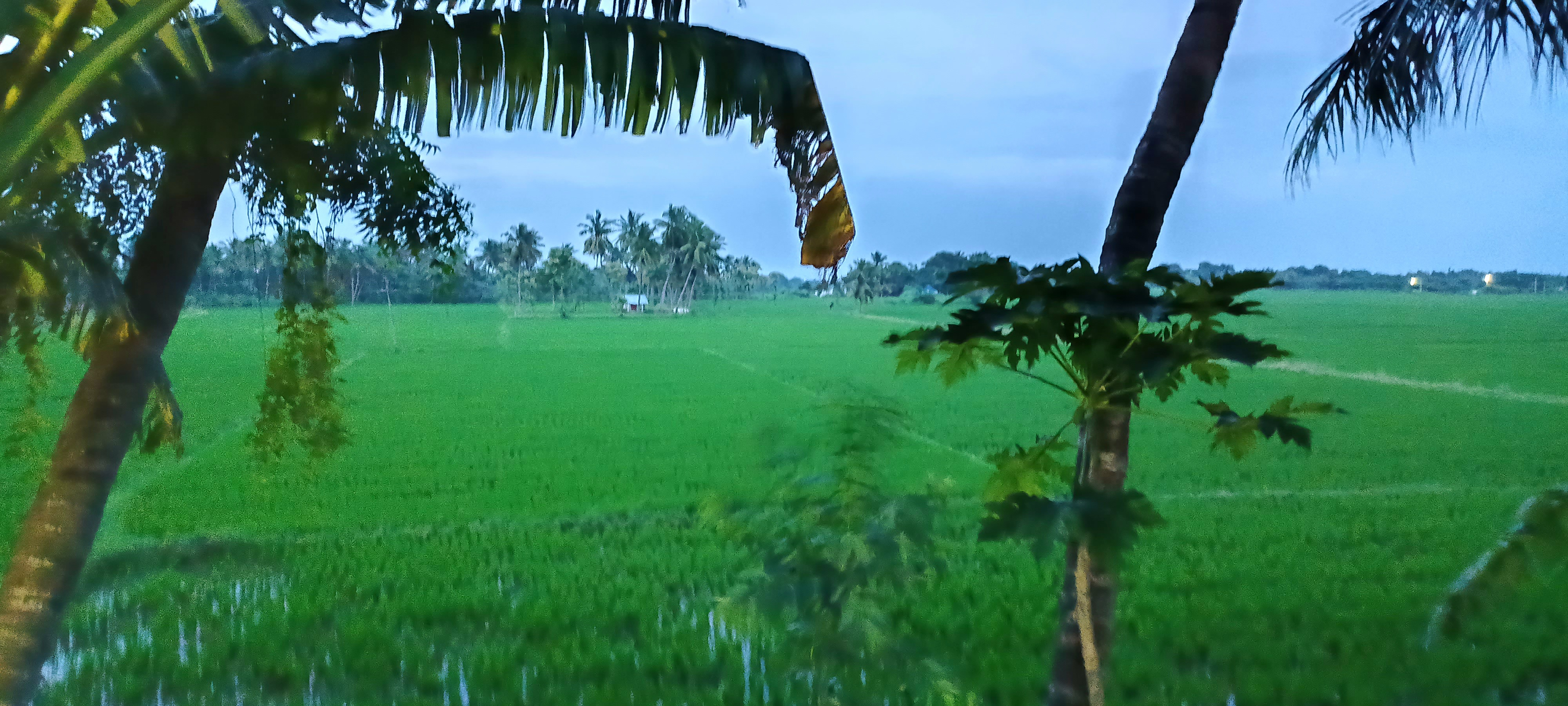
Paddy field, Mayiladuthurai

Paddy is the principal crop, cultivated on over 90% of the net sown area. The district's annual paddy production is approximately 3.42 lakh tonnes. During the 2024–2025 Samba rice growing season, around 85,400 tonnes of paddy were procured from farmers by the civil supply authorities, making the district the third-highest contributor among the other districts in the delta.

In addition to paddy, the district produces approximately 3,375 tonnes of groundnuts, 21,300 tonnes of various pulses, as well as gingelly (sesame), sugarcane, and around 17,200 bales of cotton.

Agricultural engineering services, such as rental rates for private harvesters have been implemented to support the farming community.

District Climate Action Plan (DCAP): Mayiladuthurai was the first district in Tamil Nadu to get a DCAP, which aims to tackle climate change impacts on agriculture, water resources, coastal ecosystems, and habitats.

=== Fishing ===
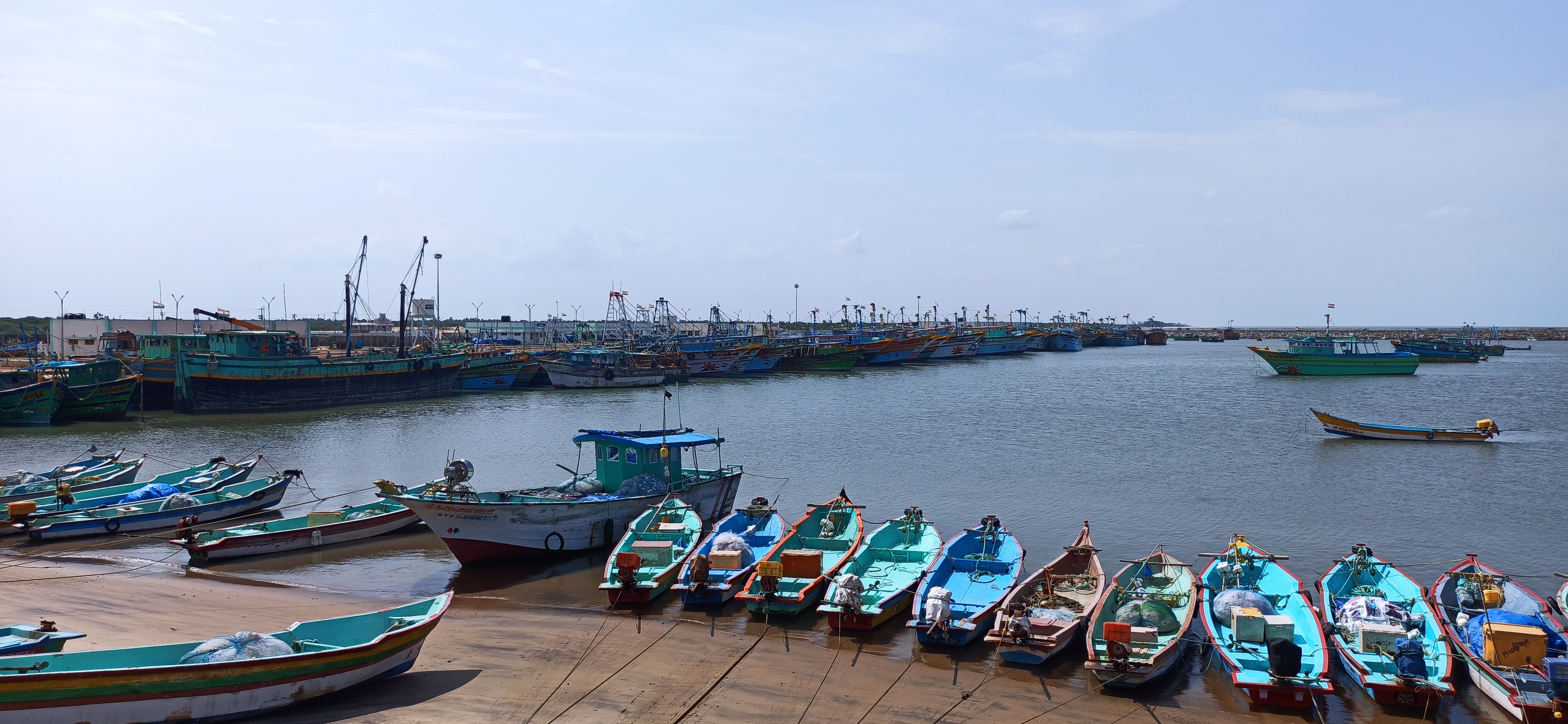
Poompuhar fishing harbour

The district falls within the Coromandel Coast, with a seashore length of 70.9 kilometres (44.1 mi), which is one of the longest on the Coromandel Coast. Fishing is also a major economic contributor, as there are 26 fishing villages in the district. The district is involved in activities such as dry fish processing and prawn farming, and hosts the first dry fish market in India, referred to locally as the Mayiladuthurai dry fish market. The market has a long-standing presence and continues to contribute to the district's economy and cultural practices. Its development has been supported by the district's coastal geography and access to marine resources. The estimated annual fish capture is approximately 18,000 tonnes.

The district has one major fishing harbor at Poompuhar and a medium-sized fishing harbor at Pazhayar.

=== Weaving ===
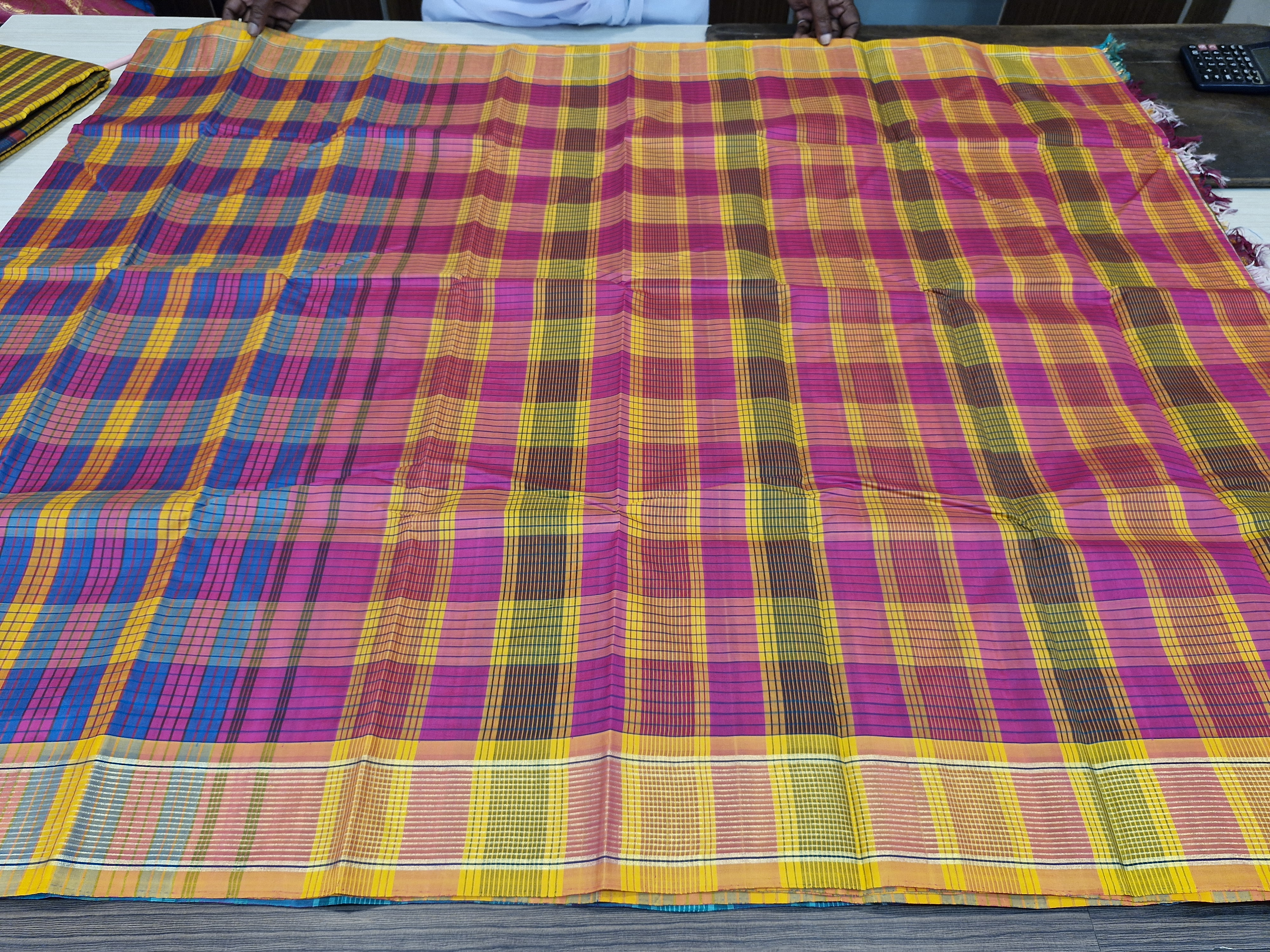
Koorai silk saree

Mayiladuthurai is known for its traditional weaving industry, which contributes to the local economy. The Koorainadu sari, also known as Koorai Pattu or Kornad sari, originated in Koorainadu (Kornad), a suburb of Mayiladuthurai. These saris are woven from a blend of silk and cotton and are characterized by their distinctive chequered patterns. They hold cultural significance in Tamil Nadu, particularly in weddings and religious ceremonies.

=== Industrial developments ===
One of the most significant recent industrial developments is the growth of the Tamil Nadu Small Industries Development Corporation Limited (SIDCO) Industrial Estate in Kulichar, near Mayiladuthurai. Established in 2009, this 12.56-acre estate has emerged as a key hub for small-scale industries, hosting 31 operational units as of September 2024. These units contribute significantly to the local economy and create employment opportunities, with the estate supporting a diverse range of industries, including tire retread, cement products, paint production, food and spice processing, iron and steel fabrication, and aluminum door manufacturing. The district also has a biofuel industry that uses seemai karuvelam (Prosopis juliflora), an invasive plant, to produce biofuel, highlighting innovative agro-based industrial development.

=== Oil and gas industry ===
The Oil and Natural Gas Corporation (ONGC) operates in Kuthalam, located in the Mayiladuthurai district, where it is involved in the extraction of natural gas and helium from the Cauvery basin. A key component of ONGC's operations is the helium plant, which is notable for being India's first helium extraction pilot plant, since 2008. This plant processes over one million cubic meters of gas daily, contributing to national self-reliance in helium production. Despite its significance, ONGC's operations face challenges due to environmental concerns and community opposition. Local protests, particularly from the Anti Methane Project Movement, have raised alarms over potential risks of soil and water contamination. In response to these concerns, the Tamil Nadu government introduced the Protected Special Agricultural Zone designation in 2020, which resulted in a moratorium on new projects in the area, beginning in 2021. This has curtailed ONGC's expansion plans in the region.

However, in terms of GDP contribution to the state of Tamil Nadu in this regard, the district ranks 34th out of 38 districts, recordeding a total GDP of 16,675 crore rupees in 2022–23.

Mayiladuthurai District GDP (P)
Year	GDP in crore Indian rupees
2020-21	12,563
2021-22	14,799
2022-23	16,675

=== Tourism ===
Mayiladuthurai district is known for its cultural and historical attractions, particularly temples and historical sites. The district features several significant Shiva and Vishnu temples, alongside historical forts and beaches.

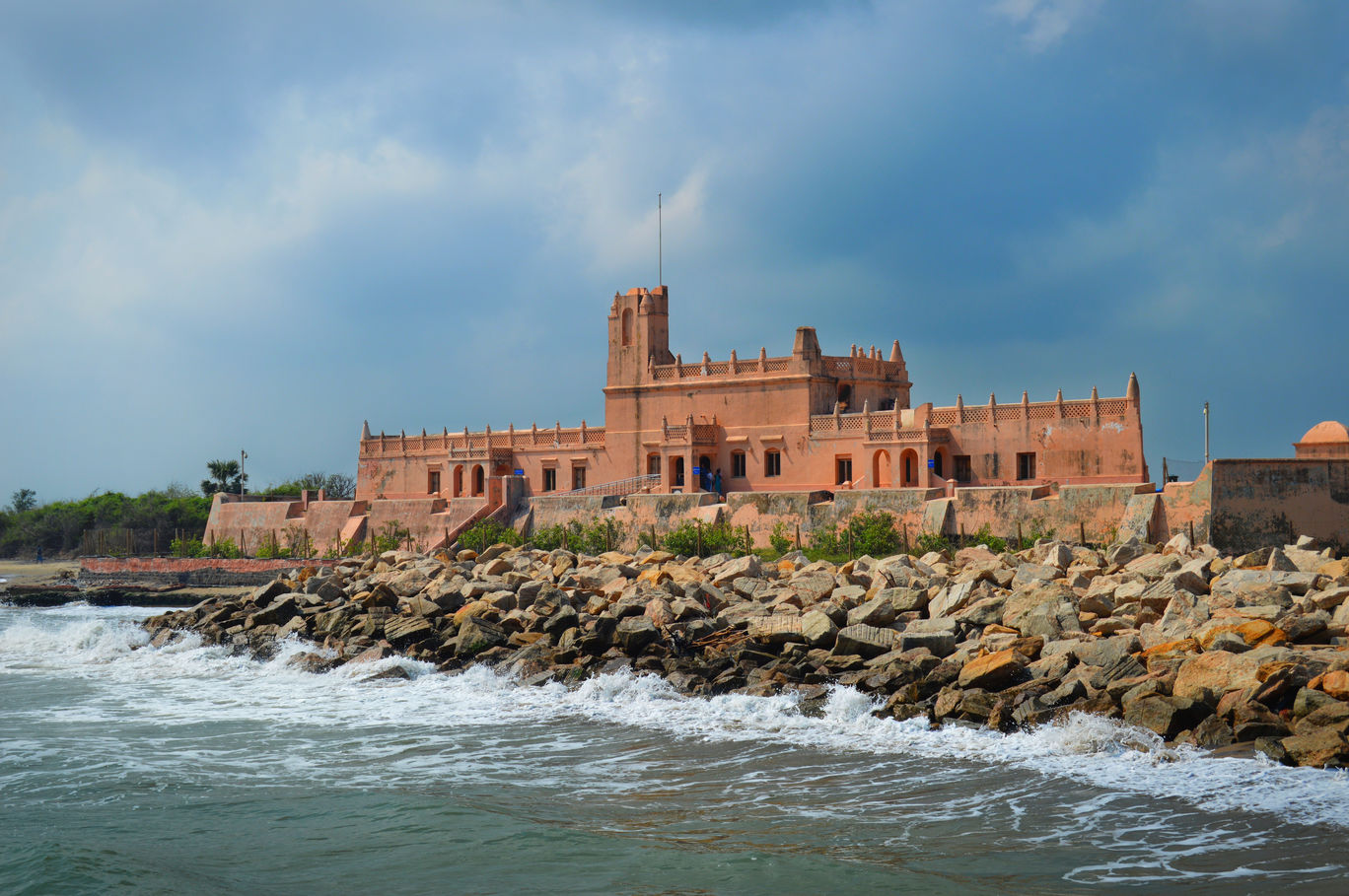
- Danish Fort at Tharangambadi
  Mayuranathaswami Temple: A historic Shiva temple, with intricate Dravidian architecture, that was built during the time of Medieval Cholas around (850 – 1200 CE), located in Mayiladuthurai.
- Navagraham temples (Nine Grahas Temples): The Navagraha temples to the Navagraha, the nine major celestial bodies. These nine planet deities are also known as the Navagrahas (Nine Planets). Each temple is located in a different village and is considered the abode of one of the Navagrahas.
- Parimala Ranganatha Perumal Temple: A Vishnu temple located in Thiruvilandur of Mayiladuthurai.
- Tharangambadi (Tranquebar): A coastal town with Danish colonial heritage, featuring the Fort Dansborg and the Zion Church.
- Danish Fort: Also called Fort Dansborg in Tharangambadi on the shores of the Bay of Bengal is a place of historic interest and it is used as a museum where the major artifacts of the fort and the Danish empire are displayed.
- Poompuhar: An ancient port city with archaeological remains and a serene beach.
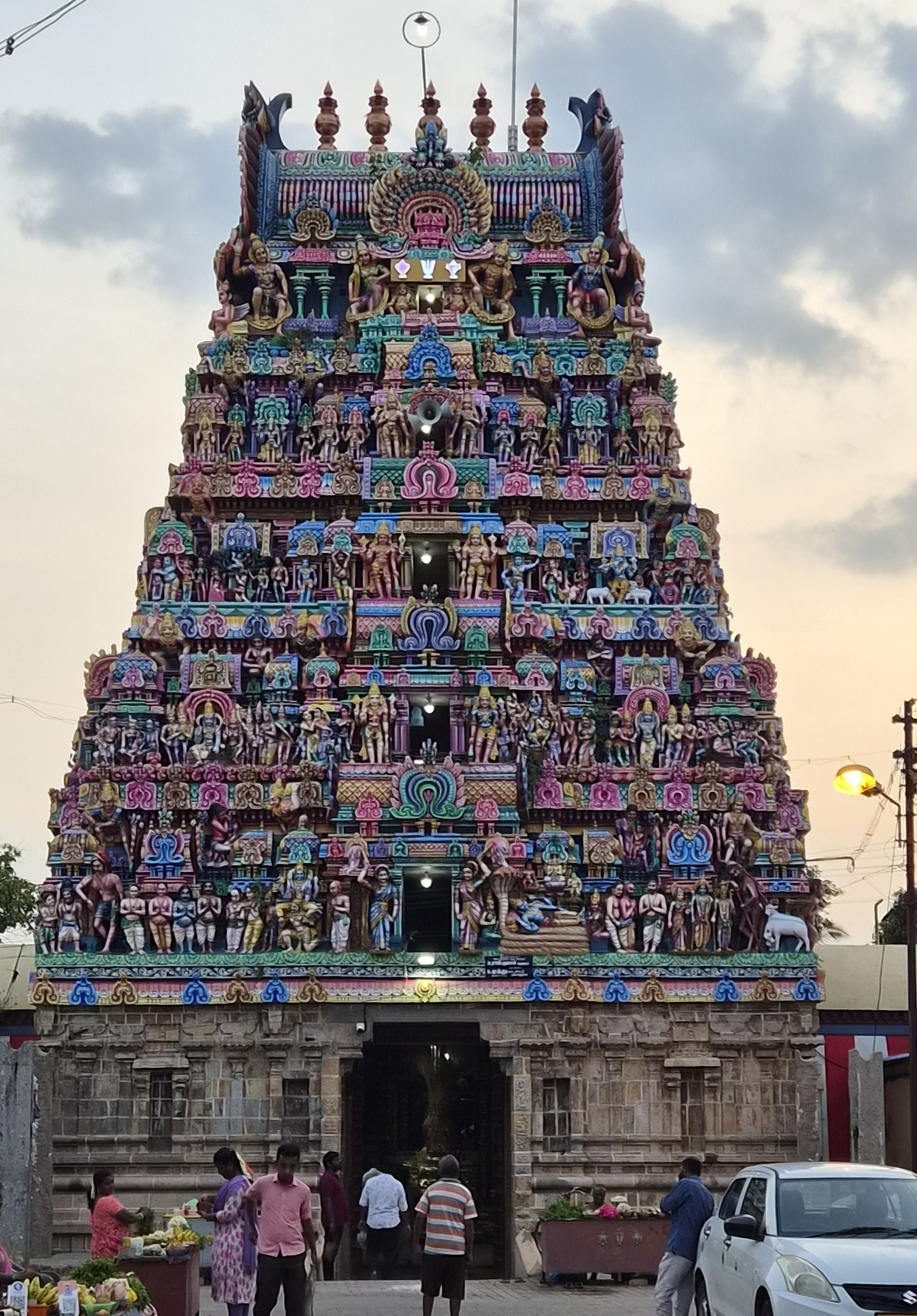
- Thiruvidaikazhi Subramaniya Swamy Temple
  Silapathikaram Art Gallery: A heritage site located in Poompuhar in the Mayiladuthurai district of Tamil Nadu. Scenes from the epic Silapathikaram are shown on the walls of the gallery.
- Vaitheeswaran Koil: A temple to Shiva, who is worshipped as Vaidyanathar or Vaitheeswaran, meaning "God of Healing". According to Hindu tradition, devotees believe that prayers offered to Vaitheeswaran can cure diseases.
- Sattainathar temple: A Hindu temple to Shiva located in Sirkali, Tamil Nadu, India.
- Amritaghateswarar-Abirami Temple: Temple to Shiva and Parvati as Abhirami.
- Nangur Divya Desams: A group of 11 temples near Nangur. The temples are believed to have been sanctified by Tirumangai Alvar, one of the 12 Alvars.
- Tamizhisai Moovar Mani Mandapam - A memorial hall in honor of the Tamil Isai Moovar, in Sirkazhi.
- Thiruvidaikazhi Subramaniya Swamy Temple - A hindu temple to Subramaniya Swamy, a Hindu deity widely known as Murugan.

== Culture and festivals ==
Mayiladuthurai district known for its festivals and traditional arts, particularly the Navagraha temples which are significant in Hindu astrology. The annual chariot festival at the Mayuranathaswami Temple is a major event, drawing thousands of devotees. The district is also known for its classical music and dance traditions, with many renowned artists hailing from the region.

Muzhukku is celebrated every year in October (from the first day of the month of Aippasi to the first day of Karthigai). Mudavan Muzhukku / Kadai Muzhuku / Thula Snana is the most celebrated festival on the Cauvery River at Thula Kattam, Mayiladuthurai. It is believed by the devotees that taking a dip in the Cauvery during the Thulam Snanam period is like taking a dip in the River Ganges and other holy rivers.

Mayialduthurai is known for religious festivals such as Cauveri Pushkaram (Thula festival) involving kumbamela of the north. During the month of Aippasi, pilgrims who otherwise use holy rivers such as the Ganges, Yamuna, and Saraswati bathe in the Cauvery River at the Thula Kattam in Mayiladuthurai to cleanse themselves of their sins.

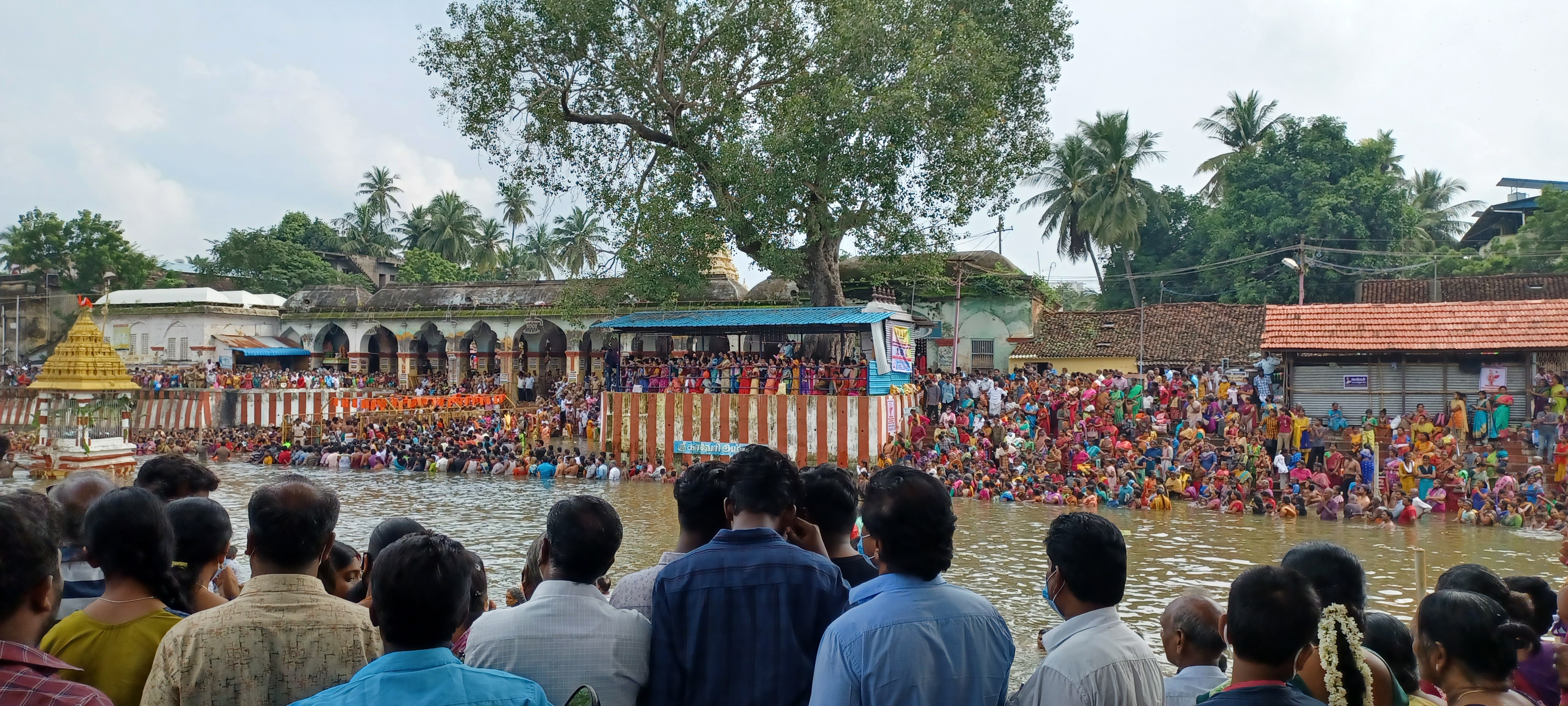
Thula Kattam - Mayiladuthurai

The Rekla Race, also known as the Elgai Race (எல்கை பந்தயம்), is a traditional race held annually during the festival of Kannum Pongal (mid-January). This heritage race, featuring cattle carts and horse carts, is organized in memory of Thirukadaiyur Uthirapathiyar and Narayanasami. The event is conducted under the auspices of the seven village panchayats of Thirukkadaiyur and the Tharangambadi town panchayat. The race takes place along the Thirukkadaiyur to Tharangambadi highway, covering a distance of approximately 10 kilometers. It attracts participants and spectators from across Tamil Nadu and foreign visitors, including over a hundred horse-and-bullock cart racers. The Rekla Race is a vibrant celebration of rural culture and tradition, drawing widespread attention for its historical significance and competitive spirit.

The town of Poompuhar, located in the district, is an ancient port city with a rich maritime history. It is associated with the Sangam period and is mentioned in the Tamil epic poem Cilappatikaram.

== See also ==
- Kaveri Pushkaram
- List of districts of Tamil Nadu
- Navagraha temples
