= Chinnasalem block =

Revenue block in Tamil Nadu, India

Coordinates: 11.649546°N 78.859863°E

The Chinnasalem block is a revenue block in the Kallakurichi district of Tamil Nadu, India. It has a total of 50 panchayat villages.

== List of Panchayat Villages ==
SI.No	Panchayat Village
1	Alamabalam.V
2	Ammaiyagaram
3	Ammakalathur
4	Anumanandal
5	Bangaram
6	Elavadi
7	Eliyathur
8	Eriyur
9	Ervaipattinam
10	Esanthai
11	Kadathur
12	Kalasamudram
13	Kallanatham
14	Kaniyamoor
15	Karanur
16	Karundhalakurichi
17	Karunkuzhi
18	Koogaiyur
19	Kudiraichandal
20	Kural
21	Mamandur.V
22	Mattigaikurichi
23	Melnariyappanur
24	Moongilpadi
25	Nagakuppam
26	Nainarpalayam
27	Nallathur
28	Namachivayapuram
29	Paithanthurai
30	Pakkambadi
31	Pandiyankuppam
32	Pethanur
33	Pethasamudram
34	Poondi
35	Rayappanur
36	Rayarpalayam
37	Sadayampattu
38	Sembakurichi
39	Thagamtheerthapuram
40	Thagarai
41	Thenchettiyandal
42	Thengiyanatham
43	Thensiruvalur
44	Thimmapuram
45	Thottapadi
46	Thottiam
47	Ulagankathan
48	Ulagiyanallur
49	V.p.agaram
50	Vasudevanur.A
