= Cholapandiyapuram =

- Location in Tamil Nadu Cholapandiyapuram (India)
- Coordinates: 11.868359°N 79.122849°E
- Country: India
- State: Tamil Nadu
- District: Kallakurichi

Cholapandiyapuram or Cholavandipuram or Cholapandipuram is a 1 sq. kilometre village in Tirukkoyilur taluk in Kallakurichi district in the Indian state of Tamil Nadu. Agriculture is the primary occupation of the people who live in this area. In 2011, the village had a population of 1,000 people.

== Location ==
Cholapandiyapuram is located 12 kilometres (7.5 mi) southwest of Tirukkoyilur, 16 kilometres (9.9 mi) northwest of Ulundurpettai.

== Transportation ==
Town buses depart from Tirukkoyilur bus stand (bus no: 5, 20) to Rishivandiyam go through Cholapandiyapuram. Otherwise, one can alight at Ariyur Koot road bus stop (all buses going from Tirukkoyilur to Ulundurpettai and Kallakurichi ) and can take shared auto.

== About the village ==
Cholapandiyapuram village has more than 1000 years old heritage. This village was a Jain centre during the 10th century C.E. Its name, "Cholapandiyapuram" means "the city of the Cholas and Pandyas" as it is located on the border of the ancient Chola and Pandya kingdoms.

== Andimalai ==
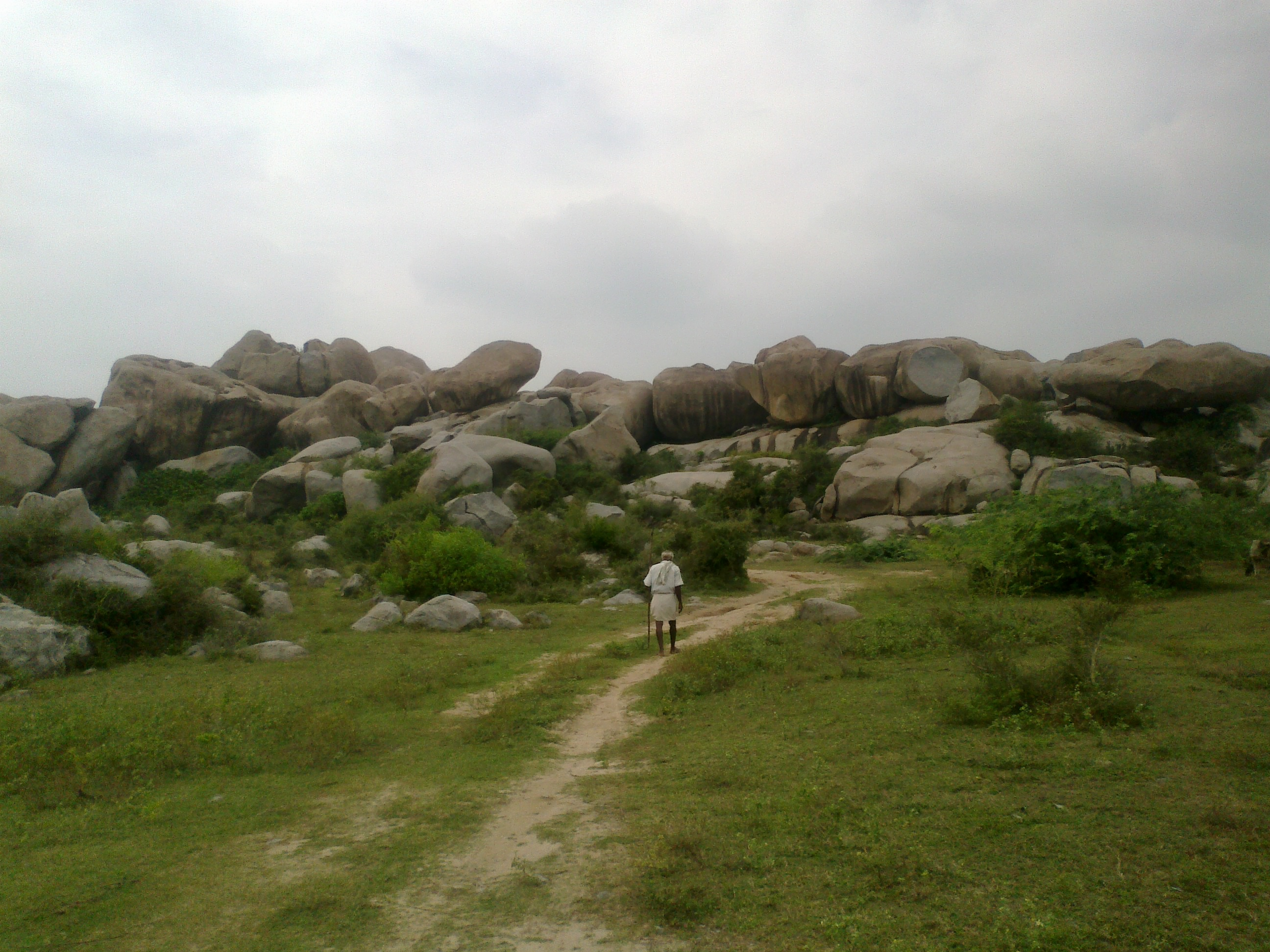
Andimalai Hillock

The attractive feature of this village is the presence of hillock called Andimalai with Jain caves, stone beds, inscriptions and sculptures. There are 25 stone beds and some of the stone pillows of the beds were carved semicircular. The 23rd Thirthankarar of Jainism, Parshwanathar or Parshva, Bahubali or Gomateshwara and Mahavira were nicely carved on the rock. An inscription said these carvings were made at the behest of Sriveli Konkaraiyar Puddhadigal. Another inscription was in the form of a poem: it mentions that a local chieftain, Siddhavadavan alias Sethirayan, donated Panaipadi village for the worship of these Jaina tirthankaras during the second regnal year (952 A.D.) of Chola king Gandaraditya. Statues of Dharmadevi and Iyakki was placed separately in the hill. Also two statues of Adinathar or Rishabha taken from nearby villages are kept in the hill. Inside a cave, a stone seat was found which possibly for a Jain monk where he sat and taught the students.

== Padiyendhal ==
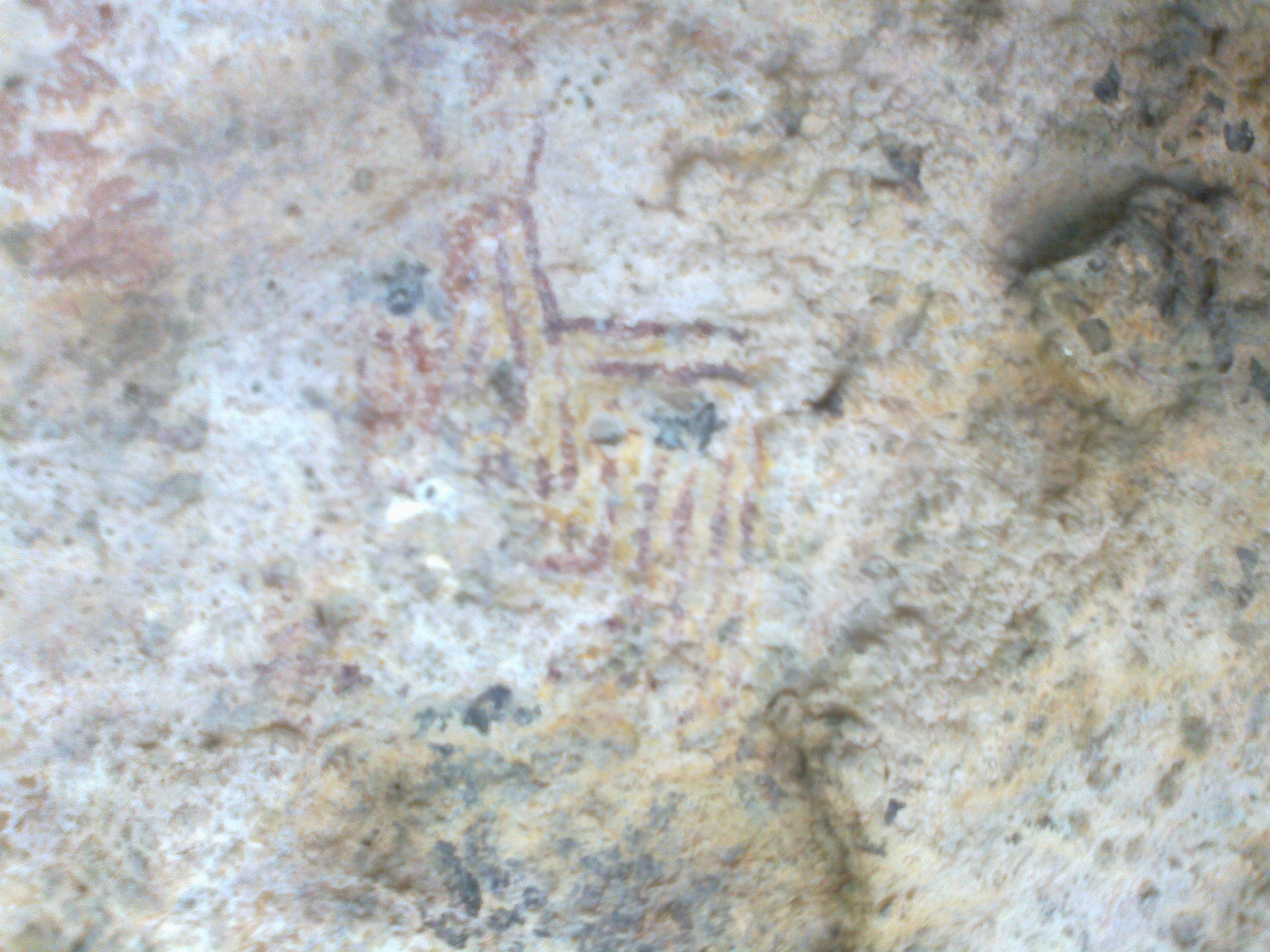
Horse like carving/sculpture

Padiyendhal is a rock art site in a small cave located backside of Andimalai. Actually the name "Padiyendhal" refers to the nearby village. Local people call this cave as "Irulan Kal". On the roof of the cave, ancient paintings of horse, bow and arrow structures are found. The symbols found in the roof and the side walls of the cave are similar to that of found in Indus Valley Civilization.

== Pictures ==
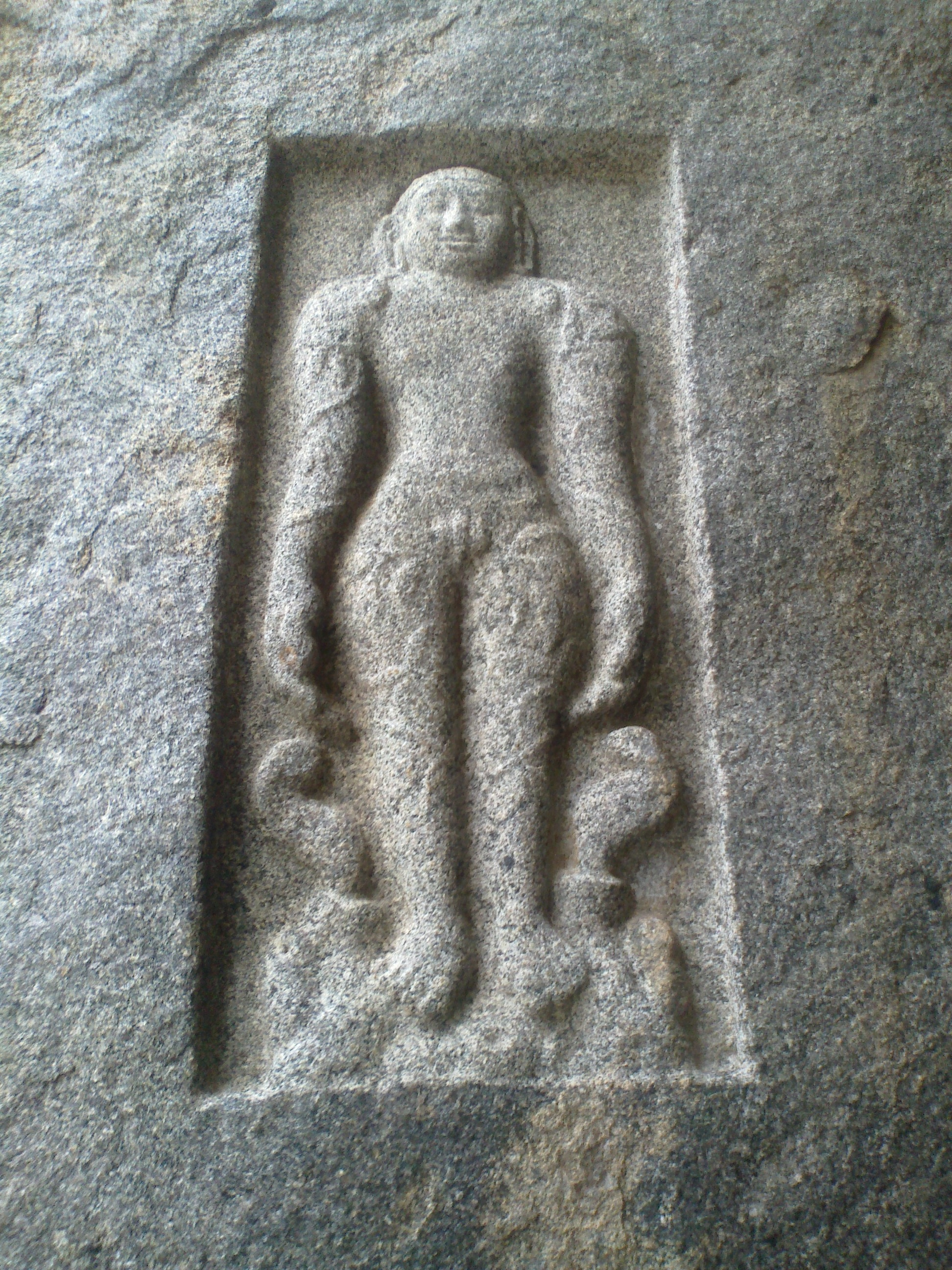
Bahubali

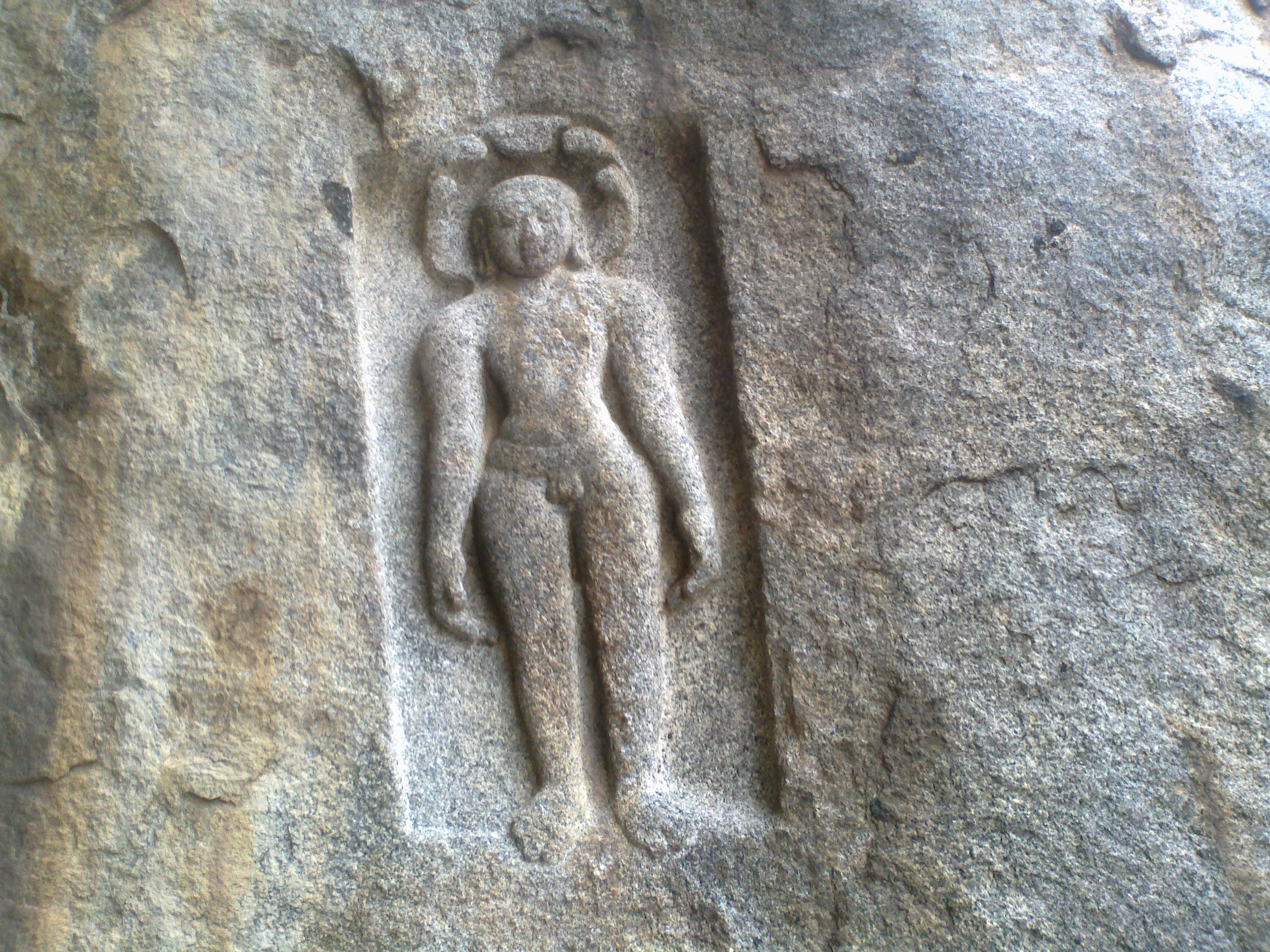
Parshva

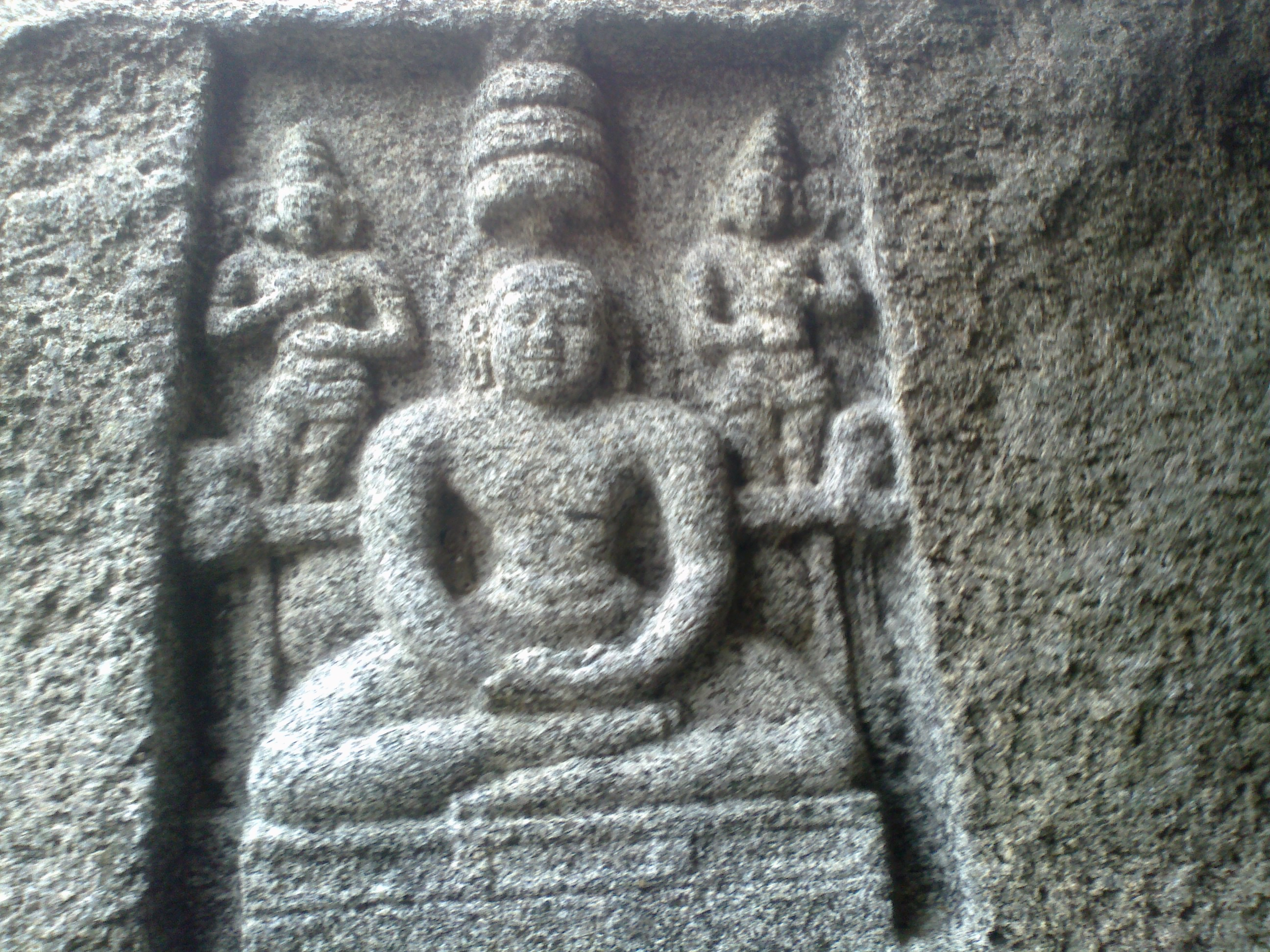
Mahavira

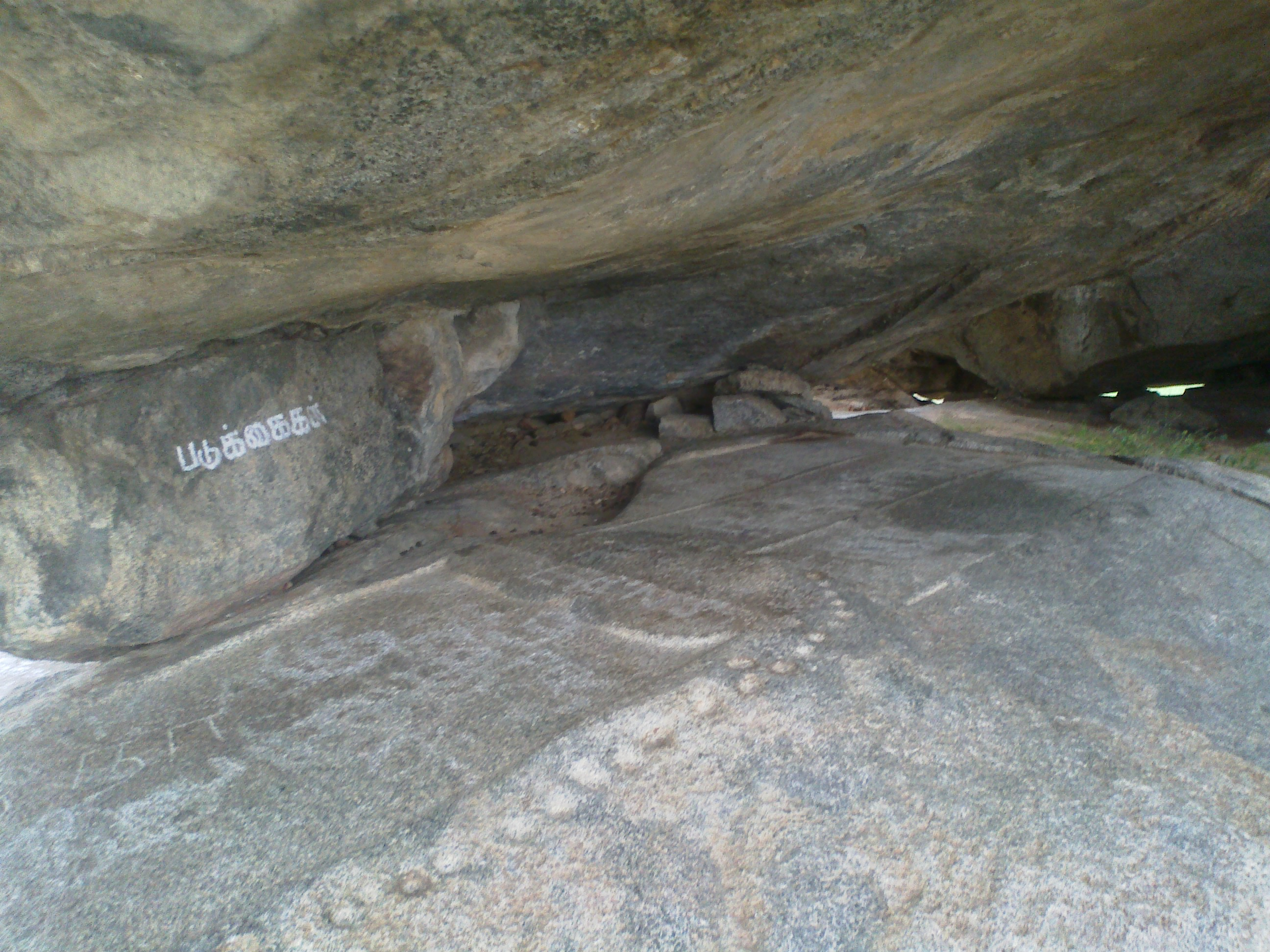
Stone Beds used by Jain Monks

== See also ==
- Jainism in Tamil Nadu
- Ennayiram
- Bhimbetka rock shelters
