= Jambai, Kallakurichi =

Jambai
- Jambai, Kallakurichi district, Tamil Nadu, India Jambai, Kallakurichi (Tamil Nadu)
- 12.014472°N 79.054527°E
- Location: Kallakurichi, Tamil Nadu, India

Jambai is a village with an area of 1 km^{2} (0.39 sq mi) in Tirukkoyilur (Tamil: திருக்கோயிலூர்) taluk in Kallakurichi district (Tamil: கள்ளக்குறிச்சி மாவட்டம்) in the Indian state of Tamil Nadu. The major occupation of the people living at this place is agriculture and handloom. In 2011, it had a population of 2,000 people.

== Etymology ==
Jambai got its name from Jambunatheshwarar temple, a Chola period (Shiva) temple. According to the inscriptions present inside the temple, this village was called as Valayur during the Parantaka Chola I period. Hence, "Jambai" might be a later name to this village. This temple is situated at the banks of river Thenpenaiyaar, where much kora grass grew, the Tamil word for kora grass is sambu, hence the name Jambu and also there is an inherited old story that the elephant belonging to the king went there to dip itself in water, where it stumbled upon the Shivlinga, blood started oozing from the Shivlingam, hearing the call of the frightened elephant people started to gather and this incidence reached the ears of the king and then the temple was built. Jambu means elephant. As the Shivalingam was found by the elephant the village and temple were named after it.

== Location ==
Jambai is located on the northern bank of the river, Thenpennai. It is 19 kilometres (12 mi) northwest of Tirukkoyilur and 25 kilometres (16 mi) south of Thiruvannaamalai.

== About the village ==
Jambai village has more-than-1000-year-old heritage. At Jambai, Saivism, Jainism, Buddhism and Saktism prevailed. In 2006, a beautifully carved 10th century A.D. Buddha sculpture was stolen from the middle of the fort area paddy field. There are two Siva temples, One Saptamatrika shrine, one Ayynar temple on the hill and other Ayyanar temple in north east corner of the village. Jain Tirthankara relief carving is seen in the hill on the way to Pallichandal. The importance of the village comes from the presence of the Shiva temple called Jambunatheshwarar temple and Jambaimalai containing 1st century CE Tamil Brahmi inscriptions, Jain abode, caves and beds.

== Jambunatheshwarar Temple ==
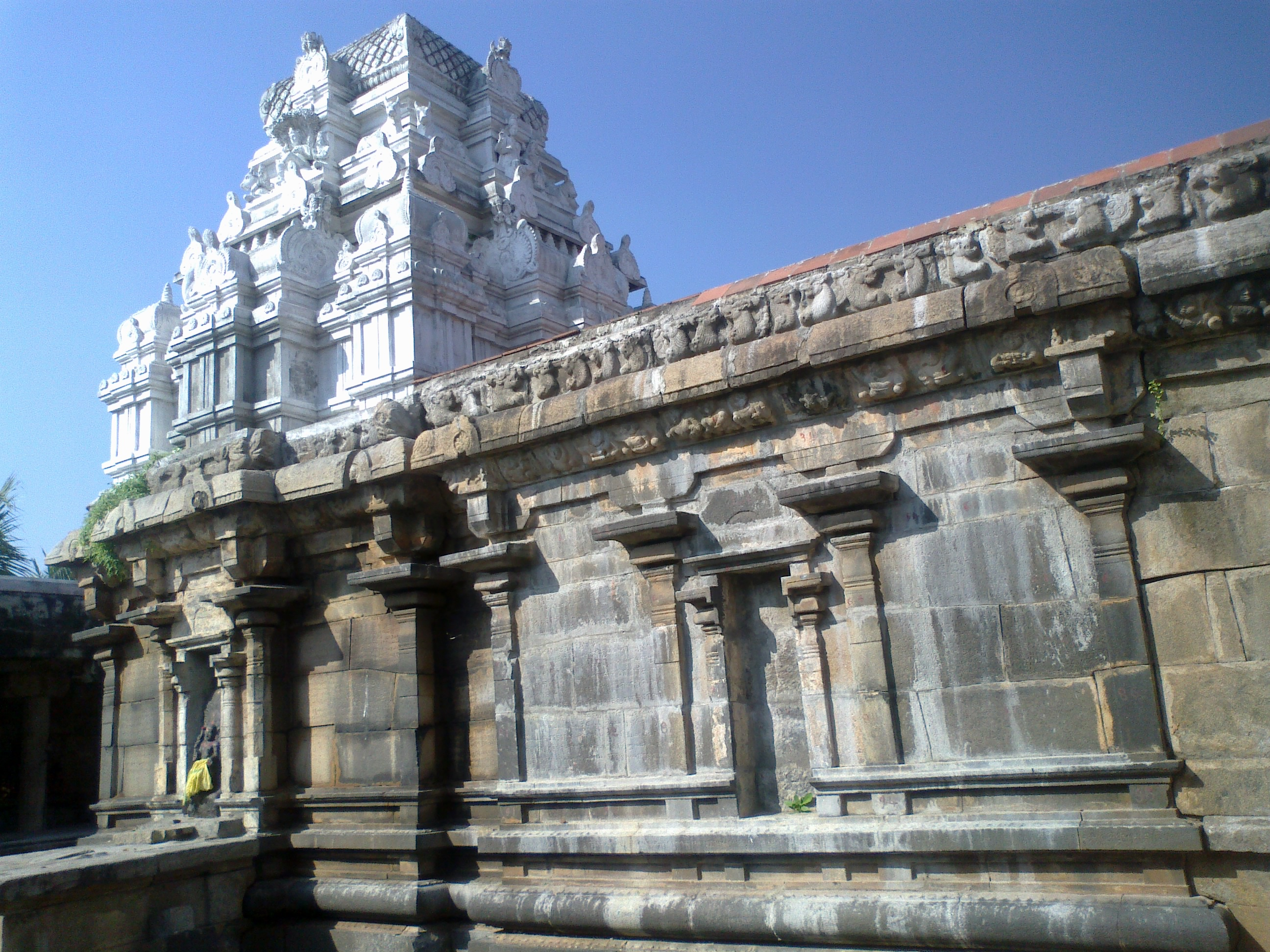
Jambunatheshwarar Temple

In Tamil, this temple is called Thanthondreeswarar temple (Tamil: தான்தோன்றீஸ்வரர் கோயில்). This Shiva temple was built by Cholas during 10th century. The temple walls contain full of Tamil vattezhuttu inscriptions of Cholas. This place was under Rashtrakuta rule during the mid-10th century, the statues of Lord Muruga, Jyestha Devi, Kalabairavar, Durga belonging to Rashtrakuta architecture, are found inside the temple. Since the temple become very old and damaged, reconstruction works are carried by local people of Jambai now.

== Jambaimalai ==
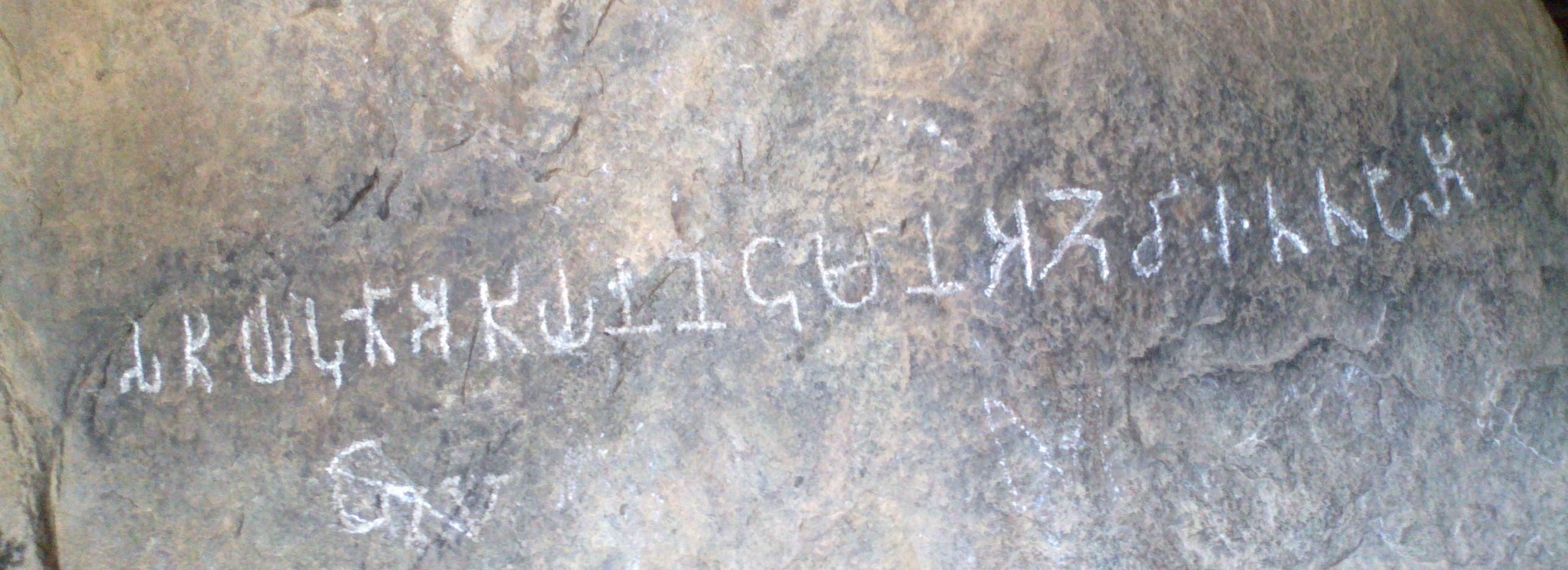
1st century CE Tamil Brahmi inscription

This is a small hillock in the north east of the village. Between a split area of this hillock there are signs of megalithic period settlement. The hillock contains a cavern called Dasimadam where Tamizhi inscriptions dated to 1st century CE is found. The epigraph is in Tamil (except for the title in Prakrit) and reads "Satiyaputo Atiyan Nedumaan Anjji itta Paali". In (Tamil: ஸதியபுதோ அதியந் நெடுமாந் அஞ்சி ஈத்த பாழி). The meaning of the epigraph may be rendered as "The abode (pali) given by (itta) Atiyan Nedumaan Anji (name), the Satyaputra (title)". Though the record is a short one in a single line, it throws valuable light on various aspects of South Indian history. The inscription clears the doubt about the identity of the Satyaputras, a dynasty of rulers, mentioned in Ashoka's inscriptions in the 3rd century BCE. Opposite to this cavern, another cave with four Jain stone beds have been found which confirms that Jambai was a Jain centre. West of this hillock in a small stone boulder, a 10th-century C.E. Tamil inscription of Kannaradeva or Krishna III, a Rashtrakuta king, found along with a relief work of Jyestha Devi. South of this inscription a lake for irrigation was constructed.

== Pictures ==
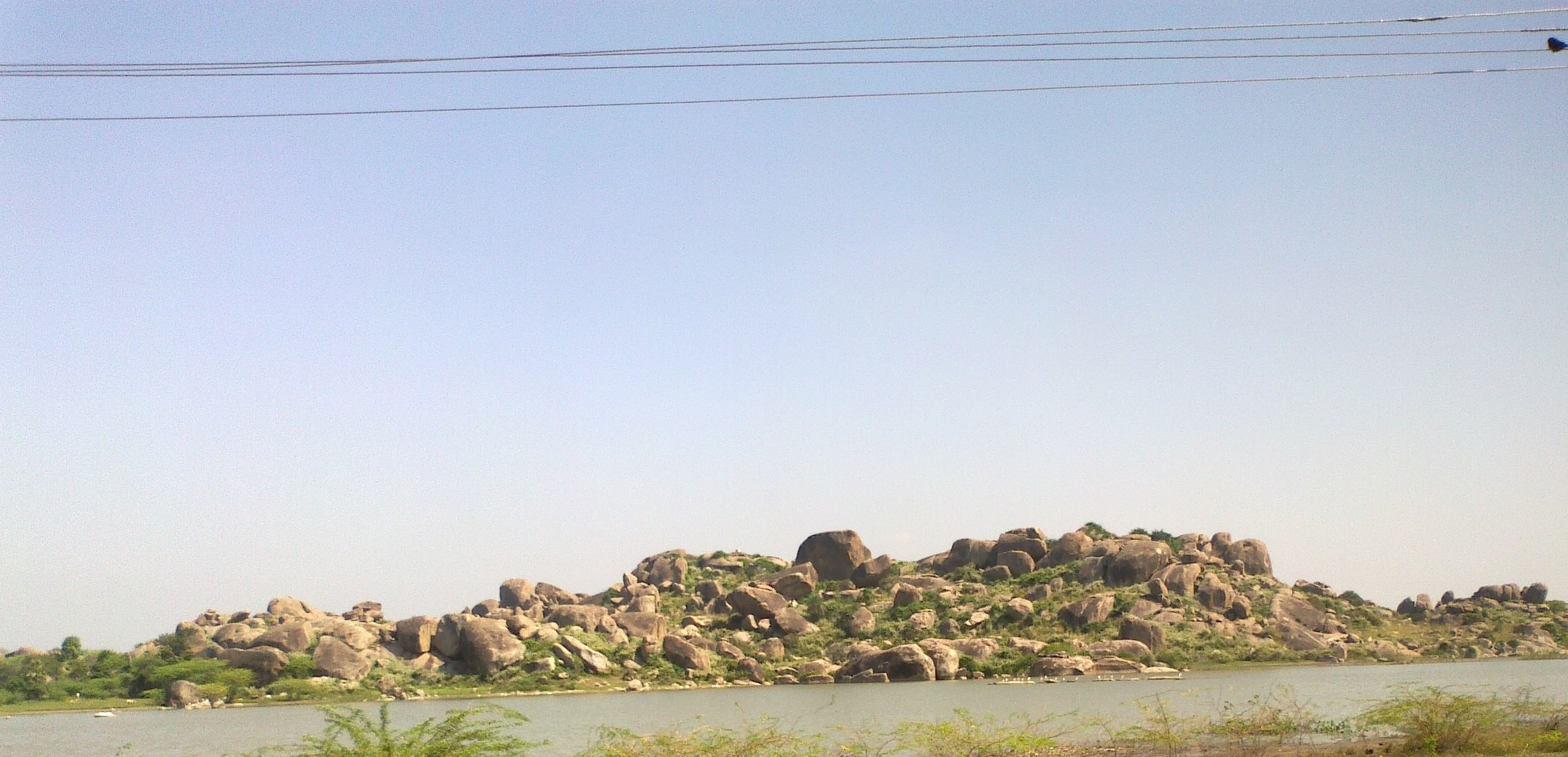
Jambaimalai along with lake

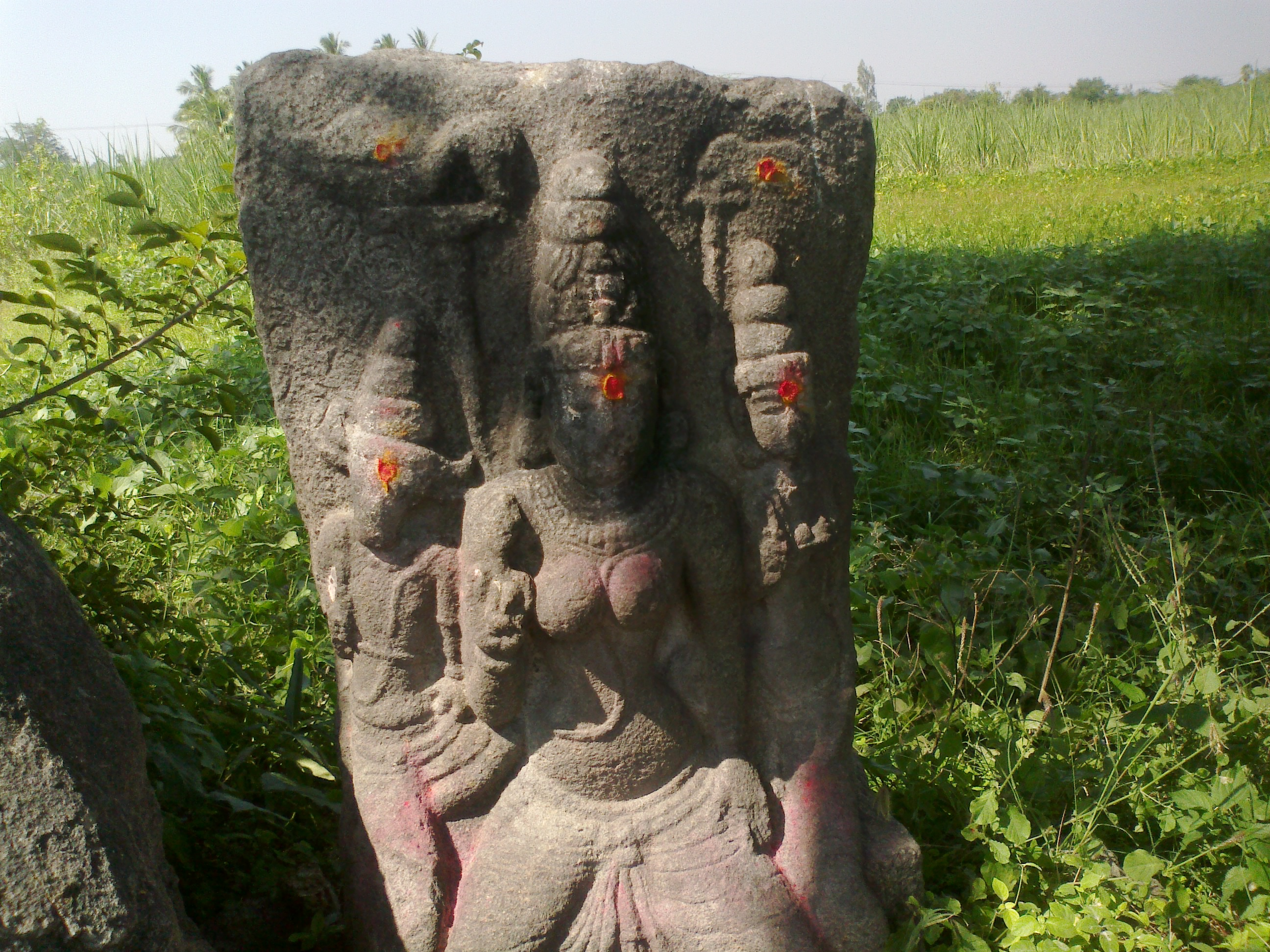
Jyestha devi

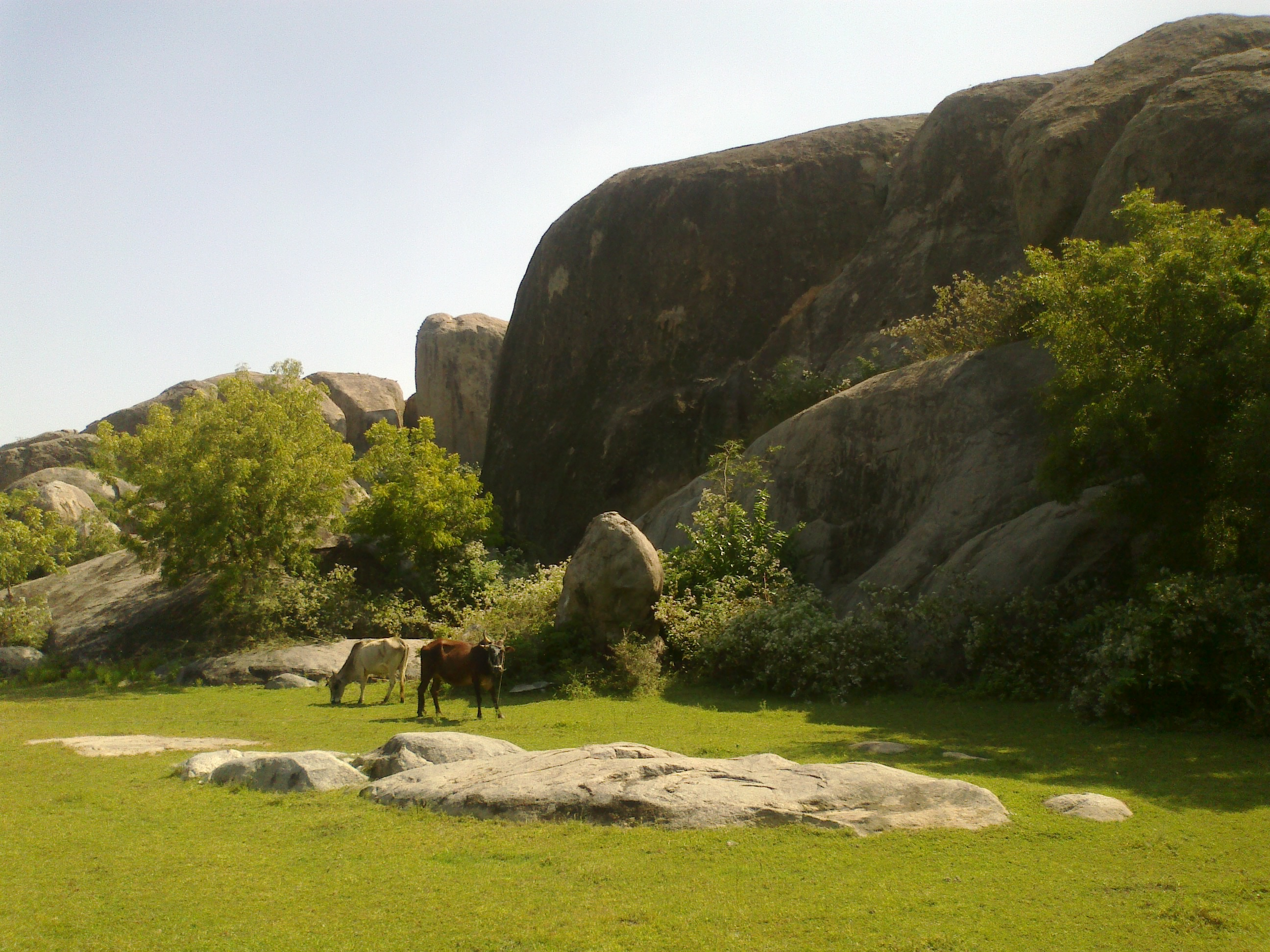
jambaimalai hillock

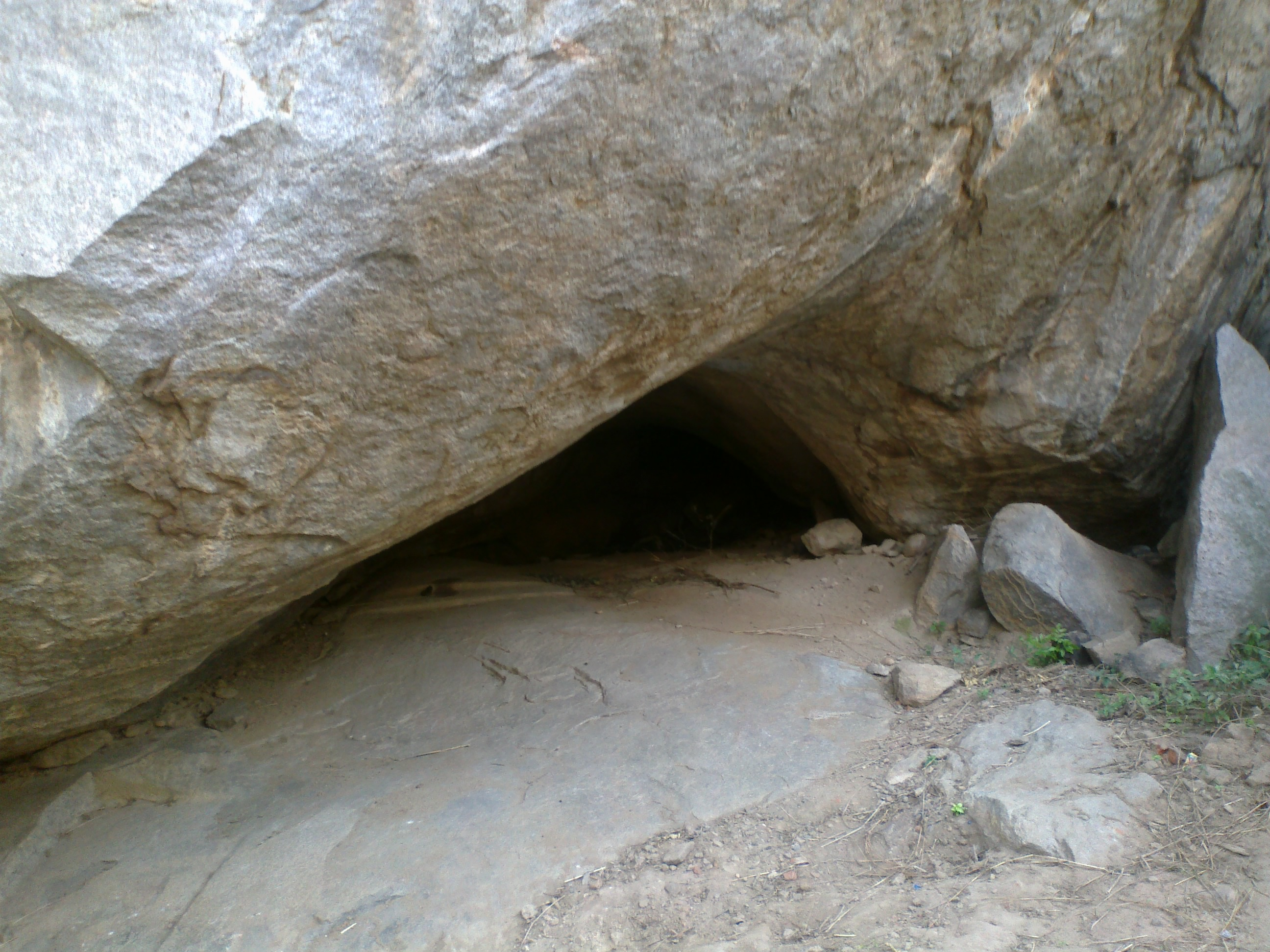
Jain cave

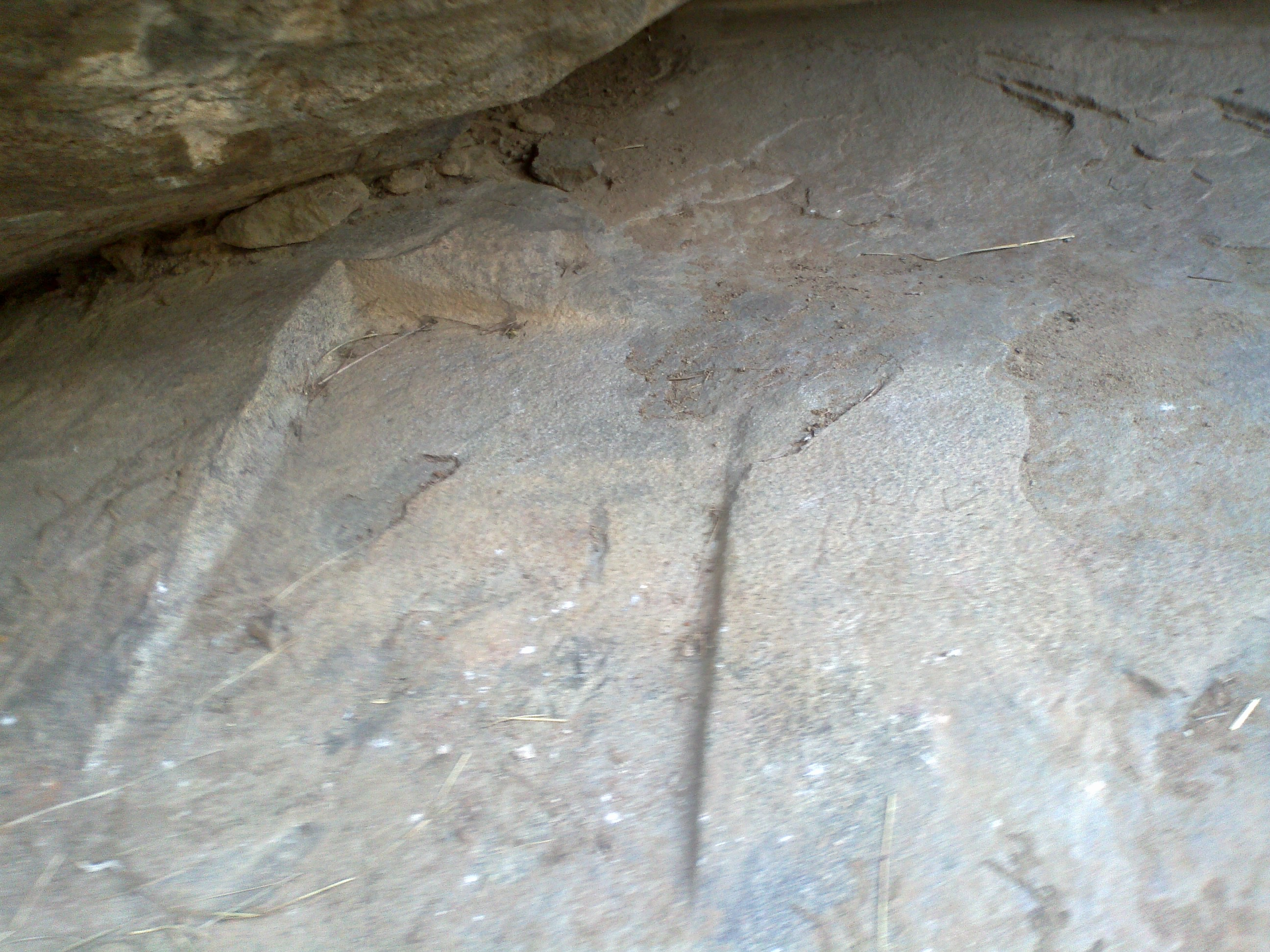
Jain beds

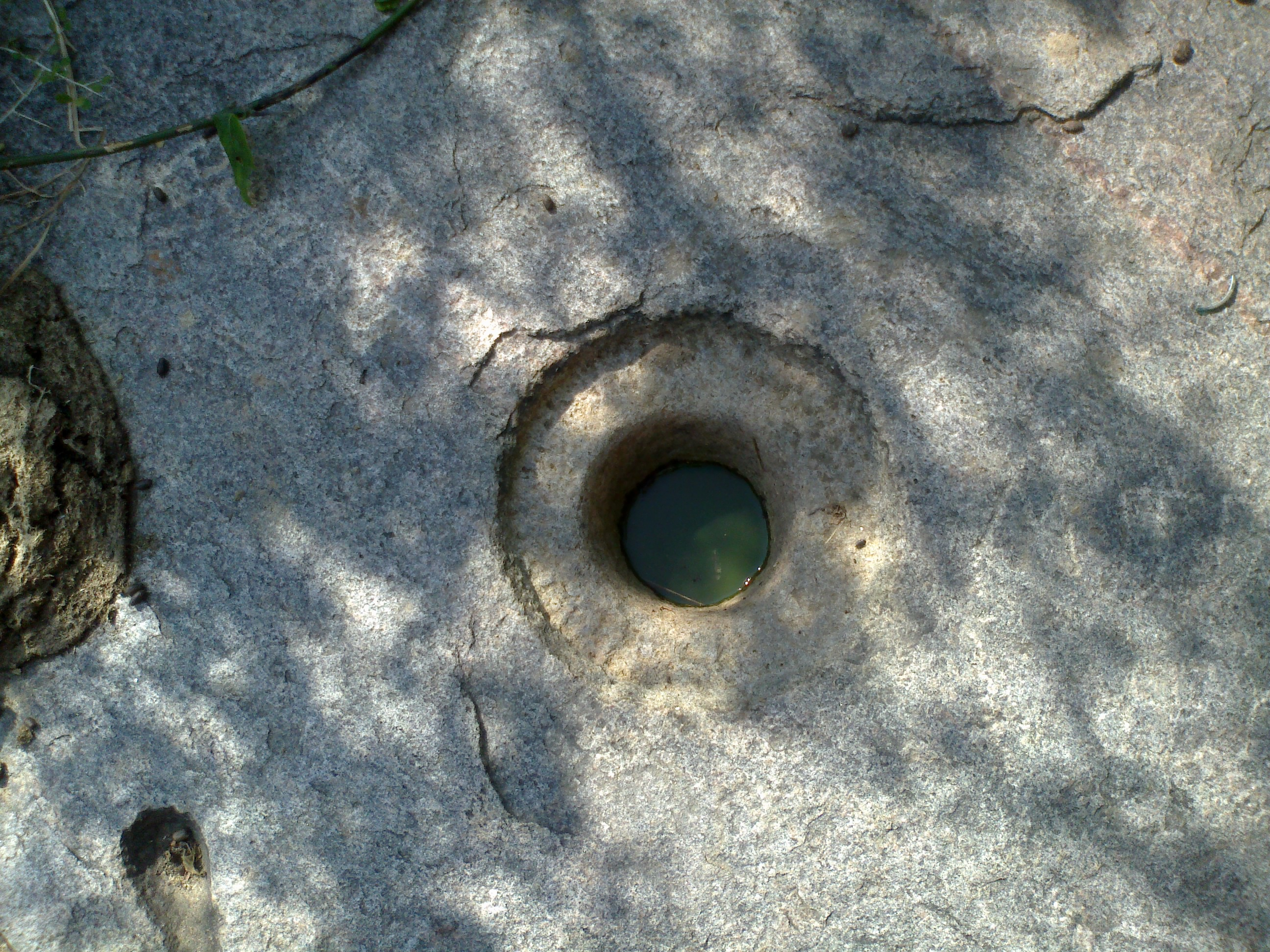
Rock pit used by Jain monks

== See also ==
- Velirs
- Jainism
- Ennayiram
- Cholapandiyapuram
