= Aathiyandal =

Athiyandal
- village
- Location in Tamil Nadu, India Athiyandal (India)
- Coordinates: 12°00′00″N 79°05′47″E
- Country: India
- State: Tamil Nadu
- District: Villupuram

Languages
  - Official: Tamil
- Time zone: UTC+5:30 (IST)
- PIN: 605754
- Vehicle registration: TN 32
- Nearest city: Chennai, Salem, Trichy.
- Lok Sabha constituency: Kallakurichi
- Vidhan Sabha constituency: Rishivandiyam

Athiyandal is a village in Tirukkoyilur, Taluk in Kallakurichi district in the state of Tamil Nadu, India. It is about 18 km from the town of Thiruvannamalai.

== Festivals ==
Festivals are held in the village during the Tamil months of Karthikai; Thai (Makar Jyothi of Ayyappan) and Masi and Panguni (Panguni Uthiram is considered the birthday of Ayyanar). Usually the deity Murugan (Krishna) is worshipped within the temple, but on the day of the festival likenesses of the deities are taken through the streets so that all the locals can see them. Three richly decorated chariots, resembling temple structures, are pulled through the streets. Generally, a mass assembly of large a number of related family members is organized during the spring for a period of 2 to 3 days. The annual festival is traditionally opened with the hoisting of a flag. After this time, villagers neither can neither leave nor enter the village.

The Koothu performers dance and recite songs and narrations, which often end with moral quotes.

== Climate ==
Athiyandal is heavily dependent on monsoon rains, and is therefore prone to droughts should the monsoons fail. The climate of the village ranges from dry sub-humid to semi-arid. The village has three distinct periods of rainfall:

1. The advancing monsoon period, South West monsoon (from June to September), with strong south-westerly winds.
2. North East monsoon (from October to December), with dominant north-easterly winds.
3. Dry season (from January to May).

The normal annual rainfall in the village is about 945 mm (37.2 in), about 48% of which falls during the North East monsoon, and 32% during the South West monsoon. As the village is entirely dependent on rains for recharging its water resources, monsoon failures can lead to acute water scarcity and severe drought.
