= Veerasolapuram =

Veerasolapuram Veeracholapuram
- village
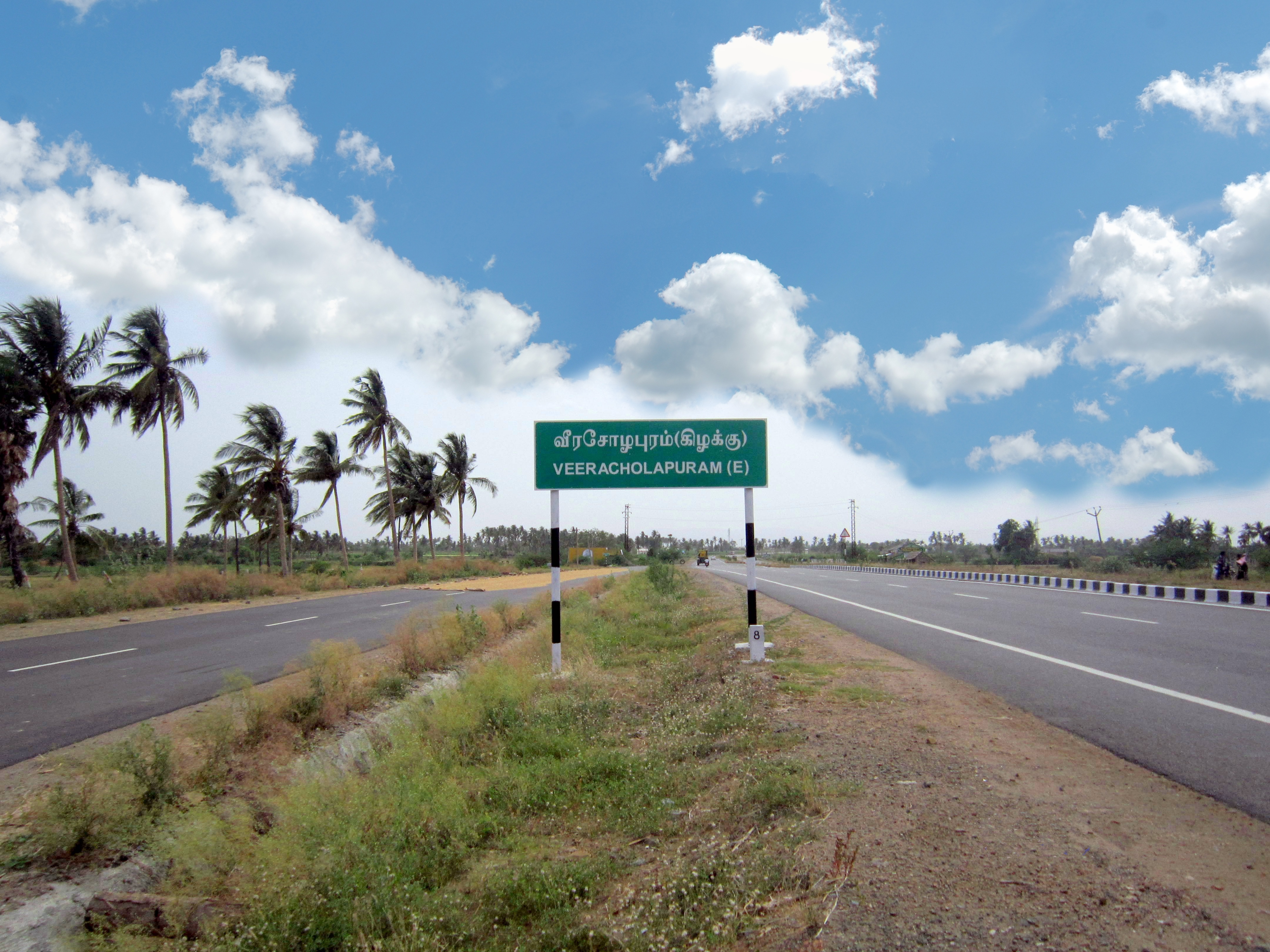
- National Highway-79

- Location within Tamil Nadu Location within India
- Coordinates: 11.747483°N 79.029357°E
- Country: India
- State: Tamil Nadu
- District: Kallakurichi
- Taluka: Kallakkurichi

Population (2011)
  - Total: 1,929
- Time zone: UTC+5:30 (IST)
- PIN: 606 206
- Telephone code: 04151
- Vehicle registration: TN-15

Veerasolapuram (also Veeracholapuram or Viracholapuram) is an ancient village located near Kallakurichi in Kallakurichi district, Tamil Nadu, India.

== Climate ==
The temperature is moderate; the maximum and minimum temperatures being 38 °C and 21 °C respectively. The town gets its rainfall from the northeast monsoon in winter and the southwest monsoon in summer. The average annual rainfall is 1070 mm.

== Agriculture ==
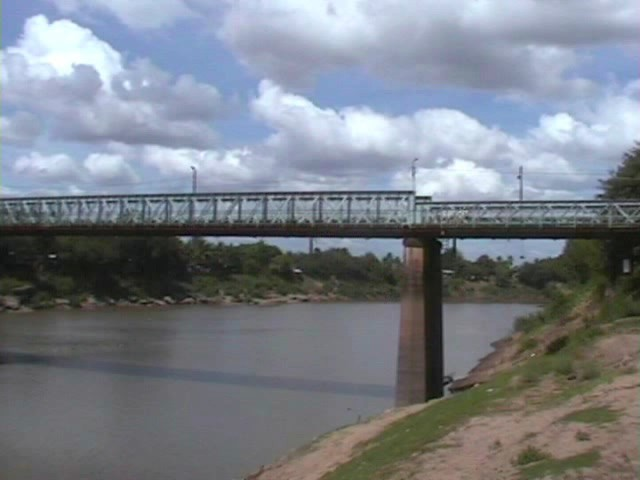
ManiMutha River

Veeracholapuram is an agricultural village. Major crops cultivated are sugarcane and rice. The river Manimuktha runs through the village providing enough water throughout the year for irrigation.

== Historical Temples ==
Veeracholapuram is famous for its Shiva Temple and is known as Nareeswarar Sivan Temple (also Narishwara, Nagareshwara, or Ardhanareshwara Temple).

=== Idol Theft ===
The idols of Shiva, Parvati and other deities were stolen sometime in 1960s and were traced by the Idol Wing of the Tamil Nadu Criminal Investigation Department (IW-CID) with the help of volunteer-collective India Pride Project to various museums/institutions in the United States.

Tripurantaka and Tripurasundari (Cleveland Museum)

S.No.	Deity	Stolen Idol traced to	Country	Current status	More Details
1	Tripurantaka	Cleveland Museum of Art	United States	Unknown	
2	Tripura Sundari	Cleveland Museum of Art	United States	Unknown	
3	Nataraja	Private collector	United States	Unknown	Auctioned by Christie's in 2003
4	Sundarar	Freer Gallery of Art	United States	Unknown	
5	Paravai Nachiyar	Freer Gallery of Art	United States	Unknown	
6	Veenadhara Dakshinamurthy	Private collector	United States	Unknown	Auctioned by Christie's in 2013
7	Nandikeshwarar		United States	Unknown	
