= Eliyathur =

Village in Tamil Nadu, India

Eliyathur is a village in Chinnasalem block, Kallakkurichi division, Kallakurichi district of Tamil Nadu.
