= Somandargudi =

Somandargudi Somandarkoil
- Village
- Location in Tamil Nadu, India
- Coordinates: 11.73893°N 78.97386°E
- Country: India
- State: Tamil Nadu
- District: Kallakurichi

Population (2001)
  - Total: 2,742

Languages
  - Official: Tamil
- Time zone: UTC+5:30 (IST)
- PIN: 606 213
- Telephone code: 04151
- Vehicle registration: 15

Somandargudi is a village in Kallakurichi district in the state of Tamil Nadu, India. It is located on the north bank of the river Gomuki, It is 6 km away from Kallakurichi, in Sankarapuram Taluk.

As per 2001 India census, Somandargudi had a population of 2,742. Males constitute 50% of the population and females 50%. Most of the villagers are farmers.

There is an elementary school, built by the villagers and since 1969 there has also been a Government high school.

== Religion ==
There are many Hindu temples in Somandargudi. These include the ancient and popular Somanatheswara Temple (Tamil: ஞீ சோமநாதீஸ்வரர் திருக்கோவில்). This temple was built by Parantaka Chola at the end of the 10th century.

== Politics ==
S. P. Pachaiappan was one of the MLAs in 1967-1971 and S. Kaletheerthan was MLA (1980-1984 & 1984–1989).
