= Kattuedayar =

Kattuedayar Kattuedayar
- village
- Country: India
- State: Tamil Nadu
- District: Kallakurichi district

Languages
  - official: Tamil
- Time zone: UTC+5:30 (IST)
- Postal code: 605751

Kattuedayar is a village in Ulundurpet taluka of Kallakurichi district, Tamil Nadu, India.

According to the 2011 Population Census, Kattuedayar has a population of 5,374 people, divided into 1,167 families, with 2,736 males and 2,638 females.
