= Ulundurpet railway station =

Railway station in Tamil Nadu, India

Ulundurpettai
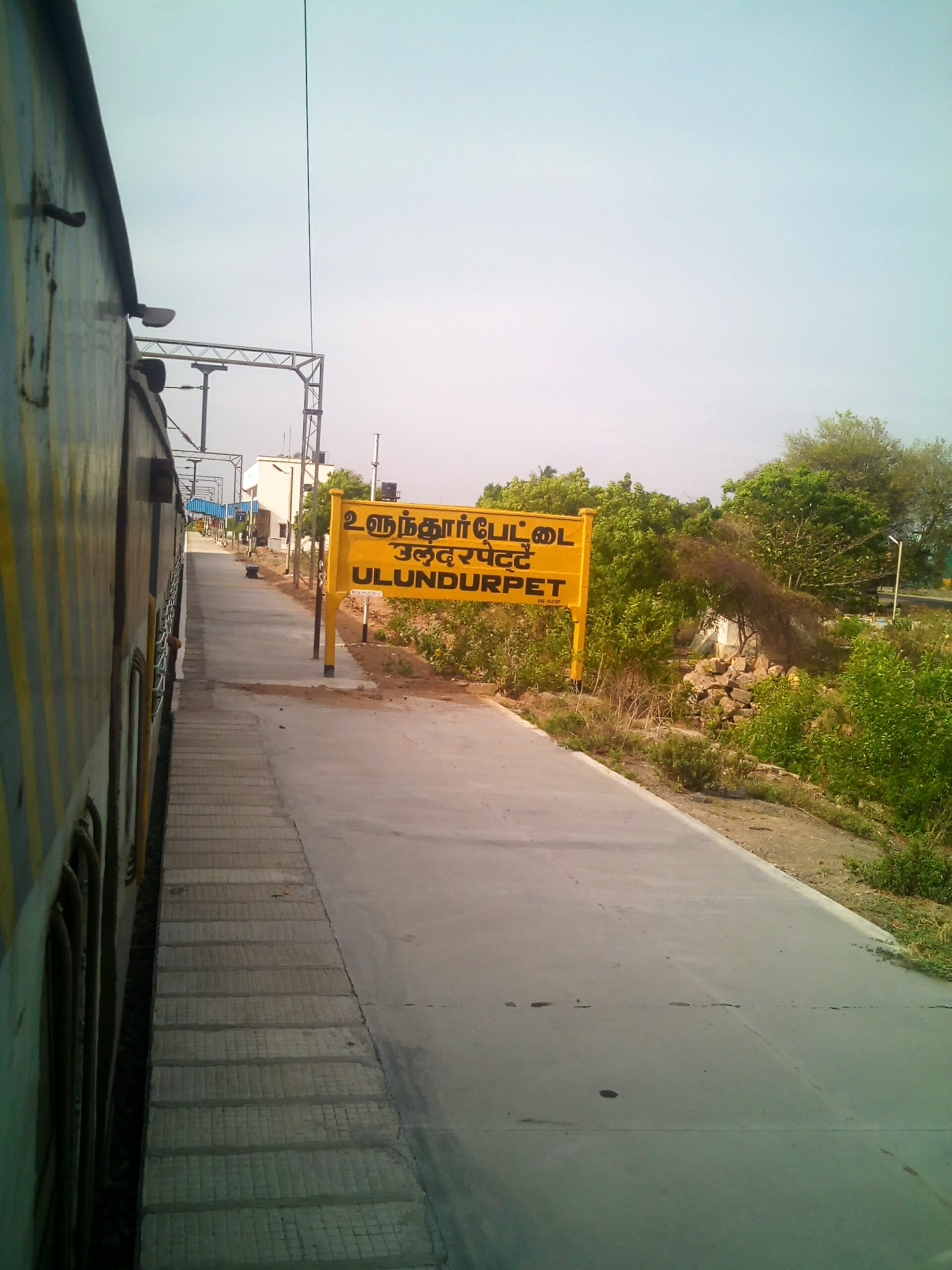
- Inside

General information
- Location: Thiruchi–Chennai Hwy, Ulundurpet, Kallakurichi district, Tamil Nadu; India
- Coordinates: 11.7021°N 79.3179°E
- Elevation: 66 metres (217 ft)
- System: Indian Railways station
- Owner: Indian Railways
- Operator: Southern Railway zone
- Line: Chord Line, Tamil Nadu
- Platforms: 2

Construction
- Structure type: Standard (on-ground station)

Other information
- Status: Functioning
- Station code: ULU
- Zone(s): Southern Railway zone
- Division(s): Tiruchirappalli
Location
- Location within India Location within Tamil Nadu

Ulundurpet/Ulundurpettai railway station (station code:ULU) is an NSG–6 category Indian railway station in Tiruchirappalli railway division of Southern Railway zone. It is a railway station on the Viluppuram–Tiruchirappalli section serving Ulundurpet, a town and taluka headquarters in Kallakurichi district, Tamil Nadu.

== Location and layout ==
It is located on the NH 45 near the Ulunderpet Toll Gate, one of the largest toll plazas in South India. The station has a two platform.

== Traffic ==
Of the numerous trains passing through the station, only the Madurai to Villupuram express has a commercial halt, despite Ulundupet being a town panchayat as well as the headquarters of both the Ulundurpet taluk and the Ulundurpet state assembly constituency.

The nearest major railheads are:

- Virudhachalam Junction (20 km)
- Viluppuram Junction (36 km)
