= Anganur, Kallakurichi =

Village in Tamil Nadu, India

Coordinates: 11.744740°N 79.236657°E

Anganur is a village in Ulundurpet taluka, Kallakurichi district, Tamil Nadu, India.
