= Veerabayangaram =

- Village
- Nickname: Veerangi
- Location in chinnasalem Tamil Nadu, India
- Coordinates: 11.5397°N 78.8741°E
- Country: India
- State: Tamil Nadu
- District: Kallakurichi district
- Named for: Temple

Government
  - Type: Village panchayat
  - Body: Village
  - Rank: 3
- Elevation: 500 m (1,600 ft)

Languages
  - Official: Tamil
- Time zone: UTC+5:30 (IST)
- PIN: 606301
- Vehicle registration: TN:15

Veerabayangaram is a village near Koogaiyur town in Chinnasalem block of Kallakurichi district, Tamil Nadu.

== Location ==
It is located at a distance of 80 km from Salem, Tamil Nadu.
