= Murarpalayam =

Murarbadu Murarpalayam, Murarbad
- village
- Location in Tamil Nadu, India Murarbadu (India)
- Coordinates: 11°55′32″N 78°53′14″E
- Country: India
- State: Tamil Nadu
- District: Kallakurichi District

Population
  - Total: 10,000

Languages
  - Official: Tamil
- Time zone: UTC+5:30 (IST)
- PIN: 606208
- Telephone code: 04151-230
- Vehicle registration: TN 15
- Nearest city: kallakurichi (10 km), salem (106 km)
- Literacy: 75%%
- Lok Sabha constituency: kallakurichi
- Vidhan Sabha constituency: sankarapuram
- Website: www.murarbadu.blogspot.com

Murarpalayam, also known as Murar Badu, is a large village in (sankarapuram taluk) of Kallakurichi District, in the Indian state of Tamil Nadu. It is located 9 km from Kallakurichi, the second largest city in the Viluppuram District.

Murarpalayam is famous for its educational level, with many engineers and doctors graduated from Government Municipality Schools (GHSS).

It has a large school campus and a playground around the municipal circle.

The village population consists mostly of Hindus and Muslims, with a very low percentage of Christians.

It is a shopping hub with many markets and retail stores and is also a hub of transport to major cities like Chennai, Bangalore, Salem, Trupathi and Thiruvannamalai.

This central village is surrounded by several smaller villages. weekly Friday farmer market.

It is near the Manimuthar River.

There is a Famous Mineral water company's and Country Chicken Poultry Farm, is in Murarbad, Paramanatham Road.

Friday Market on every Friday is very popular in Murarbadu. Farmers from surrounding villages come here with fresh fruits, vegetables, and poultry to sell..

One of the most important factors of this village is Murarabadu GHSC (Government Higher Secondary School). Here, many students come from nearby villages just because of the highly experienced teachers and a headmaster who strongly prioritises sports and extracurricular activities.

The famous Kalvarayan hill and Velli malai hill just 10 km distance only from this village. This village farmers pady and Cane mostly

Cultivation this village surroundings.

Commercials Karur Vysya Bank.

== Murarbad Culture ==
There are main holidays in Hindu: Pongal, Dewali and Vinayagar chadhurthy is celebrating

There are two main holidays in Islam: Eid Al-Fitr, Ramadan and Eid Al-Adha. Eid Al-Fitr is celebrated at the end of Ramadan (a month of fasting), and Muslims usually give zakat (charity) on the occasion. Eid Al-Adha is celebrated at the end of Hajj (annual pilgrimage to Mecca), which is one of the five pillars, and Muslims usually sacrifice an animal and distribute its meat among family, friends and the poor. All Islamic holidays follow the lunar calendar, and thus move each year relative to the solar calendar. The Islamic calendar has 12 months and 354 days on a regular year, and 355 days on a leap year.
