= T. Chinnasamy =

Member-Tamil Nadu Legislative Assembly.
- In office 1962–1967
- Preceded by: Nataraia Odayar
- Succeeded by: D. K. Naidu
- Constituency: Kallakurichi

Personal details
- Born: 1918 (age 107–108)
- Party: Dravida Munnetra Kazhagam
- Profession: Farmer

T. Chinnasamy (Venkatachalam) was an Indian politician and a former member of the Tamil Nadu Legislative Assembly. He hailed from the Chinnasalem area in the Kallakurichi district and received his education at the Chinnasalem Primary School. Representing the Dravida Munnetra Kazhagam (DMK) party, he contested and won the 1962 Tamil Nadu Legislative Assembly election from the Kallakurichi Assembly constituency to become a Member of the Legislative Assembly (MLA).

== Electoral Performance ==
=== 1962 ===
1962 Madras Legislative Assembly election: Kallakurichi
Party	Candidate	Votes	%	±%
DMK	T. Chinnasamy	25,084	48.76%	New
INC	P. Vedamanickam	18,837	36.61%	+14.85
SWA	K. Sadayan	4,537	8.82%	New
Independent	A. Kaliaperumal	2,989	5.81%	New
Margin of victory		6,247	12.14%	12.07%
Turnout		51,447	59.79%	−9.46%
Registered electors		91,264		
DMK gain from Independent		Swing	26.92%	
