= Rayappanur =

- Village
- Location in Tamil Nadu, India Rayappanur (India)
- Coordinates: 11.649546°N 78.859863°E
- Country: India
- State: Tamil Nadu
- District: Kallakurichi district
- Established: 8 Jan 2019
- Founder: Tamilnadu
- Named for: Sugarcane
- Headquarters: Kallakurichi
- Largest City: Kallakurichi

Government
  - Type: Council government
  - Collector: Mr.Kiran Gurrala, IAS
  - Superintendent of Police: Mr.Jayachandran, IPS

Population
  - Total: 3,688

Languages
  - Official: Tamil
- Time zone: UTC+5:30 (IST)
- PIN: 606201
- Telephone code: 04151
- Vehicle registration: TN-15

Rayappanur is a village in Kallakurichi district, Tamil Nadu, India.

== Location ==
- Post : Melnariyappanur
- Taluk : Chinnasalem
- pin code : 606201
