= Mepuliyur =

Coordinates: 11.6550°N 79.3508°E

Meppuliyur is a village in Ulundurpet Taluk, Kallakurichi district, Tamil Nadu, India. The rural population depends on agriculture. The village, town, and vankanar slum colony is divided into three parts. People speak Tamil and Telugu.
