= Melnariyappanur =

- Village
- Location in Tamil Nadu, India Melnariyappanur (India)
- Coordinates: 11.649546°N 78.859863°E
- Country: India
- State: Tamil Nadu
- District: Kallakurichi

Area
  - Total: 13.60 km^{2} (5.25 sq mi)

Population (2006)
  - Total: 35,000
  - Density: 1,435/km^{2} (3,720/sq mi)

Languages
  - Official: Tamil
- Time zone: UTC+5:30 (IST)
- PIN: 606201
- Telephone code: 04151
- Vehicle registration: TN-15

Melnariyappanur is a village panchayat located near Chinnasalem taluk of Kallakurichi district, Tamil Nadu. It is famous for the shrine dedicated to the King of Miracles, Saint Antony of Padua. His feast is celebrated every year on 13 June. People in the area cultivate turmeric, rice, corn, cotton, green chilis, pulses, tapioca sugar, tamarind, and yellow lentils.

== Transport ==
Melnariyappanur is located 3 km away from V.Kootroad, National Highway NH-68 (Salem-Ulundurpet). Buses are available from Melnariyappanur to Chennai and Mini buses from Siruvachur to V.Kootroad via Melnariyappanur.

Train route connecting Salem (SA) and Vridhachalam (VRI) goes via Melnariyappanur (MLYR). Only passenger trains stop here. The nearest major station is at Chinnasalem (CHSM). Trains are available from Bangalore, Mangalore and Salem.

== Schools ==
Schools in the area include

- St. Antony's Higher Secondary School -
- Government Primary School

== Air links ==
The nearest domestic airport is Salem Airport, 85 km west of the town, Pondicherry 130 km, Madurai 240 km and Coimbatore 240 km. Domestic and international airports are at Tiruchirapalli 100 km, Chennai 250 km, and Bangalore 285 km

== Places of interest ==
The Kalvarayan Ranges, located about 5 to 10 km north of the village, include Chinna Thirupathi (meaning "small Tirupathi"), a hill.
