= Thiagadurgam =

Coordinates: 11°45′00″N 79°04′42″E

Thiyagadurgam
- Selection Grade Town Panchayat
- Interactive map of Thiyagadurgam
- Country: India
- State: Tamil Nadu
- District: Kallakurichi

Government
  - Body: elected body

Area
  - Total: 11.69 km^{2} (4.51 sq mi)
  - Rank: 1

Population (2011)
  - Total: 18,764
  - Density: 1,605/km^{2} (4,157/sq mi)

Languages Tamil
  - Official: Tamil
- Time zone: UTC+5:30 (IST)
- Postal code: 606206
- Vehicle registration: TN-32, TN-15

Thiyagadurgam is a selection grade panchayat town in Kallakurichi district in the Indian state of Tamil Nadu.

== Governance ==
This town includes 15 wards and 113 streets. Total area is 11.69 km^{2}. The population as of the 2011 census was 18,764. Thiyagadurgam, a Selection Grade Town Panchayat in Kallakurichi district is located northeast of Kallakurichi and 12 km west of Kallakurichi. Villupuram, Cuddalore, and Pondicherry on the east and Thirukovilur, Thiruvannamalai on the north and Kallakurichi, Athur, and Salem on the west are the major urban centers, well connected with this town through districts roads and national Highways (NH 65, NH45) line.

Thiyagadurgam is geographically located at 120 13’ north latitude and at 730 37’ east longitudes. It is 6.24 meters above the sea level. The town is bounded by Udhayamampattu on the north, Gandhi Nagar and Periyamampattu on the East, Pukkulam on the south. Population 2011

Thiyagadurgam has a population of 18,764 as per 2011 census, consisting of 9,467 males and 9,297 females. The town spreads over an extent of 11.65 Kilometers, including 15 wards and 113 streets.

== History ==
Thiyagadurgam Town Panchayat was a build in Panchayat in 1953. In 1954 it became a 1st Grade Town Panchayat and then in 1982 it became a Selection Grade Town Panchayat.

A small hill is in the middle of the town, and a fort sits on the hill. While under the control of Hyder Ali in 1771 AD, it was taken over by the British ruler. Before the British took over the fort, Tipu Sultan ruled. The fort later served as a base for British rule.

== Transport ==
The town is connected by National Highway 79 to Ulundurpet and Salem. TNSTC Buses connect Chennai to Salem and Kallakurichi. The nearest railway station is 26 km away at Ulundurpet.
