= Chennai–Tiruchirappalli Expressway =

Indian expressway connecting Chennai and Tiruchirappalli

- Chennai–Trichy Greenfield Expressway

Route information
- Maintained by National Highways Authority of India (NHAI)
- Length: 310 km (190 mi)
- Existed: Under construction–present

Major junctions
- North end: NH 45 near Chennai, Tamil Nadu
- South end: Tiruchirappalli, Tamil Nadu

Location
- Country: India
- States: Tamil Nadu
- Major cities: Chennai, Chengalpattu, Tindivanam, Villupuram, Ulundurpet, Perambalur, Tiruchirappalli

Highway system
- Expressways of India / Bharatmala Pariyojana

The Chennai–Tiruchirappalli Expressway (also known as the Chennai–Trichy Greenfield Expressway) is an under-construction, 310-kilometre-long (190 mi), six-lane-wide (expandable to 8-lane), access-controlled, greenfield expressway in the state of Tamil Nadu, India. The expressway is designed to connect the state capital, Chennai, to the central economic and geographic hub of Tiruchirappalli (Trichy). Once completed, it is expected to significantly reduce the current travel time between the two cities from approximately 6–7 hours to around 3 hours.

The project is being developed under Phase II of the Bharatmala Pariyojana national highway development programme, overseen by the Ministry of Road Transport and Highways (MoRTH) and the National Highways Authority of India (NHAI). It serves as a high-speed greenfield alternative to the heavily congested National Highway 45 (NH-45) corridor.

== Route alignment ==
The greenfield alignment passes entirely through the state of Tamil Nadu, spanning across multiple key industrial and agricultural districts. The northern terminus begins near the outer periphery of Chennai (connecting into the broader regional highway network) and trends southward. It bypasses heavily populated urban nodes to minimize land acquisition costs, tracing a route close to Chengalpattu, Tindivanam, Villupuram, Ulundurpet, and Perambalur, before reaching its southern terminus at Tiruchirappalli.

== Special features ==
- Design Capacity: Built initially as a six-lane access-controlled highway, with provisions to scale up to an eight-lane configuration as traffic density escalates.
- Major Structures: The project timeline incorporates a new major bridge across the Cauvery River near its southern terminal, alongside multiple flyovers, pedestrian underpasses, and cattle crossings.
- Connectivity Extensions: Future phases of regional alignment propose a spur route connecting Trichy to Thanjavur, extending onward via a 4-lane link toward Pillaiyarpatti and closing with a 160-kilometre (99 mi) expressway to Thoothukudi (Tuticorin), generating a comprehensive industrial transport network for the state.

== Timeline ==
- February 2023: The Ministry of Road Transport and Highways (MoRTH) accelerated the preparation of Detailed Project Reports (DPRs) for major expressways proposed under Bharatmala Phase II, listing the 310-kilometre (190 mi) baseline project at an estimated baseline cost of ₹30,000–35,000 crore.
- July 2026: NHAI officially commenced ground alignment, soil testing, and primary construction stages for the revised 300-kilometre (190 mi) access-controlled corridor. Total finalized costs were structured at ₹20,000 crore. Tamil Nadu state ministries pledged to fast-track remaining environmental clearances across forest tracks and local hillocks.

== See also ==
- Expressways of India
- Chennai–Salem Expressway
- National Highway 45 (India)
