= Manimuthar River =

Manimuthar is the name of four different rivers in Tamil Nadu, India:

- Manimuthar River (tributary of Thamirabarani)
- Manimuthar River (tributary of Pambar), a river of Tamil Nadu
- Manimuthar River (tributary of Vellar), a river of Tamil Nadu
- Thirumanimutharu River (tributary of Kaveri)

== See also ==
- Manimuktha River, a tributary of the Vellar River in Tamil Nadu
