= Arul Vignesh =

Indian politician (born 1991)

Chinnaiya Arul Vignesh (born 1991) is an Indian politician from Tamil Nadu. He is a member of the Tamil Nadu Legislative Assembly from the Kallakurichi Assembly constituency, which is reserved for Scheduled Caste community in Kallakurichi district, representing the Tamilaga Vettri Kazhagam.

Vignesh is from Kallakurichi, Tamil Nadu. He is the son of Chinnaiya. He M.Sc. in life sciences and passed out in 2012 from Bharathidasan University. He declared Rs.1 crore in his affidavit to the Election Commission of India.

== Career ==
Vignesh won the Kallakurichi Assembly constituency representing the Tamilaga Vettri Kazhagam in the 2026 Tamil Nadu Legislative Assembly election. He polled 81,132 votes and defeated his nearest rival, S. Rajeevgandhi of the All India Anna Dravida Munnetra Kazhagam, by a margin of 798 votes.

== Controversies ==
In November 2026, Arul Vignesh faced allegations of making inappropriate remarks towards Kallakurichi District Collector J. E. Padmaja. Villupuram Range DIG A. Arularasu stated that the Chief Minister's Office and senior ministers had warned the MLA following concerns raised by the Collector through official channels. Allegations of harassment and an unauthorised visit to the Collector's official residence were also reported, although police officials stated that no formal criminal complaint had been filed.
