= Kallakurichi Assembly constituency =

State Legislative Assembly Constituency in Tamil Nadu

Coordinates: 11.738°N 78.962°E

Kallakurichi
- Constituency No. 80 for the Tamil Nadu Legislative Assembly

Constituency details
- Country: India
- Region: South India
- State: Tamil Nadu
- District: Kallakurichi
- Lok Sabha constituency: Kallakurichi
- Established: 1951
- Total electors: 2,81,622
- Reservation: SC

Member of Legislative Assembly
- 17th Tamil Nadu Legislative Assembly
- Incumbent Arul Vignesh C
- Party: TVK
- Elected year: 2026

Kallakurichi is a state assembly constituency in Tamil Nadu, India. Its State Assembly Constituency number is 80. Located in Kallakurichi district, it consists of a portion of Kallakkurichi taluk. It is a part of Kallakurichi Lok Sabha constituency for national elections to the Parliament of India. It is one of the 234 State Legislative Assembly Constituencies in Tamil Nadu.

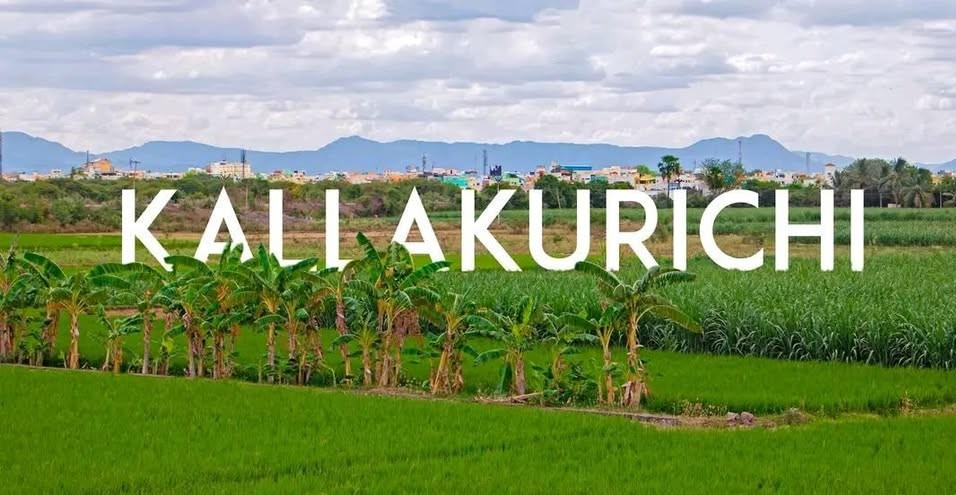
Kallakurichi Assembly Constituency

Previously in existence for the elections from 1951 to 1971, inclusive, it was converted into Chinnasalem Assembly constituency for the 1977 election. It came into existence again for the 2011 election following the reorganisation of constituencies in 2008. The seat is reserved for candidates from the Scheduled Castes.

Sugarcane is famous in Kallakurichi district.

== Members of Legislative Assembly ==
Year	Member	Political party
Madras State
1952	Elaya Pillai	Independent
1957	Natarajan Udayar	Independent
1962	T. Chinnasamy	Dravida Munnetra Kazhagam
1967	D. Kesavalu	Dravida Munnetra Kazhagam
Tamil Nadu
1971	D. Kesavalu	Dravida Munnetra Kazhagam
2011	K. Alaguvel Babu	All India Anna Dravida Munnetra Kazhagam
2016	A. Prabhu	All India Anna Dravida Munnetra Kazhagam
2021	M. Senthilkumar	All India Anna Dravida Munnetra Kazhagam
2026	C. Arul Vignesh	Tamilaga Vettri Kazhagam

== Election results ==
Vote share of winning candidates
2026	32.50%
2021	49.26%
2016	42.16%
2011	62.18%
1971	52.84%
1967	56.38%
1962	48.76%
1957	21.84%
1952	19.25%

=== 2026 ===
2026 Tamil Nadu Legislative Assembly election: Kallakurichi
Party	Candidate	Votes	%	±%
TVK	Arul Vignesh C	81,132	32.50	New
AIADMK	Rajeevgandhi S	80,334	32.18	▼17.08
VCK	Malathi K	77,666	31.11	New
NTK	Nagammal Rajkodi	7,494	3.00	▼4.33
NOTA	NOTA	883	0.35	▼0.21
Independent	Vignesh G	653	0.26	New
Independent	Vasanthakumar S	417	0.17	New
Independent	Rajivgandhi P	308	0.12	New
Independent	Selvaraj M	219	0.09	New
Independent	Rajivgandhi S	196	0.08	New
Independent	Malathi K	179	0.07	New
Independent	Prabu C	145	0.06	New
Margin of victory		798	0.32	▼11.21
Turnout		2,49,626	88.64	▲10.28
Registered electors		2,81,622		▼4,999
TVK gain from AIADMK		Swing	▲32.50	

=== 2021 ===
2021 Tamil Nadu Legislative Assembly election: Kallakurichi
Party	Candidate	Votes	%	±%
AIADMK	M. Senthilkumar	110,643	49.26%	+7.1
INC	K. I. Manirathinem	84,752	37.73%	New
NTK	D. Dravida Muthamilselvi	16,474	7.33%	+6.78
DMDK	N. Vijayakumar	6,571	2.93%	New
NOTA	NOTA	1,257	0.56%	−0.85
Independent	K. Devimangayarkarasi	1,197	0.53%	New
Margin of victory		25,891	11.53%	9.61%
Turnout		224,601	78.36%	−2.55%
Rejected ballots		168	0.07%	
Registered electors		286,621		
AIADMK hold		Swing	7.10%	

=== 2016 ===
2016 Tamil Nadu Legislative Assembly election: Kallakurichi
Party	Candidate	Votes	%	±%
AIADMK	A. Prabhu	90,108	42.16%	−20.02
DMK	P. Kamaraj	86,004	40.24%	New
VCK	S. Ramamoorththy	17,492	8.18%	New
PMK	R. Senthamilselvi	9,736	4.56%	New
NOTA	NOTA	3,008	1.41%	New
Independent	A. Ranganathan	2,085	0.98%	New
KMDK	R. Chandiran	1,892	0.89%	New
IJK	K. Elayaperumal	1,309	0.61%	New
NTK	C. Mariyappan	1,181	0.55%	New
Margin of victory		4,104	1.92%	−31.62%
Turnout		213,719	80.91%	−1.44%
Registered electors		264,140		
AIADMK hold		Swing	-20.02%	

=== 2011 ===
2011 Tamil Nadu Legislative Assembly election: Kallakurichi
Party	Candidate	Votes	%	±%
AIADMK	K. Alaguvelu	111,249	62.18%	New
VCK	A. C. Pavarasu	51,251	28.65%	New
Independent	K. Natesan	4,031	2.25%	New
IJK	K. Arivukkarasu	3,246	1.81%	New
Independent	M. Senthilkumar	2,425	1.36%	New
Independent	V. Ananthi	2,246	1.26%	New
BSP	M. Dinesh	1,481	0.83%	New
BJP	N. Rajesh	1,192	0.67%	New
Independent	M. Gurusamy	1,025	0.57%	New
Margin of victory		59,998	33.54%	
Turnout		178,906	82.35%	
Registered electors		217,252		
AIADMK win (new seat)				

=== 1971 ===
1971 Tamil Nadu Legislative Assembly election: Kallakurichi
Party	Candidate	Votes	%	±%
DMK	D. Kesavalu	38,513	52.84%	−3.54
INC	S. Sivaraman	34,374	47.16%	+5.94
Margin of victory		4,139	5.68%	−9.48%
Turnout		72,887	76.66%	−6.61%
Registered electors		97,988		
DMK hold		Swing	-3.54%	

=== 1967 ===
1967 Madras Legislative Assembly election: Kallakurichi
Party	Candidate	Votes	%	±%
DMK	D. K. Naidu	39,175	56.38%	+7.62
INC	V. T. Elayapillai	28,642	41.22%	+4.6
Independent	M. Muthuvel	1,261	1.81%	New
Independent	K. K. V. Rao	409	0.59%	New
Margin of victory		10,533	15.16%	3.02%
Turnout		69,487	83.27%	23.48%
Registered electors		86,613		
DMK hold		Swing	7.62%	

=== 1962 ===
1962 Madras Legislative Assembly election: Kallakurichi
Party	Candidate	Votes	%	±%
DMK	T. Chinnasamy	25,084	48.76%	New
INC	P. Vedamanickam	18,837	36.61%	+14.85
SWA	K. Sadayan	4,537	8.82%	New
Independent	A. Kaliaperumal	2,989	5.81%	New
Margin of victory		6,247	12.14%	12.07%
Turnout		51,447	59.79%	−9.46%
Registered electors		91,264		
DMK gain from Independent		Swing	26.92%	

=== 1957 ===
1957 Madras Legislative Assembly election: Kallakurichi
Party	Candidate	Votes	%	±%
Independent	Nataraia Odayar	25,020	21.84%	New
INC	Parthasarathi	24,939	21.77%	+3.2
Independent	M. Anandan	24,099	21.03%	New
Independent	Narayanasami (Sc)	8,331	7.27%	New
Independent	Alamelu	5,238	4.57%	New
Independent	Thandavarayan (Sc)	4,290	3.74%	New
Margin of victory		81	0.07%	−0.62%
Turnout		114,582	69.25%	−14.84%
Registered electors		165,468		
Independent hold		Swing	2.58%	

=== 1952 ===
1952 Madras Legislative Assembly election: Kallakurichi
Party	Candidate	Votes	%	±%
Independent	Elaya Pillai	25,799	19.25%	New
INC	Anandan	24,874	18.56%	New
TTP	Rathainam	15,259	11.39%	New
Independent	Pavadi	12,336	9.21%	New
Independent	Munusami	6,946	5.18%	New
Margin of victory		925	0.69%	
Turnout		134,006	84.09%	
Registered electors		159,369		
Independent win (new seat)				
