= Mattigaikurichi =

- Village
- Location in Tamil Nadu, India
- Coordinates: 11.7517333°N 78.912720°E
- Country: India
- State: Tamil Nadu
- District: Kallakurichi

Government
  - Body: Village Panchayat

Population (2011)
  - Total: 1,658

Languages
  - Official: Tamil
- Time zone: UTC+5:30 (IST)
- PIN: 606 207
- Telephone code: 0-4151
- Vehicle registration: TN 15

Mattigaikurichi is a village in Kallakurichi District in State of Tamil Nadu, India.

This small village is located on the north bank of the river Gomuki, It is 6 km away from Kallakurichi, in Sankarapuram Taluk, Villupuram District.

As per 2011 India census, Mattigaikurichi had a population of 1658. Males constitute 49% of the population and females 51%. Most of the villagers are farmers.

There is an elementary school, built by the villagers and since 1969 there has also been a Government Middle school.

== Demographics ==
Census
Religion	Percent(%)
Female Population	51.1%
Male Population	48.9%
Total Literacy	60.0 %
Female Literacy	25.4 %
Male Literacy	73%

According to 2011 census, Mattigaikurichi had a population of 1658 with a sex-ratio of 848 Females & 810 Males. The average literacy of the village was 67.08% and there were a total of 1300 workers, comprising 840 cultivators, 400 main agricultural labourers.

== Climate ==
The climate is moderate to hot, with the maximum temperature being 38 °C and the minimum at 21 °C. The Village gets its rainfall from the northeast monsoon during the winter months and the southwest monsoon during the summer months. The average annual rainfall is 1,070 mm.
