= Arungurukkai =

- Village
- Interactive map of Arungurukkai
- Country: India
- State: Tamil Nadu
- District: Kallakurichi

Population
  - Total: 4,703
  - Male: 2,363
  - Female: 2,340
- PIN code: 605803
- Location code: 633199

Arungurukkai village is located in Tirukkoyilur tehsil of Kallakurichi district in Tamil Nadu, India. It is situated 16km away from Tirukkoyilur. As per 2009 stats, Arungurukkai village is also a gram panchayat.

The total geographical area of the village is 718.84 hectares. Arungurukkai has a total population of 4,703 people. There are about 1,003 houses in Arungurukkai village. Tirukkoyilur is the nearest town to Arungurukkai.
