= Vilandai =

- village
- Location in Tamil Nadu, India Vilandai (India)
- Coordinates: 11.98133°N 79.15697°E
- Country: India
- State: Tamil Nadu
- District: Kallakurichi

Languages
  - Official: Tamil
- Time zone: UTC+5:30 (IST)
- PIN: 605756
- Telephone code: 04153
- Vehicle registration: TN-32
- Nearest city: Thirukovilur

Vilandai is a village in Kallakurichi district, Tamil Nadu, India. It is situated 8 km away from Thirukovilur. It is in SH 9 of Thirukovilur to Thiruvannamalai road via Manalurpettai. It is 190 km away from the state capital, Chennai. The area postal pin code is 605756.

The local economy is based on agriculture. Water is supplied by Sathanur Dam.

The South Pennaru River passes through Villandai. It has one Government High School and Panchayath School.

It comes under the Thirukovilur constituency for state elections and Villupuram constituency for lok sabha elections. In 2017 it had a population of more than 5000.
