= Vadakkanandal =

- town
- Location in Tamil Nadu, India
- Coordinates: 11.777°N 78.864°E
- Country: India
- State: Tamil Nadu
- District: Kallakurichi

Population (2001)
  - Total: 19,857

Languages
  - Official: Tamil
- Time zone: UTC+5:30 (IST)
- PIN: 606207
- Vehicle registration: TN-15

Vadakkanandal is a Selection Grade Town Panchayat in Kallakurichi district in the Indian state of Tamil Nadu.

== Demographics ==
Vadakanandal is one of the biggest and fastest developing Panchayat towns in Chinnasalem Taluk. The agriculture is the backbone of the village. As of 2011 India census, Vadakkanandal had a population of 23,034. Males constitute 51% of the population and females 49%. Vadakkanandal has an average literacy rate of 61%, higher than the national average of 59.5%: male literacy is 72%, and female literacy is 49%. In Vadakkanandal, 12% of the population is under 6 years of age.
