= Ennayiram =

- Location in Tamil Nadu, India
- 12°07′36″N 79°29′27″E
- Location: Villuppuram, India

Ennayiram is a village in Vikravandi taluk in Villuppuram district in the Indian state of Tamil Nadu. The major occupation of the people living at this place is agriculture.

== Etymology ==
Ennayiram means eight thousand in Tamil. An inscription dated 1025 CE, belongs to the Rajaraja Chola mentions the name "Ennayiram". Hence the name "Ennayiram" is 1000 years old. It also refers to the caste name of Jain merchants. It has close connection with Ashtasahasram, a sub sect of Tamil Iyer community.

== Information ==
- Name of the Place = Ennayiram
- Taluk = Vikiravandi
- District = Villupuram
- State = Tamil Nadu
- Country = India
- Coordinates = 12°7'28"N 79°29'31"E
- Area = 1 km^{2}
- Population = 1000 (2011)

== Location ==
Ennayiram is located 20 km north of Villupuram, 16 km southeast of Gingee.

== Transportation ==
Town buses from Villupuram town bus stand (bus no: 20, 21) to Pidaripattu go through Ennayiram. Otherwise, one can alight at Nemur Koot road bus stop (all mofussil buses going from Villupuram to Gingee) and can take shared auto.

== About the village ==
Ennayiram village has more than 1000 years old heritage. This village was a city during the Rajaraja Chola I period. It was dominated by Jains before the arrival of Ramanuja. It is also believed that Saint Ramanuja had converted eight thousand Jains to Vaishnavites here. It was called Rajaraja Sathuurvedimangalam in those times. The main importance of this village comes from Azhagiya Narasimma Perumal temple, a Vedic college and Ennayira malai which contains evidence for the past existence of Jain monks. Tamil poet Kalamegam was born in this village.

== Azhagiya Narasimma Perumal Temple ==
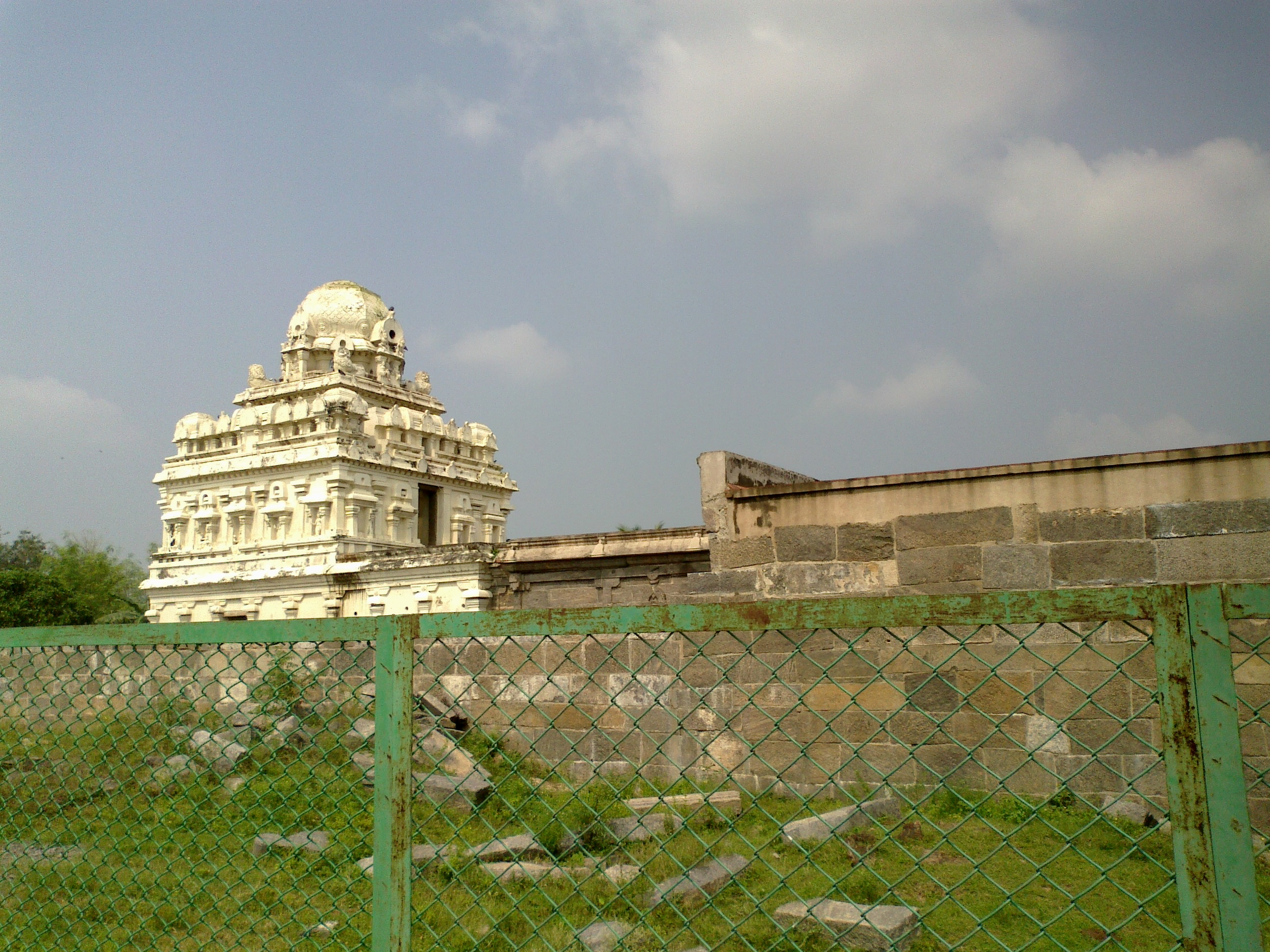
Azhagiya Narasimma Perumal Temple

This temple was built by Raja Raja Chola and Narasimma Perumal was considered as the family deity of Rajaraja Chola. The sanctum sanctorum has the idol of Lord Paramapathavasan and consorts Sridevi and Bhoodevi. The presiding deity is Lord Azhagiya Narasimmar. The temple also has a shrine for the six foot high idol of Lord Varahamurthy. Special pooja is performed in every Thiruvathirai Natchathiram day. Sadly, vandalism have dismembered the two hands of Lord Narasimmar which are made of green stone. The deity has been kept in a corner of the temple for the past 400 years. Saint Ramanuja visited this temple twice. Koorathazhwar also visited this temple. This temple contains many Tamil inscriptions on the walls and stairs. It is surrounded by three Shiva temples namely Padaleeswarar temple, Brahmmapuriswarar temple at Brahmadesam and Ramanatha Eswarar temple at Esalam. All three Shiva temples are within two kilometers. All these temples are now under the control of Archaeological Survey of India (ASI).

== Existence of ancient Vedic College ==
The Vedic College functioned with 10 teachers and 340 students 800 years ago. The college provided free boarding to students and each student received one seer (unit) of rice per day which was sufficient for their daily meals. The teachers got a daily allowance of one kalam which was equivalent to the cost of food for 16 persons per day. They were also given half kalingu gold as bonus per year. The village was also called as rajaraja chaturvedi Mangalam because the vedic college taught chaturdasa (3 vedas with 6 angam and meemasa, nyayam, puranam and dharmasaasthram). References of the same is found in 1st Rajendra chola’s (11th century) Sassanam.

== Ennayira Malai (Ancient Jain cave, beds and inscriptions) ==
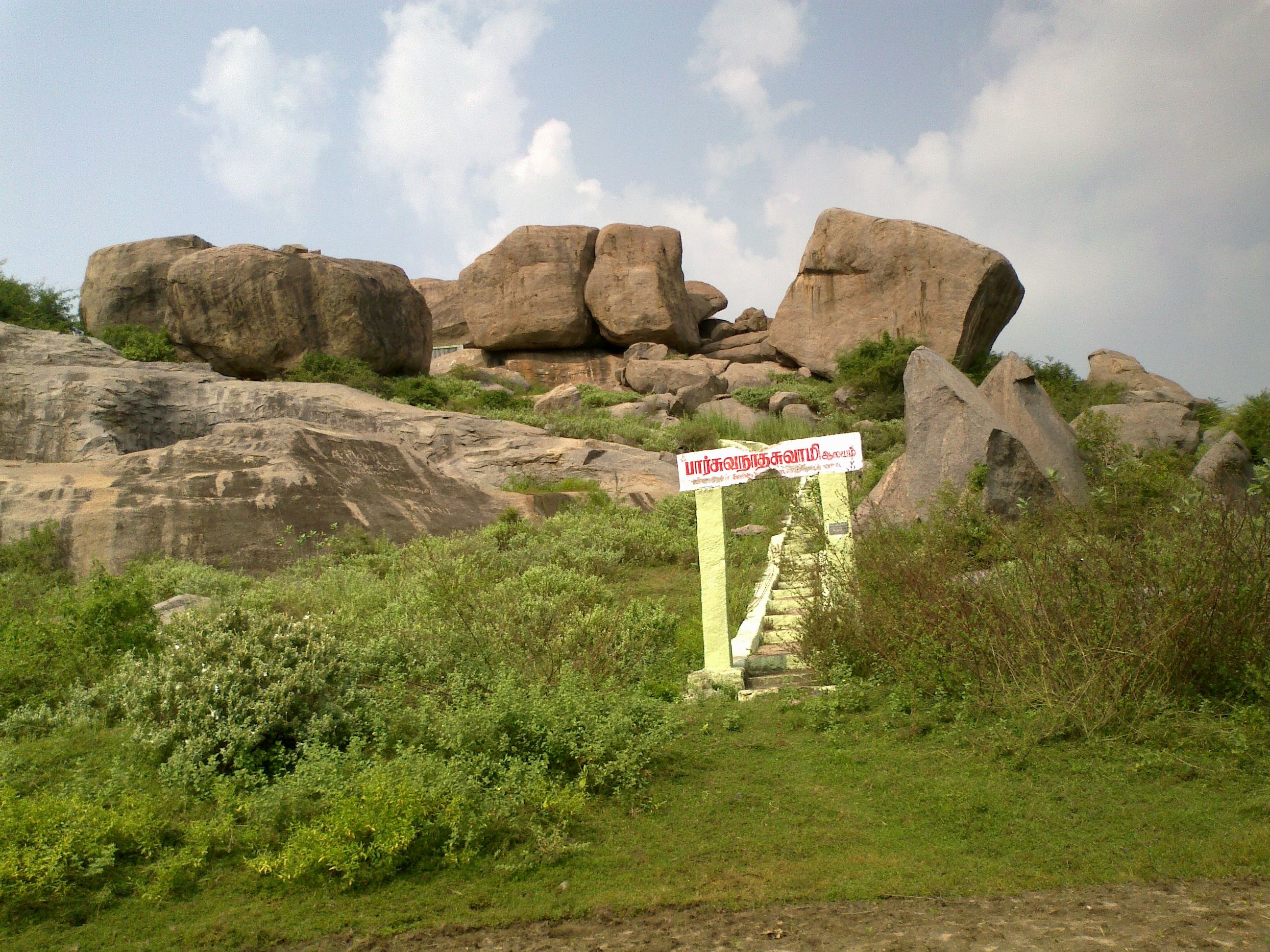
Ennayira Malai

Another attractive feature of this village is the presence of Ennayira malai or Ennayiram hill with Jain cave and beds, which is now called as Koodalur hill. The 23rd Thirthankarar of Jainism, Parshavanathar, was nicely carved on the rock. There are 35 stone beds, a natural cave and five Tamil inscriptions. Among the five inscriptions, one belongs to the period of the Pallava king Nirubathunga Varman (850 to 882 CE), while the remaining four belong to the period of Chola King Parantaka Chola I (907 to 953 CE). Near the hill, broken black and red painted pots from 1st to 2nd centuries CE were found in large numbers.

== See also ==
- Jainism
- Ramanuja
- Cholapandiyapuram
- Jambai (Tirukkoyilur)
