= Kallakkurichi division =

Kallakkurichi district revenue division

Coordinates: 11.738°N 78.962°E

Kallakurichi division is a revenue division in the Kallakurichi district of Tamil Nadu, India.
