= Sadayampattu =

Village in Tamil Nadu, India

Coordinates: 11.752°N 78.921°E

Sadayampattu is a village in Kallakurichi district of Tamil Nadu, India. The entire village is surrounded by 3 lakes and in the middle of the village is the Gomukhi river. People are engaged with agricultural activities, the main crops are paddy, sugarcane, cotton, sago and others.
