= Manimuktha River =

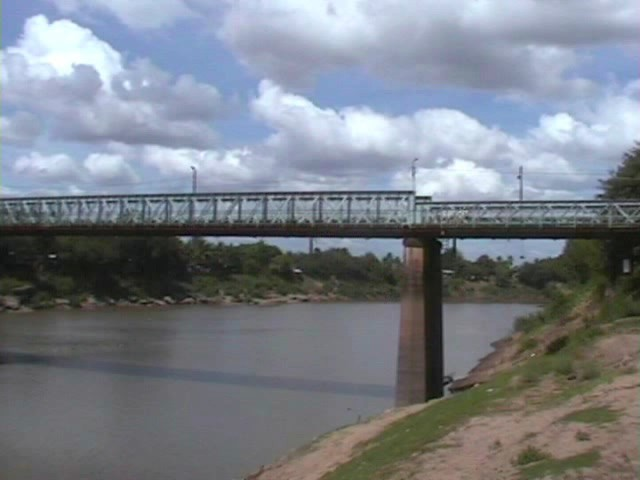
- A bridge over the Manimuktha River at Veerasolapuram.

- The Vellar River river system, including the Manimuktha River

- Location of the river mouth in Tamil Nadu Manimuktha River (India)

Location
- Country: India
- State: Tamil Nadu
- Districts: Kallakurichi, Cuddalore
- Taluks: Sankarapuram, Kallakkurichi, Vriddachalam

Physical characteristics
- Source: Confluence of Mani River and Muktha River
  - location: Sankarapuram taluk, Kallakurichi district
  - coordinates: 11°49′21″N 78°58′01″E
  - elevation: 125 m (410 ft)
- Mouth: Confluence with Vellar River
  - location: Vriddachalam taluk, Cuddalore district
  - coordinates: 11°25′01″N 79°27′50″E
  - elevation: 20 m (66 ft)

Basin features
- Progression: Vellar River→ Bay of Bengal
- River system: Vellar River drainage basin
- Tributaries
  - right: Gomukhi River, Periya River

The Manimuktha River is a river in the Kallakurichi and Cuddalore districts of the Indian state of Tamil Nadu.

== See also ==
List of rivers of Tamil Nadu
