= M. Senthilkumar =

Indian politician

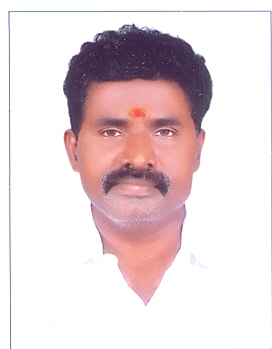

Member of the Tamil Nadu Legislative Assembly
- In office 2 May 2021 – 4 May 2026
- Preceded by: A. Prabhu
- Constituency: Kallakurichi

Personal details
- Party: All India Anna Dravida Munnetra Kazhagam

M. Senthilkumar is an Indian politician. He is a member of the All India Anna Dravida Munnetra Kazhagam party. He was elected as a member of Tamil Nadu Legislative Assembly from Kallakurichi Constituency in May 2021.

== Electoral performance ==
2021 Tamil Nadu Legislative Assembly election: Kallakurichi
Party	Candidate	Votes	%	±%
AIADMK	M. Senthilkumar	110,643	49.26%	+7.1
INC	K. I. Manirathinem	84,752	37.73%	New
NTK	D. Dravida Muthamilselvi	16,474	7.33%	+6.78
DMDK	N. Vijayakumar	6,571	2.93%	New
NOTA	NOTA	1,257	0.56%	−0.85
Independent	K. Devimangayarkarasi	1,197	0.53%	New
Margin of victory		25,891	11.53%	9.61%
Turnout		224,601	78.36%	−2.55%
Rejected ballots		168	0.07%	
Registered electors		286,621		
AIADMK hold		Swing	7.10%	
