= Rishivandiyam =

Coordinates: 11.817°N 79.100°E

- Town Panchayat
- Interactive map of Rishivandiyam
- Country: India
- State: Tamil Nadu
- District: Kallakurichi

Government
  - Body: Rishivandiyam

Population (2001)
  - Total: 18,665

Languages
  - Official: Tamil
- Time zone: UTC+5:30 (IST)
- PIN: 606205
- Telephone code: 04151
- Vehicle registration: TN-15
- Coastline: 60 kilometres (37 mi)
- Nearest city: Kallakurichi
- Sex ratio: 0.98 ♂/♀
- Literacy: 72%
- Lok Sabha constituency: Kallakurichi
- Civic agency: Rishivandiyam
- Climate: Temperate (Köppen)
- Avg. summer temperature: 35 °C (95 °F)
- Avg. winter temperature: 30 °C (86 °F)

Rishivandiyam is a Village panchayat in Vanapuram Taluk of Kallakurichi district in the state of Tamil Nadu, India. Rishivandhiyam is one of the 20 blocks of Kallakurichi, and has 43 panchayat villages in it.

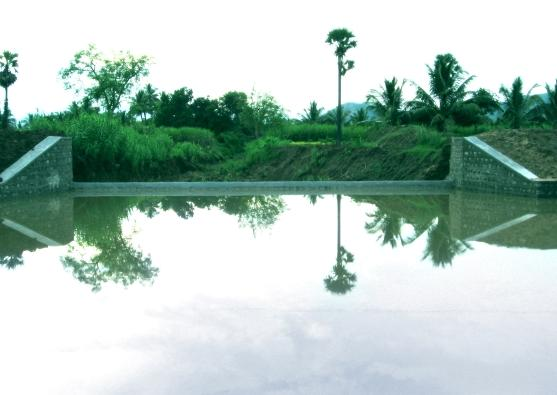
Lake of Rishivandiyam

Elections and winners in the constituency are listed below.

== Demographics ==
Total population: 118,665
Male: 59,905
Female: 58,760

Vijayakanth emerged victorious from the Rishivandhiyam constituency in the 2011 state assembly elections. S. Sivaraj Mudaliyar who won four times in this constituency.

== Co ordination and location ==
Latitude: 11.817
Longitude: 79.100
UTM: KU90
Geographical coordinates in decimal degrees (WGS84)
