= Ammaiyagaram =

Coordinates: 10°49′43″N 78°59′56″E

Ammaiyagaram is a village in the Thanjavur district of Tamil Nadu, India. It is situated in the Kaveri delta region. Nearby towns are Thirukattupalli (9 km), Budalur (8 km) and Thanjavur (21 km).
