= Kallakkurichi taluk =

Coordinates: 11.738°N 78.962°E

Kallakurichi taluk is a taluk of Kallakurichi district of the Indian state of Tamil Nadu. The headquarters of the taluk is the town of Kallakurichi.

== Demographics ==
According to the 2011 census, the taluk of Kallakurichi had a population of 465,236 with 230,440 males and 234,796 females. There were 981 men for every 1,000 women. The taluk had a literacy rate of 63.49%. Child population in the age group below 6 years were 23,890 Males and 26,388 Females.
