= Gomukhi River =

It's the main water resource of kallakurichi

Coordinates: 18°42′N 83°18′E

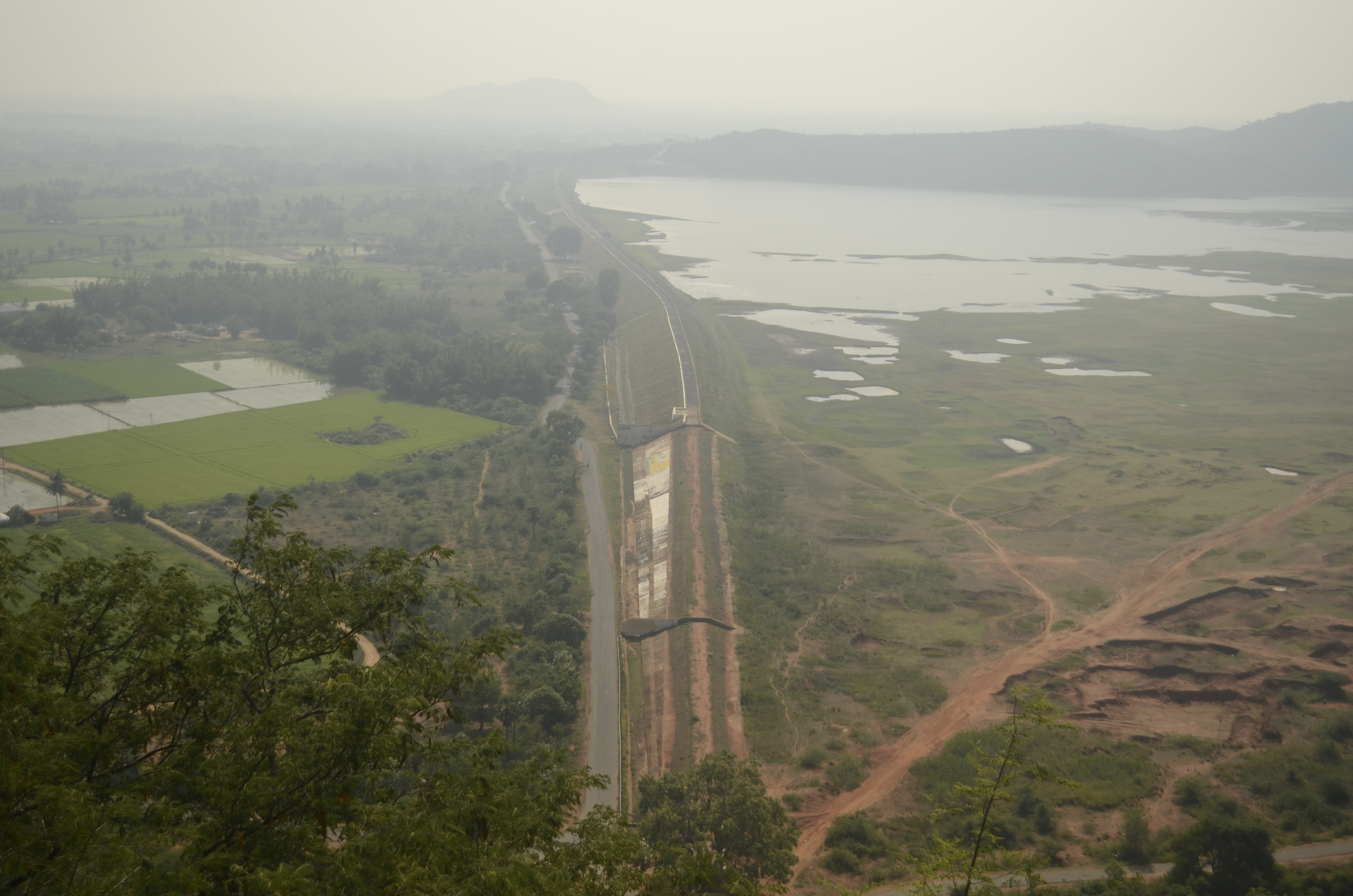
Gomukhi dam

The Gomukhi River foot hill of Kalvarayan Hills which comes from Gomuki Dam from Kallakurichi District Tamil Nadu. It is a tributary of the Vellar

A reservoir was built in the valley of the river in 1965. It is about 16 kilometres (10 mi) north-west of Kallakurichi.
