= Ulundurpettai =

Ulundurpettai, Ulundurpet
- Municipality
- Location in Tamil Nadu, India
- Coordinates: 11°41′26″N 79°17′30″E
- Country: India
- State: Tamil Nadu
- District: Kallakurichi
- Taluka: Ulundurpet taluka

Government
  - MLA: Vasanthavel G R, DMK

Population (2011)
  - Total: 30,734

Languages
  - Official: Tamil
- Time zone: UTC+5:30 (IST)
- PIN: 606107
- Telephone code: 04149
- Vehicle registration: TN-15, TN-32 (until June 2013)

- Ulundurpettai or Ulundurpet (உளுந்தூர்பேட்டை) is a Municipality in Ulundurpet taluka of Kallakurichi district of Tamil Nadu, India. It is at the intersection of NH 68 and NH 45 located 205 km from Chennai and 129 km from Tiruchirappalli. Ulundurpettai itself is a Constituency for Tamil Nadu State Assembly, and is the Taluk headquarters for Ulundurpet taluka in the eastern region of Kallakurichi district, and is in Ulundurpet revenue block.

The Panchayat Town also has a railway station connecting Villupuram Junction, Villupuram and Virudhachalam Junction, Virudhachalam.- Ulundurpet railway station.

== Etymology ==
Ulundurpet was once the home for Palyagar (பாளையகாரர்).The remains of the mud fort are still to be seen. There is a evidence that on July,1750 a Palyagar Ulundhur Raghunatha Nayinar captured Elavasanur fort against French troop. The name Ulundurpettai is derived from the Saivaite temple currently called as Mashapureeswarar (மாஷபுரீஸ்வரர்) temple, located in the area Ulundandar Kovil (உளுந்தண்டார் கோவில்), dedicated to Ulundandar or the Lord of the black-gram.

The story goes that a merchant was once halting there with a consignment of pepper (மிளகு). When a man came up and asked what was in the bags. The merchant lied and said it was black-gram (உளுந்து) to which the stranger replied 'Let it be so'. At the next stage the man found that his goods had actually been changed into black-gram and returning to the spot where he had told the lie he found the stranger still there and realized that he was Lord Siva. The merchant then built a temple for the lord.

== Demographics ==
As of the 2011 India census, the town of Ulundurpettai had a population of 23,734. Males constituted 50% of the population and females 50%. Ulundurpettai had an average literacy rate of 71%, higher than the national average of 59.5%: male literacy was 79%, and female literacy was 63%. As of 2011 in Ulundurpettai, 12% of the population was under 6 years of age.

== Politics ==
Ulundurpettai(77) assembly constituency is part of Villupuram (Lok Sabha constituency). Ulundurpet is one of the state assembly constituencies in Tamil Nadu. Vasanthavel G R is the Member of the Tamil Nadu Legislative Assembly since May 11, 2026.
