= Ulundurpet taluka =

- Town/Taluk
- Location in Tamil Nadu, India
- Coordinates: 11.7°N 79.28°E
- Country: India
- State: Tamil Nadu
- District: Kallakurichi

Government
  - MLA: j.manikannu, DMK

Population (2011)
  - Total: 369,357

Languages
  - Official: Tamil
- Time zone: UTC+5:30 (IST)
- PIN: 606107
- Telephone code: 04149
- Vehicle registration: TN-15

Ulundurpet is a Taluk located in the eastern region of Kallakurichi district in the Indian state of Tamil Nadu. The town of Ulundurpet is the taluk headquarters.

== Demographics ==
According to the 2011 census, the taluk of Ulundurpet had a population of 369,357 with 186,410 males and 182,947 females. There were 981 women for every 1000 men. The taluk had a literacy rate of 60.38. Child population in the age group below 6 was 23,270 Males and 21,734 Females.

== See also ==
- Parrikal
