= Kallakurichi =

Kallakurichi Kallai
- Town
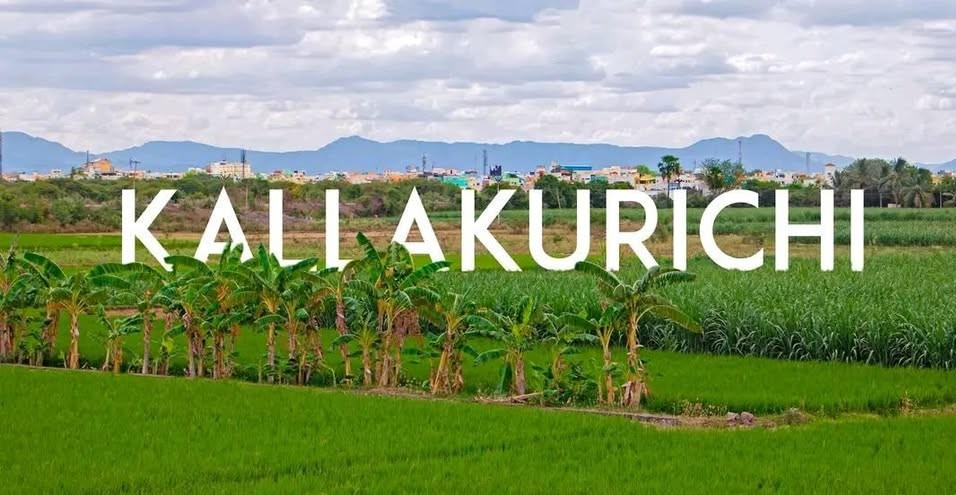
- Kallakurichi

- Kallakurichi, Tamil Nadu, India
- Coordinates: 11.738°N 78.962°E
- Country: India
- State: Tamil Nadu
- District: Kallakuruchi
- Named for: Agriculture Wood Carving

Government
  - Type: First Grade Municipality

Population (2011)
  - Total: 52,507

Languages
  - Official: Tamil
- Time zone: UTC+5:30 (IST)
- PIN: 606 202
- Telephone code: 0-4151
- Vehicle registration: TN-15M
- Website: kallakurichi.nic.in

Kallakurichi is a first-grade municipality and the administrative headquarters of Kallakurichi district in Tamil Nadu, India. The district was formed as the 33rd district of Tamil Nadu by bifurcating Villupuram district on 8 January 2019. It covers 3,530.58 sq km across 2 revenue divisions and 7 taluks, with Kallakurichi located along NH 79. Member of the Legislative Assembly (Tamil Nadu) is M. Senthilkumar, MLA (AIADMK).

== Demographics ==
census
Religion	Percent(%)
Hindu	83.87%
Muslim	13.4%
Christian	1.72%
Sikh	0.04%
Buddhist	0.02%
Jain	0.17%
Other	0.71%
No religion	0.08%

According to 2011 census, Kallakurichi had a population of 52,508 with a sex-ratio of 984 females for every 1,000 males, much above the national average of 929. A total of 5,541 were under the age of six, constituting 2,914 males and 2,627 females. Scheduled Castes and Scheduled Tribes accounted for 15.49% and .27% of the population respectively. The average literacy of the town was 77.08%, compared to the national average of 72.99%. The town had a total of 12801 households. There were a total of 19,013 workers, comprising 471 cultivators, 840 main agricultural labourers, 537 in house hold industries, 14,673 other workers, 2,492 marginal workers, 33 marginal cultivators, 414 marginal agricultural labourers, 102 marginal workers in household industries and 1,943 other marginal workers. As per the religious census of 2011, Kallakurichi had 83.87% Hindus, 13.4% Muslims, 1.72% Christians, 0.04% Sikhs, 0.02% Buddhists, 0.17% Jains, 0.71% following other religions and 0.08% following no religion or did not indicate any religious preference.

== History ==
The formation of Kallakurichi District was announced by the state government in January 2019 by bifurcating Viluppuram district. It became official on 26 November 2019.

The district is an agrarian with paddy, maize, sugarcane, black gram etc., as major crops. The district is mainly rain-fed / tank irrigated along with Gomukhi and Manimuktha river dams.

== Climate ==
The climate is moderate to hot, with the maximum temperature being 39 °C and the minimum at 21 °C. The town gets its rainfall from the northeast monsoon during the winter months and the southwest monsoon during the summer months. The average annual rainfall is 1,070 mm.

== Economy ==
=== Handicraft ===
Kallakurichi was given a GI Tag for “Wood Carvings” and “Alathur lake” on 2020 by Tamil Nadu Handicraft Development Corporation Ltd., “Poompuhar” (A Government of Tamil Nadu Undertaking).
