= Kallakurichi district =

- District of Tamil Nadu
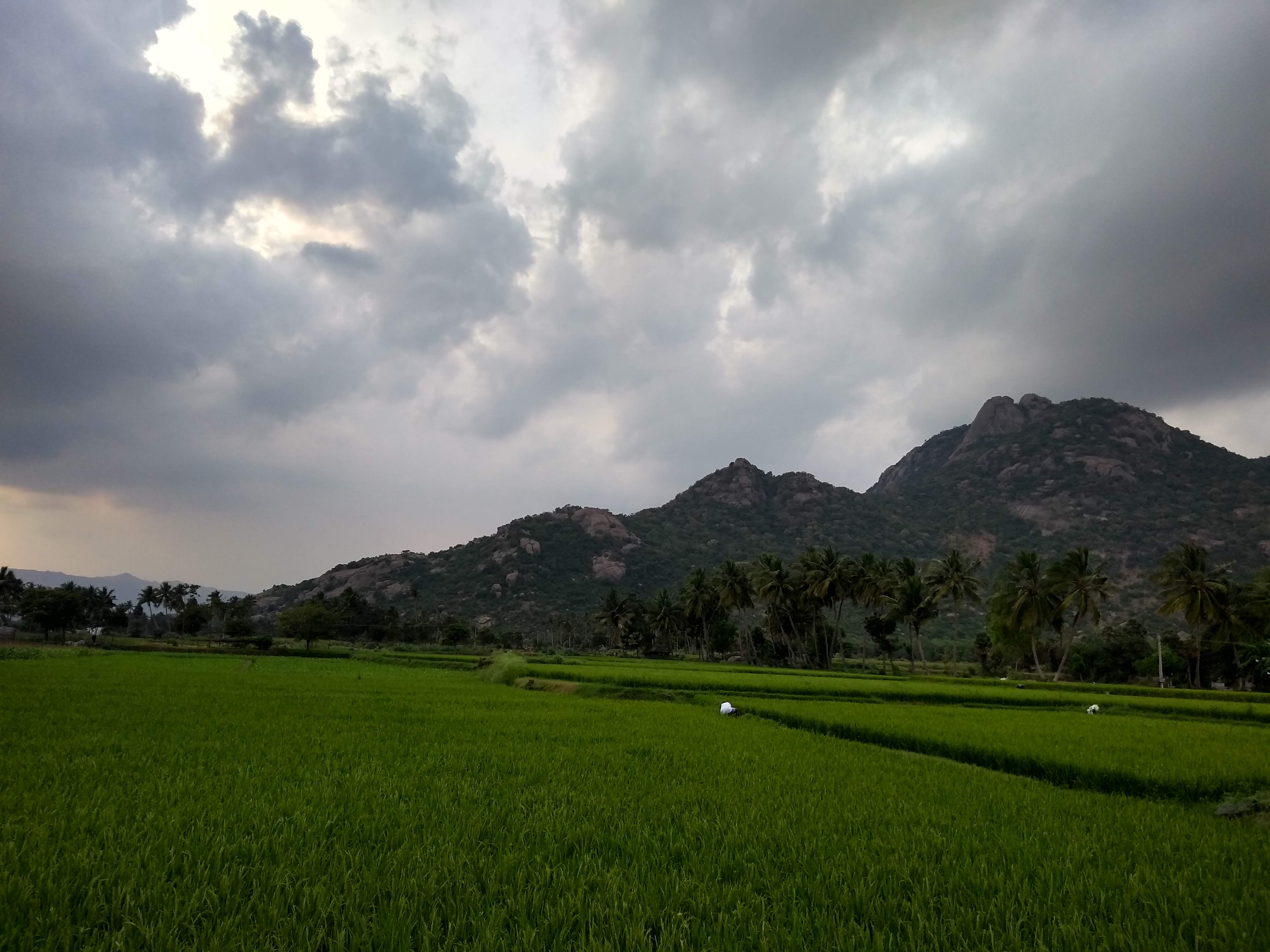
- Kalvarayan Hills from Arasampattu
- Kallakurichi district Location in Tamil Nadu
- Coordinates: 11.738°N 78.962°E
- Country: India
- State: Tamil Nadu
- Municipalities: Kallakurichi, Tirukoilur, Ulundurpet
- Established: 26 November 2019
- Founder: Edappadi K. Palaniswami
- Named for: Sugarcane, cotton, maize, tapioca
- Headquarters: Kallakurichi
- Largest City: Kallakurichi

Government
  - Type: District Administration, Kallakurichi
  - Body: District Administration, Kallakurichi
  - Collector: M S Prasanth, IAS
  - Superintendent of Police: Rajath Chaturvedi

Area Plain area
  - Total: 3,530.58 km^{2} (1,363.16 sq mi)
  - Rank: 1

Population
  - Total: 1,347,204
  - Density: 381.581/km^{2} (988.292/sq mi)

Languages
  - Official: Tamil
- Time zone: UTC+5:30 (IST)
- PIN: 606202
- Telephone code: 04151 04149 04153
- Vehicle registration: TN - 15 TN-32
- Website: kallakurichi.nic.in

Kallakurichi district is one of the 38 districts in the state of Tamil Nadu in India. The district headquarter is Kallakurichi. Kallakurichi District was announced on 8 January 2019 and it came into existence on 26 November 2019.

== History ==
During Ancient times, the region was under the rules of Cholas, Pallavas and various Local Chieftains like Tirukoilur king Malaiyaman. Due to its location between Chola naadu and Thondai naadu, the region was aptly called Nadu naadu (Mid-land). In later times, it passed between the hands of Gingee Nayaks, Arcot Nawabs. During the British Rule, the whole region was a part of the South Arcot District of Madras Presidency.

Prior to 1960, the town of Kallakurichi was considered a village. In 1960, Kallakurichi became a town panchayat, and then was subsequently upgraded to special-grade town panchayat. On 20 October 2004, it was further upgraded to the third-grade municipality. On 7 September 2010, the municipality was upgraded to first-grade municipality. On 8 January 2019, the region surrounding the municipality of Kallakurichi was announced as the 33rd district of Tamil Nadu by bifurcating Villupuram. The area of this municipality is 11.69 km^{2} divided into 21 wards.

== Geography ==
Kallakurichi District is bounded by Thiruvannamalai district in the north, Villupuram district in the east, Dharmapuri and Salem districts in the west, Perambalur and Cuddalore districts in the south. The greater part of the district is covered by the metamorphic rocks belonging to gneiss family. There are also three great groups of sedimentary rocks belonging to different geological periods. The Kalvarayan Hills in the North represents a continuous range of hills covered with some thorny forests and vegetation, which are part of Eastern Ghats. Major rivers in the district include the Thenpennai, Manimuthar, Gomukhi, and Gadilam. Major source of irrigation is through lakes, canals and wells.

Kallakurichi District

=== Kalvarayan Hills ===
The Kalvarayan Hills are a major range of hills situated in the Eastern Ghats. Along with the Pachaimalai, Alavaimalai, Javadi, and Shevaroy hills, they separate the Kaveri River basin to the south from the Palar River basin to the north. The hills range in height from 2000 feet to 3000 feet and extend over an area of 1,095 square kilometres.

== Climate ==
The climate is moderate to hot, with the maximum temperature being 39 °C and the minimum at 21 °C. The District gets its rainfall from the northeast monsoon during the winter months and the southwest monsoon during the summer months. The average annual rainfall is 1,070 mm(107 cm).

== Politics ==
District	No.	Constituency	Name	Party	Alliance	Remarks
Kallakurichi	77	Ulundurpet	G. R. Vasanthavel	DMK	SPA	
Kallakurichi	78	Rishivandiyam	K. Karthikeyan	DMK	SPA	
Kallakurichi	79	Sankarapuram	R. Rakesh	AIADMK	AIADMK+	Supported TVK; Later declared support for EPS
Kallakurichi	80	Kallakurichi (SC)	Arul Vignesh	TVK	TVK+	

== Divisions ==
The district is divided into the 6 taluks of Kallakkurichi, Sankarapuram, Chinnasalem, Ulundurpet, Tirukkovilur and Kalvarayan Hills.

Administrative Divisions

Municipalities

1) Kallakurichi

2) Thirukovilur

3) Ulundurpet

Town Panchayats

1) Sankarapuram

2) Chinnasalem

3) Thiyagadurugam

4) Vadakkanandal

5) Manalurpet

Unions

1) Kallakurichi

2) Sankarapuram

3) Thirukovilur

4) Rishivandiyam

5) Thiyagadurugam

6) Ulundurpet

7) Chinnasalem

8) Thirunavalur

9) Kalvarayanmalai

== Demographics ==
At the time of the 2011 census, Kallakurichi district had a population of 13,47,204. This includes male population of 6,79,900 and a female population of 6,67,304.Kallakurichi district had a sex ratio of 981 females per 1000 males. 197,385 (14.65%) lived in urban areas. Scheduled Castes and Scheduled Tribes made up 30.56% and 3.74% of the population respectively. Most tribals are Malai Vellalar who live in the Kalavarayan Hills.

Religions in Kallakurichi district (2011)
Religion	Percent
Hinduism	91.03%
Christianity	4.45%
Islam	4.24%
Other or not stated	0.28%

Hindus are the majority religion with 91.03% of the population. Christians, who are mostly Dalits and live in rural areas, are 4.45% of the population. Muslims are 4.24% of the population, living predominantly in urban areas.

Languages of Kallakurichi district (2011)
1. Tamil (96.0%)
2. Urdu (2.48%)
3. Telugu (1.38%)
4. Others (0.17%)

Tamil is the predominant language, spoken by 95.97% of the population as their mother tongue. 2.48% of the population speaks Urdu and 1.38% Telugu as their first language.

== Economy ==
Kallakurichi is an emerging agricultural district. It is also known as "Home of Agriculture". There are numerous rice-processing units or modern rice mills, both small and big throughout the district. Textiles, jewellery and agricultural feeds are major businesses. The District has two government co-operative sugar mills and one private sugar mill, and one solvent extraction plant. There are many poultry farms in and around Kallakurichi. The name is derived due to the green nature of this town along the banks of the river Gomuki which nourishes the town by its water.

== Education ==
The District has numerous colleges and schools, both government and private. Notable colleges are Government Kallakurichi Medical College, Government arts college, Polytechnic college in Sankarapuram, A.K.T Engineering College. There was an announcement by the Chief Minister of Tamil Nadu in March 2020 to build a medical college with the initial funding of 370 crores near Pumputhottam, in Siruvangur village, which is 3.5 kilometers from Kallakurichi town and 1st batch of 150 students have started from the academic year 2021/2022.

== Transport ==
The District is connected by roads and railways to major cities and to the rest of the state. The major roads are, National Highway, NH – 79 connecting Salem to Ulundurpet, The District is connected by Railway through Chinnasalem Railway Station on Salem – Vridhachalam Railway Line.

NH-79 Salem-Kallakurichi-Ulundurpet

NH-534 Chinnasalem-Veppur-Vridhachalam

SH-9 Cuddalore-Panruti-Tirukoilur-Tiruvannamalai-Vellore

SH-9A Tiruvannamalai-Thiyagadurugam

SH-6 Kallakurichi-Sankarapuram-Tiruvannamalai

SH-68 Cuddalore-Thirukovilur-Sankarapuram

SH-69 Vridhachalam-Ulundurpet-Villupuram

SH-7 Thirukoilur-Villupuram

SH-204 Kallakurichi-Koothakudi-Trichy

SH-211 Thirukovilur Bypass Road -Kandachipuram

SH-245 Kallakurichi-Kachirayapalayam-Sankarapuram

SH-137 Thirukoilur-Asanur

SH-246 Tirukkovilur- Thiyagadurgam

== See also ==
- List of districts of Tamil Nadu
- Vilandai
