= List of developmental administrative units of Tamil Nadu =

Developmental administration of Tamil Nadu is carried out by Panchayat Unions or blocks in rural areas of Tamil Nadu, a southern state of India. These panchayat unions have a set of panchayat villages under them. In urban areas, the governance is done by municipal corporations, municipalities or town panchayats based on the size of the town.

The revenue administration, in contrast is carried out by the Revenue divisions and Taluks. These administrative units are classified based on the district. There are 38 districts in Tamil Nadu and for revenue administration purposes, each district is divided into divisions, which are further divided to Taluks. Each of these Taluks have a list of revenue villages under them. Tahsildar is the head of these Taluks.

== Developmental administration ==
The below list provides the list of blocks in each district

District	Urban			Rural			
District	Corporations	Municipalities	Town Panchayats	Number of Blocks	Number of Panchayat Villages	Blocks	Panchayat Villages
Ariyalur	0	2	2	6	201	Andimadam	30
Ariyalur	0	2	2	6	201	Ariyalur	37
Ariyalur	0	2	2	6	201	Jayankondan	35
Ariyalur	0	2	2	6	201	Sendurai	30
Ariyalur	0	2	2	6	201	T.Palur	33
Ariyalur	0	2	2	6	201	Thirumanur	36
Chengalpattu	1	4	12	8	359	Acharapakkam	59
Chengalpattu	1	4	12	8	359	Chithamur	43
Chengalpattu	1	4	12	8	359	Kattankolathur	39
Chengalpattu	1	4	12	8	359	Lathur	41
Chengalpattu	1	4	12	8	359	Madurantakam	58
Chengalpattu	1	4	12	8	359	Parangimalai	15
Chengalpattu	1	4	12	8	359	Thiruporur	50
Chengalpattu	1	4	12	8	359	Tirukalukundram	54
Chennai	1	1	0	0	0	-	0
Coimbatore	1	5	37	12	229	Anaimalai	19
Coimbatore	1	5	37	12	229	Annur	21
Coimbatore	1	5	37	12	229	Karamadai	17
Coimbatore	1	5	37	12	229	Kinathukadavu	34
Coimbatore	1	5	37	12	229	Madukkarai	9
Coimbatore	1	5	37	12	229	Periyanayakkanpalayam	9
Coimbatore	1	5	37	12	229	Pollachi (North)	39
Coimbatore	1	5	37	12	229	Pollachi (South)	26
Coimbatore	1	5	37	12	229	Sarcarsamakulam	8
Coimbatore	1	5	37	12	229	Sultanpet	20
Coimbatore	1	5	37	12	229	Sulur	17
Coimbatore	1	5	37	12	229	Thondamuthur	10
Cuddalore	1	6	14	13	683	Annagramam	42
Cuddalore	1	6	14	13	683	MelBhuvanagiri	47
Cuddalore	1	6	14	13	683	Cuddalore	51
Cuddalore	1	6	14	13	683	Kammapuram	43
Cuddalore	1	6	14	13	683	Kattumannar Koil	42
Cuddalore	1	6	14	13	683	Keerapalayam	46
Cuddalore	1	6	14	13	683	Kumaratchi	57
Cuddalore	1	6	14	13	683	Kurinjipadi	51
Cuddalore	1	6	14	13	683	Mangalur	66
Cuddalore	1	6	14	13	683	Nallur	64
Cuddalore	1	6	14	13	683	Panruti	41
Cuddalore	1	6	14	13	683	Parangipettai	41
Cuddalore	1	6	14	13	683	Srimushnam	41
Cuddalore	1	6	14	13	683	Vridhachalam	51
Dharmapuri	0	2	10	10	251	Dharmapuri	28
Dharmapuri	0	2	10	10	251	Eriyur	10
Dharmapuri	0	2	10	10	251	Harur	34
Dharmapuri	0	2	10	10	251	Karimangalam	30
Dharmapuri	0	2	10	10	251	Kadathur	25
Dharmapuri	0	2	10	10	251	Morappur	18
Dharmapuri	0	2	10	10	251	Nallampalli	32
Dharmapuri	0	2	10	10	251	Palacode	32
Dharmapuri	0	2	10	10	251	Pappireddipatti	19
Dharmapuri	0	2	10	10	251	Pennagaram	23
Dindigul	1	3	23	14	306	Athoor	22
Dindigul	1	3	23	14	306	Batlagundu	17
Dindigul	1	3	23	14	306	Dindigul	14
Dindigul	1	3	23	14	306	Guziliamparai	17
Dindigul	1	3	23	14	306	Kodaikanal	15
Dindigul	1	3	23	14	306	Natham	23
Dindigul	1	3	23	14	306	Nilakottai	23
Dindigul	1	3	23	14	306	Oddanchatram	35
Dindigul	1	3	23	14	306	Palani	20
Dindigul	1	3	23	14	306	Reddiarchatiram	24
Dindigul	1	3	23	14	306	Shanarpatti	21
Dindigul	1	3	23	14	306	Thoppampatty	38
Dindigul	1	3	23	14	306	Vadamadurai	15
Dindigul	1	3	23	14	306	Vedasandur	22
Erode	1	4	42	14	225	Ammapet	20
Erode	1	4	42	14	225	Anthiyur	14
Erode	1	4	42	14	225	Bhavani	15
Erode	1	4	42	14	225	Bhavanisagar	15
Erode	1	4	42	14	225	Chennimalai	22
Erode	1	4	42	14	225	Erode	6
Erode	1	4	42	14	225	Gobichettipalayam	21
Erode	1	4	42	14	225	Kodumudi	10
Erode	1	4	42	14	225	Modakkurichi	23
Erode	1	4	42	14	225	Nambiyur	15
Erode	1	4	42	14	225	Perundurai	29
Erode	1	4	42	14	225	Sathyamangalam	15
Erode	1	4	42	14	225	Talavadi	10
Erode	1	4	42	14	225	Thookanaickanpalayam	10
Kancheepuram	1	2	5	5	279	Kancheepuram	43
Kancheepuram	1	2	5	5	279	Kundrathur	44
Kancheepuram	1	2	5	5	279	Sriperumbudur	58
Kancheepuram	1	2	5	5	279	Uthiramerur	73
Kancheepuram	1	2	5	5	279	Walajabad	61
Kanniyakumari	1	4	55	9	95	Agastheeswaram	12
Kanniyakumari	1	4	55	9	95	Killiyoor	8
Kanniyakumari	1	4	55	9	95	Kurunthancode	9
Kanniyakumari	1	4	55	9	95	Melpuram	10
Kanniyakumari	1	4	55	9	95	Munchirai	11
Kanniyakumari	1	4	55	9	95	Rajakkamangalam	12
Kanniyakumari	1	4	55	9	95	Thuckalay	7
Kanniyakumari	1	4	55	9	95	Thiruvattar	10
Kanniyakumari	1	4	55	9	95	Thovalai	16
Karur	1	3	11	8	157	Aravakurichi	20
Karur	1	3	11	8	157	K.Paramathi	30
Karur	1	3	11	8	157	Kadavur	20
Karur	1	3	11	8	157	Karur	14
Karur	1	3	11	8	157	Krishnarayapuram	23
Karur	1	3	11	8	157	Kulithalai	13
Karur	1	3	11	8	157	Thanthoni	17
Karur	1	3	11	8	157	Thogamalai	20
Krishnagiri	1	1	6	10	333	Bargur	36
Krishnagiri	1	1	6	10	333	Hosur	26
Krishnagiri	1	1	6	10	333	Kaveripattanam	36
Krishnagiri	1	1	6	10	333	Kelamangalam	28
Krishnagiri	1	1	6	10	333	Krishnagiri	30
Krishnagiri	1	1	6	10	333	Mathur	24
Krishnagiri	1	1	6	10	333	Shoolagiri	42
Krishnagiri	1	1	6	10	333	Thally	50
Krishnagiri	1	1	6	10	333	Uthangarai	34
Krishnagiri	1	1	6	10	333	Veppanapalli	27
Madurai	1	4	9	13	420	Alanganallur	37
Madurai	1	4	9	13	420	Chellampatti	29
Madurai	1	4	9	13	420	Kallikudi	36
Madurai	1	4	9	13	420	Kottampatti	27
Madurai	1	4	9	13	420	Madurai East	36
Madurai	1	4	9	13	420	Madurai West	29
Madurai	1	4	9	13	420	Melur	36
Madurai	1	4	9	13	420	Sedapatti	31
Madurai	1	4	9	13	420	T.Kallupatti	42
Madurai	1	4	9	13	420	Thirumangalam	38
Madurai	1	4	9	13	420	Thirupparankundram	38
Madurai	1	4	9	13	420	Usilampatti	18
Madurai	1	4	9	13	420	Vadipatti	23
Mayiladuthurai	0	2	3	5	241	Kollidam	42
Mayiladuthurai	0	2	3	5	241	Kuthalam	51
Mayiladuthurai	0	2	3	5	241	Mayiladuthurai	54
Mayiladuthurai	0	2	3	5	241	Sembanarkoil	57
Mayiladuthurai	0	2	3	5	241	Sirkali	37
Nagapattinam	0	2	4	6	193	Keelaiyur	27
Nagapattinam	0	2	4	6	193	Kilvelur	38
Nagapattinam	0	2	4	6	193	Nagapattinam	29
Nagapattinam	0	2	4	6	193	Thalainayar	24
Nagapattinam	0	2	4	6	193	Thirumarugal	39
Nagapattinam	0	2	4	6	193	Vedaranyam	36
Namakkal	1	5	19	15	322	Elachipalayam	29
Namakkal	1	5	19	15	322	Erumaipatty	24
Namakkal	1	5	19	15	322	Kabilarmalai	20
Namakkal	1	5	19	15	322	Kollihills	14
Namakkal	1	5	19	15	322	Mallasamudram	27
Namakkal	1	5	19	15	322	Mohanur	25
Namakkal	1	5	19	15	322	Namagiripet	18
Namakkal	1	5	19	15	322	Namakkal	25
Namakkal	1	5	19	15	322	Pallipalayam	15
Namakkal	1	5	19	15	322	Paramathy	20
Namakkal	1	5	19	15	322	Puduchatram	21
Namakkal	1	5	19	15	322	Rasipuram	20
Namakkal	1	5	19	15	322	Sendamangalam	14
Namakkal	1	5	19	15	322	Tiruchengode	26
Namakkal	1	5	19	15	322	Vennandur	24
The Nilgiris	0	5	11	4	35	Coonoor	6
The Nilgiris	0	5	11	4	35	Gudalur	5
The Nilgiris	0	5	11	4	35	Kotagiri	11
The Nilgiris	0	5	11	4	35	Udhagai	13
Perambalur	0	1	4	4	121	Alathur	39
Perambalur	0	1	4	4	121	Perambalur	20
Perambalur	0	1	4	4	121	Veppanthattai	29
Perambalur	0	1	4	4	121	Veppur	33
Pudukkottai	0	2	8	13	497	Annavasal	43
Pudukkottai	0	2	8	13	497	Arantangi	52
Pudukkottai	0	2	8	13	497	Arimalam	32
Pudukkottai	0	2	8	13	497	Avudaiyarkoil	35
Pudukkottai	0	2	8	13	497	Gandaravakottai	36
Pudukkottai	0	2	8	13	497	Karambakkudi	39
Pudukkottai	0	2	8	13	497	Kunnandarkoil	37
Pudukkottai	0	2	8	13	497	Manamelkudi	28
Pudukkottai	0	2	8	13	497	Ponnamaravathi	42
Pudukkottai	0	2	8	13	497	Pudukkottai	27
Pudukkottai	0	2	8	13	497	Thiruvarankulam	48
Pudukkottai	0	2	8	13	497	Thirumayam	33
Pudukkottai	0	2	8	13	497	Viralimalai	45
Ramanathapuram	0	4	7	11	429	Bogalur	26
Ramanathapuram	0	4	7	11	429	Kadaladi	60
Ramanathapuram	0	4	7	11	429	Kamudi	53
Ramanathapuram	0	4	7	11	429	Mandapam	28
Ramanathapuram	0	4	7	11	429	Mudukulathur	46
Ramanathapuram	0	4	7	11	429	Nainarkoil	37
Ramanathapuram	0	4	7	11	429	Paramakudi	39
Ramanathapuram	0	4	7	11	429	Rajasingamangalam	35
Ramanathapuram	0	4	7	11	429	Ramanathapuram	25
Ramanathapuram	0	4	7	11	429	Tiruppullani	33
Ramanathapuram	0	4	7	11	429	Tiruvadanai	47
Salem	1	6	33	20	385	Attur	20
Salem	1	6	33	20	385	Ayothiyapattinam	32
Salem	1	6	33	20	385	Gangavalli	14
Salem	1	6	33	20	385	Idappady	10
Salem	1	6	33	20	385	Kadayaampatti	17
Salem	1	6	33	20	385	Kolathur	14
Salem	1	6	33	20	385	Konganapuram	9
Salem	1	6	33	20	385	Magudanchavadi	12
Salem	1	6	33	20	385	Mecheri	17
Salem	1	6	33	20	385	Nangavalli	9
Salem	1	6	33	20	385	Omalur	33
Salem	1	6	33	20	385	Panaimarathupatti	20
Salem	1	6	33	20	385	Peddanaickenpalayam	36
Salem	1	6	33	20	385	Salem	14
Salem	1	6	33	20	385	Sankari	22
Salem	1	6	33	20	385	Thalaivasal	35
Salem	1	6	33	20	385	Tharamangalam	17
Salem	1	6	33	20	385	Valapady	20
Salem	1	6	33	20	385	Veerapandy	25
Salem	1	6	33	20	385	Yercaud	9
Sivagangai	1	4	12	12	445	Devakottai	42
Sivagangai	1	4	12	12	445	Ilaiyankudi	55
Sivagangai	1	4	12	12	445	Kalayarkoil	43
Sivagangai	1	4	12	12	445	Kallal	44
Sivagangai	1	4	12	12	445	Kannangudi	17
Sivagangai	1	4	12	12	445	Manamadurai	39
Sivagangai	1	4	12	12	445	S.Pudur	21
Sivagangai	1	4	12	12	445	Sakkottai	26
Sivagangai	1	4	12	12	445	Singampunari	30
Sivagangai	1	4	12	12	445	Sivagangai	43
Sivagangai	1	4	12	12	445	Thiruppathur	40
Sivagangai	1	4	12	12	445	Thiruppuvanam	45
Thanjavur	2	2	22	14	589	Ammapet	46
Thanjavur	2	2	22	14	589	Budalur	42
Thanjavur	2	2	22	14	589	Kumbakonam	47
Thanjavur	2	2	22	14	589	Madukkur	33
Thanjavur	2	2	22	14	589	Orathanadu	58
Thanjavur	2	2	22	14	589	Papanasam	34
Thanjavur	2	2	22	14	589	Pattukkottai	43
Thanjavur	2	2	22	14	589	Peravurani	26
Thanjavur	2	2	22	14	589	Sethubavachatram	37
Thanjavur	2	2	22	14	589	Thanjavur	61
Thanjavur	2	2	22	14	589	Thiruppanandal	44
Thanjavur	2	2	22	14	589	Thiruvaiyaru	40
Thanjavur	2	2	22	14	589	Thiruvidaimarudur	48
Thanjavur	2	2	22	14	589	Thiruvonam	30
Theni	0	6	22	8	130	Andipatti	30
Theni	0	6	22	8	130	Bodinaickanur	15
Theni	0	6	22	8	130	Chinnamanur	14
Theni	0	6	22	8	130	Kadamalaikundru Myladumparai	18
Theni	0	6	22	8	130	Cumbum	5
Theni	0	6	22	8	130	Periyakulam	17
Theni	0	6	22	8	130	Theni	18
Theni	0	6	22	8	130	Uthamapalayam	13
Thiruvallur	1	6	10	14	526	Ellapuram	53
Thiruvallur	1	6	10	14	526	Gummidipoondi	61
Thiruvallur	1	6	10	14	526	Kadambathur	43
Thiruvallur	1	6	10	14	526	Minjur	55
Thiruvallur	1	6	10	14	526	Pallipet	33
Thiruvallur	1	6	10	14	526	Poonamallee	28
Thiruvallur	1	6	10	14	526	Poondi	49
Thiruvallur	1	6	10	14	526	Puzhal	7
Thiruvallur	1	6	10	14	526	Rama Krishna Raju Pettai	38
Thiruvallur	1	6	10	14	526	Sholavaram	39
Thiruvallur	1	6	10	14	526	Tiruvallur	38
Thiruvallur	1	6	10	14	526	Tiruttani	27
Thiruvallur	1	6	10	14	526	Thiruvalangadu	42
Thiruvallur	1	6	10	14	526	Villivakkam	13
Thiruvannamalai	1	3	10	18	860	Anakkavoor	55
Thiruvannamalai	1	3	10	18	860	Arni	38
Thiruvannamalai	1	3	10	18	860	Chengam	44
Thiruvannamalai	1	3	10	18	860	Chetpet	49
Thiruvannamalai	1	3	10	18	860	Cheyyar	53
Thiruvannamalai	1	3	10	18	860	Jawadhu Hills	11
Thiruvannamalai	1	3	10	18	860	Kalasapakkam	45
Thiruvannamalai	1	3	10	18	860	Kilpennathur	45
Thiruvannamalai	1	3	10	18	860	Pernamallur	57
Thiruvannamalai	1	3	10	18	860	Polur	40
Thiruvannamalai	1	3	10	18	860	Pudupalayam	37
Thiruvannamalai	1	3	10	18	860	Thandrampet	47
Thiruvannamalai	1	3	10	18	860	Thellar	61
Thiruvannamalai	1	3	10	18	860	Thurinjapuram	47
Thiruvannamalai	1	3	10	18	860	Tiruvannamalai	69
Thiruvannamalai	1	3	10	18	860	Vandavasi	61
Thiruvannamalai	1	3	10	18	860	Vembakkam	64
Thiruvannamalai	1	3	10	18	860	Arni West	37
Thiruvarur	0	4	7	10	430	Kudavaasal	49
Thiruvarur	0	4	7	10	430	Koradacheri	44
Thiruvarur	0	4	7	10	430	Kottur	49
Thiruvarur	0	4	7	10	430	Mannargudi	51
Thiruvarur	0	4	7	10	430	Muthupettai	29
Thiruvarur	0	4	7	10	430	Nannilam	48
Thiruvarur	0	4	7	10	430	Needamangalam	44
Thiruvarur	0	4	7	10	430	Thiruthuraipoondi	32
Thiruvarur	0	4	7	10	430	Thiruvarur	34
Thiruvarur	0	4	7	10	430	Valangaiman	50
Thoothukudi	1	4	19	12	403	Alwarthirunagiri	30
Thoothukudi	1	4	19	12	403	Karungulam	31
Thoothukudi	1	4	19	12	403	Kayathar	45
Thoothukudi	1	4	19	12	403	Kovilpatti	38
Thoothukudi	1	4	19	12	403	Ottapidaram	61
Thoothukudi	1	4	19	12	403	Pudur	44
Thoothukudi	1	4	19	12	403	Sattankulam	24
Thoothukudi	1	4	19	12	403	Srivaikuntam	31
Thoothukudi	1	4	19	12	403	Tiruchendur	11
Thoothukudi	1	4	19	12	403	Tuticorin	20
Thoothukudi	1	4	19	12	403	Udangudi	17
Thoothukudi	1	4	19	12	403	Vilathikulam	51
Tiruchirappalli	1	2	16	14	404	Andhanallur	25
Tiruchirappalli	1	2	16	14	404	Lalgudi	45
Tiruchirappalli	1	2	16	14	404	Manachanallur	35
Tiruchirappalli	1	2	16	14	404	Manapparai	21
Tiruchirappalli	1	2	16	14	404	Manikandam	22
Tiruchirappalli	1	2	16	14	404	Marungapuri	49
Tiruchirappalli	1	2	16	14	404	Musiri	33
Tiruchirappalli	1	2	16	14	404	Pullampady	33
Tiruchirappalli	1	2	16	14	404	Thantthaiyangarpet	25
Tiruchirappalli	1	2	16	14	404	Thiruverumbur	20
Tiruchirappalli	1	2	16	14	404	Thottiam	26
Tiruchirappalli	1	2	16	14	404	Thuraiyur	34
Tiruchirappalli	1	2	16	14	404	Uppiliyapuram	18
Tiruchirappalli	1	2	16	14	404	Vaiyampatty	18
Tenkasi	0	6	18	10	221	Alankulam	32
Tenkasi	0	6	18	10	221	Kadayam	23
Tenkasi	0	6	18	10	221	Kadayanallur	16
Tenkasi	0	6	18	10	221	Keelapavoor	21
Tenkasi	0	6	18	10	221	Kuruvikulam	39
Tenkasi	0	6	18	10	221	Melaneelithanallur	20
Tenkasi	0	6	18	10	221	Sankarankoil	28
Tenkasi	0	6	18	10	221	Shencottai	6
Tenkasi	0	6	18	10	221	Tenkasi	14
Tenkasi	0	6	18	10	221	Vasudevanallur	22
Tirunelveli	1	2	18	9	204	Ambasamudram	13
Tirunelveli	1	2	18	9	204	Cheranmahadevi	12
Tirunelveli	1	2	18	9	204	Kalakadu	17
Tirunelveli	1	2	18	9	204	Manur	43
Tirunelveli	1	2	18	9	204	Nanguneri	27
Tirunelveli	1	2	18	9	204	Palayamkottai	30
Tirunelveli	1	2	18	9	204	Pappakudi	17
Tirunelveli	1	2	18	9	204	Radhapuram	27
Tirunelveli	1	2	18	9	204	Valliyoor	18
Tiruppur	1	6	16	13	265	Avanashi	31
Tiruppur	1	6	16	13	265	Dharapuram	16
Tiruppur	1	6	16	13	265	Gudimangalam	23
Tiruppur	1	6	16	13	265	Kangayam	15
Tiruppur	1	6	16	13	265	Kundadam	24
Tiruppur	1	6	16	13	265	Madathukulam	11
Tiruppur	1	6	16	13	265	Mulanur	12
Tiruppur	1	6	16	13	265	Palladam	20
Tiruppur	1	6	16	13	265	Pongalur	16
Tiruppur	1	6	16	13	265	Tiruppur	13
Tiruppur	1	6	16	13	265	Udumalpet	38
Tiruppur	1	6	16	13	265	Uthukuli	37
Tiruppur	1	6	16	13	265	Vellakoil	9
Ranipet	0	6	9	7	308	Arakonam	26
Ranipet	0	6	9	7	308	Arcot	39
Ranipet	0	6	9	7	308	Kaveripakkam	55
Ranipet	0	6	9	7	308	Nemili	52
Ranipet	0	6	9	7	308	Sholinghur	45
Ranipet	0	6	9	7	308	Thimiri	55
Ranipet	0	6	9	7	308	Walajah	36
Tirupathur	0	4	3	6	201	Alangayam	29
Tirupathur	0	4	3	6	201	Jolarpet	36
Tirupathur	0	4	3	6	201	Kandhili	39
Tirupathur	0	4	3	6	201	Madhanur	36
Tirupathur	0	4	3	6	201	Natrampalli	26
Tirupathur	0	4	3	6	201	Tirupathur	35
Vellore	1	2	4	7	235	Anaicut	38
Vellore	1	2	4	7	235	Gudiyatham	44
Vellore	1	2	4	7	235	Kilvaithinankuppam	39
Vellore	1	2	4	7	235	Kaniyambadi	24
Vellore	1	2	4	7	235	Katpadi	21
Vellore	1	2	4	7	235	Peranambet	51
Vellore	1	2	4	7	235	Vellore	18
Kallakurichi	0	3	7	9	412	Chinnasalem	50
Kallakurichi	0	3	7	9	412	Kallakkurichi	46
Kallakurichi	0	3	7	9	412	Kalrayan Hills	15
Kallakurichi	0	3	7	9	412	Rishivandiyam	53
Kallakurichi	0	3	7	9	412	Sankarapuram	44
Kallakurichi	0	3	7	9	412	Thiyagadurgam	40
Kallakurichi	0	3	7	9	412	Tirukoilur	52
Kallakurichi	0	3	7	9	412	Tirunavalur	44
Kallakurichi	0	3	7	9	412	Ulundurpet	53
Villupuram	0	3	8	13	688	Gingee	60
Villupuram	0	3	8	13	688	Kanai	50
Villupuram	0	3	8	13	688	Kandamangalam	46
Villupuram	0	3	8	13	688	Koliyanur	42
Villupuram	0	3	8	13	688	Mailam	47
Villupuram	0	3	8	13	688	Merkanam	56
Villupuram	0	3	8	13	688	Melmalayanur	55
Villupuram	0	3	8	13	688	Mugaiyur	48
Villupuram	0	3	8	13	688	Olakkur	52
Villupuram	0	3	8	13	688	Thiruvennainallur	50
Villupuram	0	3	8	13	688	Vallam	66
Villupuram	0	3	8	13	688	Vanur	65
Villupuram	0	3	8	13	688	Vikkiravandi	51
Virudhunagar	1	6	9	11	450	Aruppukkottai	32
Virudhunagar	1	6	9	11	450	Kariapatti	36
Virudhunagar	1	6	9	11	450	Narikudi	44
Virudhunagar	1	6	9	11	450	Rajapalayam	36
Virudhunagar	1	6	9	11	450	Sattur	46
Virudhunagar	1	6	9	11	450	Sivakasi	54
Virudhunagar	1	6	9	11	450	Srivilliputhur	29
Virudhunagar	1	6	9	11	450	Tiruchuli	40
Virudhunagar	1	6	9	11	450	Vembakottai	48
Virudhunagar	1	6	9	11	450	Virudhunagar	58
Virudhunagar	1	6	9	11	450	Vathirayiruppu	27

== See also ==
- Districts of Tamil Nadu
- Government of Tamil Nadu
- List of revenue divisions of Tamil Nadu
