= Reddiyur =

Reddiyur may refer to:

- Reddiyur, Cuddalore district
- Reddiyur, Dharmapuri block, Dharmapuri district
- Reddiyur, Palacode block, Dharmapuri district
- Reddiyur, Tirupathur district
- Reddiyur, Thiruvallur district
- Reddiyur, Idappadi block, Salem district
- Reddiyur, Kolathur block, Salem district
- Reddiyur, Magudanchavadi block, Salem district
- Reddiyur, Omalur block, Salem district
- Reddiyur, Anaicut block, Vellore district
- Reddiyur, Alangayan block, Vellore district
