= List of educational institutions in Namakkal district =

This is a list of the schools and colleges in Namakkal district.

== Engineering colleges ==
- J.K.K.Nattraja College of Engineering and Technology, Komarapalayam
- Vetri Vinayaha College of Engineering and Technology, Namakkal
- Paavai Engineering College, Namakkal
- Paavai College of Engineering, Namakkal
- Pavai College of Technology, Namakkal
- K. S. Rangasamy College of Technology, Tiruchengode
- Muthayammal Engineering college, Rasipuram
- King College of Technology, Nallur, Namakkal
- Mahendra Engineering College, Mallasamudram, Thiruchengode-Salem main road
- KSR Institute for Engineering and Technology, Tiruchengode, Namakkal, India - 637215

== Pharmacy colleges ==
- J.K.K. Nattraja College of Pharmacy, Komarapalayam

== Dental colleges ==
- K.S.R. Institute of Dental Science and Research, Tiruchengode
- J.K.K.Nattraja Dental College and Hospital, Komarapalayam

== Nursing colleges ==
- J.K.K.Nattraja College of Nursing and Research, Komarapalayam

== Polytechnic colleges ==
- Muthaymmal Polytechnic College, Rasipuram
- Sri Vengateswaraa Polytechnic College, Vennandur
- Voice of God Polytechnic College, Varagur

== Arts and science colleges ==
- Muthaymmal Memorial College of Arts & Science, Rasipuram
- Namakkal Kavignar Ramaligam Government Arts College for Women, Namakkal
- Thiruvalluvar Government Arts College, Rasipuram
- J.K.K. Nattraja College of Arts & Science, Komarapalayam
- K. S. R. College of Arts and Science, Tiruchengode
- A.A. Govt. Arts College for Men, Namakkal
- Vivekanandha college of arts and sciences for women[autonomous]

== B.Ed colleges ==
- Government College of Education, Komarapalayam
- J.K.K.Nattraja College of Education, Komarapalayam

== Management colleges ==
- K. S. Rangasamy College of Technology, Tiruchengode

== Schools ==
=== Matriculation schools ===
- J.K.K.Nattraja Matriculation Higher Secondary School, Komarapalayam

=== Elementary schools ===
- J.K.K.Nattraja Vidhyalya, Komarapalayam
