= Keerapalayam block =

Keerapalayam block is a revenue block of Cuddalore district of the Indian state of Tamil Nadu. This revenue block consist of 63 panchayat villages.

== List of Panchayat Villages ==
They are,

SI.No	Panchayat Village
1	Ayeepettai
2	C.Melavanniyur
3	Edaiyanpalcherry
4	K.Adoor
5	Kandakumaram
6	Keelnatham
7	Koolapadi
8	Madhuranthaganallur
9	Mugaiyur
10	Odakkanallur
11	Palayankottai Mel
12	Paradur
13	Poorthangudi
14	Ramapuram
15	Sengalmedu
16	Sozhatharam
17	Tharasur
18	Thunisiramedu
19	Vadakkupalayam
20	Vattathur
21	Veiyaloor
22	Ayyanur-akkaramangalam
23	C.Veerasozhagan
24	Ennanagaram
25	Kaanur
26	Kannangudi
27	Keerapalayam
28	Kothandavilagam
29	Mazhavarayanallur
30	Nandeeswaramangalam
31	Orathur
32	Palayanserthangudi
33	Perungaloor
34	Pudaiyur
35	Sakkankudi
36	Sethiyur
37	T.Manalur
38	Thenharirajapuram
39	Vaakkur
40	Vadapakkam
41	Vayalur
42	Velliyangudi
43	Boothangudi
44	Devangudi
45	Gudalaiyathur
46	Kaliyamalai
47	Kavalakudi
48	Kiliyanur
49	Kumarakudi
50	Mudikandanallur
51	Nangudi
52	Palayankottai Keel
53	Pannapattu
54	Perur
55	Punthottam
56	Sathamangalam
57	Sirukalur
58	T.Neduncherry
59	Therkkuvridangan
60	Vadaharirajapuram
61	Valasakkadu
62	Vazhakollai
63	Vilagam
64	Kuringikudi
