= Manamadurai Bus Terminal =

Bus Terminus in Manamadurai

Manamadurai bus terminal Manamadurai bus stand

General information
- Location: Madurai – Rameshwaram highway
- Coordinates: 9.9439°N 78.1561°E
- System: Integrated Bus Stand
- Owner: Manamadurai Municipality
- Platforms: 25 bays

Construction
- Structure type: Elevated
- Depth: 50 cm (20 in)
- Parking: Yes
- Cycle facilities: Yes

Other information
- Station code: MNM
- Fare zone: TNSTC - KUMBAKONAM DIVISION TNSTC - MADURAI DIVISION TNSTC - KARAIKUDI DIVISION

History
- Opened: 2000; 26 years ago
- Closed: No
- Rebuilt: Manamadurai New bus terminal
- Former names: Manamadurai bus stand

Services
TNSETC sleeper and Semi-sleeper AC and Non-AC buses TN state Intercity Route buses Town buses, Urban and semi Urban Town buses, private and omni sleeper buses
Location

Manamadurai Bus Stand is located in NH49 RAMESHWARAM - COCHIN INTERSTATE CORRIDOR HIGHWAY. It is well equipped with toilets, Food and juice stalls, Auto stand and it's only 500 metres away from the Manamadurai Junction.

Since it is located in the holy pilgrimage route to Rameshwaram., This bus station is always seems to be crowded.

== Traffic ==
TNSTC operates inter-city route buses regularly from Madurai M.G.R Mattuthavani Bus Terminus to Rameswaram via Manamadurai. Every ten minutes, a bus is available in both the directions. It's very convenient for tourists visiting Rameswaram as well as the local people from Paramakudi, Ramanathapuram, Manamadurai and Thiruppuvanam. And many more inter-city buses are operated to Sivagangai, Tirupattur, Karaikudi, Pudukottai, Tiruchirapalli, Kamudhi, Mudhukulathur, Sayalgudi, Ervadi Dargah, Veeracholan, Narikkudi, Thiruchuli, Dindigul, Theni, Virudhunagar, Aruppukottai, Salem, Coimbatore, Pallapatti, Karur, Erode, Namakkal and Palani. Manamadurai bus terminus also handles town buses from Sivagangai, Paramakudi, Thirupuvanam, Ilayankudi, Thayamangalam.

The SETC A/c and Non-a/c semi-sleeper and Sleeper buses are operated to Chennai, Tiruchirapalli and Bangalore. Private Omni buses too offer Services from Manamadurai to Chennai.

== History ==
Before 2000, The Manamadurai bus stand was located in the heart of the town in the western banks. All the buses should come through the busy and congested streets of Manamadurai through Anna Statue and Mandapam main road which is too narrow and simultaneously two bus cannot pass at a time. And the road seemed always jammed. Hence, during 1998, The Manamadurai Union Panchayat along with Tamilnadu Road Transport corporation decided to build an integrated new bus terminus on the bypass with high infrastructure. It took two years to build the bus stand with integrated shopping complex, two wheeler parking lot, toilets, hotels, juice stalls and attached with a petrol station. Finally, on 2000, the new bus terminus was opened and the old bus terminus was auctioned for marketing complex. Still, the Manamadurai folks differentiate them by saying "பழைய பஸ் ஸ்டாண்டு" (old bus stand), "புது பஸ் ஸ்டாண்டு" (new bus stand).

== Reception ==
There have been a few critiques related to the station. There have been complaints about a lack of availability of potable drinking water, few amenities, and insufficient bathroom facilities. The lack of drinking water is an issue directly outside the station as well, affecting a nearby vegetable market.

The nearest TNSTC bus depot to Manamadurai bus stand is Manamadurai SIPCOT depot which itself a sub depot and not a prime depot which is operated by Karaikudi division of Kumbakonam zone. Due to its operations as Subdepot, this Bus stand doesn't have dedicated long distance busses with origination from Manamadurai and always need to rely on adjacent depots of Sivagangai, Ramnad, Paramakudi, Madurai and Kamudhi for Local town and Moffusil Long distance services. Also due to the absence of a depot at Manamadurai, all bus services operated at Night mostly avoid picking and drop off passengers at Manamadurai despite being an important interchange transit place of Sivaganga district.
