= Nallur, Tiruvannamalai =

Neighbourhood in Tiruvannamalai district, Tamil Nadu, India

- Neighbourhood
- Nallur, Tiruvannamalai, Tamil Nadu
- Coordinates: 12.4087°N 79.6210°E
- Country: India
- State: Tamil Nadu
- District: Tiruvannamalai
- Elevation: 95.25 m (312.5 ft)

Population (2011)
  - Total: 5,976

Languages
  - Official: Tamil, English
  - Speech: Tamil, English
- Time zone: UTC+5:30 (IST)
- PIN: 604406
- Telephone code: +914183******
- Other Neighbourhoods: Navalpakkam, Thellar
- LS: Arani
- VS: Vandavasi

Nallur is a neighbourhood in Vandavasi taluk of Tiruvannamalai of Tamil Nadu state in India.

== Location ==
Nallur is located with the coordinates of 12.4087°N 79.6210°E near Vandavasi.

== Demographics ==
The total population of Nallur is 5,976, 3,049 of which are male, and 2,927 of which are female.

== Importance ==
A 11 year old sixth standard student Nalayini of Nallur village recites Tirukkural verses in any order.

== Worship ==
Sundara Varadharaja Perumal temple situated here in Nallur is worshipped by the people in and around this area.
