= Karumanoor =

Karumanur is an agriculture-based village in the Tiruchengode taluk of Namakkal district in Tamil Nadu state of India. This village is located at a distance of 16.5 km from Tiruchengode, 31 km from Salem city and 41 km from the district headquarters Namakkal. [1] It is situated in the south-western direction of Salem and north-eastern direction of Tiruchengode, just 3.5 km south from Mahendra Engineering college, Mallasamudram West.

== Water Resources ==
Karumanur Lake ensures that the ground water level is maintained in this village. A canal connects this lake with ponds and nearby lakes. Sand here is mixture of Red and Black loamy soil which best suits Tapioca, Groundnut, Mango, Cotton, Sugarcane, Caster Seeds and Coconut Tree cultivation.

== Temples ==
Famous "Kakathalaiamman temple" is located in the west entrance of this village. Several other temples like Karumanur Mariamman Temple, Kandasamy Temple and Kuthandeeswarar Temple is location within this village.

== Transport ==
Tamil Nadu State Government Operated Bus with Number 2B runs through this village. This bus connects Mallasamudram to Thindal(Erode) via Karumanur, Ramapuram, Moreplayam, Tiruchengode and Erode.

== Educational Institutions ==
1. Mahendra Institute of Technology Address : mahendhirapuri; mallasamudram (west); vadugapallayam post; tiruchengode; namakkal 637 503.[2] This college is located exactly 3.5 km north of Karumanur.

2. Mahendra School Address: Kallukadai. This school is located at 3 km north of Karumanur.

3. Siruvar Palli Address: Karumanur

== Other Facts ==
1. Pincode for Karumanur is 637503. [2]
