= Tiruchengode (disambiguation) =

Tiruchengode is a neighbourhood in Namakkal district, Tamil Nadu, India.

Tiruchengode may also refer to:

- Tiruchengode town
- Tiruchengode block
- Tiruchengode taluk
- Tiruchengode division
- Tiruchengode Assembly constituency
- Tiruchengode Lok Sabha constituency
