= Tirukkoyilur division =

Tirukkoyilur division is a revenue division in the Kallakurichi district of Tamil Nadu, India. Of the 22 revenue blocks in the viluppuram district, 4 blocks comes under this revenue division. They are, Kalrayanhills block, Chinnasalem block, Kallakurichi block and Sankarapuram block.
