= Erode (disambiguation) =

Erode is a city in the Indian state of Tamil Nadu.

Erode may also refer to:

- Erode district, one of the 38 districts in the state of Tamil Nadu
- Erode Mahesh, an Indian actor
- Erode (Lok Sabha constituency), a Lok Sabha constituency.
- Erode Nagaraj, a professional musician
- Erode block, a revenue block
- Erosion
- "Erode", by Dir En Grey from Missa, 1997
- "Erode", by Neurosis from A Sun That Never Sets, 2001

== See also ==
- Erosion (disambiguation)
