= Elathur =

Elathur may refer to:

- Elathur, Erode, a panchayat in Erode district, Tamil Nadu
- Elathur, Kozhikode, a panchayat in Kozhikode district, Kerala
- Elathur River, a river in Kozhikode district, Kerala
