= Pullur =

Pullur may refer to:

== Indian villages ==
- Pullur, Kasaragod, in Kerala state
- Pullur, Malappuram, in Kerala state
- Pullur, Telangana, in Medak district, Telangana state
- Pullur, Thrissur, in Kerala state

== See also ==
- Pulur (disambiguation)
