= N. S. Ramanuja Tatacharya =

Indian scholar (1928–2017)

Ramanuja Tatacharya
- Born: Navalpakkam S. Ramanuja Tatacharya; 1928; Navalpakkam, North Arcot, Tamil Nadu
- Died: 5 June 2017 (aged 88–89)
- Occupation: Sanskrit scholar

Navalpakkam Ramanuja Tatacharya (1928 – 2017) was a Sanskrit scholar from India. He received the Chevalier of Légion d'honneur which is the highest civilian honour of France. He was a researcher at the French Institute of Pondicherry. He was the first Vice Chancellor of the Kendriya Sanskrit Vidyapeeth, holding the office between 1989–1994. In 2016, he was awarded the Padma Bhushan, the third-highest civilian honour of India for his contribution to the field of Sanskrit literature and education.

Tatacharya was born on 16 April 1928 in the Navalpakkam village in the North Arcot district in Tamil Nadu to U.Ve.N.S. Krishnaswamy Tatacharya and Rajalakshmi. He died on 5 June 2017 in Mumbai.

== Awards ==
- Catussastra Praveena by the Sanskrit Sahitya Praishat, Tiruchi in 1981
- Maha Mahopadhyaya by the Rashtriya Sanskrit Vidyapeetham, Tirupati in 1996
- Vacahaspati Puraskar by the K. K. Birla Foundation with 1 Lac Indian Rupees in 2001
- The ‘Chevalier’ degree of the Order of the Legion of Honour by the Government of France, in recognition of his outstanding contribution to Sanskrit studies, in 2012
- The Viswabharati Award by the Government of Uttar Pradesh, in 2013
- The Padma Bhushan, India's third highest civilian honour by the Government of India for his outstanding contribution in the field of Sanskrit, in 2016.

== Works ==
=== Original works ===
- Vivriti - A Commentary on Jnapaka Sangraha (Vyakarana) pp. 225, Kendriya Sanskrit Vidyapeetha, Tirupati in 2002. This work was prescribed as a textbook in oriental colleges affiliated to S.V. University.
- Balabodhini - A Commentary on the Pancalaksani Gadadhari (Nyaya) pp. 237, Kendriya Sanskrit Vidyapeetha, Tirupati in 1990. The copies of the first printing exhausted and reprinted.
- Balapriya - A Commentary on the Tarkasangraha Dipika Prakasika (Nyaya) pp. 392, published in 1981 by Dr. N.Veezhinathan, Madras.
- Bhagavadgunaratnapeetika - A Commentary on the Gopalasahasranama, pp. 120, published by T. Devasthanams, Tirupati in 1986.
- Bhavabodhini - A Commentary on Paklsata Gadadhari (Nyaya), published by Kendriya Sanskrit Vidyapeetha, Tirupati in 1988 (pp. 426). # Sabdalaksanapramanya Vimarsa, Rastriya Sanskrit Sansthan in 1995.
- Yatarthakhyatibhushana 1994.
- Pratyaksha Tattvacintāmaṇi Vimarsa published by RSVP in 1992.
