= Vembarpatti =

Coordinates: 10°15′N 78°07′E

Vembarpatti is a small village located in Dindigul district in Tamil Nadu, India.

Its population is around 10,000 people. The town is surrounded by the Sirumalai Hills, Karundamalai Hills and Akkamma Hills. The town was ruled by Nayakars 300 years ago. There are many temples, churches and mosques in the town

Vembarpatti is one of the villages in Sanarpatti Taluk in Dindigul District in Tamil Nadu State. Vembarpatti is located 6.5 km from its Taluk Main Town Shanarpatti. Vembarpatti is 19.8 km from its District Main City Dindigul. It is 424 km from its State Main City Chennai.

Nearby villages are Gopalpatti (1.1 km), Kombaipatti (2 km), Kanavaipatti (2.8 km), Avilipatt I (4.3 km), Marunoothu (4.9 km), Anjukulipatti (5.3 km). Nearest towns are Shanarpatti (6.5 km), Nattam (13.3 km), Vadamadurai (21 km), Dindigul (22.8 km).
