= Rajapalayam (disambiguation) =

Rajapalayam may refer to:

- Rajapalayam, a city in Virudhunagar district in the Indian state of Tamil Nadu
- Rajapalayam (State Assembly Constituency), an assembly constituency located in Sivakasi Lok Sabha Constituency in Tamil Nadu
- Rajapalayam dog, an Indian Sighthound
- Rajapalayam block, a revenue block in the Virudhunagar district of Tamil Nadu, India
