= Pollachi (disambiguation) =

Pollachi is a town and a taluk headquarters in Coimbatore district.

Pollachi may also refer to:

- Pollachi (Lok Sabha constituency)
- Pollachi taluk
- Pollachi(South) Block
- Pollachi(North) Block
- Pollachi (state assembly constituency)
- Pollachi Junction railway station
- Pollachi Mappillai
