= Rangaswamy =

Surname

Rangaswamy is a surname. Notable people with the surname include:

- Rangaswamy Nataraja Mudaliar (1885–1972), Indian film director
- Rangaswamy Narasimhan (1926–2007), Indian computer and cognitive scientist
- Adithiya Rangaswamy (born 1994), Botswana cricketer
- Hotte Paksha Rangaswamy (1933–2007), political leader from the Indian state of Karnataka
- Jeevarathinam Rangaswamy (born 1921), a leader of Indian National Congress from Tamil Nadu
- M. Rangaswamy, Indian politician and was elected member for the Tamil Nadu Legislative Assembly
- N. Rangaswamy (born 1950), Indian politician, Chief Minister of the Union Territory of Puducherry
- Ponnuswamy Rangaswamy (born 1964), Indian weightlifter
- Shantha Rangaswamy, (born 1954), Indian cricketer
- Manchanahalli Rangaswamy Satyanarayana Rao (born 1948), Indian scientist from Mysore, India
- Rangaswamy Srinivasan (born 1929), physical chemist and inventor with a 30-year career at IBM Research

== See also ==
- Bilikal Rangaswamy Betta, hill near Kanakapura town in the Indian state of Karnataka
- Rangaswamy Peak and Pillar, rocky column in Kotagiri, The Nilgiris, Tamil Nadu
- K.S. Rangaswamy College of Technology, engineering college affiliated to Anna University, Chennai, Tamil Nadu, south India
