= Rasipuram (disambiguation) =

Rasipuram is a city in Namakkal district Tamil Nadu, India and a neighborhood of Namakkal city.

Rasipuram may also refer to these related to the city:

- Rasipuram (Lok Sabha constituency)
- Rasipuram (state assembly constituency)
- Rasipuram taluk, a subdistrict of Namakkal district
  - Rasipuram block, a revenue block
- Rasipuram railway station
- Rasipuram Narayan or R. K. Narayan, Indian writer
- Rasipuram Krishnaswamy Laxman, Indian cartoonist

== See also ==
- Raspuri, a variety of mango from India
