= Polur (disambiguation) =

Polur may refer to:

- Polur, a town in Tamil Nadu, India
  - Polur block, a revenue block in Tamil Nadu, India
  - Polur (state assembly constituency)
  - Polur taluk
- Polur temple, Kozhikode, a temple in Kerala, India
- Polur, Iran, a village in Iran

== See also ==
- Pulur (disambiguation)
- Pollur, a lake on the Faroe Islands
