= Nallankulam =

Coordinates: 8.4036604°N 77.6299577°E

- Village
- Interactive map of Nallankulam
- Country: India
- State: Tamil Nadu
- District: Tirunelveli district
- Taluk: Radhapuram
- PIN code: 627117

Nallankulam is a small village in Nanguneri block in Tirunelveli district of Tamil Nadu State, India. It comes under Dhalapathi Samuthram Panchayath.

== Demographics ==
Tamil is the local language.

== Government ==
=== Amenities ===
The postal head office is Dalapathisamudram.

== Transport ==
Nallankulam can be reach by train or bus. The nearest railway stations are Dalapathy Samudram Rail Way Station and Valliyur Rail Way Station.

The nearest bus stops are Thulukkarpatti, Good Samaritan Nagar, Rajarathna Nagar and Rajarethinam Nagar bus stops.

It is located 37 kilometres (23 mi) towards district headquarters in Tirunelveli, 11 kilometres (6.8 mi) from T.Nanguneri and 688 kilometres (428 mi) from Chennai. Vadakkuvalliyur, Panagudi, Nagercoil, Tirunelveli are the nearby cities.
