= Sendamangalam (disambiguation) =

Sendamangalam is a town, municipality, and taluk headquarters in Namakkal District, Tamil Nadu, India.

Sendamangalam may also refer to:

- Sendamangalam block, a revenue block in Namakkal District
- Senthamangalam (state assembly constituency)
