= Cheyyar (disambiguation) =

Cheyyar is a neighbourhood in Tiruvannamalai, Tamil Nadu, India

Cheyyar may also refer to other places in Tiruvannamalai, Tamil Nadu, India:

- Cheyyar block, a revenue block
- Cheyyar taluk, a taluk
- Cheyyar Assembly constituency, a state assembly constituency
- Cheyyar division, a revenue division
- Cheyyar River, an important seasonal river
