= Pudukkottai block =

Pudukkottai block is a revenue block in Pudukkottai district, Tamil Nadu, India. It has a total of 31 panchayat villages.

== Villages of Pudukkottai Block ==
1. Nathampannai (9a & 9b)
34.olagampaati 2. Athanakottai
3. Ganapathypuram
4. Kallukaranpatti
5. Karupudayanpatti
6. Kavinadu
7. Kilavattam
8. Kavinadu
9. Mela Vattam
10. Kuppayampatti
11. M.kulavaipatti
12. Manaviduthi
13. Mangalathupatti
14. Mukkampatti
15. Mullur, Pudukkottai
16. Perungalur
17. Perungkondanviduthi
18. Ponnamaravathi

19. Puthampoor
20. Samatividuthi
21. Seempattur
22. Sothupallai
23. Thirumalairaya
24. Samutharam
25. Thondaiman, Pudukkottai
26. Oorani
27. Vadavalam
28. Vagavasal
29. Valavampatti
30. Vanarapatti
31. Varapur
32. valyappati 33. Venndampaati
