= Puduchatram =

puduchatram
- Interactive map of puduchatram
- Coordinates: 11.384679°N 78.162495°E
- Country: India
- State: Tamil Nadu
- Block: Puduchatram
- District: Namakkal
- Time zone: UTC05:30 (IST)

Puduchatram is a Village located in the Namakkal district of Tamil Nadu state, India. It is the headquarter of Puduchatram block.

== Agriculture ==
Agriculture is a main source of revenue for nearby villages. The milk industry is also a major business in this area.

== Government sectors ==
Government Hospital, Puduchatram
Veterinary Hospital, Puduchatram
Union office, Puduchatram
Police station, Puduchatram
Traffic Police Station, Puduchatram
Sub Register office, Puduchatram
Village Administrative office, Puduchatram
Revinew Inspector Office
Agriculture office
Post Office
Electricity Board Office
Telephone Exchange Office
Cooperative milk society
Cooperative handloom weavers society
Government Hospital

== Schools and colleges ==
- Schools

Government Elementary School, Puduchatram.
Government Higher Secondary School, Puduchatram.
Rainbow Matriculation School, Puduchatram.
Vivekananda Vidyalaya Matriculation School, Puduchatram.
RGR Matric hr. sec school & International CBSE School, Puduchatram.
PAAVAI Vidyashram CBSE School, Puduchatram.
Gnanodhaya CBSE and Matriculation School, Puduchatram.

- Colleges

Paavai Engineering College
Paavai College of Engineering
Paavai Polytechnic College
Paavai Teacher Training Institute
Rainbow Teacher Training Institute
Paavai Arts & Science College for Women
Paavai College of Management Studies
Ganamani College Of Technology
Gnanamani Engineering College
Government Arts And Science College, AndagalurGate

== Nearby cities and towns ==
- Cities

Salem, Trichy, Coimbatore, Erode and Tiruppur.

- Towns

Namakkal, Rasipuram, Tiruchengode, Paramathi velur

== Nearby tourist places ==
- Kolli Hills

Kolli Hills was ruled by a king called valvil ori, one of the seven kings of the sangam age. A statue for him is located at semmedu at a distance of 58 kilometers from Puduchatram.

- Yercaud

Yercaud at a distance of 62.7 kilometers from Puduchatram.
