= Vriddhachalam block =

Coordinates: 11.50°N 79.33°E

Vriddhachalam block is a revenue block of Cuddalore district of the Indian state of Tamil Nadu. This revenue block consist of 51 panchayat villages.

== List of Panchayat Villages ==
| SI.No | Panchayat Village |
|---|---|
| 1 | Aladi |
| 2 | Alichikudi |
| 3 | Chinnakandiyankuppam |
| 4 | Chinnaparur |
| 5 | Earumanur |
| 6 | Edachithur |
| 7 | Edaiyur |
| 8 | Gopurapuram |
| 9 | Ka.Elamangalam |
| 10 | Karnatham |
| 11 | Karuvepilankurichi |
| 12 | Katchirayanatham |
| 13 | Kattiyanallur |
| 14 | Kattuparur |
| 15 | Ko.Pavalangudi |
| 16 | Ko.Poovanur |
| 17 | Kodukkur |
| 18 | Komangalam |
| 19 | Kovilanur |
| 20 | Kuppanatham |
| 21 | M.Parur |
| 22 | M.Patti |
| 23 | M.Pudur |
| 24 | Manavalanallur |
| 25 | Mathur |
| 26 | Mu.Agaram |
| 27 | Mugundanallur |
| 28 | Narumanam |
| 29 | Paravalur |
| 30 | Peralaiyur |
| 31 | Perambalur |
| 32 | Periyavadavadi |
| 33 | Puliyur |
| 34 | Puthukooraipettai |
| 35 | Rajendirapattinam |
| 36 | Rupanarayananallur |
| 37 | Sathiyavadi |
| 38 | Sathukudal Keelpathi |
| 39 | Sathukudal Melpathi |
| 40 | Sembalakurichi |
| 41 | Siruvambar |
| 42 | Sitherikuppam |
| 43 | T.Mavidanthal |
| 44 | T.V.Puthur |
| 45 | Thoravalur |
| 46 | Thottikuppam |
| 47 | Vannankudikadu |
| 48 | Vetakudi |
| 49 | Vijayamanagaram |
| 50 | Vilankattur |
| 51 | Visaloor |
