= Erosion (disambiguation) =

Erosion is the gradual removal or degradation of a substance by various mechanisms.

Erosion may also refer to:

- Erosion (dermatopathology)
- Erosion (morphology)
- Acid erosion or tooth erosion
- Aeolian erosion or wind erosion
- Bank erosion
  - Fluvio-thermal erosion
- Bone erosion
- Coastal erosion
- Soil erosion

== See also ==
- Erode (disambiguation)
