= Kattuvelampalayam =

Coordinates: 11.2649°N 77.8426°E

Kattuvelampalayam KVP-Kattuvelampalayam KVP
- village
- Interactive map of Kattuvelampalayam
- Country: India
- State: Tamil Nadu
- District: Namakkal
- Taluk: Thiruchengode

Languages
  - Official: Tamil
- Time zone: UTC+5:30 (IST)
- PIN: 637210

Kattuvelampalayam is a village of Namakkal district in the state of Tamil Nadu, India.

== Location ==
Kattuvelampalayam is located in the bank of the river Cauvery. The nearest towns are Erode (18–20 km; 11–12 mi) and Tiruchengode (15–16 km; 9.3–9.9 mi). It comes under the Erayamangalam panchayat.

== Demographics ==
Nearly 200 families of different castes live in the area, and most are dependent on agriculture. Rice, turmeric, sugar cane and ground nuts are the major crops cultivated throughout the year. Kattuvelampalayam has one co-operative society. It has political leader from TVK and ADMK parties.

== Education ==
KVP has one Punchayat union government School. The nearest Govt HR secondary school is in the neighbouring Erayamangalam.

== Water resources ==
Kattuvelampalayam is located in the bank of the river Cauvery. And landwater to be provided to KVP for peoples usage.compare to other areas here water resource is good.

== Sports ==
KVP young boys (2021)
