= Nallur block =

Nallur block is a revenue block of Cuddalore district of the Indian state of Tamil Nadu. This revenue block consist of 64 panchayat villages.

== List of Panchayat Villages ==
SI.No	Panchayat Village
1	A.Agaram
2	A.Chithur
3	A.Marur
4	Adhamangalam
5	Adhiyur
6	Arugeri
7	Dheevalur
8	Elangiyanur
9	Eraiyur
10	Erappavur
11	Ganapathikurichi
12	Gudalur
13	Ivathagudi
14	Karaiyur
15	Kattumailur
16	Keelkurichi
17	Kilimangalam
18	Ko.Kothanur
19	Kodikalam
20	Konur
21	Kosapallam
22	Kothattai
23	Kovilur
24	Kurukathancheri
25	Maduravalli
26	Maligaikottam
27	Maligaimedu
28	Mannampadi
29	Maruthathur
30	Me.Mathur
31	Melur
32	Murugankudi
33	N.Naraiyur
34	Nagar
35	Nallur
36	Narasingamangalam
37	Niramani
38	Pa.Kothanur
39	Pasikulam
40	Pe.Ponneri
41	Pe.Poovanur
42	Pelanthurai
43	Periyanesalur
44	Pinjanur
45	Poolambadi
46	Sathiyam
47	Sepakkam
48	Sethuvarayankuppam
49	Sevur
50	Sirumangalam
51	Sirunesalur
52	Soundracholapuram
53	T.Pudaiyur
54	Thalanallur
55	Thirupayar
56	Thiruvattathurai
57	Tholar
58	Thuraiyur
59	Vadakarai
60	Valasai
61	Vannathur
62	Varambanur
63	Venkarumbur
64	Veppur
