= Sangagiri block =

Coordinates: 11.48°N 77.87°E

Sangagiri block is a revenue block of Salem district of the Indian state of Tamil Nadu. This revenue block consist of 22 panchayat villages. They are:

1. Alathur
2. Devannagoundanur
3. Katheri
4. Koneripatti
5. Morur East
6. Olakkachinnanur
7. Sanyasipatti Agraharam
8. Veerachipalayam
9. Annathanapatti
10. Irugalur
11. Kaveripatti
12. Koneripatti Agrm.
13. Morur West
14. Pullagoundampatti
15. Sungudivaradhampatti
16. Chinnagoundanur
17. Iveli
18. Kaveripatti Agraharam
19. Kottavaradhampatti
20. Mottaiyanur
21. Pullagoundampatti Agrm.
22. Vadugapatti
