= Anakavoor block =

Anakavoor block is a development block in the Tiruvannamalai district of Tamil Nadu, India. It has a total of 55 Gram panchayats. Anakavoor Community development block office is working in Anakkavur Gram pachayat.

== List of Gram panchats ==
1. Akkur
2. Alathur
3. Alathurai
4. Anakkavoor
5. Anappathur
6. Arasur
7. Athi
8. Cheyyatraivendran
9. Chithamur
10. Echur
11. Eleneerkundram
12. Erumaivetti
13. Irungal
14. Karanai
15. Kizhathur
16. Kizhkolathur
17. Kilneerkundram
18. Kilnethapakkam
19. Kulamandai
20. Koolamandhal
21. Kottagaram
22. Kovilur
23. Kunnavakkam
24. Kurumbur
25. Madipakkam
26. Mahajanampakkam
27. Melkolathur
28. Melma
29. Melnemaili
30. Mulagiripattu
31. Nallalam
32. Narmapallam
33. Nedungal
34. Nelvoy
35. Paiyur
36. Perumbalai
37. Pazhanjur
38. Purisai
39. Sengadu
40. Soundaryapuram
41. Thavasi
42. Thennelapakkam
43. Theneluppai
44. Thenkalpakkam
45. Themavandhal
46. Thenthandalam
47. Thethurai
48. Thirumpoondi
49. Ukkal
50. Vachanoor
51. Vadalapirathan
52. Vadathinnalur
53. Veerampakkam
54. Vellai
55. Vengodu
