= Nallur Sundara Varadharaja Perumal Temple =

Sundara Varadharaja Perumal Temple
- Sundara Varadharaja Perumal Temple, Nallur, Tiruvannamalai, Tamil Nadu

Religion
- Affiliation: Hinduism
- District: Tiruvannamalai
- Deity: Sundara Varadharaja Perumal
- Festival: Vaikuntha Ekadashi

Location
- Location: Nallur, Tiruvannamalai, Tamil Nadu, India
- State: Tamil Nadu
- Country: India
- Interactive map of Sundara Varadharaja Perumal Temple
- Coordinates: 12.4086°N 79.6212°E

Architecture
- Type: Dravidian architecture
- Completed: 500 years ago

Specifications
- Temple: One
- Elevation: 96.33 m (316 ft)

Varadharaja Perumal Temple is a 500 year old vaishnavite temple at Nallur neighbourhood in Tiruvannamalai of Tamil Nadu state in India.

The presiding deity in this temple is Sundara Varadharaja Perumal and goddess is Sundaravalli Thaayaar. Garudaallhvar is at the feet of the main deity in worshipping posture.

== Location ==
This temple is located with the coordinates of 12.4086°N 79.6212°E in Tiruvannamalai.
