= Government College of Education, Komarapalayam =

College in Tamil Nadu, India

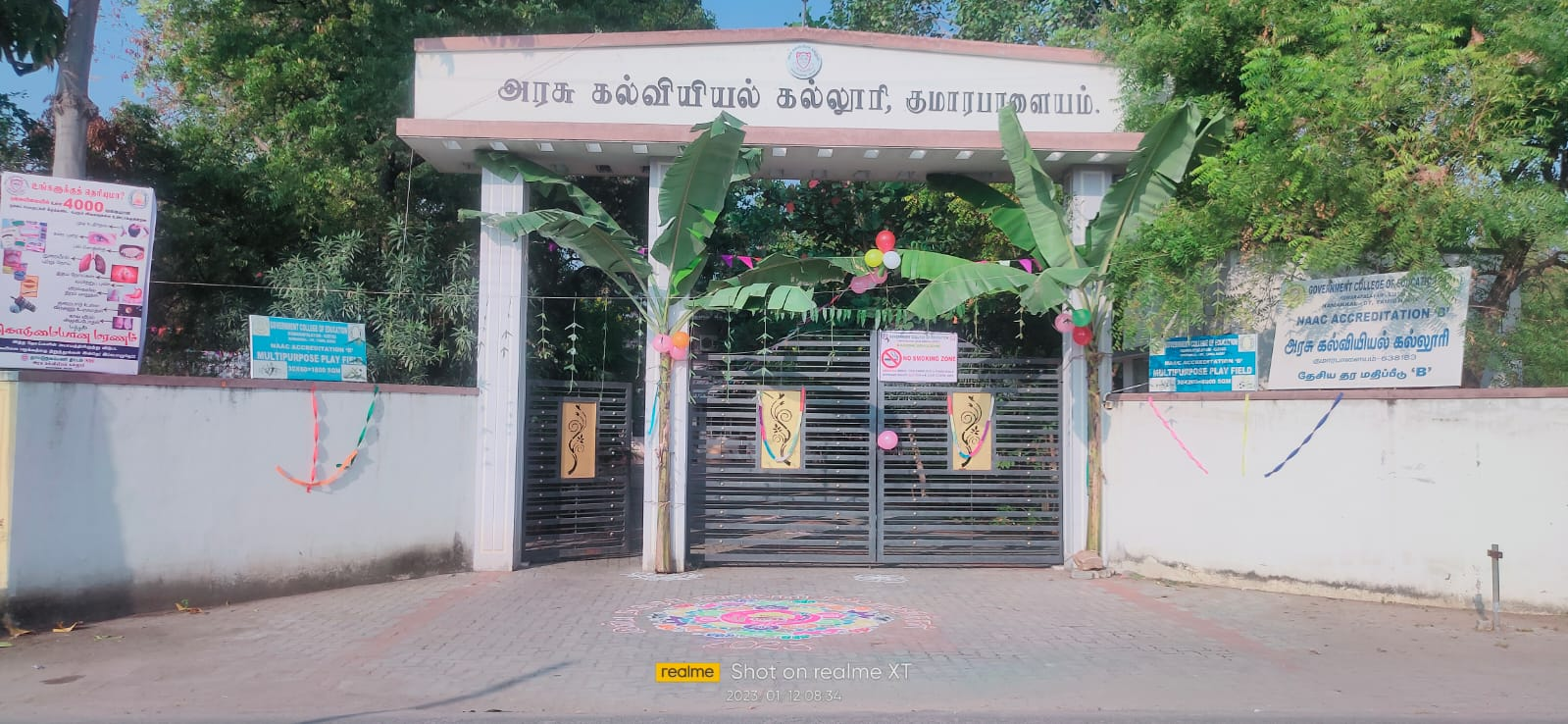
- Type: public government education college
- Established: 1955; 70 years ago
- Academic affiliations: Tamil Nadu Teachers Education University
- Principal: A. John Peter
- Location: Komarapalayam, Tamil Nadu, India
- Campus: Semi urban
- Website: gcekpm.ac.in

Government College of Education, Komarapalayam is a co-educational, state government education college located at Komarapalayam in Namakkal District of Tamil Nadu State.

== History ==
GCE, Komarapalayam was established in the academic year 1955-56 by then Government of Madras (now Tamil Nadu Government). Earlier it was affiliated to the University of Madras, Chennai. Originally, the college offered B.Ed. Degree course. and the Pandit Training Course. M.Ed. Degree Course was started as an evening course during the year 1974 – 1975. In October 1976 the Pandit Training Course was wound up and in the year 1982 – 1983 M.Ed. Degree Course was converted into a full time course. The college became a co-education institution during the academic year 1990–1991. The college is functioning as an affiliated institute of Tamil Nadu Teachers Education University, Chennai which was established during 2008–2009. Government College of Education, Komarapalayam is approved by the National Council for Teacher Education (NCTE), New Delhi. The college is also accredited with "B" Grade by the National Assessment and Accreditation Council (NAAC) in 2nd cycle of accreditation.

== Location ==
The college is located on the Olapalayam road of Komarapalayam. Komarapalayam is a textile town situated on the bank of the river Cauvery and Bhavani River of South India, and is a taluk of Namakkal District, Tamil Nadu, India.

== Departments ==
The following teaching departments are established and functioning now

- Tamil
- English
- Mathematics
- Physical sciences
- Biological sciences
- History
- Education

== Infrastructure ==
- Hostel For Boys and Girls
- Basketball court
- Play ground
- Seminar Hall
- Kamarajar building
- Psychology laboratory
- language laboratory
- library

== See also ==
- List of Tamil Nadu Government Arts and Science Colleges
- List of educational institutions in Namakkal district
