= Pulur =

Pulur may refer to:

- Gökçedere, Demirözü, town in Bayburt Province, Turkey
- Ovacık, Tunceli, town in Tunceli Province, Turkey
- Polur, Iran, village in Iran

== See also ==
- Pullur (disambiguation)
- Polur (disambiguation)
