= Thiruvarankulam block =

Thiruvarankulam is a revenue block in Pudukkottai district, Tamil Nadu, India. It has a total of 48 panchayat villages.

== Villages of thiruvarankulam block ==
1. Alankadu
2. Arayapatti
3. Isugupatti
4. K.rasiamangalam
5. K.v.kottai
6. Kaikurichi
7. Kalangudi
8. Kallalangudi
9. Karumbirankottai
10. Kathakurichi
11. Kayampatti
12. Keelathur
13. Kothakottai
14. Kothamangalam, Pudukkottai
15. Kovilur, Pudukkottai
16. Kulamangalam North
17. Kulamangalam South
18. Kuppakudi
19. L.n.puram
20. Mangadu, Pudukkottai
21. Maniambalam
22. Manjanviduthi
23. Melathur
24. Nagaram, Pudukkottai
25. Neduvasal East
26. Neduvasal West
27. Palaiyur
28. Pallathividuthi
29. Panankulam
30. Patchikkottai
31. Pathampatti
32. Poovarasakudi
33. Pudukkottaividuthi
34. Pullanviduthi
35. S.kulavaipatti
36. Senthakudy
37. Senthankudi
38. Seriyalur Inam
39. Seriyalur Zamin
40. Thatchinapuram
41. Thirukkattalai
42. Thiruvarankulam
43. Vadakadu
44. Vallathirakottai
45. Vandakkottai
46. Venkitakulam
47. Vennavalkudy
48. Veppankudi
