= Bukkampatti =

- Village
- Location in Tamil Nadu, India
- Coordinates: 11°51′03″N 77°57′23″E
- Country: India
- State: Tamil Nadu
- District: Salem

Languages
  - Official: Tamil
- Time zone: UTC+5:30 (IST)
- PIN: 636451

Bukkampatti is a Village Panchayat in Mettur taluk in Salem district in the Indian state of Tamil Nadu.

== Demographics ==
It has a population of about 4,206 persons in around 1,035 households. The village is famous for its export business of handloom silks.

=== Education Schools ===
1. Panchayat Union Middle School, Bukkampatti
2. Government High School, Bukkampatti
