= Elathur, Erode =

Elathur
- Panchayat town
- Location in Tamil Nadu, India
- Coordinates: 11.386944°N 77.307778°E
- Country: India
- State: Tamil Nadu
- District: Erode
- Taluk: Nambiyur

Area
  - Total: 8.13 km^{2} (3.14 sq mi)

Population (2011)
  - Total: 7,827
  - Density: 963/km^{2} (2,490/sq mi)

Languages
  - Official: Tamil
- Time zone: UTC+5:30 (IST)

Elathur is a panchayat town in Nambiyur Taluk of Erode district in the Indian state of Tamil Nadu. It is located in the north-western part of the state. Spread across an area of 8.13 km^{2} (3.14 sq mi), it had a population of 7,827 individuals as per the 2011 census.

== Geography and administration ==
Elathur is located in Nambiyur taluk, Gobichettipalayam division of Erode district in the Indian state of Tamil Nadu. Spread across an area of 8.13 km^{2} (3.14 sq mi), it is one of the 42 panchayat towns in the district. It is located in the north-western part of the state towards the southern end of the Indian peninsula.

The town panchayat is headed by a chairperson, who is elected by the members chosen by the people through direct elections. The town forms part of the Gobichettipalayam Assembly constituency that elects its member to the Tamil Nadu legislative assembly and the Tiruppur Lok Sabha constituency that elects its member to the Parliament of India.

This town panchayat includes surrounding villages:

1. E. Chettipalayam
2. E. Karattupalayam
3. Vettaiyampalayam

== Demographics ==
As per the 2011 census, Elathur had a population of 7,827 individuals across 2,404 households. The population saw a marginal increase compared to the previous census in 2001 when 7,678 inhabitants were registered. The population consisted of 3,876 males and 3,951 females. About 660 individuals were below the age of six years. The entire population is classified as urban. The town has an average literacy rate of 60.8%. About 81.8% of the population belonged to scheduled castes.

About 51.5% of the eligible population were employed. Hinduism was the majority religion which was followed by 98.6% of the population, with Christianity (1.2%) and Islam (0.1%) being minor religions.
