= Bhuvanagiri block =

Coordinates: 11.47°N 79.63°E

Bhuvanagiri block is a revenue block of Cuddalore district of the Indian state of Tamil Nadu. This revenue block consist of 47 panchayat villages.

== List of Panchayat Villages ==
SI.No	Panchayat Villages
1	Agara Alambadi
2	Alchikudi
3	Ambalpuram
4	Ammankuppam
5	Anaivari
6	B.Adanoor
7	B.Odaiyur
8	Boothavarayanpettai
9	C.Mutlur
10	Chinnanerkunam
11	Chokkankollai
12	Ellaikudi
13	Erumbur
14	Jayankondam
15	Karaimedu
16	Kasba Alambadi
17	Kathazhai
18	Keelvalayamadevi
19	Kilavadinatham
20	Kizhamungiladi
21	Kummudimoolai
22	Lalpuram
23	Manjakollai
24	Maruthur
25	Melamanakudi
26	Melamoongiladi
27	Melannuvampattu
28	Melvalayamadevi
29	Miralur
30	Nathamedu
31	Nellikollai
32	P.Kolakudi
33	Periyanerkunam
34	Pinnalur
35	Prasannaramapuram
36	Sathapadi
37	Sitheri
38	Theethampalayam
39	Therkkuthittai
40	Thillainayagapuram
41	Thurinjikollai
42	Uluthur
43	Vadakkuthittai
44	Vadakrishnapuram
45	Vadathalaikulam
46	Vatharayanthethu
47	Veeramudaiyanatham
