= Talavasal block =

Revenue block in Tamil Nadu, India

Talavasal block is a revenue block of Salem district of the Indian state of Tamil Nadu. The block consists of 35 panchayat villages.
