= Thanthoni block =

Revenue block in India

Thanthoni block is a revenue block in the Karur district of Tamil Nadu, India. It has a total of 18 panchayat villages.
