= Peddanaickenpalayam block =

Revenue block in Salem, Tamil Nadu, India

Peddanaickenpalayam block is a revenue block in the Salem district of Tamil Nadu, India. It has a total of 36 panchayat villages.
