= Gingee block =

Coordinates: 12.15°N 79.30°E

The Gingee block is a revenue block in the Viluppuram district of Tamil Nadu, India. It has a total of 60 panchayat villages.
