= Kulittalai block =

Revenue block in Karur, Tamil Nadu, India

Kulittalai block is a revenue block in the Karur district of Tamil Nadu, India. It has a total of 13 panchayat villages.
