= Anaivari =

- Village
- Location in Tamil Nadu, India Anaivari (India)
- Coordinates: 11.26°N 79.32°E
- Country: India
- State: Tamil Nadu
- District: Cuddalore

Languages
  - Official: Tamil
- Time zone: UTC+5:30 (IST)
- PIN: 608702
- Lok Sabha constituency: Chidambaram

Anaivaari is a village in the Cuddalore District of the Indian state Tamil Nadu. One of The fastest developing village in Cuddalore District. Anaivaari is located near Sethiyathoppu, on the National Highway NH 45C- that connects Vikravandi-Kumbakonam-Thanjavur. The village is in Mel Bhuvanagiri panchayat Union and in Bhuvanagiri Taluk. Sethiyathoppu is the nearest panchayat town. Chidambaram Vadalur, Srimushnam and Vriddhachalam are the nearest towns.

Anaivaari is the birthplace of the well known Tamil poet, Wruter, Editor of Kavikuyil Tamil monthly, and Sahitya Akademi Translator Dr. Anaivaari Ramanujam Anandan alias Kavikkuyil Dr Anaivaariyar, (Called in the name of this village). He is the recipient of Tamil Nadu Govt. Best translator award in 2018. He was working in the Tamil Nadu Medical Service in the Dept. of Indian Medicine and Homoeopathy as Special Officer, Translation and Publication of Siddha Works and Cudgeon Leaves. There he translated and published 12 Tamil Siddha Medical Text books in English. He was the research Scholar in the History of Siddha Medicine and his Ph.D. work, Siddha Maruthuva Varalaaru, has been prescribed in the curriculum of BSMS, and MD(Siddha) by the Ayush Dept, Govt. of India, since 2013. He has authored 90 plus books in Tamil and English in almost all the genere of Tamil Literarture viz: Poetry, Drama, Novel, Lyrics, Literary Journal (Kavikuyil), children works and science and medical works too! His master piece Aangila Thirukkural -Tamil & English, is the best seller on Amazon sales that stands on the top of first 100 translation works since 2021.

In addition, Kavikkuyil Dr. Anaivaariyar has established a forum for Tamil development in the name of SETHIYATHOPPU THAMIZH MANDRAM TRUST from 2023.

== AgriCulture ==
It is Agriculture dependent Village. Main Agriculture crops are Paddy and Suger Cane.

== School ==
Panchayat Union Elementary School

== Temples ==
One of the famous Kali Amman temple placed in Anaivari Mettu Street and Periyandavar with Periyanayagi and Paavadai royan staues are there in West street. And Veeranar, Pillaiyar, Aiyanar, Karuppannaswamy Temple.

Temples
