= Melur block =

Coordinates: 10.05°N 78.33°E

The Melur block is a revenue block in the Madurai district of Tamil Nadu, India. It has a total of 36 panchayat villages.
