= Andanallur block =

Revenue block in Tiruchirappalli, Tamil Nadu, India

The Andanallur block is a revenue block in the Tiruchirappalli district of Tamil Nadu, India. It has a total of 25 panchayat villages.

== Andhanalur ==
1. Andhanalur
2. Ammankudi
3. Thindukarai
4. Maangarai
5. Elamanur
6. Jiyaburam

== Kambarasampettai ==
1. Kambarasampettai
2. Kadalur
3. mallachipuram
4. Periyarnagar

== Mutharasanallur ==
1. Mutharasanallur
2. Murungapettai
