= Valangaiman block =

Coordinates: 10.756866°N 79.370662°E

Valangaiman block is a revenue block in the Valangaiman taluk of Tiruvarur district, Tamil Nadu, India. It has a total of 50 panchayat villages.
