= Krishnarayapuram block =

Krishnarayapuram block is a revenue block in the Karur district of Tamil Nadu, India. It has a total of 23 panchayat villages.
