= Thoothukudi block =

Thoothukudi block is a revenue block in the Thoothukudi district of Tamil Nadu, India. It has a total of 20 panchayat villages.
