= Aarani block =

Coordinates: 12.5044°N 79.1308°E

Aarani block is a revenue block in the Tiruvannamalai district of Tamil Nadu, India. It has a total of 38 panchayat villages.
