= Nilakottai block =

Coordinates: 10.17°N 77.87°E

Nilakottai block is a revenue block in the Dindigul district of Tamil Nadu, India. It has a total of 23 panchayat villages.
