= Thiruverumbur block =

Revenue block in India

Thiruverumbur block is a revenue block in the Tiruchirappalli district of Tamil Nadu, India. It has a total of 20 panchayat villages.
