= Talanayar block =

Revenue block in Nagapattinam district, Tamil Nadu, India

Talanayar block is a revenue block in Nagapattinam district, Tamil Nadu, India. There are a total of 27 panchayat villages in this block.
