= Shanarpatti block =

Shanarpatti block is a revenue block in the Dindigul district of Tamil Nadu, India. It has a total of 21 panchayat villages.

== Village panchayats in Shanarpatti block ==
1. Anjukulipatti
2. Avilipatti
3. Emmakalapuram
4. Kambiliyampatti
5. Kanavaipatti
6. Kombaipatti
7. Koovanuthu
8. Madur
9. Marunoothu
10. Ragalapuram
11. Rajakkapatti
12. Sengurichi
13. Shanarpatti
14. Silluvathur
15. T.panchampatti
16. Thavasimadai
17. Thimmanallur
18. Vajira Servaikaran Kottai
19. V.t.patti
20. Veerasinnampatti
21. Vembarpatti
