= Harur block =

Revenue block in Dharmapuri district, Tamil Nadu, India

Harur block is a revenue block in the Dharmapuri district of Tamil Nadu, India. It has a total of 34 panchayat villages.
