= Karunkulam block =

Karunkulam block is a revenue block in the Thoothukudi district of Tamil Nadu, India. It has a total of 31 panchayat villages.
