= Achipatti =

- Village Panchayat
- Location in Tamil Nadu, India Achipatti (India)
- Coordinates: 10°41′56″N 77°0′54″E
- Country: India
- State: Tamil Nadu
- District: Coimbatore
- Founder: Rahul Ramfort

Population (2011)
  - Total: 9,849

Languages
  - Official: Tamil
- Time zone: UTC+5:30 (IST)
- Postal code: 642002
- Vehicle registration: TN-41

Achipatti is a Village Panchayat in Coimbatore district in the Indian state of Tamil Nadu. It is suburb of Pollachi. Its pincode is 642002.

== Demographics ==
As of the 2001 India census, Achipatti had a population of 7459. Males constitute 51% of the population and females 49%. Achipatti has an average literacy rate of 75%, higher than the national average of 59.5%; with 55% of the males and 45% of females literate. 10% of the population is under 6 years of age.
