= Rajasingamangalam block =

Revenue block in Tamil Nadu, India

Rajasingamangalam block is a revenue block in the Ramanathapuram district of Tamil Nadu, India. It has a total of 35 panchayat villages. Tamil Nadu's second largest water resources in here.
