= Erayamangalam =

Coordinates: 11.2666°N 77.8341°E

Erayamangalam, also written Iraiyamankalam, is a small village and Panchayat located in Namakkal district (Tamil Nadu / India) on the bank of the Kaveri River.

== Education ==
Erayamangalam has a Government HR secondary school.

== Gallery ==
Images of Erayamangalam
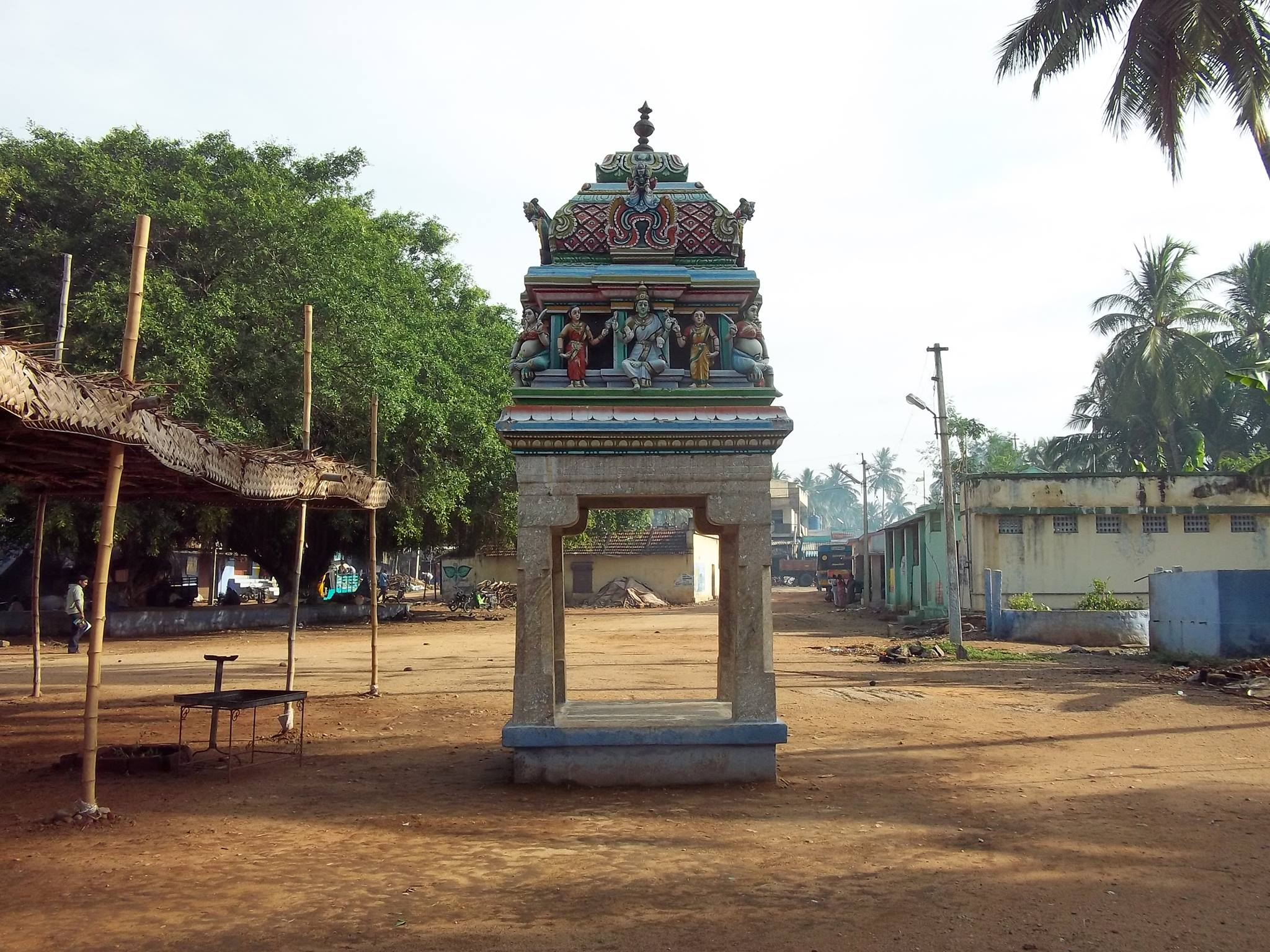
Erayamangalam Temple

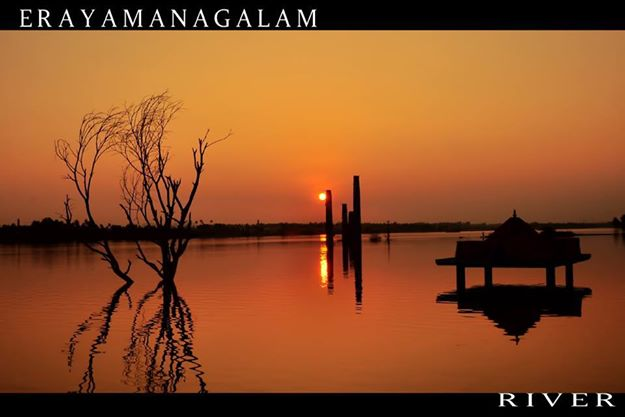
The Kaveri River at Erayamangalam

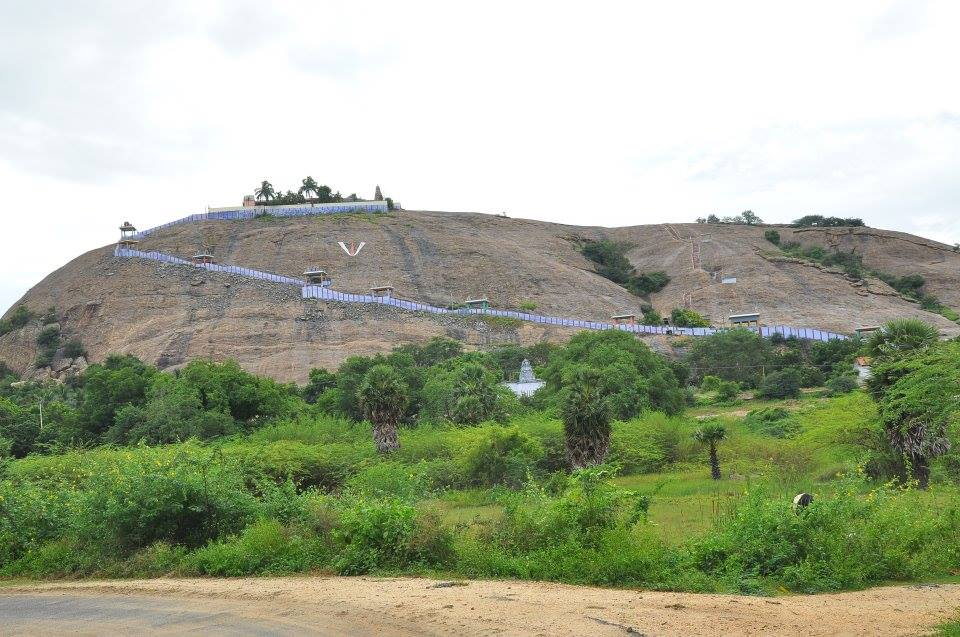
Ilayaperumal mountain temple

== See also ==
- Kattuvelampalayam, a village within the Panchayat
