= Elachipalayam block =

Elachipalayam is a revenue block, in the Namakkal district and Tiruchengode Taluk of Tamil Nadu, in India.Pin Code 637202 It includes :

1. Agaram,
2. Akkalampatty,
3. Bommampatty,
4. Chinnamanali,
5. Elangar,
6. Elupili,
7. 85 Goundampalayam,
8. 87 Goundampalayam,
9. Kilapalayam,
10. Kokkalai,
11. Konnaiyar,
12. Koothampoondi,
13. Kuppandapalayam,
14. Lathuvadi,
15. Manathi,
16. Mandagapalayam,
17. Marukalampatty,
18. Mavureddipatty,
19. Molipali,
20. Musiri,
21. Nallipalayam,
22. Periyamanali,
23. Pokkampalayam,
24. Punjaiputhupalayam,
25. Pullagoundampatty,
26. Puthur East,
27. Sakthinaicampalayam,
28. Thondipatty,
29. Unjanai.
