= Karur block =

Revenue block in India

Karur block is a revenue block in the Karur district of Tamil Nadu, India. It has a total of 14 panchayat villages.
