= Manikandam block =

The Manikandam Block is a revenue block in the Tiruchirappalli district of Tamil Nadu, India. Manikandam Pincode is 620012. It has a total of 22 panchayat villages.

Manikandam Panchayat union/block has 22 villages as per Tiruchirappalli administration rural development list:

1. Adhavathur
2. Allithurai
3. Alundur
4. Ammapettai
5. Ariyavoor
6. K. Kallikudi
7. Kulathur
8. Kumaravayalur
9. Mathur
10. Mekkudi
11. Mudikandam
12. Nachikurichy
13. Nagamangalam
14. Navalurkottapattu
15. Paganur
16. Periyanayakichatram
17. Punganur
18. Sethurapatti
19. Somarasampettai
20. Thayanur
21. Thirumalaisamudram
22. Thorakkudy.
