= Tiruchuli block =

Tiruchuli block is a revenue block in the Virudhunagar district of Tamil Nadu, India. It has a total of 40 panchayat villages.
