= Vadipatti block =

Vadipatti block is a revenue block in the Madurai district of Tamil Nadu, India. It has a total of 23 panchayat villages.
