= Guziliamparai block =

Guziliamparai block is a revenue block of Dindigul district of the Indian state of Tamil Nadu. This revenue block consist of 17 panchayat villages.

They are, Alambadi, Chinnuluppai, D. Guddalore, Dholipatti, Karikali, Karungal, Koombur, Kottanatham, Landhakottai, Mallapuram, R. Kombai, R. Pudukottai, R. Vellodu, Thirukurnam, Ulliyakottai, Vadugampadi and Vanikarai.

Guziliamparai is announced as new taluk on 31.12.17 by honourable chief minister Edappadi K. Palaniswami.
