= Paramakudi block =

Paramakudi block is a revenue block in the Ramanathapuram district of Tamil Nadu, India. It has a total of 39 panchayat villages.
