= Villivakkam block =

Coordinates: 13.1101°N 80.2095°E

The Villivakkam block is a revenue block in the chennai district of Tamil Nadu, India. It has a total of 13 panchayat villages.

== Villages ==
- Alathur
- Karlampakkam
- Vellacheri
- Pandeswaram
- Arakkambakkam
- Pothur
- Pammadhukulam
