= Sivakasi block =

Sivakasi block is a revenue block in the Virudhunagar district of Tamil Nadu, India. It has a total of 54 panchayat villages.
