= Muthupet block =

Muthupet block is a revenue block in Tiruvarur district, Tamil Nadu, India. It has a total of 29 panchayat villages.
