= Musiri block =

Revenue block in India

The Musiri block is a revenue block in the Tiruchirappalli district of Tamil Nadu, India. It has a total of 33 panchayat villages.
