= Nannilam block =

Coordinates: 10.88°N 79.62°E

Nannilam block is a revenue block in the Nannilam taluk of Tiruvarur district, Tamil Nadu, India. It has a total of 48 panchayat villages.
