= Madhuranthaganallur =

Madhuranthaganallur (Maranthur)
- Village
- Location within Tamil Nadu Location within India
- Coordinates: 11°24′12″N 79°35′41″E
- Country: India
- State: Tamil Nadu
- District: Cuddalore
- Subdistrict: Chidambaram

Area
  - Total: 8 km^{2} (3.1 sq mi)
- Elevation: 6 m (20 ft)

Population (2014)
  - Total: 550
  - Density: 69/km^{2} (180/sq mi)

Languages
  - Official: Tamil
- Time zone: UTC+5:30 (IST)
- PIN: 608201
- Telephone code: 04144
- Vehicle registration: TN-31(until April 2014)

Madhuranthaganallur is a village located in the Keerapalayam panchayath, Chidambaram taluk, Cuddalore district in the Indian state of Tamil Nadu.

It is located 49 km to the south of District headquarters Cuddalore, 8 km from Keerapalayam, 230 km from state capital Chennai.

Chidambaram, Neyveli, Cuddalore, Sirkali, Virudhachalam are the nearby cities to Madhuranthaganallur.

Nearby Railway Stations is Chidambaram- 14 km . Nearby Airports Chennai Airport- 207 km, Trichy Airport - 170 km.

== List of streets ==
- Agrahaaram Street
- Sivan koil Street
- Reddiyar Mettu Street
- East Street
- West Street
- North Street
- South Street
- Main Road
- New Street
- Kuttakaran Street
- Manthakarai Street
- Periya Street (North)
- Periya Street (South)
- Small Street
- Puram Harijana Street

== Nearby schools ==
1. Panchayath Union Middle School Madhuranthaganallur.
2. Aadi dravidar Government Higher Secondary School Madhuranthaganallur.
3. Thiruvalluvar Higher Secondary School Orathur - 3 km.
4. DGM Higher Secondary School Sethiathope - 9 km.
5. RCTHSS, Ramakrishna, Nandanar, Pachayapa, Nirmala matric, Venus Matric, Kamaraj Matric Higher Secondary schools in Chidambaram - 11 km.

== Nearby university and colleges ==
1. Annamalai University in Chidambaram - 11 km.
2. Sri Ragavendra Arts and Science College Keezhmoongiladi - 15 km.
3. MRK Institute of Technology - Kattumannarkoil - 20 km.

== Tourist and historic places to visit ==
1. periya nayagi temple in madhuranthaganallur
2. sivan temple in madhuranthaganallur
3. perumal temple in madhuranthaganallur
4. Sri Ragavendra Swami birthplace in Buvangiri - 7 km.
5. Nataraja Temple in Chidambaram - 11 km.
6. Pichavaram Mangrove Forest - 20 km.
7. Cuddalore Silver Beach - 57 km.
8. Velankanni Temple - 125 km.
