= Ayipettai =

- village
- Location in Tamil Nadu, India Ayipettai (India)
- Coordinates: 11°26′15″N 79°36′28″E
- Country: India
- State: Tamil Nadu
- District: Cuddalore

Population
  - Total: nearly 1,000

Languages
  - Official: Tamil
- Time zone: UTC+5:30 (IST)
- Vehicle registration: TN-

Ayipettai is a village in the Chidambaram taluk in the Indian state of Tamil Nadu.
