= Sedapatti block =

Revenue block in Tamil Nadu, India

Sedapatti block is a revenue block in the Madurai district of Tamil Nadu, India. It has a total of 31 panchayat villages.
