= Sethiyur =

- village
- Location in Tamil Nadu, India Sethiyur (India)
- Coordinates: 11.3832400°N 79.55987°E
- Country: India
- State: Tamil Nadu
- District: Cuddalore

Languages
  - Official: Tamil
- Time zone: UTC+5:30 (IST)

Sethiyur is a village in Cuddalore district, Tamil Nadu, on the south-west coast of India. It has a population of 1,347.
