= Thiruthiraipoondi block =

Revenue block in India

Thiruthiraipoondi block is a revenue block in the Thiruthiraipoondi taluk of Tiruvarur district, Tamil Nadu, India. It has a total of 32 panchayat villages.
