= Mangadu, Pudukkottai =

மாங்காடு (English: Mangadu) is gram panchayat in Pudukkottai, Tamil Nadu, India. It is part of the legislative constituency of Alangudi. Thiruvarangulam is the union block. It's located 30 km east to its headquarters. The village is named for its natural aspirants. The major agricultural produce in the village includes mango, jackfruit, bananas, peanuts, jasmines, and coconuts. Moivirunthu is considered an integral part of life in Mangadu.
