= Uthangarai block =

Revenue block in Tamil Nadu, India

Coordinates: 12.2659119°N 78.5352087°E

The Uthangarai block is a revenue block in the Krishnagiri district of Tamil Nadu, India. In total, it contains 34 panchayat villages.
