= Vikravandi block =

The Vikravandi block is a revenue block in the Viluppuram district of Tamil Nadu, India. It has a total of 45 panchayat villages.
