= Uppiliyapuram block =

Revenue block in India

Uppiliyapuram block is a revenue block in the Tiruchirappalli district of Tamil Nadu, India. It has a total of 19 panchayat villages.
