= Chellampatti block =

Revenue block in Tamil Nadu, India

Chellampatti block is a revenue block in the Madurai district of Tamil Nadu, India. It has a total of 29 panchayat villages.
