= Kelamangalam block =

Revenue block in Tamil Nadu, India

The Kelamangalam block is a revenue block in the Krishnagiri district of Tamil Nadu, India. It has a total of 28 panchayat villages.
