= Vaiyampatti block =

Administrative division of Tamil Nadu, India

Vaiyampatti block is a revenue block in the Tiruchirappalli district of Tamil Nadu, India. It has a total of 18 panchayat villages. Region of Cauvery Delta in Chola Nadu.
