= Kallikudi block =

Kallikudi block is a revenue block in the Madurai district of Tamil Nadu, India. It has a total of 36 panchayat villages.
