= Reddiyarchatiram block =

Reddiyarchatiram block is a revenue block of Dindigul district of the Indian state of Tamil Nadu. This revenue block consist of 24 panchayat villages.

They are,
Adaloor, Alagupatti, Ammapatti, Anumandarayankottai, Dharmathupatti, G.nadupatti, Gurunathanacikanur, Kamatchipuram, Karisalpatti, Kasavanampatti, Konur, Kothapulli, Kuttathupatti, Mangarai, Murunellikottai, Neelamalaikottai, Palakanuthu, Pandrimalai, Pannaipatti, Ponnimanthurai, Puduchatram, Pudukottai, Pudupatti, Silvarpatti.
