= Manamelkudi block =

Manamelkudi block is a revenue block in Pudukkottai district, Tamil Nadu, India. It has a total of 28 panchayat villages.

== Villages of Manamelkudi Block ==
1. Ammapattinam
2. Bramanavayal
3. Edayathimangalam
4. Edayathoor
5. Kanadu
6. Karakathikottai
7. Karakottai
8. Kattumavadi
9. Keelamanjakudi
10. Kolendram
11. Kottaipattinam
12. Krishnajipattinam
13. Manaloor, Pudukkottai
14. Manamelkudi
15. Manjakudi
16. Minnamozhi
17. Mumpalai
18. Nelveli
19. Nerkuppai, Pudukkottai
20. Nilayur
21. Perumaruthur
22. Sathiyadi
23. Seyyanam
24. Thandalai, Pudukkottai
25. Thinayakudi
26. Vellur, Pudukkottai
27. Vettivayal
28. Vichoor, Ammapattinam
29. MelaPappanoor
30. Kelapappanoor
