= Chetpet block =

Revenue block in Tamil Nadu, India

Chetpet block is a revenue block in the Tiruvannamalai district of Tamil Nadu, India. It has a total of 49 panchayat villages.
