= Veppanthattai block =

Revenue block in India

Veppanthattai block is a revenue block in the Perambalur district of Tamil Nadu, India. It has a total of 29 panchayat villages.
