= Radhapuram block =

Revenue block in Tirunelveli, Tamil Nadu, India

Radhapuram block is a revenue block in the Tirunelveli district of Tamil Nadu, India. It has a total of 27 panchayat villages.
