= Nallampalli block =

Nallampalli block is a revenue block in the Dharmapuri district of Tamil Nadu, India. It has a total of 32 panchayat villages. The Powergrid corporation in Dharmapuri district is situated in this block area along Hogenakkal-Dharmapuri State Highway
