= Rishivandiyam block =

Revenue block in Tamil Nadu, India

The Rishivandiyam block is a revenue block in the Kallakurichi district of Tamil Nadu, India. It has a total of 53 panchayat villages.
