= Konganapuram block =

Konganapuram block is a revenue block in the Salem district of Tamil Nadu, India. It has a total of 9 panchayat villages.
