= Manapparai block =

Coordinates: 10.60759°N 78.414874°E

Manapparai block is a revenue block in the Tiruchirappalli district of Tamil Nadu, India. It has a total of 21 panchayat villages.
