= Manachanallur block =

The Manachanallur block is a revenue block in the Tiruchirappalli district of Tamil Nadu, India. It has a total of 35 panchayat villages.
