= Puduchatram block =

Puduchatram block is a revenue block in the Namakkal district of Tamil Nadu, India. The block has a total of 21 panchayat villages. The headquarter of the block is in Puduchatram town.
