= Kalrayan Hills block =

The Gingee block is a revenue block in the Kallakurichi district of Tamil Nadu, India. It has a total of 15 panchayat villages.
