= Nagapattinam block =

Coordinates: 10.77°N 79.83°E

Nagapattinam block is a revenue block in the Nagapattinam taluk of Nagapattinam district, Tamil Nadu, India. There are a total of 27 panchayat villages in this block.
