= Keelaiyur block =

Keelaiyur block is a revenue block in the Kilvelur taluk of Nagapattinam district, Tamil Nadu, India. There are a total of 27 panchayat villages in this block.
