= Nangavalli block =

Nangavalli block is a revenue block of Salem district of the Indian state of Tamil Nadu. This revenue block consist of 9 panchayat villages:

1. Avadathur
2. Chinnasoragai
3. Gonur
4. Karikkapatti
5. Periyasoragai
6. Sanarapatti
7. Surapalli
8. Thoramangalam
9. Veerakkal
