= Vembakkam block =

Revenue block in India

The Vembakkam block is a revenue block in the Tiruvannamalai district of Tamil Nadu, India. It has a total of 64 panchayat villages.
