= Needamangalam block =

Revenue block in India

Needamangalam block is a revenue block in the Needamangalam taluk of Tiruvarur district, Tamil Nadu, India. It has a total of 44 panchayat villages.
