= Srivilliputtur block =

Srivilliputtur block is a revenue block in the Virudhunagar district of Tamil Nadu, India. It has a total of 29 panchayat villages.
