= Andipatti block =

Revenue block in India

Coordinates: 10°00′N 77°37′E

Andipatti block is a revenue block in the Theni district of Tamil Nadu, India. It has a total of 30 panchayat villages.
