= Thottiyam block =

The Thottiyam block is a revenue block in the Tiruchirappalli district of Tamil Nadu, India. It has a total of 26 panchayat villages.
