= Vetri Vinayaha College of Engineering and Technology =

Engineering college in India

Vetri Vinayaha College Of Engineering and Technology
- Other names: VVCET
- Motto: Victory through Virtue
- Type: Self - Financing
- Established: 2006
- Affiliations: Anna University
- Chairman: G. Sekar
- Principal: Dr. Kavipriya
- Location: Namakkal , Tamil Nadu, India; 11°0′11″N 78°30′0″E
- Campus: Rural (Vetri Campus)
- Website: www.vetrivinayaha.org

Vetri Vinayaha College of Engineering and Technology is a Private Engineering College located in Thottiyam, Tiruchirappalli District, India. The college was established in the year 2006 by Thiru G. Sekar .

== Course Offered (Departments) ==
1. B.E / Civil Engineering.
2. B.E / Computer Science Engineering.
3. B.E / Electronic Communication Engineering.
4. B.E / Electric and Electronic Engineering.
5. B.E / Mechanical Engineering.

== Eligibility for Admission ==
Candidates should have passed in the H.S.C Examination of the State Board of Tamil Nadu or any other equivalent examination.

== Transport ==
More than 30 college buses help the students & staff to commute to the college from various places especially all city areas.

== Hostel ==
There are separate hostels for Boys and Girls in the campus. Boy's hostel is situated inside the college campus in an area of 5,000 sq.ft of land The Boys Hostel accommodates 600 boy's and the Girls hostel accommodates 300 Girls.

== Library ==
The Vetri Vinayaha College Of Engineering And Technology Library established in the year 2006 July was housed in a class room with 3500 books to start with.
