= Mecheri block =

Mecheri block is a revenue block in the Salem district of Tamil Nadu, India. It has a total of 17 panchayat villages.

== See also ==
- Bukkampatti
