= Kodaikanal block =

Coordinates: 10.23°N 77.48°E

Kodaikanal block is a revenue block in the Dindigul district of Tamil Nadu, India. It has a total of 15 panchayat villages.
