= Pudur block =

Pudur block is a revenue block in the Thoothukudi district of Tamil Nadu, India. It has a total of 44 panchayat villages.
