= Virudhunagar block =

Coordinates: 9°35′N 77°57′E

Virudhunagar block is a revenue block in the Virudhunagar district of Tamil Nadu, India. It has a total of 58 panchayat villages.
