= Tirupathur block =

Tirupathur block is a revenue block of Tirupathur district of the Indian state of Tamil Nadu. This revenue block consists of 35 panchayat villages.
