= Kayathar block =

Kayathar block is a revenue block in the Thoothukudi district of Tamil Nadu, India. It has a total of 45 panchayat villages.
