= Melmalayanur block =

Revenue block in Viluppuram, Tamil Nadu, India

The Melmalayanur block is a revenue block in the Viluppuram district of Tamil Nadu, India. It has a total of 55 panchayat villages.
