= Tirukkoyilur block =

The Thirukkoyilur block is a revenue block in the Kallakurichi district of Tamil Nadu, India. It has a total of 52 panchayat villages.
