= West Aarani block =

West Aarani block is a revenue block in the Tiruvannamalai district of Tamil Nadu, India. It has a total of 37 panchayat villages.
