= Dindigul block =

Place in the Dindigul district of Tamil Nadu, India

Coordinates: 10.35°N 77.95°E

Dindigul block is a revenue block in the Dindigul district of Tamil Nadu, India. It has a total of 14 panchayat villages.
