= Pernamallur block =

The Pernamallur block is a revenue block in the Tiruvannamalai district of Tamil Nadu, India. It has a total of 57 panchayat villages.
