= Gobichettipalayam block =

Gobichettipalayam block is a revenue block in the Erode district of Tamil Nadu, India. It has a total of 21 panchayat villages.
