= Pullur, Telangana =

Pullur
- village
- Location in Telangana, India Pullur (India)
- Coordinates: 18.1°N 78.85°E
- Country: India
- State: Telangana
- District: Siddipet

Population (2011)
  - Total: 2,923

Languages
  - Official: Telugu
- Time zone: UTC+5:30 (IST)
- PIN: 502107
- Telephone code: [91] 08457
- Vehicle registration: TS-15
- Nearest city: Siddipet
- Lok Sabha constituency: Siddipet
- Vidhan Sabha constituency: Siddipet

Pullur is a village in Siddipet District in the state of Telangana, India.

== Geography ==
It has an average elevation of 475 metres (1558 feet). Pullur is major village in Siddipet Mandal. It is situated 7 km away from Siddipet town and on the way from siddipet to Nizamabad. Another "Pullur" in the same name are located in Thrissur and Malappuram districts in Kerala and Ramnad district in Tamil Nadu.

== Demographics ==
As of 2011 India census, Pullur had a population of 2923 with 1475 males and 1448 females.
