= Modakurichi block =

Modakurichi block is a revenue block in the Erode district of Tamil Nadu, India. It has a total of 26 panchayat villages.
