= Periyakulam block =

Periyakulam block is a revenue block in the Theni district of Tamil Nadu, India. It has a total of 17 panchayat villages.
