= T. Kallupatti block =

Revenue block in Tamil Nadu, India

T.Kallupatti block, is a revenue block in the Madurai district of Tamil Nadu, India. It has a total of 42 panchayat villages.
