= Rajendirapattinam =

Rajendrapattinam
- village
- Interactive map of Rajendrapattinam
- Coordinates: 11°25′29″N 79°20′36″E
- Country: India
- State: Tamil Nadu
- District: Cuddalore
- Taluk: Virudhachalam

Rajendirapattinam is a village in Tamil Nadu, India.

== The village ==
- Assembly Constituency : Virudhachalam (152)
- Parliamentary Constituency : Cuddalore (26)
- Total Electors : 1784 (as of January 2014)
- Total Male Electors : 913
- Total Female Electors : 871
