= Ramanathapuram block =

Ramanathapuram block is a revenue block in the Ramanathapuram district of Tamil Nadu, India. It has a total of 25 panchayat villages.
