= Reddiyur, Tirupathur district =

Reddiyur
- village
- Location in Tamil Nadu, India
- Coordinates: 12°36′40″N 78°41′37″E
- Country: India
- State: Tamil Nadu
- District: Tirupathur

Population
  - Total: 1,401

Languages
  - Official: Tamil
- Time zone: UTC+5:30 (IST)
- Vehicle registration: TN-

Reddiyur is a village in Tirupathur district, Tamil Nadu, India. It is located in the Yelagiri Hills, near Jolarpet.
