= Sattur block =

Sattur block is a revenue block in the Virudhunagar district of Tamil Nadu, India. It has a total of 46 panchayat villages.
