= Kovilpatti block =

Coordinates: 9.17°N 77.87°E

Kovilpatti block is a revenue block in the Thoothukudi district of Tamil Nadu, India. It has a total of 38 panchayat villages.
