= Thirupparankunram block =

Thirupparankunram block is a revenue block in the Madurai district of Tamil Nadu, India. It has a total of 43 panchayat villages.
