= Mannargudi block =

Coordinates: 10.663°N 79.445°E

Mannargudi block is a revenue block in the Mannargudi taluk of Tiruvarur district, Tamil Nadu, India. It has a total of 51 panchayat villages.
