= Kanai block =

The Kanai block is a revenue block in the Viluppuram district of Tamil Nadu, India. It has a total of 51 panchayat villages.
