= Uthamapalayam block =

Uthamapalayam block is a revenue block in the Theni district of Tamil Nadu, India. It has a total of 13 panchayat villages.
