= Thiruchendur block =

Thiruchendur block is a revenue block in the Thoothukudi district of Tamil Nadu, India. It has a total of 11 panchayat villages.
