= Bodinayakanur block =

Bodinayakanur block is a revenue block in the Theni district of Tamil Nadu, India. It has a total of 15 panchayat villages.
