= Keelpennathur block =

The Keelpennathur block is a revenue block in the Tiruvannamalai district of Tamil Nadu, India. It has a total of 45 panchayat villages.
