= Alanganallur taluka =

Coordinates: 10°02′46″N 078°05′13″E

Alanganallur revenue block in the Madurai district of Tamil Nadu, India. It has a total of 37 panchayat villages. It has the same name and boundaries as the revenue block.

== Panchayat villages ==
The thirty-seven panchayat villages in Alanganallur are:
