= Mudukulathur block =

Mudukulathur block is a revenue block in the Ramanathapuram district of Tamil Nadu, India. It has a total of 46 panchayat villages.
