= Pudupalayam block =

Pudupalayam block is a revenue block in the Tiruvannamalai district of Tamil Nadu, India. It has a total of 37 panchayat villages.
