= Kadaiyampatty block =

Kadaiyampatty block is a revenue block in the Salem district of Tamil Nadu, India. It has a total of 17 panchayat villages.
