= Valasakkadu, Cuddalore =

Valasakkadu
- Village
- Location in Tamil Nadu, India Valasakkadu (India)
- Coordinates: 11°40′58″N 79°41′59″E
- Country: India
- State: Tamil Nadu
- District: Cuddalore
- Taluk: Srimishnam
- PIN: 608701

Valasakkadu is a panchayat village in Srimishnam Taluk, Cuddalore district, Tamil Nadu, India. The village has a total population of 1470 people with an even male-female ratio.
