= Udangudi block =

Coordinates: 8°25′29″N 78°00′35″E

Udangudi block is a revenue block in the Thoothukudi district of Tamil Nadu, India. It has a total of 17 panchayat villages.
