= Paavai Engineering College =

Indian college

Coordinates: 11.3990297°N 78.1606668°E

- Motto: Prosper Excel Conquer
- Type: Education and research institution
- Established: 2001
- Chairman: CA NV Natarajan
- Principal: Dr.M.Premkumar
- Undergraduates: 1200
- Location: Puduchatram, Namakkal, Tamil Nadu, India
- Campus: 12.18 acres (0.0493 km^{2})
- Website: pec.paavai.edu.in

Paavai Engineering College (PEC) was established in 2001 at Namakkal, Tamil Nadu, India. It is affiliated to Anna University and part of the Paavai Institutions along with Paavai College of Engineering, Paavai College of Technology. It is accredited by the National Board of Accreditation.

== History ==
Paavai Engineering College started in 2001. Before that Paavai Polytechnic college was started in 1998. The first batch passed out in 2005.

== Academics ==
There are 19 undergraduate departments, granting Bachelor of Engineering degrees in Aeronautical Engineering, Agricultural Engineering, Civil Engineering, Computers Science Engineering, Computers Science Engineering, Computers Science Engineering, Electronics & Communication Engineering, Electrical & Electronics Engineering, Mechanical Engineering, Information Technology, Mechatronics Engineering, Food Technology, Biotech, Chemical engineering, Pharmaceutical engineering, Cyber Security, Artificial Intelligence And Data Science, Robotics and Automation. The first four courses are accredited by the National Board of Accreditation. Postgraduate courses, granting ME are taught in Computer Science, Engineering Design, Power Electronics & Drivers and VLSI Design. PEC also grants degrees for Master Of Computer Application and Master Of Business Administration.

65% of the students are admitted through Anna University single window counseling and the rest are through entrance exams.

== Activities ==
Vintage cars were displayed during the Mechanical Engineering department's symposium "Plasma 2008" in 2008.

== Features ==
Microsoft Innovation center , Infosys Campus Connect , Cambridge ESOL Examination Center, Spoken Tutorial, QEEE Center, Paavai Moodle

== Placements ==
PEC reported a notable increase in placements in the academic year 2006−2007. In January 2006, a job fair war held in Paavai Institutions in which companies including MPhasis, Hurix Systems, HCL, SPI Technologies and KGISL participated in the fair. One company that conducted a recruitment drive at the campus in 2007 was Chennai-based Care Voyant Technologies. Paavai also promote "find your own job program" where student has to find their job.

== Sports achievements ==
Paavai Engineering College is the "Champion of Champions" at The Anna University Sports Board competitions http://paavai.edu.in/campus-life/sports-games/

== Technical symposium ==
The ten BE departments are conducting national level technical symposium every academic year, namely Techfinix Techfinix'18 (academic year 2017-2018) http://pec.paavai.edu.in/Techfinix18 Techfinix'16 (academic year 2016-2017) http://paavai.edu.in/paavai-events/pec_symposium/

== Timeline ==
- 2008- 3rd graduation day ceremony was held. Dr. C. Subramaniam, vice-chancellor, Tamil University, Thanjavur was the chief guest.
- 2009- 4th graduation day ceremony was held in March. VIT University Chancellor G. Viswanathan was chief guest.
- 2010- 5th graduation day ceremony was held in March.M.Thangaraju, Periyar University Vice-Chancellor, was the chief guest for the graduation day. Mupperum Vizha, Graduation Day, Toppers Noon and Cultural Festival of Paavai Educational Institutions were celebrated. Society of Civil Engineers was inaugurated. Post Graduate programmes in the institutions of Paavai Educational Group was inaugurated by K. Karunakaran, Vice-Chancellor, Anna University of Technology, Coimbatore.
- 2011- 6th graduation day ceremony was held in March.SRM Institute of Science and Technology Chancellor and Founder of Indiya Jananayaka Katchi. T.R. Pachamuthu was the chief guest. BusinessLine Club was launched in October.
- 2012-The 11th annual day of PEC was organised in February.Poet, orator and writer Kabilan Vairamuthu was the chief guest. The seventh graduation day was held in May.P. Mannar Jawahar, Vice-Chancellor, Anna University, Chennai was the chief guest.
- 2014- The 13th annual day was held on 6 February 2014. Kiran Bedi was the chief guest.
