= Kariapatti block =

Virudhunagar district revenue block in Tamil Nadu, India

Kariapatti block is a revenue block in the Virudhunagar district of Tamil Nadu, India. It has a total of 36 panchayat villages.
