= Thurinjapuram block =

Thurinjapuram block is a revenue block in the Tiruvannamalai district of Tamil Nadu, India. It contains a total of 47 panchayat villages.
