= Olakkur block =

Coordinates: 12°18′30″N 79°42′05″E

The Olakkur block is a revenue block in the Viluppuram district of Tamil Nadu, India. It has a total of 52 panchayat villages.
