= Pollachi(North) Block =

Pollachi(North) block is a revenue block of Coimbatore district of the Indian state of Tamil Nadu. This revenue block consist of 39 panchayat villages.

== List of Panchayat Villages ==
They are,

SI.No	Panchayat Village
1	A.Nagoor
2	Achipatti
3	Anupparpalayam
4	Avalappampatti
5	Ayyampalayam
6	Bodigoundenpalayam
7	Bodipalayam
8	Chikkarayapuram
9	Chinnanegamam
10	Devambadi
11	Eripatti
12	Giddasuramplm
13	Gollapatti
14	Kabulipalayam
15	Kallipatti
16	Kondegoundenplm
17	Kullakkapalyaam
18	Kullichettiplm
19	Kurumbapalayam
20	Mannur
21	Moolanur
22	N.Chandrapuram
23	Nalluthukuli
24	Okkilipalayam
25	Poosaripatti
26	Puliampatti
27	Puravipalayam
28	R.Ponnapuram
29	Ramapattinam
30	Rasakapalayam
31	Rasichettipalayam
32	Santhegoundenplm
33	Servakaranplm
34	Thalakkarai
35	Thimmankuthu
36	Thippampatti
37	Vadakkipalayam
38	Vellalapalayam
39	Z.Muthur
