= Vadamadurai block =

Vadamadurai block is a revenue block in the Dindigul district of Tamil Nadu, India. It has a total of 15 panchayat villages.
