= Ambasamudram block =

Coordinates: 8°41′49″N 77°28′22″E

Ambasamudram block is a revenue block in the Tirunelveli district of Tamil Nadu, India. It has a total of 12 panchayat villages.
