= Oddanchatram block =

Coordinates: 10°29′18″N 77°44′05″E

Oddanchatram block is a revenue block in the Dindigul district of Tamil Nadu, India. It has a total of 35 panchayat villages.

The villages are:

- Ambilikai
- Arasappapillaipatti
- Athikombai
- Chatrapatti
- Chinnakkampatti
- D.pudukottai
- Edayakottai
- Ellaipatti
- I.vadipatti
- Javadupatti
- Johipatti
- K.keeranur
- Kalanjipatti
- Kappiliapatti
- Kaveriammapatti
- Kethaiyurumbu
- Kollapatti
- Kuthiluppai
- Lakkayankottai
- Mandavadi
- Markkampatti
- Odaipatti
- Periakottai
- Puliyurnatham
- Pulliamarathukottai
- Reddiapatti
- Sindalaipatti
- Sindalavadampatti
- Thangachiammapatti
- Vadakadu
- Valayapatti
- Veeralapatti
- Velur-annapatti
- Veriyappur
- Virupatchi
