= Irugalur =

Panchayat village in India

Coordinates: 11°22′N 77°16′E

- Panchayat village
- Interactive map of Irugalur
- Country: India
- State: Tamil Nadu
- Region: Salem (Kongu Nadu)
- District: Salem District
- Taluk: Sangagiri taluk

Languages
  - Official: Tamil
- Time zone: UTC+5:30 (IST)
- PIN: 637103
- Telephone code: 91(04283
- Vehicle registration: TN 52

Irugalur is a panchayat village in Salem District of Tamil Nadu state, India. Irugalur has a population of about 2291.
