= Nathampannai =

- Town
- Location in Tamil Nadu, India
- Coordinates: 10°24′33″N 78°47′28″E
- Country: India
- State: Tamil Nadu
- District: Pudukkottai

Population (2001)
  - Total: 6,398

Languages
  - Official: Tamil
- Time zone: UTC+5:30 (IST)

Nathampannai is a panchayat town in Pudukkottai district in the Indian state of Tamil Nadu.

== Demographics ==
As of 2001 India census, Nathampannai had a population of 6398. Males constitute 50% of the population and females 50%. Nathampannai has an average literacy rate of 72%, higher than the national average of 59.5%: male literacy is 79%, and female literacy is 65%. In Nathampannai, 12% of the population is under 6 years.
