= Mallasamudram =

- Town panchayat
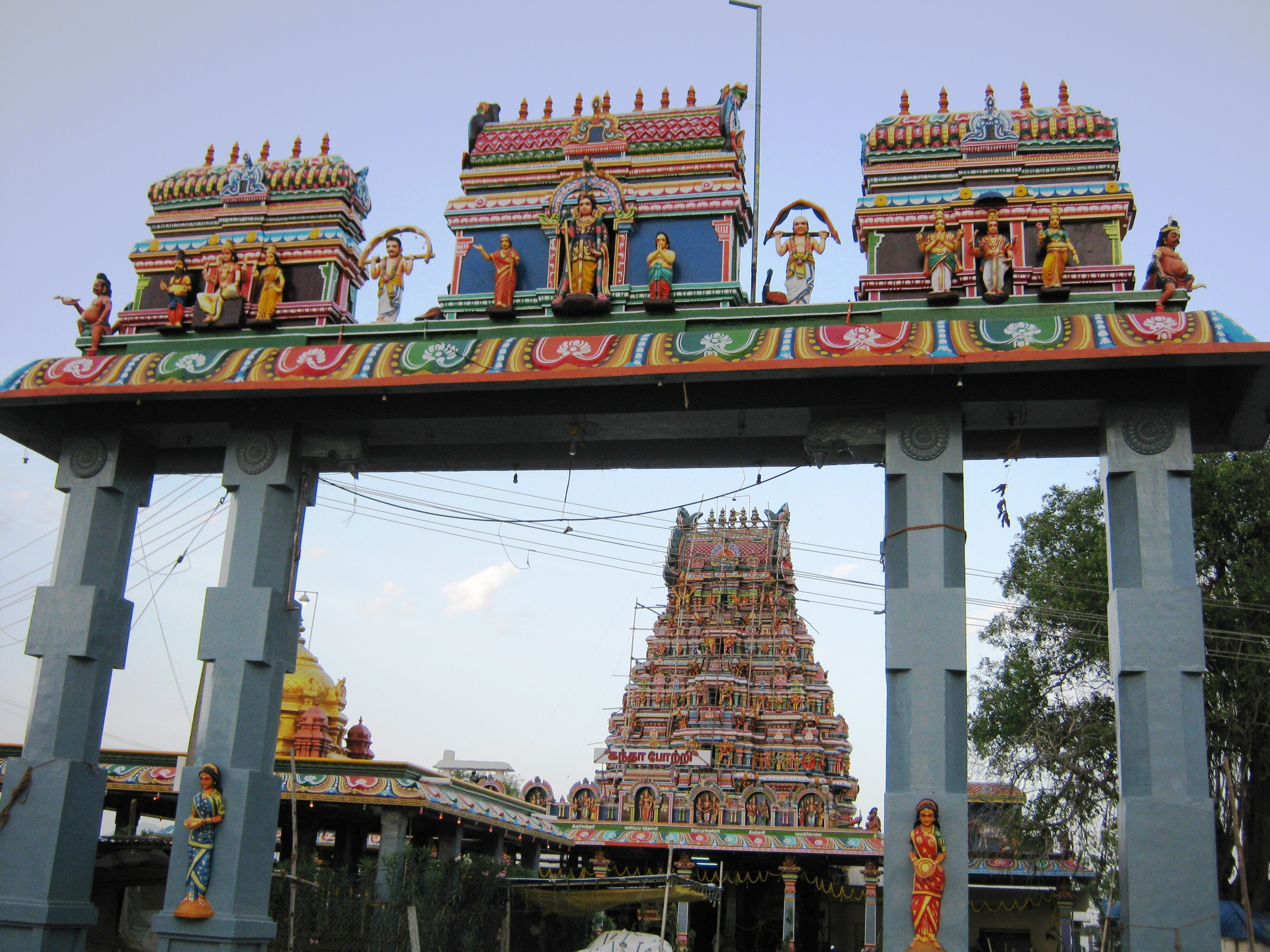
- Sri Kandaswamy Temple

- Location in Tamil Nadu, India
- Coordinates: 11°28′48″N 78°1′48″E
- Country: India
- State: Tamil Nadu
- District: Namakkal

Area
  - Total: 10.36 km^{2} (4.00 sq mi)
- Elevation: 224 m (735 ft)

Population (2011)
  - Total: 18,007
  - Density: 1,738/km^{2} (4,502/sq mi)

Languages
  - Official: Tamil
- Time zone: UTC+5:30 (IST)
- Postal code: 637503

Mallasamudram is a town panchayat in Tiruchengode taluk of Namakkal district in the Indian state of Tamil Nadu. It is located along the Salem–Tiruchengode road, approximately 28 km (17 mi) from Salem and 50 km (31 mi) from Namakkal. Spread across an area of 10.36 km^{2} (4.00 sq mi), the town panchayat is divided into 15 wards. It had a population of 18,007 as per the 2011 census.

== Geography and administration ==
Mallasamudram is located in Tiruchengode taluk of Namakkal district in the Indian state of Tamil Nadu. The town panchayat covers an area of 10.36 km^{2} (4.00 sq mi) and is divided into 15 wards. The panchayat administration is responsible for providing basic services including maintenance of roads, water supply, health and sanitation. Mallasamudram is part of the Mallasamudram block, consisting of 27 villages.

Mallasamudram forms part of the Tiruchengode Assembly constituency of the Tamil Nadu Legislative Assembly and the Namakkal Lok Sabha constituency.

== Demographics ==
According to the 2011 census, Mallasamudram had a population of 18,007 across 4,895 households. The population consisted of 9,104 males and 8,903 females, with a sex ratio of approximately 978 females per 1,000 males. About 1,529 (8.5%) of the population were children aged less than six years. The town had a literacy rate of approximately 75.9%, with male literacy at 83.4% and female literacy at 68.2%. Scheduled Castes accounted for approximately 15.2% of the population, while Scheduled Tribes accounted for less than 0.1%.

As per the 2011 census, Hinduism was the predominant religion, practiced by 97.6% of the population, followed by Islam (1.6%) and Christianity (0.7%). Mallasamudram has several places of worship, including the Kalipatty Kandhasamy Temple, Periya Mariamman Temple and Soleshwarar Temple. The annual Thaipusam festival is an important religious event in the area. The Ardhanareeswarar Temple at Tiruchengode is located approximately 24 km (15 mi) from Mallasamudram.

== Economy ==
The area contains predominantly red soil, and the agricultural lands are generally irrigated by tanks and wells. Millets, pulses, and oil seeds are the major crops, and others include sugercane, cotton, and rice. Sericulture is also practiced widely with the block producing 45,632 kg (100,601 lb) of silk cocoons in 2014-15. Other industries in the block include manufacture of bricks and PVC pipes. According to a 2017 report by the Tamil Nadu Pollution Control Board, the block is classified as "critical" in terms of availability of water resources due to over exploitation of ground water.

== Transport ==
Mallasamudram is situated on the Salem–Tiruchengode road, approximately 28 km (17 mi) from Salem and 50 km (31 mi) from Namakkal. Public bus services connect the town panchayat with the nearby towns of Erode, Namakkal, Salem, and Tiruchengode. The nearest railway station is Salem Junction railway station, located approximately 35 km (22 mi) from the town panchayat.
