= Valliyoor block =

C.d. block in Tirunelveli district, in Tamil Nadu state, India

Valliyoor block is a revenue block in the Tirunelveli district of Tamil Nadu, India. It has a total of 18 panchayat villages.
