= Alathur block, Perambalur =

Revenue block in Perambalur, Tamil Nadu, India

Alathur block is a revenue block in the Perambalur district of Tamil Nadu, India. It has a total of 39 panchayat villages.
