= Anakkavur =

Anakkavur அனக்காவூர்
- Town
- Location in Tamil Nadu, India
- Coordinates: 12.78°N 79.31°E
- Country: India
- State: Tamil Nadu
- District: Tiruvannamalai

Government
  - Type: Panchayat town
  - Body: Anakkavur ward council
- Elevation: 148 m (486 ft)

Population (2011)
  - Total: 9,675

Languages
  - Official: Tamil
- Time zone: UTC+5:30 (IST)
- PIN: 604401
- Telephone code: 044
- Vehicle registration: TN-25Z

Anakkavur is an administrative division in the Tiruvannamalai District of Tamil Nadu State, India. Headquartered in Anakkavoor town, the official language spoken in Anakkavoor is Tamil.
