= Thoockanaickenpalaiyam block =

Thoockanaickenpalaiyam block is a revenue block in the Erode district of Tamil Nadu, India. It has a total of 10 panchayat villages.
