= Kadaladi block =

Kadaladi block is a revenue block in the Ramanathapuram district of Tamil Nadu, India. It has a total of 60 panchayat villages.
