= Vandavasi block =

Vandavasi block is a revenue block in the Tiruvannamalai district of Tamil Nadu, India. It has a total of 61 panchayat villages.
