= Vedasandur block =

Coordinates: 10°31′49″N 77°55′22″E

Vedasandur block is a revenue block in the Dindigul district of Tamil Nadu, India. It has a total of 23 pancreatic villages.
