= Vedaranyam block =

Coordinates: 10°22′31″N 79°51′1″E

Vedaranyam block is a revenue block in Nagapattinam district, Tamil Nadu, India. There are a total of 36 panchayat villages in this block.
