= Cumbum block =

Revenue block in Tamil Nadu, India

Cumbum block is a revenue block in the Theni district of Tamil Nadu, India. It has a total of 5 panchayat villages.
