= Thirumangalam block =

Thirumangalam block is a revenue block in the Madurai district of Tamil Nadu, India. It has a total of 38 panchayat villages.
