= Cheranmahadevi block =

Revenue block in Tamil Nadu, India

Cheranmahadevi block is a revenue block in the Tirunelveli district of Tamil Nadu, India. It has a total of 12 panchayat villages.
