= Chengam block =

Revenue block in Tamil Nadu, India

Chengam block is a revenue block in the Tiruvannamalai district of Tamil Nadu, India. It has a total of 44 panchayat villages.
