= Kabilamalai block =

Coordinates: 11°08′39″N 77°48′29″E

Kabilamalai block is a revenue block in the Namakkal district of Tamil Nadu, India. It has a total of 20 panchayat villages.
