= Palayamkottai block =

Revenue block in Tirunelveli, Tamil Nadu, India

Palayamkottai block is a revenue block in the Tirunelveli district of Tamil Nadu, India. It has a total of 30 panchayat.

== Panchayats in Palayamkottai Panchayat Union ==
- Ariyakulam
- Itteri
- Keelanatham
- Kansapuram
- Konganthanparai
- Keelapattam
- Kunnathoor
- Melaputhaneri
- Maruthur
- Manappadaiveedu
- Muthur
- Melathidiyoor
- Munnirpallam
- Melapattam
- Naduvakurichi
- Ponnakudy
- Palayamchettikulam
- Pudukulam
- Rajavallipuram
- Ramayanpatti
- Rediyarpatti
- Seevalaperi
- Sivanthipatti
- Nochikulam
- Sengulam
- Tharuvai
- Thiruvenkatanatha puram
- Thidiyoor
- Thirumalaikolundu puram
- Udaiyarkulam
