= Perambalur block =

Revenue block of Tamil Nadu, India

Perambalur block is a revenue block in the Perambalur district of Tamil Nadu, India. It has a total of 20 panchayat villages.
