= Anthiyur block =

Block in the Erode district in India

Andiyur block is a revenue block in the Erode district of Tamil Nadu, India. It has a total of 14 panchayat villages.
