= Perundurai block =

Perundurai block is a revenue block in the Erode district of Tamil Nadu, India. It has a total of 29 panchayat villages.
