= Tattayyangarpettai block =

Indian revenue block

The Tattayyangarpettai block is a revenue block in the Tiruchirappalli district of Tamil Nadu, India. It has a total of 25 panchayat villages.
