= Tiruvadanai block =

Tiruvadanai block is a revenue block in the Ramanathapuram district of Tamil Nadu, India. It has a total of 37 panchayat villages.
