= Parangipettai block =

Revenue block of Cuddalore district of the Indian state of Tamil Nadu

Parangipettai block is a revenue block of Cuddalore district of the Indian state of Tamil Nadu. This revenue block consist of 41 panchayat villages. The Regional Development Office of this municipal union is functioning at Parangipettai.

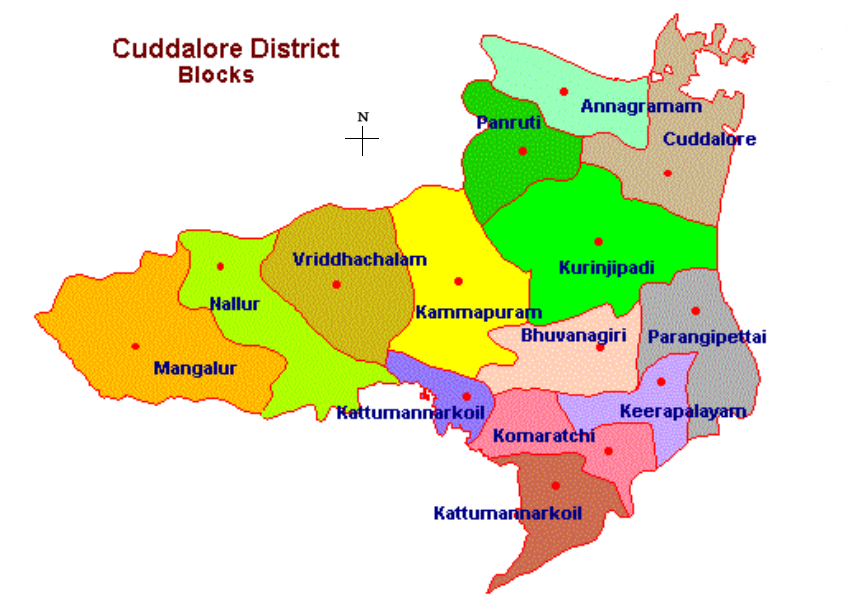
Revenue Blocks - Cuddalore District

== Classification of people ==
According to the 2011 Census of India, the total population of Parangipettai Panchayat Union is 1,10,073. The number of Scheduled Caste population is 33,939. The number of Scheduled Tribes is 1,030.

== List of Panchayat Villages ==
SI.No	Panchayat Village
1	Adivaraganallur
2	Ariakoshti
3	Arunmozhidevan
4	Ayeepuram
5	B.Maduvangarai
6	B.Mutlur
7	C.Kothankudi
8	Chinnakomatti
9	Chinnur Pudupettai
10	Kanagarapattu
11	Kavarapattu
12	Keel Anuvampattu
13	Keelamanakudi
14	Keelaperambai
15	Keelathirukalipalai
16	Kothattai
17	Kovilampoondi
18	Kumaramangalam
19	Kuriyamangalam
20	Manikollai
21	Manjakuzhi
22	Meethikudi
23	Melathirukalipalai
24	Nakkaravandankudi
25	Nanjamahathuvalgai
26	Pallipadai
27	Periyakomatti
28	Periyapattu
29	Pichavaram
30	Pinnathur
31	poovalai .chidamabaram
32	Senthirakillai
33	Silambimangalam
34	Thandavarayasozhanpet
35	Thatchakadu
36	Thillaividangan
37	Uthamasozhamangalam
38	Vasaputhur
39	Vayalamoor
40	Velangipattu
41	Villiyanallur
