= Thiagadurgam block =

The Thiagadurgam block is a revenue block in the Kallakurichi district of Tamil Nadu, India. It has a total of 40 panchayat villages.
