= Myladumparai block =

Revenue block in India

Myladumparai block is a revenue block in the Theni district of Tamil Nadu, India. It has a total of 18 panchayat villages.
