= Kottampatti block =

Town in Tamil Nadu, India

Kottampatti is a Panchayat Town in Madurai, which is district border in North direction on Nation Highway. It's Connecting 5 District Like Madurai Thiruchulapalli Dindigul Sivaganga Pudukkottai.Kottampatti is also one of revenue block in the Madurai district of Tamil Nadu, India. It has a total of 27 panchayat villages (including 247 villages).
