= Thuraiyur block =

Revenue block in the Tiruchirappalli district of Tamil Nadu, India

Thurayur block is a revenue block in the Tiruchirappalli district of Tamil Nadu, India. It has a total of 34 panchayat villages.
