= Chinnamanur block =

Revenue block in Tamil Nadu, India

Chinnamanur block is a revenue block in the Theni district of Tamil Nadu, India. It has a total of 14 panchayat villages.
