= C.Melavanniyur =

C.Melavanniyur is a village located in Chidambaram taluk, Cuddalore district, Tamil Nadu, India. Its PIN code is 608602. It is under the Keerappalayam panchayat. It is a small village with approximately 1500 people, about 6 km from Chidambaram. Paddy (nellu), ulundu and pasi dal (payir) are produced from this village. This village depends on rain, and veeranam water supply for agriculture. This village has a Government High School, Palvadi (Tamil: பால்வாடி) and Mahamariaman Temple. There are different communities of people living in this village.

Post office: Ennanagaram.

Major markets nearby: Bhuvanagiri and Chidambaram.

Member of the Legislative Assembly: Bhuvanagiri.

Lok Sabha constituency (MP): Chidambaram
