= Aruppukkottai block =

Revenue block

Coordinates: 9.51°N 78.1°E

Aruppukkottai block is a revenue block in the Virudhunagar district of Tamil Nadu, India. It has a total of 32 panchayat villages.
