= Mailam block =

Coordinates: 12.127°N 79.619°E

The Mailam block is a revenue block in the Viluppuram district of Tamil Nadu, India. It has a total of 47 panchayat villages.
