= Kothattai =

Neighbourhood in Cuddalore district, Tamil Nadu, India

- Neighbourhood
- Kothattai, Cuddalore, Tamil Nadu
- Coordinates: 11.5205°N 79.7456°E
- Country: India
- State: Tamil Nadu
- District: Cuddalore
- Elevation: 22.1 m (73 ft)

Population (2011)
  - Total: 1,468

Languages
  - Official: Tamil, English
  - Speech: Tamil, English
- Time zone: UTC+5:30 (IST)
- PIN: 608501
- Telephone code: 914144******
- Other Neighbourhoods: Parangipettai, Chinnakomatti, Periyakomatti, Manikollai, Manjakuzhi
- LS: Cuddalore
- VS: Tittakudi

Kothattai is a neighbourhood in Parangipettai block in Cuddalore district of Tamil Nadu state in India.

== Location ==
Kothattai is located with the geographic coordinates of (11.5205°N 79.7456°E) near Parangipettai.

Kothattai (Tamil Nadu)

== Population ==
As per 2011 census of India, Kothattai village had a population of 1,468 persons, out of which 741 persons were males and 727 persons were females.

== Tollbooth ==
A tollbooth was opened on 23 December 2024 at Kothattai. Private fleet owners staged protests against the toll fee collections mentioning no completion of works at the tollgate.
