= Vilathikulam block =

Coordinates: 9.17°N 78.17°E

Vilathikulam block is a revenue block in the Thoothukudi district of Tamil Nadu, India. It has a total of 51 panchayat villages.
