= Pappireddipatti block =

Pappireddipatti block is a revenue block in the Dharmapuri district of Tamil Nadu, India. It has a total of 19 panchayat villages.
