= Tiruvannamalai block =

Revenue block in India

Tiruvannamalai block is a revenue block in the Tiruvannamalai district of Tamil Nadu, India. It has a total of 69 panchayat villages.
