= Kadavur block =

Revenue block in India

Kadavur block is a revenue block in the Karur district of the Indian state of Tamil Nadu. It has 20 panchayat villages.
