= Namakkal block =

Coordinates: 11°14′N 78°10′E

Namakkal block is a revenue block in the Namakkal district of Tamil Nadu, India. It has a total of 34 panchayat villages.
