= Ottapidaram block =

Revenue block in India

Coordinates: 8.9178881°N 78.0227137°E

Ottapidaram block is a revenue block in the Thoothukudi district of Tamil Nadu, India. It has a total of 61 panchayat villages.
