= Kunandarkoil block =

Kunandarkoil block is a revenue block in Pudukkottai district, Tamil Nadu, India. It has a total of 37 panchayat villages.

== Villages of Kunandarkoil Block ==
1. Andakulam
2. Chettipatti
3. Kannagudi
4. Killanur
5. Killukottai
6. Killukulavaipatti
7. Koppampatti
8. Kulathur, Kunandarkoil, Pudukkottai
9. Lekkanapatti
10. Mangathevanpatti
11. Melapuduvayal
12. Minnathur
13. Mootampatti
14. Nanjur
15. Odugampatti
16. Odukoor
17. Pallathupatti
18. Papudaiyanpatti
19. Perambur, Pudukkottai
20. Periyathambiudaiyanpatti
21. Puliyur, Pudukkottai
22. Rakkathampatti
23. Senaiyakudi
24. Sengalur
25. T.keelaiyur
26. Thayinipatti
27. Themmavur
28. Thennangudi
29. Udayalipatti
30. Uppiliyakudi
31. Vaithur
32. Valamangalam
33. Valiyampatti
34. Vathanakottai
35. Vathanakuruchi
36. Veerakkudi
37. Visalur, Pudukkottai
