= Mallasamudram block =

Mallasamudram block is a revenue block in the Namakkal district of Tamil Nadu, India. It has a total of 27 panchayat villages.

Mallasamudram town is the headquarter of the block.
