= Vallam block =

Viluppuram district revenue block in Tamil Nadu, India

Coordinates: 12°14′39″N 79°30′24″E

The Vallam block is a revenue block in the Viluppuram district of Tamil Nadu, India. It has a total of 66 panchayat villages.
