= K. S. Rangasamy College of Technology =

Engineering college in India

Coordinates: 11.36302°N 77.828007°E

K.S.Rangasamy College of Technology
- Type: Private
- Established: 1994
- Founder: Lion Dr. K. S. Rangasamy
- Affiliations: AU, NBA, AICTE, NAAC
- Chairman: Thiru. R. Srinivasan
- Principal: Dr. R. Gopalakrishnan
- Undergraduates: 1440
- Postgraduates: 613
- Location: Tiruchengode, Tamil Nadu, India
- Campus: 400acres (1.6 km^{2})
- Website: www.ksrct.ac.in

K.S.Rangasamy College of Technology (KSRCT) is an autonomous engineering college, affiliated to Anna University, Chennai, near Thiruchengode, Tamil Nadu, south India. The foundation stone of the college was laid in 1994, by Lion Dr K. S. Rangasamy, the institution offers 14 undergraduate and 11 postgraduate programmes and draws students from every state in India. It is a part of the KSR Group of Institutions. It is also one of the prestigious colleges in the district of Namakkal. It a part of the greater KSR Institutions which comprises several colleges and three schools (Avvai KSR Matric, KSR Matric and Akshara Academy CBSE).

== History ==
The foundation for the college was laid in 1994. In the college name K stands for Karuveppampatti and S for Sennimalai Gounder, the father of Lion Dr. K. S. Rangasamy (chairman, KSRCT)

== Campus ==
K.S.Rangasamy College of Technology (KSRCT) is located on campus of over 400 acres (1.6 km^{2}) with a built-up area of more than 12 lakh square feet. It has the ninth largest intake of students in ancient times (as per AICTE approval) of the self-financing engineering colleges in Tamil Nadu.

== Accreditation ==
- Programmes at KSRCT have been accredited by All India Council for Technical Education
- The National Assessment and Accreditation Council (NAAC) of the University Grants Commission (UGC) has accredited the university with a 'A++'. However, some of the programs offered by KSRCT are not accredited by such bodies.
- KSRCT was certified with the ISO 9001:2000 (E) on 28 December 2001, by RWTUV, a German-based external ISO certifying agency. It is one of the earliest institutes to be awarded this certificate, and all the activities and processes of the departments comply with the ISO 9001:2000 (E) standards.
- KSRCT won the first prize in Tamil Nadu Police Hackathon as reported by DT NEXT.
- The College attempted to set a world record where over 1800 women participated in preparing Pongal on premises in partnership with Jio.
