= Polur block =

Polur block is a revenue block in the Tiruvannamalai district of Tamil Nadu, India. It has a total of 40 panchayat villages.
