= Rasipuram block =

Coordinates: 11.47°N 78.17°E

Rasipuram block is a revenue block in the Namakkal district of Tamil Nadu, India. It has a total of 20 panchayat villages.
