= Kamudi block =

Kamudi block is a revenue block in the Ramanathapuram district of Tamil Nadu, India. It has a total of 53 panchayat villages.
