= Tiruchengode block =

Thiruchengode block is a revenue block in the Namakkal district of Tamil Nadu, India. It has a total of 26 panchayat villages.
