= Nambiyur block =

Nambiyur block is a revenue block in the Erode district of Tamil Nadu, India. It has a total of 15 panchayat villages.
