= Alangayan block =

Muthu mariyaman kovil alayam

The Alangayam block is a revenue block in the Tirupathur district of Tamil Nadu, India. It has a total of 29 panchayat villages.
