= Narikudi block =

Narikudi block is a revenue block in the Virudhunagar district of the Indian state of Tamil Nadu. It hosts 44 panchayat villages. Its block number is 285.

== Demographics ==
The block has a total of 18.208 homes spread across 92 villages.

== Geography ==
It is situated about 32 km from Aruppukkottai. The residential areas are located in the hospital area, union office area, and by the bus stand. It falls under Thiruchuli tehsil.

== Economy ==
Due to a lack of business establishments, many residents commute to Aruppukkottai or Thiruppuvanam for work. The block has three revenue Firkas (subdivisions), namely Narikudi, A.Mukkulam, and Veeracholan.

Narikudi has one Nationalized Indian Overseas Bank and one Co-operative Bank.

The major cultivated crops are paddy and groundnut and are mostly cultivated in drylands with the help of rain from the northeast monsoon.

== Transport ==
One poorly-connected railway station is present offering a single passenger train from Virudhunagar to Karaikudi.
