= Idappadi block =

Idappadi block is a revenue block in the Salem district of Tamil Nadu, India. It has a total of 10 panchayat villages. They are:

1. Adaiyur
2. Avaniperur East
3. Chettimankurichi
4. Chithoor
5. Dhadhapuram
6. Iruppali
7. Nedungulam
8. Pakkanadu
9. Vellarivelli
10. Vembaneri
