= Palacode block =

Palacode block is a revenue block in the Dharmapuri district of Tamil Nadu, India. It has a total of 32 panchayat villages.
