= Kallakkurichi block =

Coordinates: 11.738°N 78.962°E

The Kallakurichi block is a revenue block in the Kallakurichi district of Tamil Nadu, India. It has a total of 46 panchayat villages.
