= Nattam block =

Nattam block is a revenue block in the Dindigul district of Tamil Nadu, India. It has a total of 23 panchayat villages.
