= Navalpakkam =

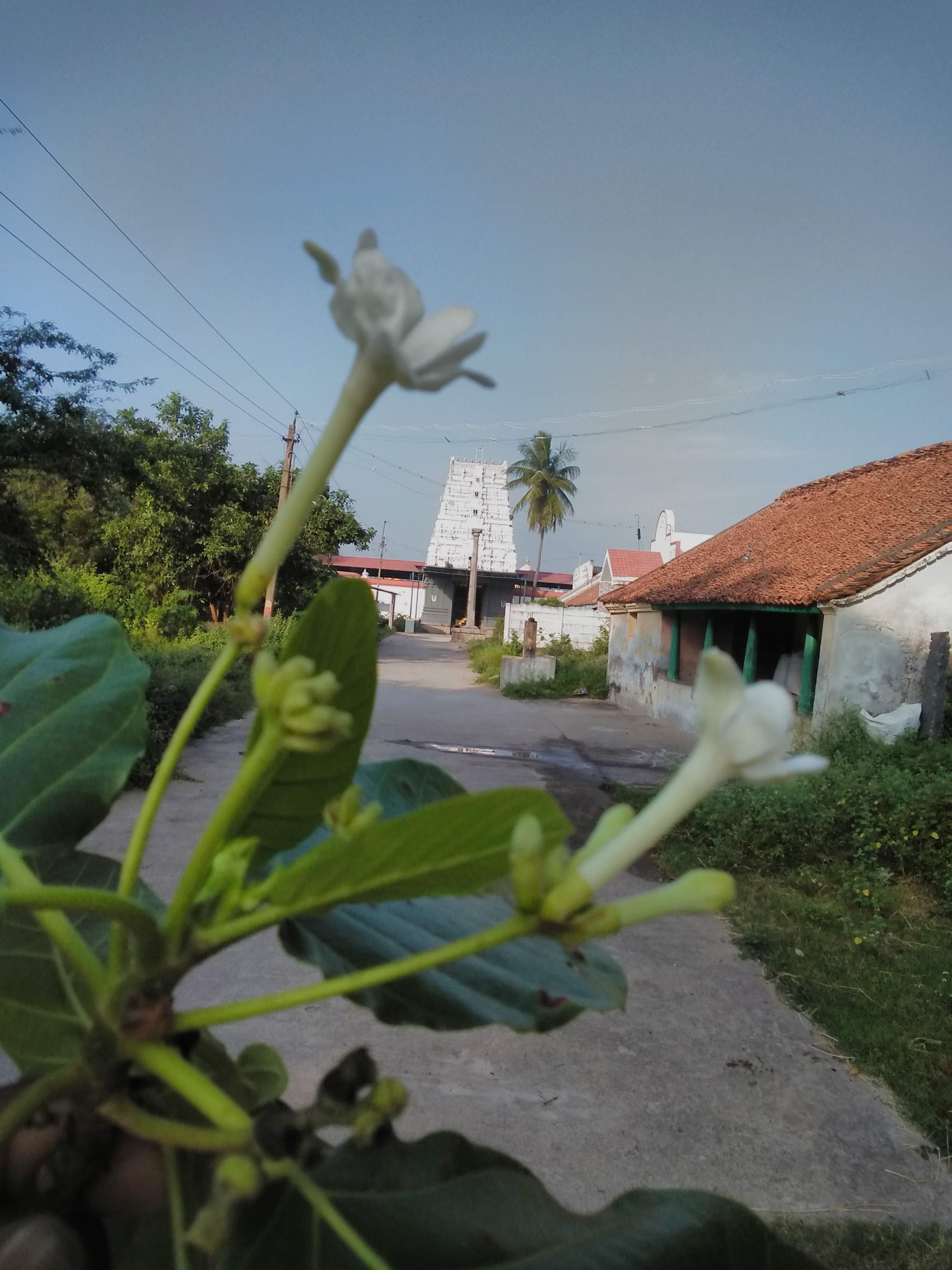
S.Navalpakkam
- Village
- Nickname: Jambupura Kshetram (Sanskrit)
- Country: India
- State: Tamil Nadu
- District: Tiruvannamalai
- Developed By: Ayya Kumara Thathadesikan
- Scholars of the village: Annayariya Mahadesikan Sowmmayaji Narayanachariyar. Ayya Devanatha Maha desikan Varadhachariyar Valayapettai Ramanujachariyar N.S Ramanujachariyar Vasudevachariyar

Navalpakkam is a small village located in the Vandavasi taluk in the Tiruvannamalai district of Tamil Nadu. It is also known as S.Navalpakkam, where 'S' stands for 'Shotriam'. Its postal PIN code is 604411.

Navlpakkkam is also known as Jambupura Kshetram in Sanskrit, where Jambu means the Blackberry Tree and Kshetram means Place. This is because there are many Blackberry Trees in Navalpakkam.

Navalpakkam is famous for its Srinivasa Perumal temple established by Srinivaasachariyar and subsequently developed by his son Ayya Kumara Thathadesikan. This Srinivasa Perumal Temple is being managed for generations by the Neelamegathathachariyars. Neelamegathathachariyar was the first son of Ayya kumara thathadesikan.

The village has been known for Sanskrit scholars and Veda Pandits. The festivals (Utsavams) of the Srinivas Perumal temple are celebrated in great manner, and the annual "Bramhotsavam" (festival) for the Lord Srinivasa is widely celebrated.
