= Thellar block =

Thellar block is a revenue block in the Tiruvannamalai district of Tamil Nadu, India. It has a total of 61 panchayat villages.
