= Kolathur block =

Coordinates: 11.51°N 77.45°E

Kolathur block is a revenue block of Salem district of the Indian state of Tamil Nadu. This revenue block consist of 14 panchayat villages. They are,

1. Alamarathupatti
2. Chithiraipattipudur
3. Dhinnapatti
4. Kannamoochi
5. Karungallur
6. Kaveripuram
7. Kolnaickenpatti
8. Lakkampatti
9. Moolakkadu
10. Navapatti
11. Palamalai
12. Pannavadi
13. Sampalli
14. Singiripatti
