= Tiruchengode taluk =

Thiruchengode taluk is a taluk of Namakkal district of the Indian state of Tamil Nadu. The headquarters of the taluk is the town of Thiruchengode

== Demographics ==
According to the 2011 census, the taluk of Tiruchengode had a population of 631,093 with 316,389 males and 314,704 females. There were 995 women for every 1000 men. The taluk had a literacy rate of 68.88. Child population in the age group below 6 was 26,488 Males and 24,861 Females.

== Villages ==
- Erayamangalam
- Elachipalayam
- Kattuvelampalayam
- Paruthipalli
