= Cheyyar block =

Revenue block in Tamil Nadu, India

Cheyyar block is a revenue block in the Tiruvannamalai district of Tamil Nadu, India. It has a total of 53 panchayat villages.
