= Dharmapuri block =

C.d. block in Dharmapuri district, in Tamil Nadu state, India

Dharmapuri block is a revenue block in the Dharmapuri district of Tamil Nadu, India. It has a total of 28 panchayat villages.
