= Sendamangalam block =

Block in Tamil Nadu, India

Sendamangalam block is a revenue block in the Namakkal district of Tamil Nadu, India. It has a total of 14 panchayat villages.

It is part of the Senthamangalam (state assembly constituency).
