= Omalur block =

Revenue block in India

Omalur block is a revenue block in the Salem district of Tamil Nadu, India. It has a total of 33 panchayat villages.
