= Nanguneri block =

Nanguneri Block is a revenue block in the Tirunelveli district of Tamil Nadu, India with a total of 27 panchayat villages.

The Nanguneri Taluk (township) was selected for the proposal of Nanguneri Special Zone. After the inauguration, INFAC was selected to create friendly industry infrastructure for the plan of the Special Economic Zone. After the withdrawal of INFAC, TIDCO & AMRL Hitech City Ltd. signed the agreement of the provision of over 2500 acres of land in the region to promote a Multi Product Special Economic zone. They plan to streamline multiple manufacturing units of different sectors. Some include certain major industrial areas like pharmaceutical industry, Industrial products, IT, automobile, chemical etc. Within ten years, Nanguneri is envisioned to be an important place that will be marked on the international industrial city map.

On April 29, 2023, the Tamil Nadu Government has terminated the contract between TIDCO & AMRL Hitech City on the 2500 acres of Nanguneri Block.
