= Sankarapuram block =

The Sankarapuram is a revenue block in the Kallakurichi district of Tamil Nadu, India. It has a total of 44 panchayat villages.
