= Rajapalayam block =

Coordinates: 9°27′0″N 77°33′0″E

Rajapalayam block is a revenue block in the Virudhunagar district of Tamil Nadu, India. It has a total of 36 panchayat villages.
