= Tirupattur (disambiguation) =

Tirupattur is the headquarters of Tirupathur district in Tamil Nadu, India.

Tirupattur or Tirupathur (and other transliterations) is a common place-name in Tamil Nadu, India, and may also refer to:

== Sivaganga district ==
- Tiruppattur, Sivaganga, a panchayat town in Sivaganga district
- Tiruppattur block, a revenue block in Sivaganga district
- Tiruppattur, Sivaganga Assembly constituency, state assembly 194 in Sivaganga district

== Tirupattur district ==
- Tirupattur block, a revenue block in Tirupattur district
- Tirupattur district, a district carved out from Vellore district in 2019
- Tirupattur division, a revenue division in Tirupattur district
- Tirupattur taluk, a taluk in Tirupattur district
- Tiruppattur, Vellore Assembly constituency
- Tiruppattur railway station, a station serving the town

== Other districts ==
- Tirupattur Lok Sabha constituency, a defunct Lok Sabha constituency
- Thiruppattur, Tiruchirappalli, a village in Tiruchirappalli district

== See also ==
- Pathur (disambiguation)
