= Paiyampalli =

Coordinates: 12°30′N 78°36′E

Paiyampalli is a village in Tirupattur taluk of Tirupattur district in Tamil Nadu, India. It is located 5 km east of Barugur and 8 km west of Natrampalli. It is known for the excavation site in the region which has remains of Neolithic and Megalithic periods. The excavations in the region carried out by the Archaeological Survey of India headed by Shikaripura Ranganatha Rao in the year 1964–65 and 1967–68.
