= Kavalur =

- village
- Location in Tamil Nadu, India Kavalur (India)
- Coordinates: 12°34′40.872″N 78°48′47.448″E
- Country: India
- State: Tamil Nadu
- District: Tirupathur

Population (2001)
  - Total: 1,010

Languages
  - Official: Tamil
- Time zone: UTC+5:30 (IST)
- PIN: 635701
- Telephone code: 04174
- Vehicle registration: TN-83

Kavalur is a village in the Jawadhu Hills in Vaniyambadi taluk, Tirupathur district, Tamil Nadu, India. The village hosts the Vainu Bappu Observatory (VBO), which was established in the 1970s, and contains the 1-meter (3 ft 3 in) Carl Zeiss Telescope, and the 2.3-meter (7 ft 7 in) Vainu Bappu telescope.

== Demographics ==
As of 2001 census, Kavalur had a total population of 1010 with 496 males and 514 females. The sex ratio was 1036. The literacy rate was 48.45.

== See also ==
- Vainu Bappu Observatory
- Vellore
- Vainu Bappu
- Jawadhu Hills
