= Kandili block =

Kandili
- Country: India
- State: Tamil Nadu
- District: Tirupattur district
- Region: Vellore

Languages
  - Official: Tamil
- Time zone: UTC+5:30 (IST)
- PIN: 635901
- Vehicle registration: TN-83, TN-23

The Kandili is a revenue block in the Tirupattur district of Tamil Nadu, India. It has a total of 39 panchayat villages.

It is located about 12 km (7.5 mi) from Tirupattur, 34 km (21 mi) from krishnagiri ,84 km (52 mi) from Hosur,56 km (35 mi) from Dharmapuri,

Kandili Block Head Quarters is Kandili town .

Tirupathur City, Vaniyambadi City, Dharmapuri City, Krishnagiri City are the nearby Cities to Kandili.

It is in the 387 m elevation(altitude) .

Yelagiri ( Yelagiri Hills), Thiruvannamalai, Yercaud, Vellore, Hogenakkal Falls (Hogenakal) are the near by Important tourist destinations to see.

Thiruvenkadam is the main member in kandhili block

Tamil is the Local Language here. Also People Speaks Telugu and Urdu.

Politics in Kandili Block DMK, AIADMK ,நாம் தமிழர் கட்சி, PMK are the major political parties in this area.
