= Vaniyambadi Revenue district =

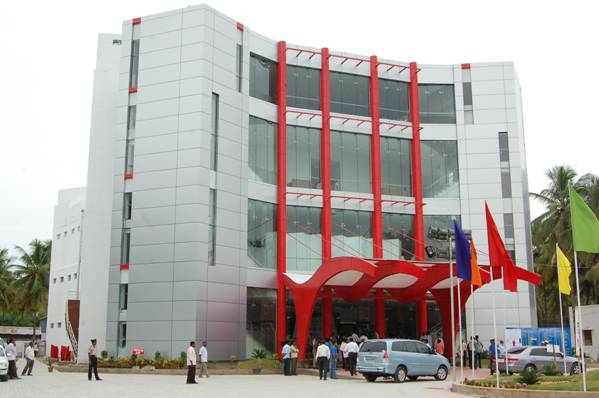
View of Ambur Trade Centre

Vaniyambadi Revenue District in the southern state of Tamil Nadu is one of the major leather export hubs in India. The district comprises two towns viz. Vaniyambadi and Ambur.

In November 2019, Tamil Nadu was reconfigured as 37 districts. Vellore district was divided into three, including Tirupattur district. Two revenue districts were created in Tiripattur district, one of which is Vaniyambadi revenue district.

== See also ==
- Vaniyambadi, Town in Tamil Nadu, India
- Vaniya
- Vaniyappara, Place in Kerala, India
