= Jolarpettai =

Town in Tirupattur District, India

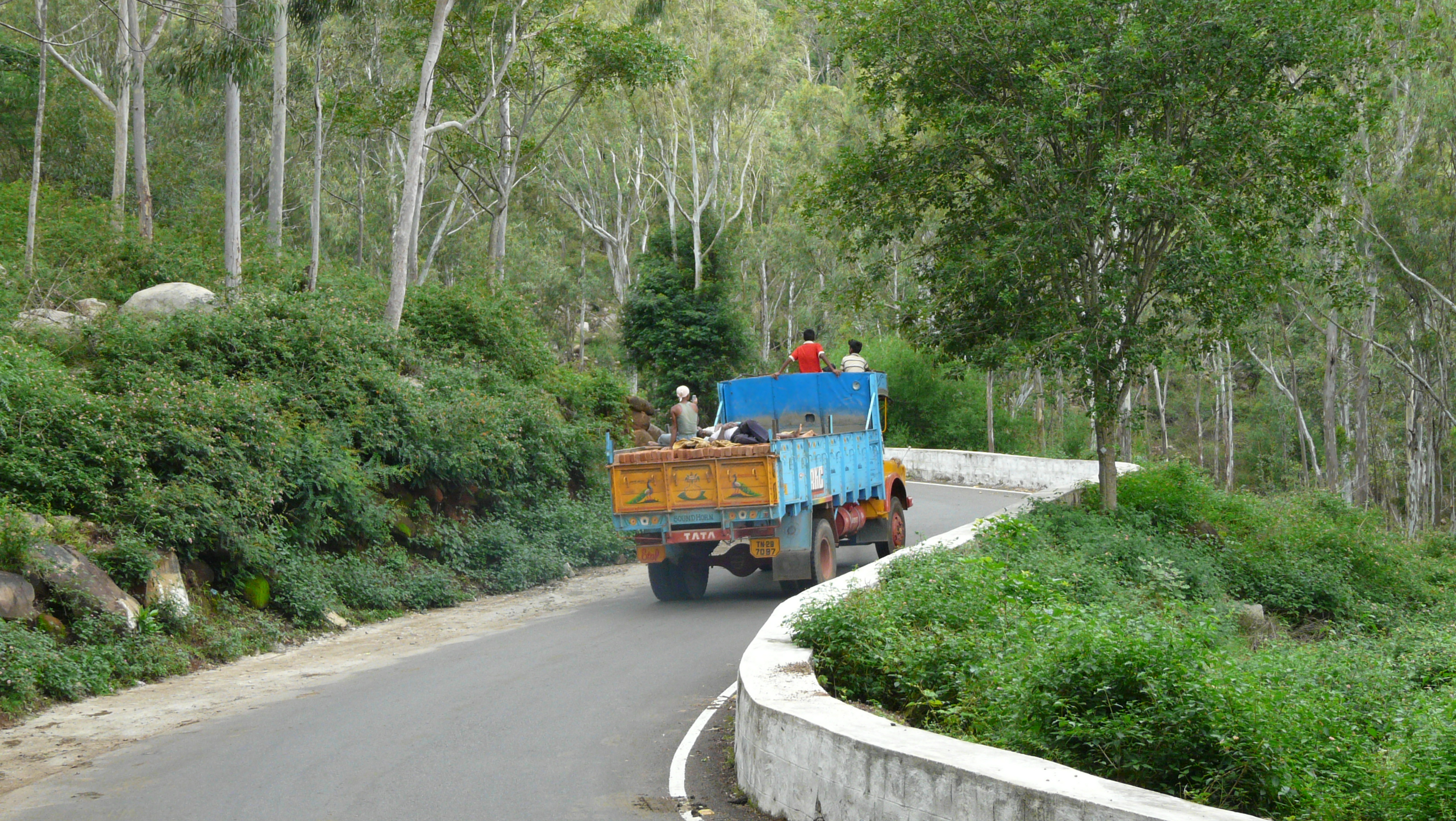
Jolarpettai Yelagiri road

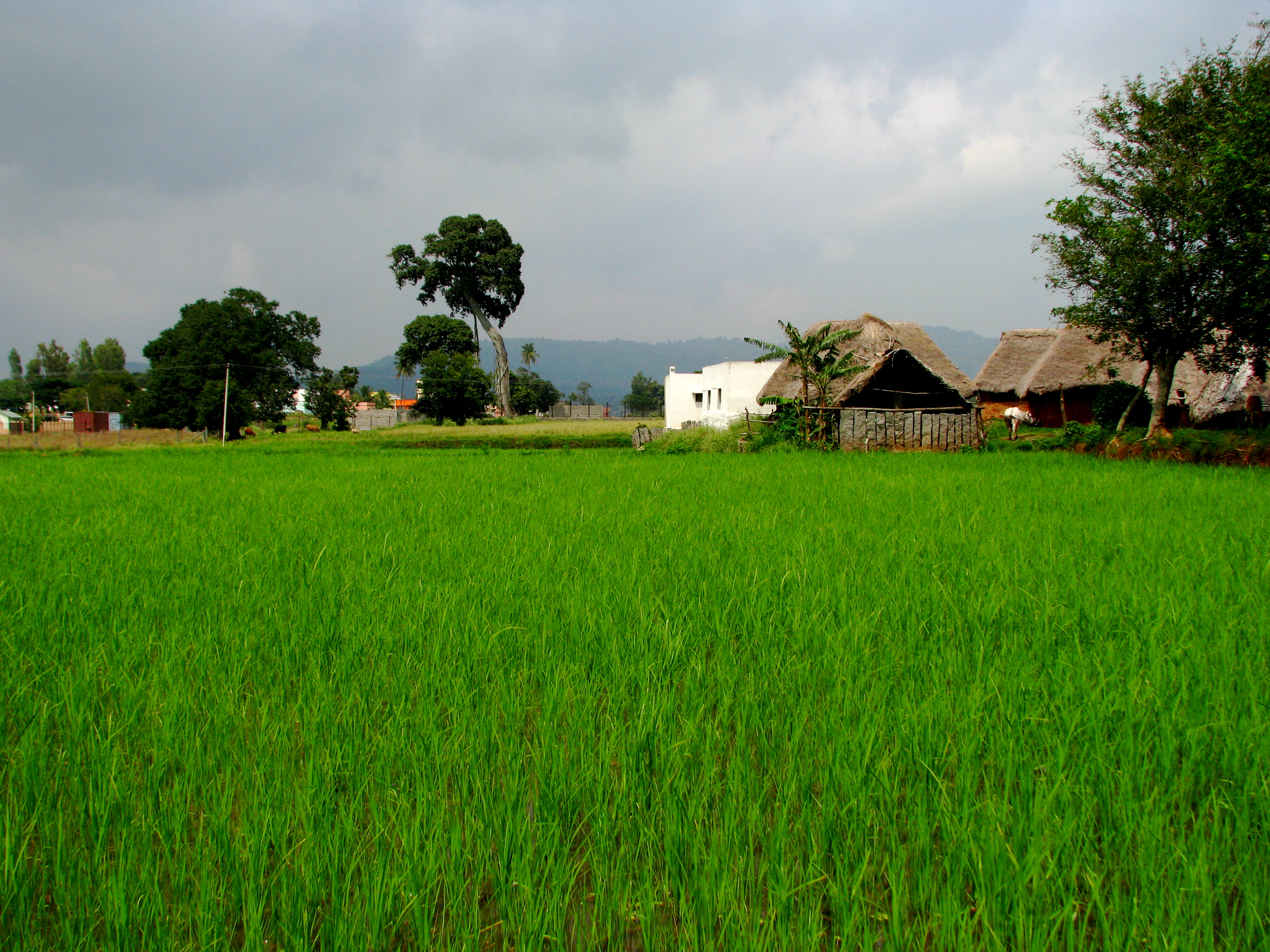
Yelagiri Hills, Jolarpettai

Jolarpettai is a Town in Tirupattur district, Tamil Nadu, India. It is a commuter rail hub in Southern Railway, which is one of the largest Railway Junction in Tamil Nadu. It is 7 km from district headquarter Tirupattur and 18 km from Vaniyambadi.

As of 2011, the municipal town had a population of 29,662 and covered an area of 13.06 km^{2}. The town is divided into 18 wards.

== History ==
Jolarpet Municipality was constituted in 1971 from 23.5.1971 as First Grade Town Panchayat Selection Grade Town Panchayat 1982 from 24.02 1982 and then it was upgraded to Third Grade Municipality from 01.07 2004 and it was subsequently upgraded as IInd Grade Municipality Vide GO(Ms) No. 154 Dt. 09.08 2010.

== Geography ==
Jolarpet is a second grade municipality in Tirupattur district.
Jolarpet is renowned for its railway station. The town is also located on State Highway 18 connecting Vaniyambadi -Tirupattur. Regarding transportation linkage, the highway (NH 48) from Chennai to Krishnagiri passes through the outskirts of the town. Jolarpettai municipality comprises four revenue villages, namely, Vakkanampatti, Ediyampatti Ossinattam Vattam, Kudiyana Kuppam, and spreads over an area of 13.06 km^{2}. Location of Yelagiri hills close with the town supports growth of the town to a greater extent. Almost the whole of Jolarpet Municipality consists of flat terrain. The general slope is towards southeast and the small streams that rise in the Yelagiri hills situated in the west eventually fall into the Palar river. The topography of Jolarpet in plain and it is situated at an altitude of 186.75 meters above mean sea level. The wind direction is predominant towards southwest for the whole of the year However, during summer it is from southwest to northeast.

=== Climate and rainfall ===
The seasonal climate conditions are moderate. Weather is colder during winter and hotter in summer due to hills and forests surrounding the town.

The average maximum and minimum temperature are 42 °C and 13 °C respectively. The town typically receives a maximum rainfall of 35 cm, 37 cm during the September, October and November. Light moderate rainfall of 10 cm to 32 cm occurs during the months of June, July & August.

The wind direction during April to September is southwest. September is usually a still cold month, with light and varying winds by October the winds shifts to northeast succeeded by north-east monsoon and winter season begins. The south-west wind begins to carry on the southwest monsoon with occasional showers up to August.

== Demographics ==
Religious census
Religion	Percent(%)
Hindu	91.87%
Muslim	4.44%
Christian	3.55%
Sikh	0.02%
Buddhist	0.02%
Jain	0.0%
Other	0.09%
No religion	0.01%

According to 2011 census, Jolarpet had a population of 29,662 with a sex-ratio of 1,032 females for every 1,000 males, much above the national average of 929. A total of 3,148 were under the age of six, constituting 1,605 males and 1,543 females. Scheduled Castes and Scheduled Tribes accounted for 17.89% and 1.79% of the population respectively. The average literacy of the town was 74.44%, compared to the national average of 72.99%. The town had a total of : 7140 households. There were a total of 10,639 workers, comprising 220 cultivators, 632 main agricultural labourers, 1,211 in house hold industries, 6,327 other workers, 2,249 marginal workers, 20 marginal cultivators, 274 marginal agricultural labourers, 269 marginal workers in household industries and 1,686 other marginal workers. As per the religious census of 2011, Jolarpet had 91.87% Hindus, 4.44% Muslims, 3.55% Christians, 0.02% Sikhs, 0.02% Buddhists, 0.0% Jains, 0.09% following other religions and 0.01% following no religion or did not indicate any religious preference.

== Administration and politics ==
Jolarpet Assembly constituency is the 49th Tamil Assembly constituency and covers this area.

The Municipal Council comprises 18 wards. Councillors are headed by chairperson, who is elected by voters of the councillors. The municipal office is situated at Gandhi Road near by Jolarpet Railway junction.

== Transport ==
Jolarpettai is well connected by road to various parts of Tirupattur and Vellore districts. The State Highway 18 (Salem-Vaniyambadi) passes through the town, while NH 48 (Krishnagiri-Walajapet), which is part of the Golden Quadrilateral project, passes through the town's outskirts. It is well connected to all parts of Tirupattur and Vellore district as well as important towns in Krishnagiri district and Dharmapuri district and Bengaluru by buses.

Jolarpet Junction is a major cause of the town's development. The presence of a State Highway adds an advantage to the town. Thus, the town takes in the advantage of both road and rail.

There is no airport in Jolarpet but the nearest airport is Kempegowda International Airport in Bengaluru, which is 185 kilometres (115 mi) from the town.

== See also ==
- Jolarpet Junction Railway Station
- RMHS EM JTJ
- Jolarpet (State Assembly Constituency)
