= Vaniyambadi =

Vaniyambadi Vaniampadi
- Town
- Vaniyambadi
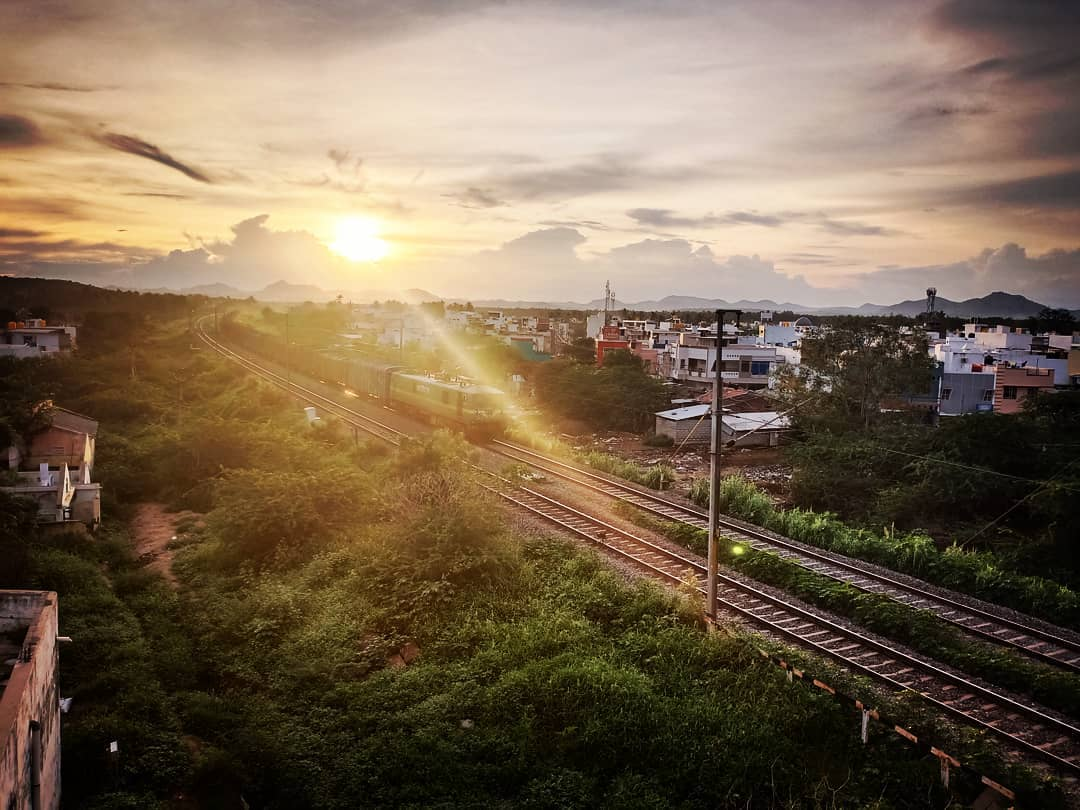
- View of Vaniyambadi town from Railroad station
- Nicknames: Biryani Palace, Leather Hub
- Vaniyambadi, Tamil Nadu
- Coordinates: 12.682500°N 78.616700°E
- Country: India
- State: Tamil Nadu
- Region: Tondai Nadu
- Division: Vellore
- Legislative Assembly Constituency: Vaniyambadi
- Lok Sabha Constituency: Vellore
- Administrative District: Tirupathur
- First formed: August 21, 1885
- Named for: Goddess Saraswati (Vaani)

Government
  - Type: Municipality (Selection Grade)
  - Body: Vaniyambadi Municipality

Area
  - Total: 9.54 km^{2} (3.68 sq mi)
- Elevation: 371 m (1,217 ft)

Population (2011)
  - Total: 95,061
  - Density: 9,964/km^{2} (25,810/sq mi)
- Demonym: Vaniyambadian

Languages
  - Official Language: Tamil
- Time zone: UTC+5:30 (IST)
- PIN: 63575x
- Telephone code: +91-4174
- Vehicle registration: TN 83, TN 23
- Literacy Rate: 85.13%
- Sex ratio: 1023 ♂/♀
- Website: Vaniyambadi Municipality

Vaniyambadi (shortly known as VNB or VN) (Tamil: வாணியம்பாடி) is a prominent industrial town in the Vellore region in the South Indian state of Tamil Nadu. It is recognised as one of India's major leather manufacturing and export hubs. Along with its twin town, Ambur (16 km to the East), the Vaniyambadi Revenue district accounts for a significant share of India's finished leather, leather garments, and footwear components shipped directly to international markets, including Europe and North America. It is located about 67 km east of Vellore, 146 km west of Bengaluru, and 200 km east of the state's capital, Chennai.

Historically, Vaniyambadi has remained a major town in the North Arcot district of the Madras Presidency (present-day Tamil Nadu). In 1989, the North Arcot district was bifurcated into Vellore and Tiruvannamalai districts, and Vaniyambadi remained part of the Vellore district. Later in 2019, the Vellore district was further trifurcated into Ranipet, Tirupathur, and Vellore districts, with Vaniyambadi becoming a part of Tirupathur district, thereby breaking the century-old administrative ties with Vellore.

The Vaniyambadi Municipality was formed by the G.O. MS. No. 421 Local & Municipality Department in April 1886. In 1996, this Municipality was upgraded to Grade II Municipality by G.O. MS. NO. 118 Rural Development Local Administration Department dated 01.05.1996. In 1998, this Municipality was upgraded to 1st Grade. There has been a long-standing request to upgrade the town to a municipal corporation.

It is one of the hubs of Leather exports in Tamil Nadu. It is also famous throughout India for its special Vaniyambadi Biryani. The city is the home for many prestigious century-old educational institutions viz. The Vaniyambadi Muslim Educational Society (VMES) (Estd. 1901), The Hindu Higher Secondary School (Estd. 1914). The famous hill station Yelagiri is approximately 20 km away from town. Another hill station leading way through Andhra Pradesh is a short way to Kolar Gold Fields and Karnataka.

== Etymology ==
Vaniyambadi in Tamil Nadu derives its name and identity from mythological lore. Vaniyambadi is derived from Vaniampadi = Vani Ammai + Padi (Tamil: வாணி அம்மை + பாடி) which denotes "Vani Ammai" the name of the Goddess Saraswathi, and "Padi" refers the infinitive, "to sing".

Legend has it that Lord Brahma cursed Goddess Saraswati (Vaani) to be mute. The relief for this curse is said to be praying to Lord Siva and offering food, for which she had performed rigorous penance and took a holy dip in the local Sheera (Palar) River. When Lord Siva appeared to restore her voice and accepted her food offering, Lord Vishnu also manifested at this exact spot to claim his share of the divine feast. This divine establishes why the ancient Athitheeswarar Temple and Sundara Varadaraja Perumal Temple sit directly opposite each other on the Palar riverbank.

== History ==
Indeed, magnificent temples were constructed for both Gods. Athitheeswarar temple, a 1200-year-old temple dedicated to Lord Siva, was constructed by the Pallavas and later patronised by the Chola kings including Rajaraja I. The temple underwent reforms by the Ganga Dynasty and the Vijayanagara Empire. Sundara Varadaraja Perumal temple, a historic temple dedicated to Lord Vishnu, was constructed around 985 CE by the Madhurantaka Chola and renovated extensively around 1545 CE by Sadasivaranjan, a minister of King Krishnadevaraya of the Vijayanagara Empire. These temples dot both banks of the fast-flowing Palar River.

Vaniyambadi, today, is surrounded by hills, farmlands, and water channels.

== Battle of Vaniyambadi (1767) ==
Vaniyambadi is a well-known place in the history of fights against the British. Hyder Ali and his son Tipu Sultan have been known to have camped in Vaniyambadi during their battles against the British empire, also Vaniyambadi battle is first for Tipu at the age of 17 when his Father was ill.

The Mysorean army set off on its fresh round of campaigning in the beginning of November 1767. According to De la Tour, it was two days after Haidar's mother had departed with her retinue. The main army marched towards Vaniyambadi while another detachment had been sent earlier in the direction of Tirupattur which had again fallen into British hands. The scouting parties of cavalry and infantry had reported an easy approach to Vaniyambadi along the course of the Palar river which flowed past the town and the route was covered with thick undergrowth and trees. Also there was no need of digging trenches for the artillery due to there being a ridge which could serve as a position for the cannons. The garrison there consisted of 30 Europeans with 1000 sepoys, mostly irregulars. The Mysorean army reached the outskirts of the fort at dusk on November 6 and set up a battery of 12 cannons on the ridge at night. The European commander of the artillery received a light wound in the process. Haidar ordered him to rest in his tent and took over the personal command of the battery. Throughout the night he sat under a tree nearby and directed the setting up of the artillery unmindful of the firing by the British who had now noticed his approach. Though this is not mentioned in other sources it is certainly characteristic of Haidar's courage and he would repeat it during the siege of Ambur. He left when the commander returned. The cannons commenced firing soon after dawn on November 7 and soon the British garrison in Vaniyambadi capitulated, probably due to its inadequate strength though no breach had been made.

== Geography ==
=== Location ===
Vaniyambadi is located at 12.6872° N, 78.6303° E. It has an average elevation of 354 metres (1,161 ft) and lies in the Eastern Ghats region and on the banks of the Palar river. Yelagiri and Javadi Hills are located to the south of the town. By road Vaniyambadi is surrounded by Ambur and Tirupathur which are 15 km, 24 km away respectively. It is on the banks of the Palar River.

=== Climate ===
Vaniyambadi experiences a tropical savanna climate (Köppen climate classification Aw). The temperature ranges from 10°C (50°F) to 40°C (104°F). In the city, March to May are the hottest months and November to January are the coldest. Vaniyambadi receives 865.3 mm (34.07 in) of rainfall every year. The southwestern monsoon from June to September brings 360.5 mm of rainfall, with September being the rainiest month. The north-eastern monsoon which lasts from October to December brings 294.7 mm of rainfall. The humidity ranges from 50% to 58% during summer and 61% to 80% during winter.

Climate data for Vaniyambadi – Rainfall (1971 to 2005) & Others (1990 to 2020)
Month	Jan	Feb	Mar	Apr	May	Jun	Jul	Aug	Sep	Oct	Nov	Dec	Year
Record high °C (°F)	34 (93)	38 (100)	39 (102)	40 (104)	40 (104)	37 (99)	36 (97)	35 (95)	34 (93)	34 (93)	34 (93)	32 (90)	40 (104)
Mean daily maximum °C (°F)	27 (81)	29 (84)	32 (90)	33 (91)	33 (91)	29 (84)	27 (81)	27 (81)	28 (82)	28 (82)	27 (81)	26 (79)	29 (84)
Mean daily minimum °C (°F)	16 (61)	18 (64)	20 (68)	22 (72)	24 (75)	22 (72)	22 (72)	21 (70)	21 (70)	21 (70)	19 (66)	17 (63)	20 (69)
Record low °C (°F)	10 (50)	11 (52)	11 (52)	14 (57)	20 (68)	18 (64)	18 (64)	18 (64)	16 (61)	14 (57)	11 (52)	11 (52)	10 (50)
Average rainfall mm (inches)	3.3 (0.13)	3.9 (0.15)	6.2 (0.24)	23.7 (0.93)	67.6 (2.66)	65.6 (2.58)	81.2 (3.20)	103.9 (4.09)	191.0 (7.52)	160.6 (6.32)	80.7 (3.18)	45.1 (1.78)	865.3 (34.07)
Average rainy days	1.3	1.1	1.8	3.9	14.8	20.7	20.8	21.5	20.7	16.7	8.5	4.1	135.9
Average relative humidity (%) (at 17:30 IST)	71	61	53	50	50	58	61	66	72	78	80	78	65
Source: Foreca, Metroblue, INFLIBNET

== Demographics ==
According to 2011 census, Vaniyambadi had a population of 95,061 with a sex-ratio of 1,023 females for every 1,000 males, much above the national average of 929. A total of 12,013 were under the age of six, constituting 6,121 males and 5,892 females. Scheduled Castes and Scheduled Tribes accounted for 15.15% and 0.09% of the population respectively. The average literacy of the town was 85.13%, compared to the national average of 72.99%. The town had a total of 40,559 households. There were a total of 61,013 workers, comprising 94 cultivators, 218 main agricultural labourers, 800 in house hold industries, 26,529 other workers, 3,372 marginal workers, 11 marginal cultivators, 100 marginal agricultural labourers, 202 marginal workers in household industries and 3,059 other marginal workers.

Religion in Vaniyambadi (2011)
Religion	Percent(%)
Muslim	55.74%
Hindu	41.75%
Christian	1.99%
Others	0.52%

Islam is the majority religion in the town, followed by Hinduism. There is a small Christian minority.

Tamil is the most spoken language with 71.1% of the population speaking the language. Urdu is spoken by 19.2% of the population, and Telugu by about 6% of the population. Leather tanning is a major industry of the town and leather garments, and making leather shoes are one of the economies of the town even today Vaniyambadi leathers have separate value in the global leather market. Agriculture, especially coconut plantations, is the other major source of livelihood.

Historical population
Year	Pop.	±%
1911	20,406	—
1921	20,090	−1.5%
1931	22,940	+14.2%
1941	31,281	+36.4%
1951	38,712	+23.8%
1961	42,048	+8.6%
1971	51,810	+23.2%
1981	59,107	+14.1%
1991	72,428	+22.5%
2001	85,752	+18.4%
2011	95,061	+10.9%
Source: Government of Tamil Nadu

== Administration and politics ==
Municipality (Selection Grade) Officials
Chairman	Vacant
Commissioner	Thiru.S.Bhuvaneswaran alias Annamalai
Deputy Chairman	Vacant
Member of Legislative Assembly
Vaniyambadi	Thiru. Syed Farooq Basha (IUML)
Member of Parliament
Vellore	Thiru. D. M. Kathir Anand (DMK)

The town consists of 36 Wards each with an elected Councillor. Legislative power is vested in the member council, headed by an elected chairperson and assisted by a deputy chairperson. The Municipal Commissioner governs the departments of the municipality. Law and order is maintained by the Tamil Nadu Police, headed by a Deputy superintendent.

Vaniyambadi is a part of the Vaniyambadi assembly constituency. The city elects its member to the Tamil Nadu Legislative Assembly once in every five years. The city is part of the Vellore Lok Sabha constituency consisting of six assembly constituencies: Vellore, Vaniyambadi, Ambur, Gudiyatham, Anaicut and Kilvaithinankuppam (SC).

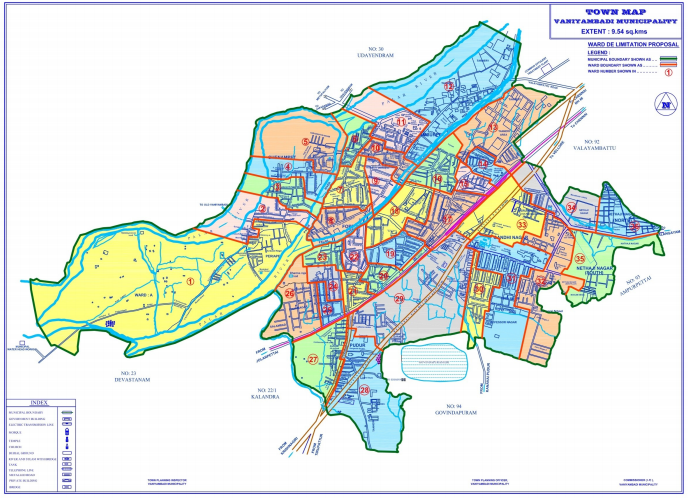
Map of Vaniyambadi

Since 1952, the Vaniyambadi Assembly seat was held by the ADMK four times (1980, 2002 (by-election), 2011 and 2016), by the DMK four times (1962, 1989, 1996 and 2006), by the Indian National Congress three times (1957, 1984 and 1991) and by independent candidates four times (1952, 1971, 1977 and 2001).

Since 1952, the Vellore parliament seat was held by the Indian National Congress five times (1952, 1957, 1962, 1977 and 1991), by the DMK four times (1962, 1971, 1996 and 2019), by the Indian Union Muslim League four times (1980, 1989, 2004 and 2009), by the ADMK two times (1984 and 2016) and by the PMK two times (1998 and 1999). The current Member of Parliament from the constituency is D. M. Kathir Anand from the DMK.

== Places of interest ==
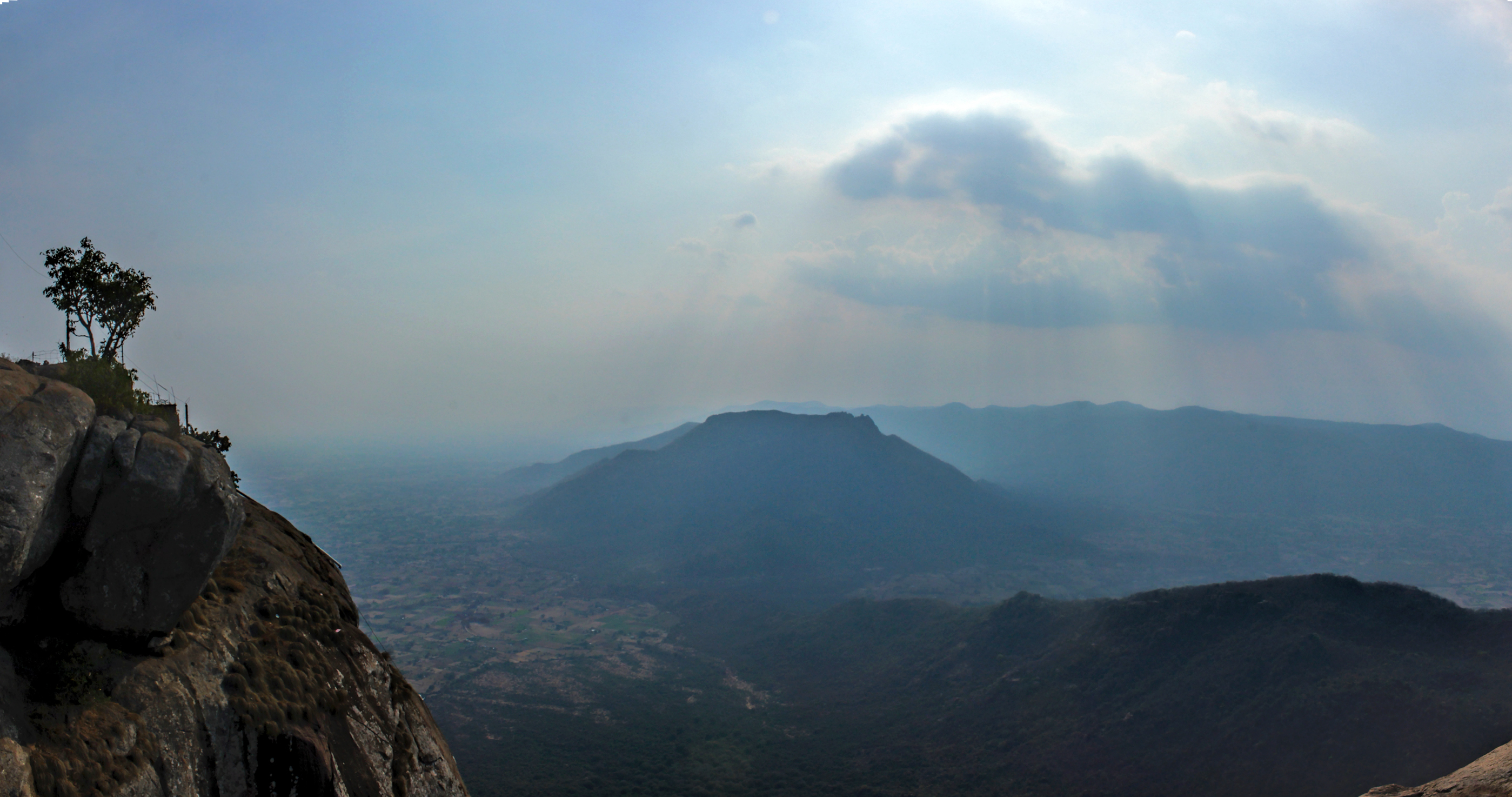
A view of Javadi Hills

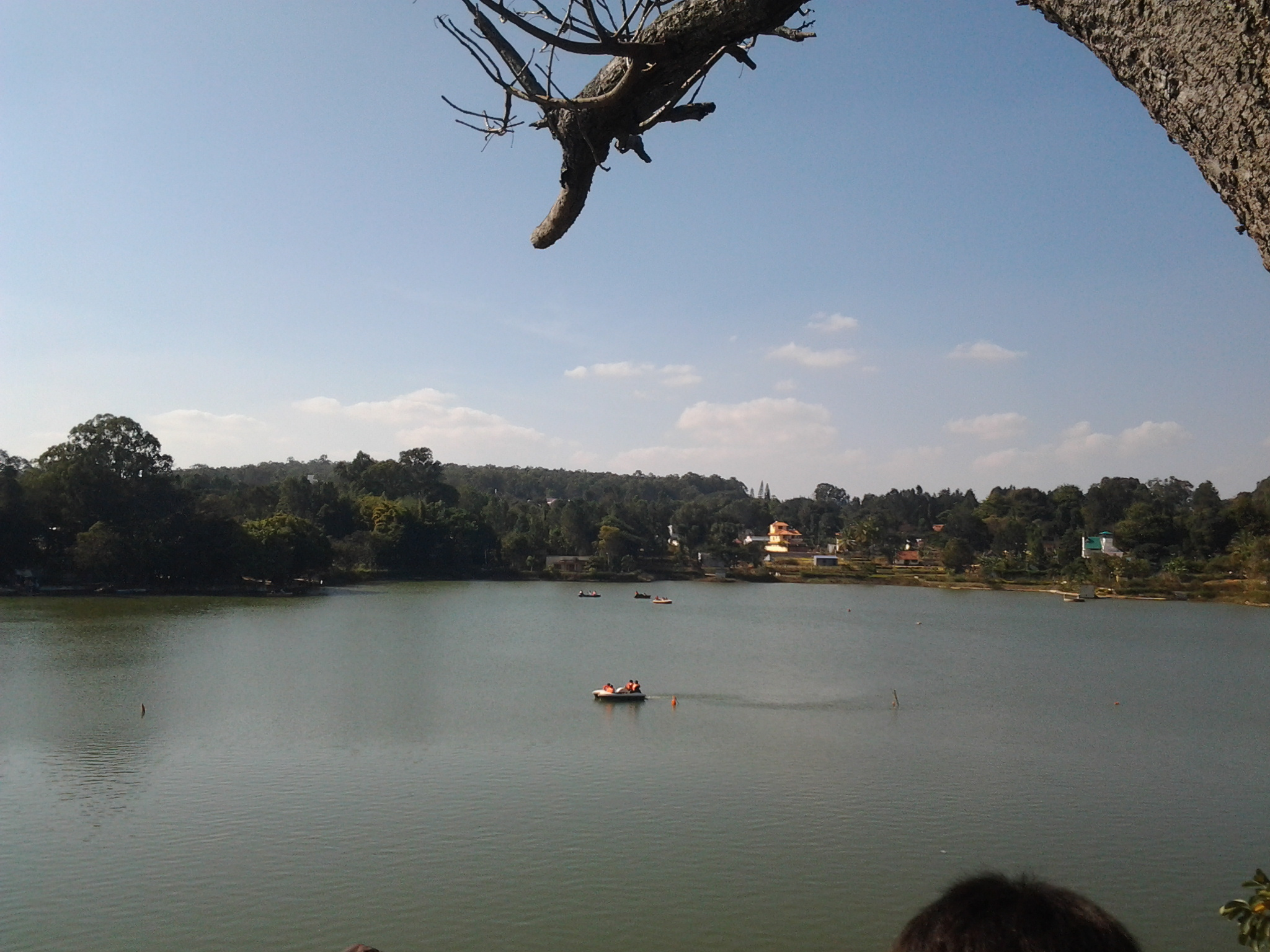
A view of Yelagiri Lake

Asia's second-largest telescope, Vainu Bappu Observatory of the Indian Institute of Astrophysics is situated at Kavalur near Vaniyambadi.

The Sundara Varadaraja Perumal and Athitheeswarar temples are the main draws of this town for pilgrims. The town also has a number of mosques built in the medieval as well as modern Islamic architectural styles. The dargah of Janab Masthan Ali Aulia Saheb draws devotees from all faiths, while the Avanghali temple nearby proclaims this town's great record in harmonious co-existence of different religions. Vaniyambadi is famous for its various local sweets and biryani.

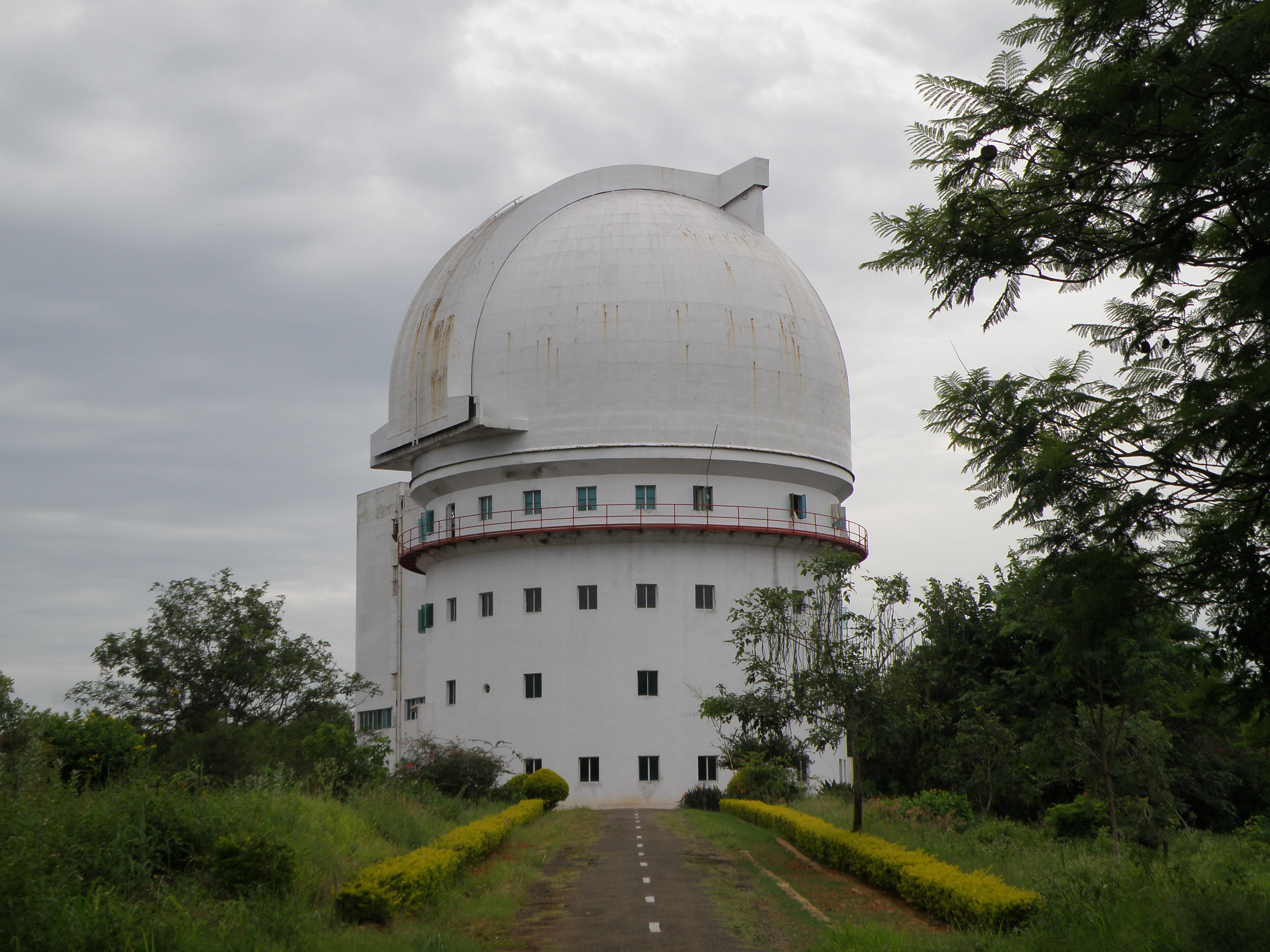
A view of the Vainu Bappu Observatory

Devotees to the temples here often extend their stay to visit one of the two hill stations that lie within half-hour drives from the town centre. Yelagiri, which is one such hilltop resort set amidst a quarter of mountains. The structure of tribal houses and the locals' small-scale industries, such as honey gathering and weaving, attract tourists to this hill station.

== Economy ==
Vaniyambadi plays a major role in the field of leather industry. The main core business of this town is leather tanning and manufacturing of leather goods such as Garments, Gloves and Shoes. Over several decades, Vaniyambadi has contributed to millions of dollars for the Indian economy by exporting leather garments, leather articles and other chemical effluents all over the world. Vaniyambadi has shown better economy for past many decades. There are more than around 150+ tanneries and 2 effluent water treating plants.

== Transport ==
Vaniyambadi is well connected by road and rail to major cities of India. The town is separated by a distance with Bangalore [146 km], Chennai [199 km], Vellore [67 km] and Salem [148 km]. The town lies on the highway (NH 48) of the Bangalore-Chennai section which is part of the Golden Quadrilateral. A state highway connects the town to Tirupattur on the Vaniyambadi-Salem(SH-18), Vaniyambadi-Gudiyattam via Gadambur(SH-130) and Polur-Vaniyambadi via Jamunamarathur, Alangayam(SH-215).

The town also has a railway station and is also close to Jolarpet Railway Junction, where most of the long haul trains stop. The nearest domestic Airport is Vellore Airport and nearest International Airport is Bangalore International Airport and Chennai International Airport. From the town, one can easily travel to the Andhra Pradesh, Karnataka and also to the southern parts of Tamil Nadu.

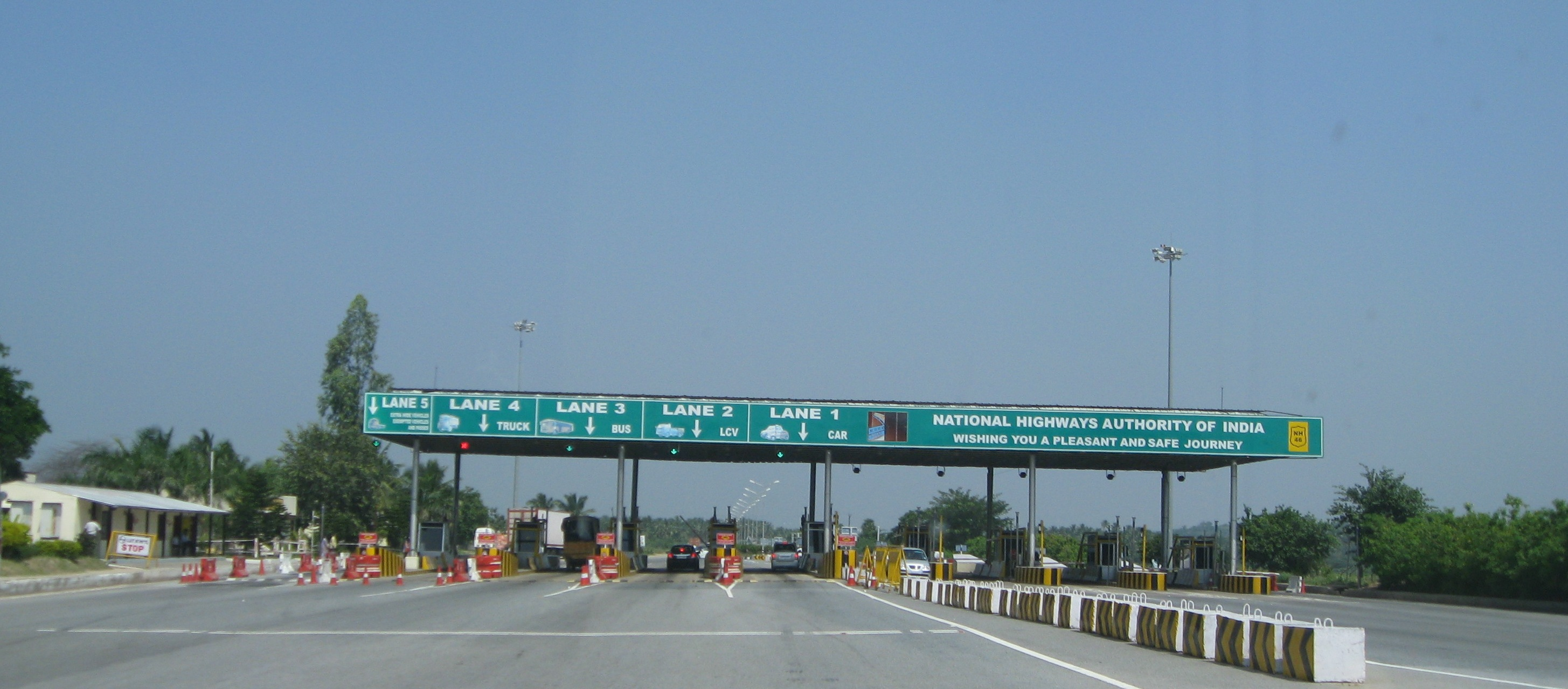
Vaniyambadi Toll Plaza in the Golden Quadrilateral Chennai – Bangalore Highway

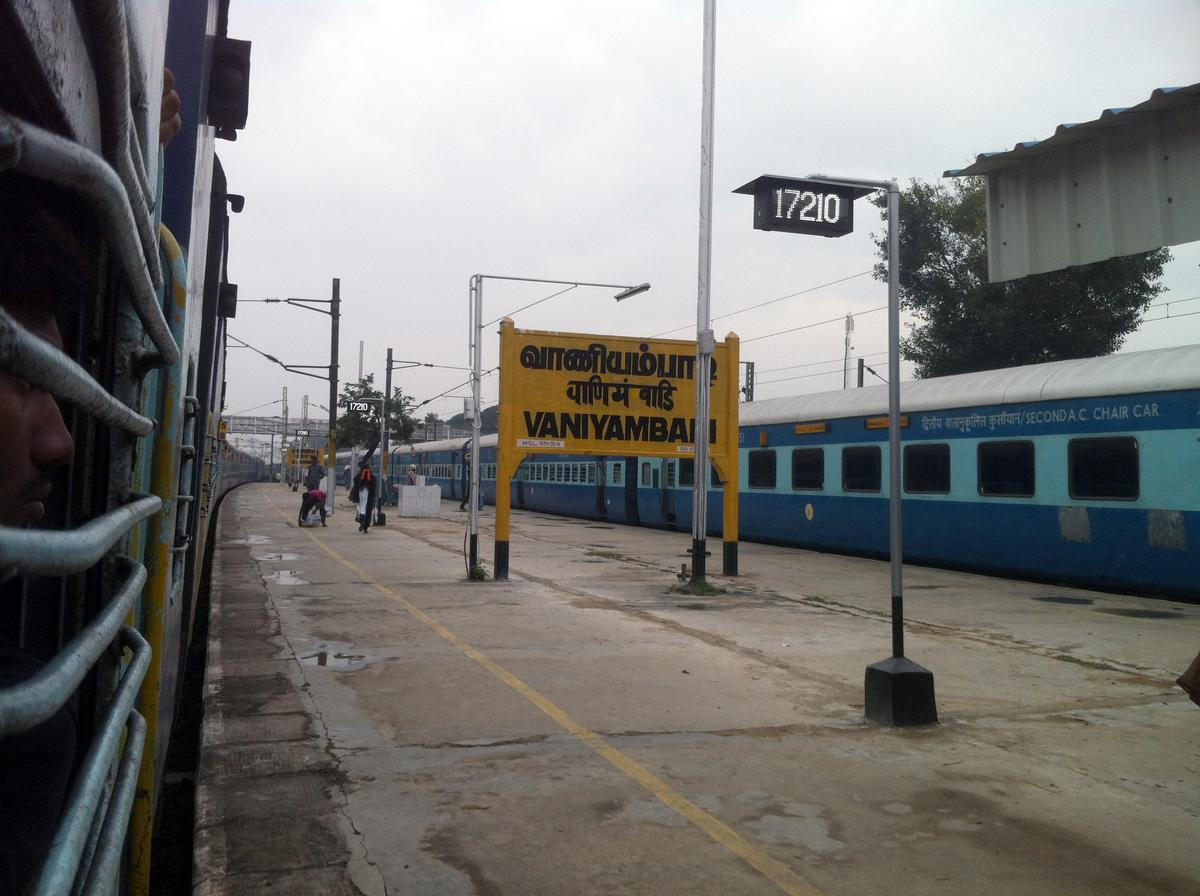
A view of Vaniyambadi Railway Station

Highway Number	Destination	Via
NH 48	Chennai	Vellore, Kanchipuram, Sriperumbudur
NH 48	Bangalore	Krishnagiri, Hosur
NH 48	Krishnagiri	Natrampalli, Bargur
NH 48	Dharmapuri	Krishnagiri, Kaveripattinam
NH 179A	Salem	Uthangarai, Harur
SH 130	Gudiyatham	Ambur, Pernambut
SH 215	Polur	Alangayam
MDR 171	Kuppam	Thumberi, Kollapalli

Train Accidents

On February 12, 1981, three trains—Trivandrum Mail, Yercaud Express and a goods train were involved in a crash that left 20 dead and at least 50 injured. According to news reports, the couplings of a goods train had snapped and the loose wagons slipped onto a second line. The Trivandrum Mail (No 20 Madras Mail) crashed into the wagons and derailed.

== Higher educational institutions ==
The city is the home for some of the prestigious century-old educational institutions. Due to their reputation, students from the surrounding towns of Ambur, Tirupattur, Jolarpet, Pallikonda, Gudiyattam and Alangayam travel here to pursue their higher education. They are listed below:

=== Arts & Science Colleges ===
- Islamiah College (Autonomous) (Est. 1919)
- Islamiah Women's Arts & Science College
- Marudhar Kesari Jain College for Women
- Imayam Arts and Science College, (Est. 2010)
- Wisdom Park International Educational Society

=== Engineering and Polytechnic Institutions ===
- Priyadarshini Engineering College
- Priyadarshini Polytechnic College
- Vaani Polytechnic College, (Est. 2009)

== Notable people ==
- Anandakrishnan M, Padma Shri awardee, former Vice Chancellor of Anna University.
