= Islamiah College =

College in Vaniyambadi, Tamil Nadu, India

Islamiah College (Autonomous)
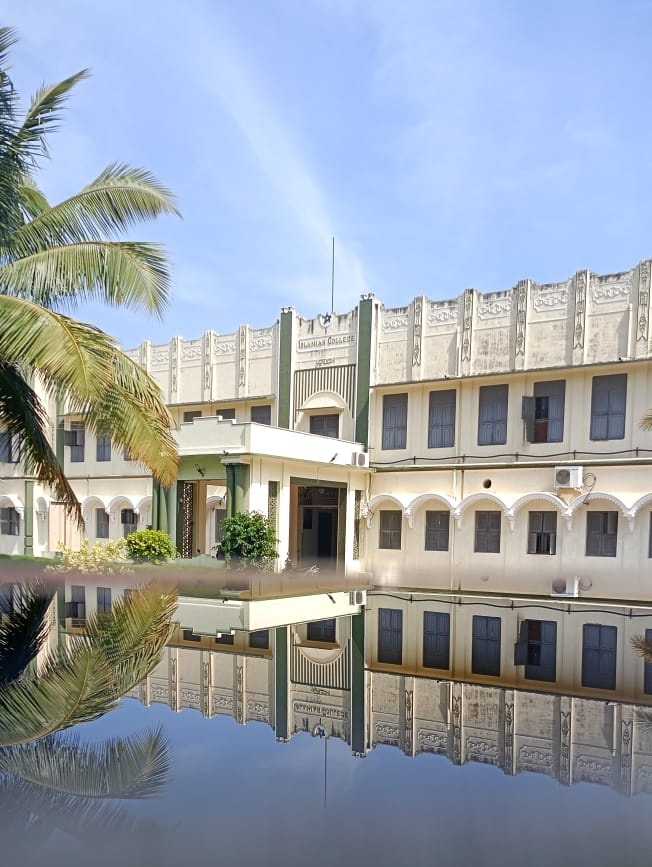
- Heritage Block; Islamiah College (Autonomous)
- Established: 1919
- Affiliations: Thiruvalluvar University
- Provost: Mr. C. Khaiser Ahmed, B.Sc., (Secretary & Correspondent)
- Principal: Dr. Shaik Khader Nawaz, M.A., M.Phil., Ph.D.
- Vice Principals: Dr. Syed Tahir Hussainy, M.Sc., Ph.D.
- Location: Vaniyambadi, Tamil Nadu, India; 12.6851°N 78.6036°E
- Campus: 42 acres; Urban
- Website: www.islamiahcollege.edu.in

Islamiah College (Autonomous) in Vaniyambadi, India

Islamiah College (Autonomous) is a men's general degree college located in Vaniyambadi, Tirupattur District, Tamil Nadu. Established in 1919, it is maintained and managed by the Vaniyambadi Muslim Educational Society. The college began functioning in July 1919 and was affiliated with the University of Madras in 1921. It became a first grade college in 1946, a postgraduate institution in 1974, and a Research Centre in 1986. Since October 2002, the college has been affiliated with Thiruvalluvar University, Vellore. It has educational partnerships with Maulana Azad National Urdu University, Aligarh Muslim University), and the Institute of Cost Accountants of India, among others. The college offers courses in arts, commerce, and science.

== History ==
Islamiah College (Autonomous) is a symbol of devotion to education and love for learning among the Muslims of Vaniyambadi, who, inspired by the message of Sir Syed Ahmed Khan, established the Vaniyambadi Muslim Educational Society in 1901. The society was registered in 1905, and soon under its auspices, the Islamiah Elementary School was started. The growth of the school was due to the service and leadership of Janab T. Hajee Badruddin Sahib, Janab Malang Hayath Basha Sahib, Janab T. Ameeenuddin Sahib, and Janab Malang Ahmed Basha Sahib. The full-fledged Islamiah High School came into being in 1912.

In 1915, the society resolved to establish Islamiah College, and the foundation stone was laid by His Excellency Lord Pentland, the then Governor of Madras Province. With princely donations from Muslim philanthropists, the college was started in 1919 and got recognition in July 1921. The building in which the College is presently housed was opened by Nawab C. Abdul Hakeem Sahib.

In 1946, the college was upgraded to offer instruction in the two-year degree courses B.A. Economics and B.Com. In 1954, B.A. Mathematics was introduced. In 1956, the College received affiliation for pre-university and three-year degree courses, B.A., B.Sc., and B.Com., which commenced in 1957.

The college obtained affiliation from the university for various additional courses:

S.No.	Name of the Course	Major Subject	Year of Affiliation
1	B.Sc.	Chemistry	1963
2	B.A.	History	1967
3	B.Sc.	Zoology	1967
4	M.A.	History	1974
5	M.Com.	Commerce	1975
6	M.Sc.	Mathematics	1976
7	B.Sc.	Physics	1981
8	B.A.	Corporate Secretaryship	1982
9	B.A.	Industrial Organization	1983
10	B.Sc.	Biochemistry	1985
11	M.Phil.	Commerce	1986
12	M.Sc.	Chemistry	1986
13	B.Sc.	Computer Science	1988

To cater to the evolving needs of the community, B.A. (Industrial Organisation) was converted to B.B.A. in 2005, and B.Sc. (Zoology) was converted to B.Sc. (Biotechnology) in 2006.

The college also received affiliation for the following unaided courses:

S.No.	Name of the Course	Major Subject	Year of Affiliation
1	Ph.D.	Commerce	1986
2	M.Phil.	Mathematics	1988
3	M.Phil.	History	1993
4	Ph.D.	History	1996
5	M.Sc.	Physics	1998
6	M.Sc.	Biochemistry	1999
7	M.Phil.	Chemistry	2000
8	B.C.A.	Computer Applications	2000
9	Ph.D.	Chemistry	2005
10	Ph.D.	Mathematics	2005
11	M.Phil.	Biochemistry	2009
12	M.Phil.	Physics	2009
13	B.A.	English Literature	2010
14	M.A.	English Literature	2010
15	M.Sc.	Biotechnology	2010
16	Ph.D.	Physics	2010
17	B.Sc.	Computer Science	2013
18	M.Phil.	Biotechnology	2013
19	Ph.D.	Biotechnology	2014
20	Ph.D.	Biochemistry	2016
21	B.Com.	Commerce	2016
22	B.Sc.	Chemistry	2019
23	B.Sc.	Data Science	2022

In view of the changing scenario, two courses—B.A. (Economics) and B.Com. (Corporate Secretaryship)—were converted to B.Com. (Finance & Accounts) and B.Com. (Computer Applications), respectively, with effect from the academic year 2010–11 to enhance the employability of the students.

The college, which had a humble beginning in 1919, has now grown into a full-fledged postgraduate and research institution catering to the needs of rural students who might otherwise have not dreamed of pursuing a research degree.

Following the establishment of Thiruvalluvar University, the college has been affiliated with it since the academic year 2002–03. In pursuit of academic excellence and acting on the suggestion of the National Assessment and Accreditation Council peer team, the college applied for autonomy in 2008. An expert team inspected the Ccllege in March 2010 and recommended autonomy. The college was conferred autonomy effective from the academic year 2010–11, and successfully completed the first phase of autonomy during the academic year 2015–16. The University Grants Commission granted an extension of autonomy for six years from 2016–17 to 2021–22.

The college entered a new era of educational partnership with Aligarh Muslim University from the academic year 2013–14, widening learning opportunities for both employed and unemployed students seeking degrees, as well as regular students pursuing additional courses.

The aim of the college is to foster in teachers and students, and through them in society, the attitudes and values needed for developing a "good life" in individuals and society.

The college has earned a prominent place for Vaniyambadi on the educational map of India, keeping its portals open to members of all castes and communities.

== Vision and mission ==
=== Vision ===
- To provide quality and relevant education to the poor, downtrodden and minority students with a view to uplifting the society and contributing to the development of the nation.

=== Mission ===
- To provide more and better opportunities for higher learning and research.
- To diversify courses of studies to make them more relevant to present day societal and industrial needs.
- To synthesis arts and science with modern technological innovations and programmes.

== Office bearers ==
=== Presidents ===
No.	Name	Term
1	Janab Sailappai Abdul Khader Sahib	1902–1905
2	Janab Moulvi Al-Haj Ziauddin Mohamed Sahib	1905–1935
3	Janab C. Abdul Hakim Sahib	1935–1938
4	Janab Moulvi Al-Haj Ziauddin Mohamed Sahib	1938–1941
5	Janab Malayalam Hajee Abdul Raheem Sahib	1941–1944
6	Janab Malang Ahmed Basha Sahib	1944–1947
7	Janab P.R. Md. Fazlullah Sahib, B.A., B.L.	1947–1948
8	Janab Kaniyambadi Abdul Wahab Sahib	1948–1951
9	Janab N.M. Anwar Sahib, M.A.	1951–1973
10	Dr. J. Azeezur Rahman Sahib, M.B.B.S.	1973–1981
11	Dr. G. Hajee Abdul Shukoor Sahib, M.B.B.S.	1981–1984
12	Janab Pallan Hajee Khaleelur Rahman Sahib	1984–1986
13	Janab V.P. Naimur Rahman Sahib	1986–1991
14	Janab Motoor Nazeer Ahmed Sahib	1991–1997
15	Janab C. Abdul Malick Sahib, B.Com.	1997–2005
16	Janab M.L. Mohamed Aslam Sahib	2005–2007
17	Janab S.C. Mohammed Hussain Sahib, M.A.	2007–2011
18	Janab T. Mohamed Mubeen Sahib, B.E., M.Sc. (Engg.), M.I.I.E.	2011–2019
19	Janab Mouda Ahmed Basha Sahib, B.Com.	2019–Present

=== General Secretaries ===
No.	Name	Term
1	Janab Malayalam Ameenuddin Sahib	1902–1905
2	Janab Yakub Hasan Sait Sahib	1905–1913
3	Nawab Ghulam Ahmed Sahib Kalami	1913–1917
4	T. Hajee Badrudin Sahib	1917–1925
5	Padyari Abdul Shukoor Sahib	1925–1930
6	P.R. Abdul Hameed Sahib	1930–1935
7	Kaniyambadi Abdul Wahab Sahib	1935–1941
8	Malang Ahmed Badsha Sahib, B.A.	1941–1944
9	C.L. Hajee Abdul Subhan Sahib	1944–1948
10	T.K. Mohamed Zackriah Sahib	1948–1955
11	Naivasal Mohamed Hussain Sahib	1955–1958
12	M.L. Hajee Abdul Jabbar Sahib	1958–1967
13	M. Nazeer Ahmed Sahib	1967–1981
14	Kaka Md. Zubair Sahib	1981–1984
15	T.K. Hajee Md. Shameem Sahib	1984–1989
16	Kaka Md. Zubair Sahib	1989–2000
17	Mandi Md. Farooq Sahib, B.A.	2000–2008
18	Takadi Aarif Akthar Sahib, B.Sc.	2008–2011
19	C. Khaiser Ahmed Sahib, B.Sc.	2011–2013
20	Dr. Anwarullah Hajee Sahib, M.B.B.S.	2013–2016
21	C. Khaiser Ahmed Sahib, B.Sc.	2016–2019
22	Ghani Mohammed Azhar Sahib, B.Sc.	2019–2023
23	Pudupet Abdullah Basha Sahib, B.Com.	2023–Present

=== Secretaries to the College Committee ===
No.	Name	Term
1	Malang Ahmed Badsha Sahib, B.A.	1920–1941
2	P.R. Md. Fazlullah Sahib, B.A., B.L.	1941–1947
3	N.M. Anwar Sahib, M.A.	1947–1951
4	S. Abdul Azeez Badsha Sahib	1951–1952
5	M.L. Hajee Abdul Jabbar Sahib	1952–1955
6	T.K. Hajee Abdul Rasheed Sahib	1955–1967
7	Naivasal Md. Hussain Sahib	1967–1969
8	A. Nazeer Ahmed Sahib, B.Com.	1969–1974

=== Correspondents ===
No.	Name	Term
1	Yakub Hasan Sait Sahib	1905–1917
2	Malang Ahmed Badsha Sahib, B.A.	1917–1941
3	P.R. Md. Fazlullah Sahib, B.A., B.L.	1941–1947
4	Naivasal Md. Hussain Sahib	1947–1955
5	M.L. Hajee Abdul Jabbar Sahib	1955–1958
6	C.S. Hajee Abdul Majeed Sahib	1958–1969
7	Dr. G. Hajee Abdul Shukoor Sb., M.B.B.S.	1969–1974

=== Secretary and Correspondents ===
No.	Name	Term
1	A. Nazeer Ahmed Sahib, B.Com.	1974–1979
2	K. Md. Umair Sahib	1979–1981
3	V.P. Naimur Rahman Sahib, B.Sc.	1981–1984
4	Kaka Md. Zubair Sahib	1984–1989
5	S.C. Mohammed Hussain Sb, M.A.	1989–1996
6	Malang Aslam Basha Sahib, B.Com.	1996–2005
7	C. Khaiser Ahmed Sahib, B.Sc.	2005–2011
8	Ghani Md. Jaweed Sahib, B.Sc.	2011–2013
9	L.M. Muneer Ahmed Sahib, B.Sc.	2013–2016
10	Dr. Anwarullah Hajee Sahib, M.B.B.S.	2016–2019
11	L.M. Muneer Ahmed Sahib, B.Sc.	2019–2025
12	C. Khaiser Ahmed Sahib, B.Sc.	2025–Present

=== Principals ===
No.	Name	Term
1	Mr. S. Qadir Mohammed Nainar, B.A. (Hons.)	1919–1920
2	Mr. Ghulam Dastagir, B.A., L.T.	1920–1923
3	Mr. Md. Abdul Ali, B.A., L.T.	1923–1924
4	Mr. R. Souriraj Iyengar, B.A., L.T.	1924–1925
5	Mr. T. Swaminathan Iyer, M.A.	1925–1926
6	Mr. K. Ramaswamy Gounder, M.A., L.T.	1926–1927
7	Mr. Hajee Ahmed Ali, M.A., L.T.	1927–1941
8	Mr. Hajee Syed Abdul Wahab Bukhari, M.A., L.T.	1941–1944
9	Mr. Hajee Ahmed Ali, M.A., L.T.	1944–1947
10	Mr. D.T. Subramaniyan, M.A.	1947–1948
11	Mr. S. Abdul Qadir, M.A.	1948–1958
12	Mr. V. Sivaramakrishnan, M.A.	1958–1959
13	Dr. M. Abdul Rahim, M.A., B.T., Ph.D.	1959–1962
14	Mr. K. Sitaraman, B.A. (Hons.)	1962–1967
15	Mr. N. Md. Zubair, M.A., B.L.	1967–1970
16	Mr. Syed Yakub, M.A., L.T.	1970–1971
17	Mr. Mirza Abdul Majid, M.A., L.L.B.	1971–1986
18	Mr. A. Habibur Rahman, M.A., M.Phil.	1986–1996
19	Mr. O.A. Shahul Hameed, M.Sc., M.Phil.	1996–1997
20	Dr. N. Tahir Ahmed, M.A., B.Sc., Ph.D.	1997–2000
21	Dr. Major Syed Shahabuddeen, M.A. (Hist.), M.A. (Pol.Sc.), B.Ed., M.Phil., Ph.D.	2001–2009
22	Mr. P. Nasrullah Basha, M.Com., M.Phil.	2009–2011
23	Dr. K. Prem Nazeer, M.Sc., M.Phil., Ph.D.	2011–2018
24	Dr. T. Mohamed Ilyas, M.Com., M.B.A., M.Phil., Ph.D.	2018–2024
25	Dr. T. Afsar Basha, M.Com., M.Phil., Ph.D.	2024–2026
26	Dr. Shaik Khader Nawaz, M.A., M.Phil., Ph.D.	2026–present

== Degree programmes ==
=== Under Graduate Programmes ===
- Duration: 6 Semesters – 3 Years
- System: Choice Based Credit System (CBCS)

Programme	Specializations
B.A.	History
B.Sc.	Mathematics, Physics, Chemistry, Biochemistry, Biotechnology, Computer Science, Data Science
B.Com.	Commerce, Finance and Accounts, Computer Applications
B.B.A.	Business Administration (AICTE Approved)
B.C.A.	Computer Applications (AICTE Approved)

=== Post Graduate Programmes ===
- Duration: 4 Semesters – 2 Years
- System: Choice Based Credit System (CBCS)

Programme	Specializations
M.A.	History
M.Sc.	Mathematics, Chemistry, Biochemistry, Biotechnology
M.Com.	Commerce

=== Research Programmes (Ph.D.) ===
- System: Choice Based Credit System

Programme	Specialization
Ph.D.	History, Commerce, Mathematics, Chemistry, Physics, Biotechnology, Biochemistry, Tamil, English, Urdu

== Departments ==
=== Science ===
- Physics
- Chemistry
- Mathematics
- Biochemistry
- Biotechnology
- Computer Science

=== Arts and Commerce ===
- Urdu & Arabic
- Hindi
- Tamil
- English
- History
- Business Administration
- Commerce - General
- Commerce - Finance & Accounts
- Commerce - Computer Applications

=== Others ===
- BCA & Data Science
- Physical Education

== Accreditation ==
The college is recognized by the University Grants Commission.

It is re-accredited by the National Assessment and Accreditation Council, Bengaluru, with an 'A++' grade during its 3rd cycle, achieving a CGPA of 3.55 out of 4. The accreditation is valid for 7 years, from 21 March 2024 to 20 March 2031.

The University Grants Commission, New Delhi, has granted a further extension of autonomy to the college for 10 years, from the academic year 2022–23 to 2031–32.
