= Athitheeswarar Temple =

Shiva temple in Tirupathur district, Tamil Nadu, India

- Athitheeswarar Temple, Vaniyambadi, Tirupathur district, Tamil Nadu

Religion
- Affiliation: Hinduism
- District: Tirupathur
- Deity: Athitheeswarar
- Festivals: Maha Shivaratri, Brahmotsava, Saraswati Puja

Location
- Location: Vaniyambadi
- State: Tamil Nadu
- Country: India
- Interactive map of Athitheeswarar Temple
- Coordinates: 12.680561°N 78.596755°E

Architecture
- Type: Dravidian architecture
- Creator: Pallava kings
- Completed: 1,000 years ago

Specifications
- Temple: One
- Elevation: 375.31 m (1,231 ft)

Athitheeswarar Temple is a Shiva temple in Vaniyambadi neighbourhood in Tamil Nadu state in India. This temple is built more than thousand years ago.

== Location ==
Athitheeswarar temple is located with the coordinates of (12.680561°N 78.596755°E) in Vaniyambadi.

Athitheeswarar Temple (Tamil Nadu)

== Festivals ==
Maha Shivaratri, Chithirai Brahmotsava and Maargallhi Thiruvaathirai are the important festivals celebrated in this temple.

== Sub deities ==
Shankara Narayana, Dakshinamurti, Saraswati, Saptamatrikas (Brahmi, Maheshwari, Kaumari, Chamundi, Vaishnavi, Varahi and Indirani), Dwara Ganapathy, Subramanian with His consorts Valli and Devasena and Ayyappan are the sub deities in this temple.
