= Alangayam =

- Town
- Location in Tamil Nadu, India
- Coordinates: 12.6°N 78.75°E
- Country: India
- State: Tamil Nadu
- District: Tirupathur
- Elevation: 572 m (1,877 ft)

Population (2011)
  - Total: 18,327

Languages
  - Official: Tamil
- Time zone: UTC+5:30 (IST)
- PIN: 635701
- Telephone code: 04174
- Vehicle registration: TN-83
- Sex ratio: 1000 females for every 1000 males ♂/♀

Alangayam is a Selection Grade Town Panchayat in Tirupathur district in the state of Tamil Nadu, India. It is located at 18 km from Vaniyambadi.

Alangayam is 8 km from the famous Vainu Bappu Observatory in Kavalur. This town is surrounded by mountains on all sides, which keeps Alangayam at a moderate temperature for most of the year.

Alangayam comprises villages named Kalai Koil, Peddur, Badakuppam, Pulugarpalli, Gejjaloor, Bunkur, Nadumiyur, Rajapalayam, MGR Nagar, Narasingapuram, Kallaraipatti and Konkiyur.

Alangayam is a Town Panchayat in district of Thirupattur, Tamil Nadu. The Alangayam Town Panchayat is divided into 15 wards. Alangayam Town Panchayat has population of 18,327 of which 9,059 are males while 9,268 are females as per report released by Census India 2011.

== Climate ==
Climate data for Alangayam, Tamil Nadu, India
Month	Jan	Feb	Mar	Apr	May	Jun	Jul	Aug	Sep	Oct	Nov	Dec	Year
Mean daily maximum °F (°C)	82.6 (28.1)	87.4 (30.8)	92.7 (33.7)	95.5 (35.3)	97.0 (36.1)	93.0 (33.9)	89.8 (32.1)	89.6 (32.0)	89.1 (31.7)	86.2 (30.1)	82.4 (28.0)	80.6 (27.0)	88.8 (31.6)
Daily mean °F (°C)	72.5 (22.5)	75.7 (24.3)	80.4 (26.9)	84.6 (29.2)	86.4 (30.2)	84.0 (28.9)	81.5 (27.5)	81.3 (27.4)	80.6 (27.0)	78.3 (25.7)	74.5 (23.6)	72.0 (22.2)	79.3 (26.3)
Mean daily minimum °F (°C)	62.6 (17.0)	64.2 (17.9)	68.2 (20.1)	73.8 (23.2)	75.9 (24.4)	75.0 (23.9)	73.4 (23.0)	73.0 (22.8)	72.1 (22.3)	70.3 (21.3)	66.7 (19.3)	63.5 (17.5)	69.9 (21.1)
Average rainfall inches (mm)	0.354 (9.0)	0.197 (5.0)	0.354 (9.0)	1.142 (29.0)	3.189 (81.0)	2.165 (55.0)	4.173 (106.0)	4.764 (121.0)	5.512 (140.0)	7.323 (186.0)	4.173 (106.0)	1.457 (37.0)	34.803 (884)

== Demographics ==
As of 2001 India census, Alangayam had a population of 16,851. Males constitute 50% of the population and females 50%. 13% of the population is under 6 years of age. Kavalur, the place where Asia's second largest Observatory is situated 8 km from Alangayam. It is in the foot of Yelagiri Hill and Javadu Hills of Tirupathur district. Alangayam is surrounded by forests which is an integral part of disturbed Eastern Ghats.

== Transport ==
Alangayam has a bus station which connects to many cities, including Thirupattur and Vaniyambadi. From these, it is possible to get connections to Vellore and other major cities in Tamil Nadu.
