= Ambur taluk =

Administrative division in India

Coordinates: 12.78°N 78.7°E

Ambur taluk is an administrative division in the Tirupathur of Tamil Nadu, India. The headquarters of the taluk is the town of Ambur. There are 78 revenue villages under this taluk namely Oomerabad etc.

== Demographics ==
According to the 2011 census, the taluk of Ambur had a population of 324884 with 161454 males and 163429 females. There were 1012 women for every 1000 men. The taluk had a literacy rate of 72.79. Child population in the age group below 6 was 17368 Males and 16621 Females.
