= Tirupathur division =

Tirupathur division is a revenue division in the Tirupathur district of Tamil Nadu, India.

It comprises the Taluks of

1.Tirupattur and

2.Natrampalli
