= Uthayendram =

Coordinates: 12°42′37″N 78°37′28″E

- Town
- Interactive map of Uthayendram
- Country: India
- State: Tamil Nadu
- District: Tirupathur

Population (2001)
  - Total: 11,598

Languages
  - Official: Tamil
- Time zone: UTC+5:30 (IST)

Uthayendram is a town in Tirupathur district in the Indian state of Tamil Nadu.

== Demographics ==
As of 2001 India census, Uthayendram had a population of 11,598. Males constitute 49% of the population and females 51%. Uthayendram has an average literacy rate of 67%, higher than the national average of 59.5%: male literacy is 76%, and female literacy is 59%. In Uthayendram, 11% of the population is under 6 years of age.
