= Pathur =

Pathur may refer to the following places in India:

- Pathur, Medak, Telangana
- Pathur, Kasaragod, Kerala

== See also ==
- Tirupattur (disambiguation)
