= Vaniyambadi taluk =

Coordinates: 12.68°N 78.62°E

Vaniyambadi taluk is a taluk in Tirupathur district of the Indian state of Tamil Nadu. The headquarters of the taluk is the town of Vaniyambadi.

== Demographics ==
According to the 2011 census, the taluk of Vaniyambadi had a population of 335,767 with 168,705 males and 167,062 females. There were 990 women for every 1000 men. The taluk had a literacy rate of 67.79. Child population in the age group below 6 was 19,677 Males and 18,333 Females.
