= Madhanur block =

The Madhanur is a revenue block in the Tirupattur district of Tamil Nadu, India. It has a total of 36 panchayat villages, and one town, Ambur.

== Palaiyam ==
- "Map of revenue blocks of Vellore district". Government of Tamil Nadu. Archived from the original on 4 March 2016.
