= Natrampalli block =

The Natrampalli block is a revenue block in the Tirupattur district of Tamil Nadu, India. It has a total of 26 panchayat villages.
