= Malai Vellalar =

Indian ethnic group

- Religions: Hinduism
- Languages: Tamil
- Country: India
- Original state: Tamil Nadu
- Region: South India
- Related groups: Dravidian people

Malai Vellalar is a Tamil-speaking community from South India, especially the state of Tamil Nadu.

They are Hindus and follow Phratry system. They mostly reside in hill regions and engage in various occupations such as agriculture and trade for their living.
