= Yelagiri =

Hill station in Tamil Nadu, India

- Hill Station
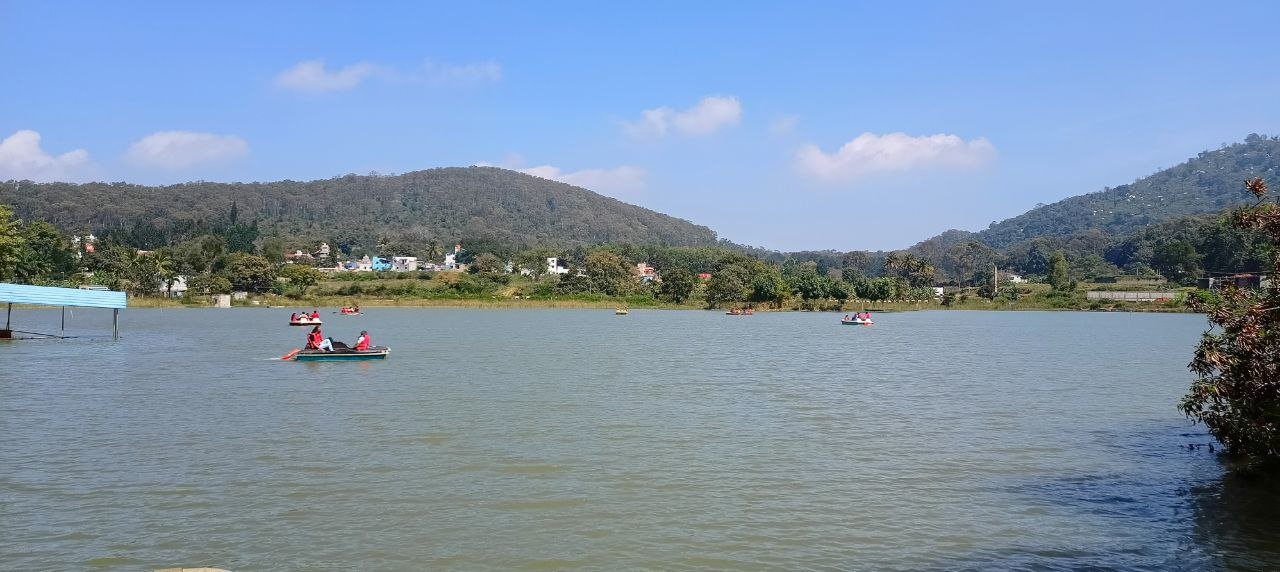
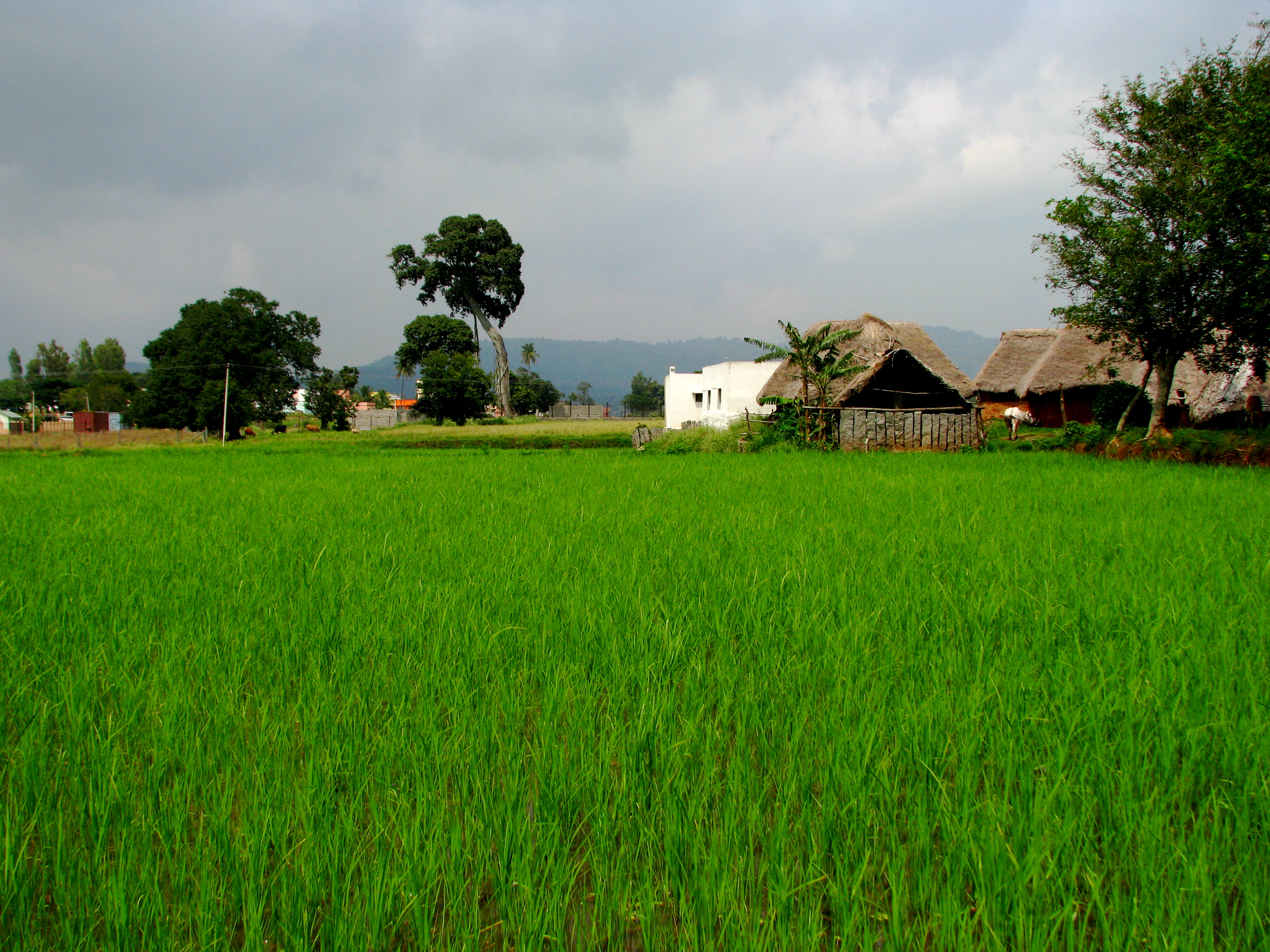
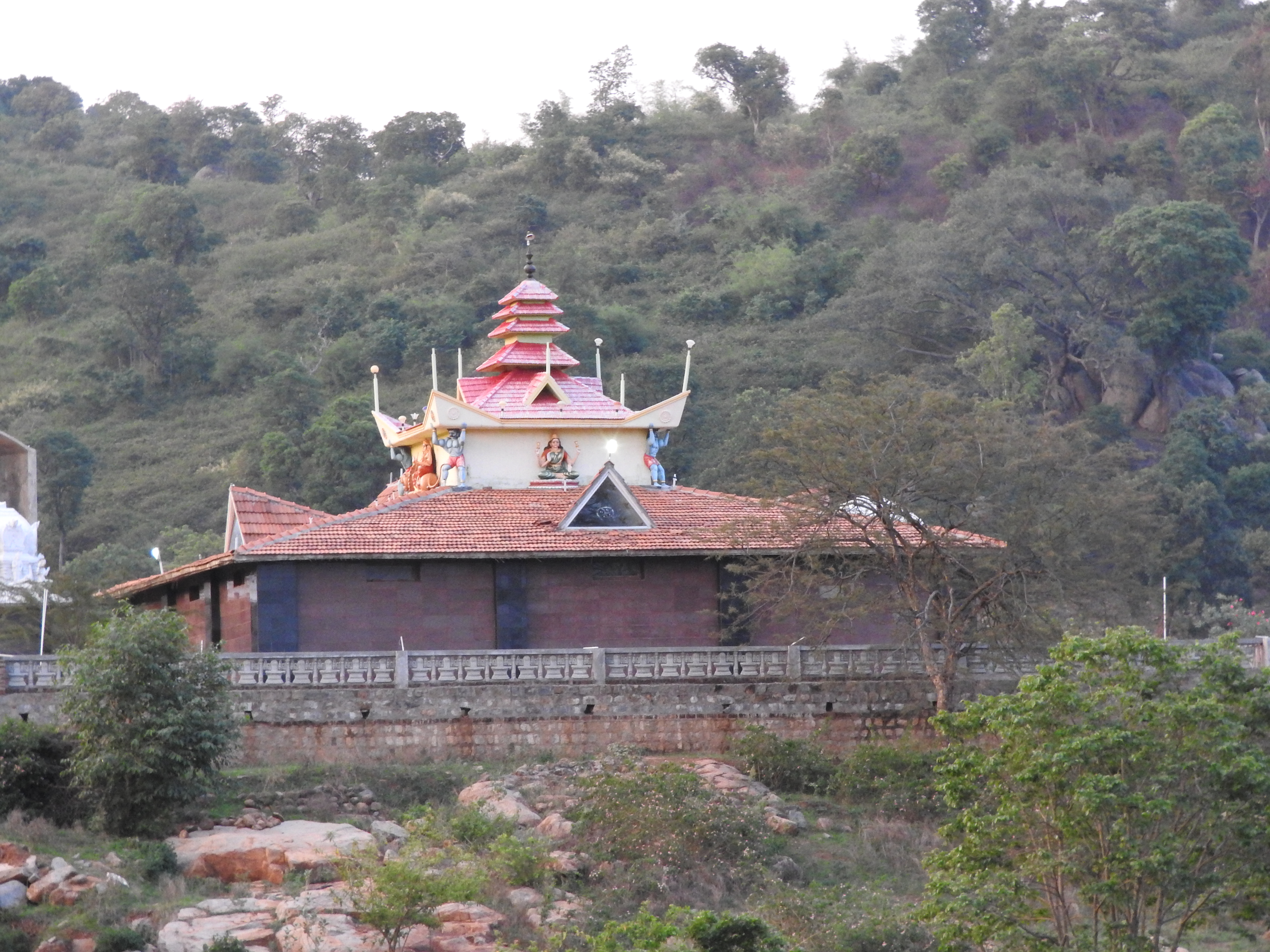
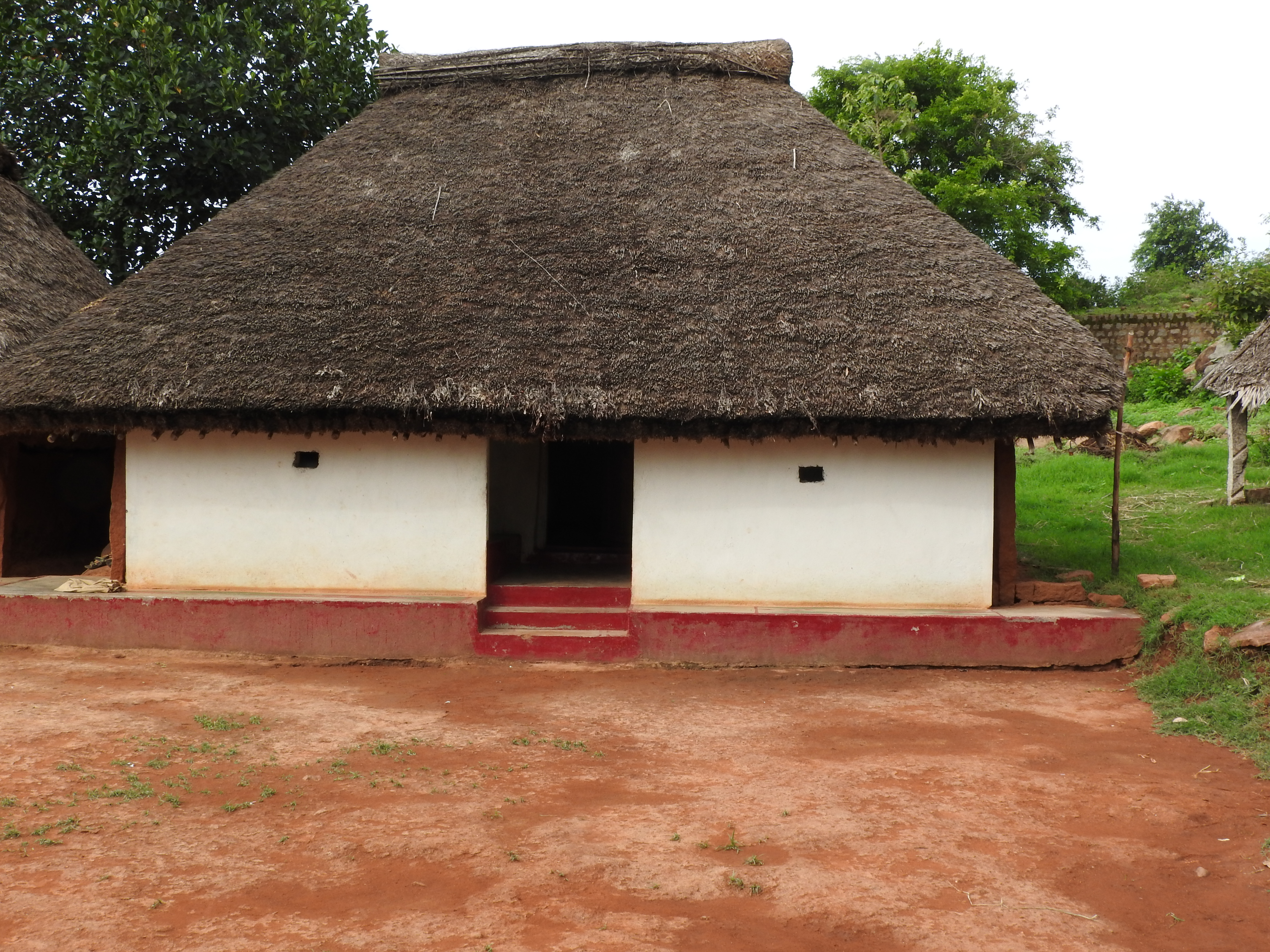
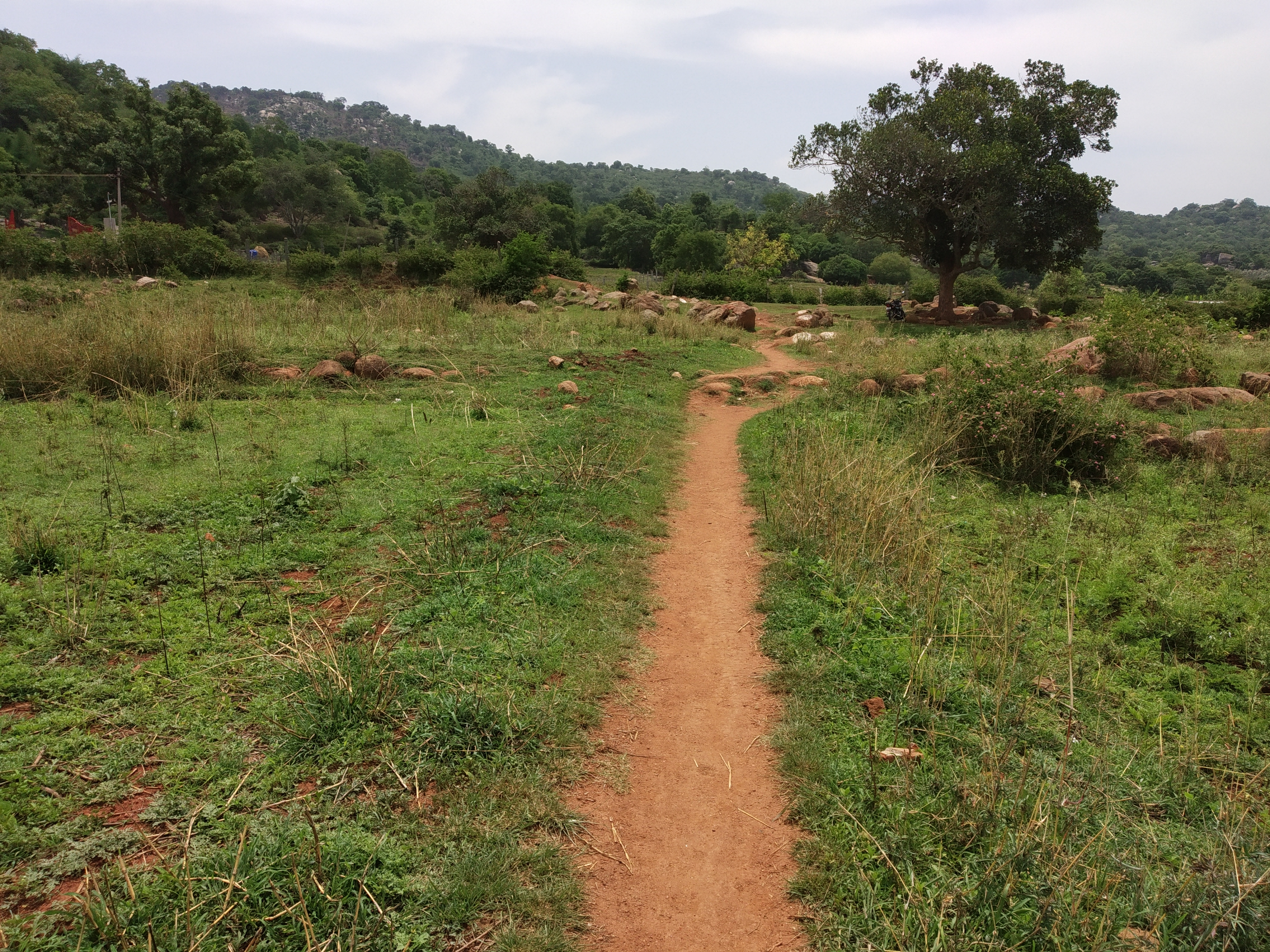
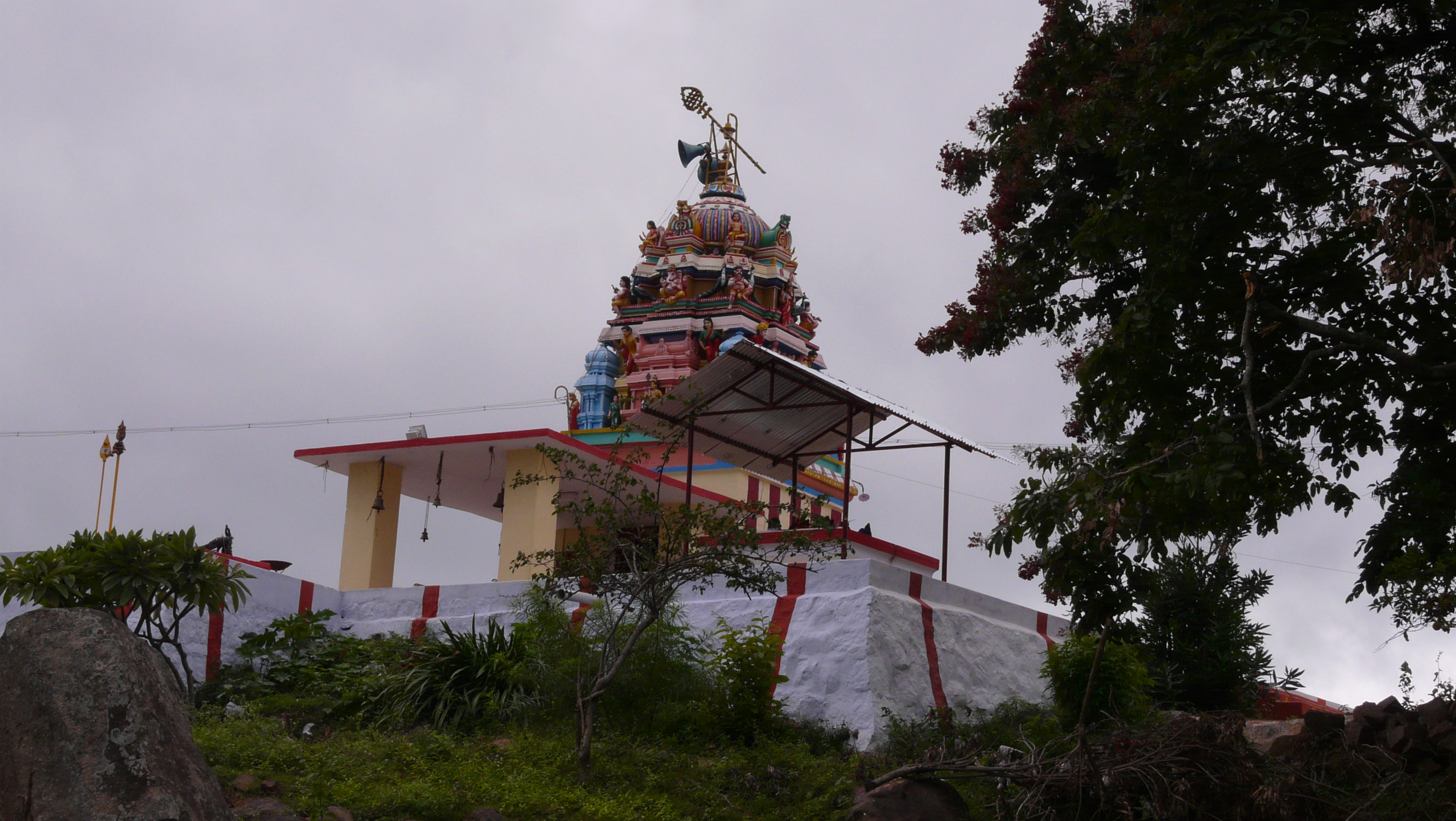
- Clockwise from top: Yelagiri lake; Siva-Parvati temple; An unpaved mud road; Velavan temple; A traditional hut; and Paddy fields

- Location in Tamil Nadu, India
- Coordinates: 12.5781°N 78.6407°E
- Country: India
- State: Tamil Nadu
- District: Tirupattur district
- Region: Vellore

Area
  - Total: 29.2 km^{2} (11.3 sq mi)
- Elevation: 1,410 m (4,630 ft)

Population (2011)
  - Total: 4,409
  - Density: 151/km^{2} (391/sq mi)

Languages
  - Official: Tamil
- Time zone: UTC+5:30 (IST)
- PIN: 635853
- Vehicle registration: TN-83Z

Yelagiri (Tamil: [jeːlaɡiɾi]), also spelled Elagiri, is a hill station located in Tirupathur district of Tamil Nadu, India. Located at an altitude of 1,410 m (4,630 ft), it forms a part of the Eastern Ghats mountain range. The hills consist of 14 hamlets spread across an area of 72 km^{2} (28 sq mi).

== Etymology ==
As per folklore, when Hindu god Vishnu visited the earth, he planted his feet on the hills. As the people could not stand his weight, they yelled ‘yelo’ in fear (‘kili’ in Tamil), which later became Yelagiri. As per Hindu beliefs, Vishnu came to the hills later to marry goddess Lakshmi, who is known by the name "Yelagiri Thayar" and the region came to be known as Yeloshwaram.

== History ==
While the region was probably ruled by tribal chieftains during the early Sangam period, it was under the rule of the Cheras, Pandyas and Cholas over different periods of history. The hills are mentioned in Tamil literature by Ottakoothar in 12th century CE. It was under the control of Vijayanagara Empire in the late Middle Ages, who established sway over the region. In the latter part of the 18th century, the region came under the Kingdom of Mysore and after the Anglo-Mysore Wars and the Polygar Wars, the British East India Company annexed the region to the Madras Presidency the early 19th century.

In the 19th century, Malai Vellalar (Malayali) hill tribes, populated the region. Later, the British Empire took control of the region from the British East India Company in 1857. The hills were organized as private properties of the Zamindars of Yelagiri. After Indian Independence in 1947, the region was taken over by the Government of India and became part of the Madras State, which later became Tamil Nadu.

== Demographics ==
Though the region has been occupied during prehistoric times, recent settlement occurred in the 19th century, when about 200 Malayali tribes populated the area and practiced agriculture. As per the 2011 census, the hills had a population of 4,409 residing in 1,128 households including a population of 538 under the age of six. The population included 3,318 scheduled tribes and 230 scheduled caste. The population included 2,170 males and 2,239 females with a sex ratio of 1,032. The literacy rate was 65.8%.

== Administration ==
The area is administered by a town panchayat as a part of the Jolapettai block of Tirupattur taluk. The panchayat is responsible for the basic infrastructure such as road, lighting, water supply and sanitation. There is one primary health center catering to healthcare needs of the population.

== Geography ==
Yelagiri is located in Tirupathur district of Tamil Nadu. Located at an altitude of 1,410 m (4,630 ft), it forms a part of the Eastern Ghats mountain range. The hills consist of 14 hamlets spread across an area of 72 km^{2} (28 sq mi). Punganoor lake is a man-made lake covering 56.71 m^{2} (610.4 sq ft) in the hills. The highest point is the Swamimalai hills at an altitude of 1,410 m (4,630 ft). The hills are rich in flora with orchards, rose-gardens, and green valleys.

=== Climate ===
Yelagiri's has a warm climate in summer and is cooler in the winter. The climate is considered to be Aw according to the Köppen-Geiger climate classification.

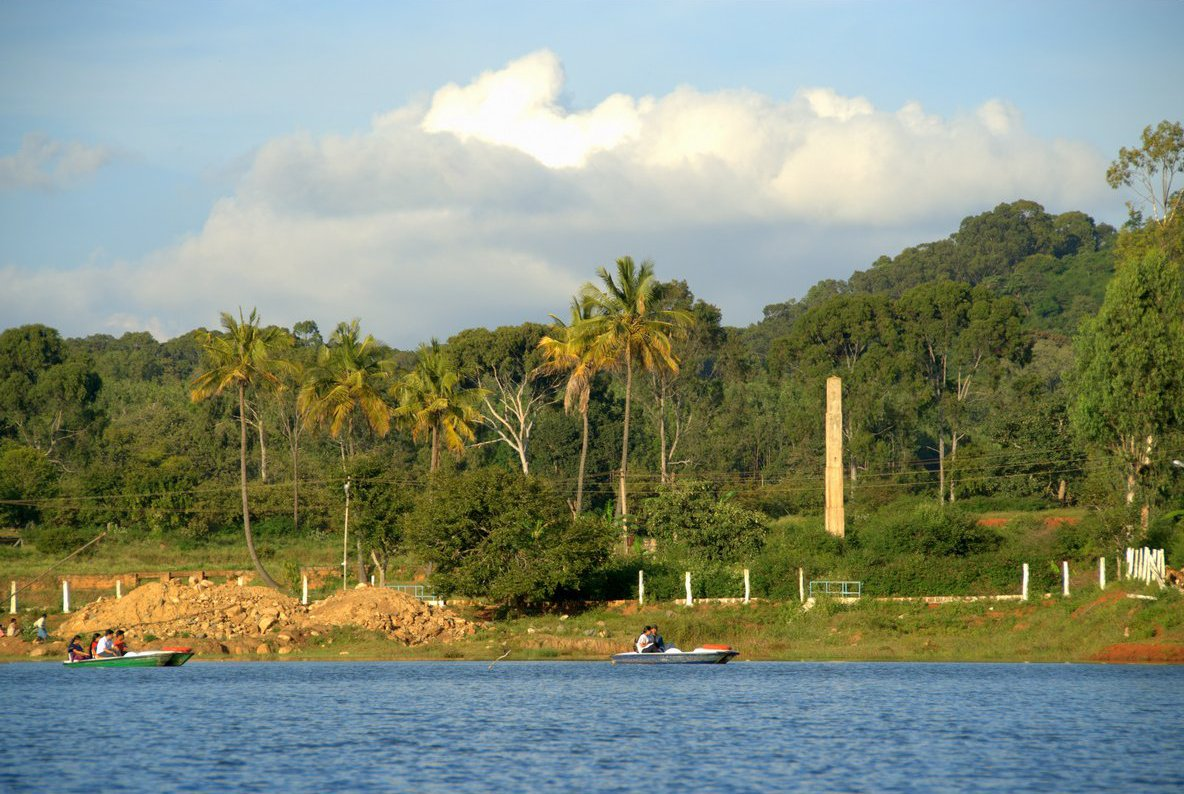
Yelagiri lake is a man-made lake

Climate data for Yelagiri
Month	Jan	Feb	Mar	Apr	May	Jun	Jul	Aug	Sep	Oct	Nov	Dec	Year
Mean daily maximum °C (°F)	25.2 (77.4)	28.0 (82.4)	30.2 (86.4)	31.1 (88.0)	32.6 (90.7)	30.8 (87.4)	28.4 (83.1)	28.4 (83.1)	28.3 (82.9)	27.0 (80.6)	25.5 (77.9)	24.4 (75.9)	28.3 (83.0)
Mean daily minimum °C (°F)	14.0 (57.2)	15.0 (59.0)	17.1 (62.8)	19.9 (67.8)	20.6 (69.1)	20.9 (69.6)	19.7 (67.5)	19.5 (67.1)	19.0 (66.2)	18.4 (65.1)	16.4 (61.5)	14.6 (58.3)	17.9 (64.3)
Average precipitation mm (inches)	8 (0.3)	7 (0.3)	11 (0.4)	38 (1.5)	79 (3.1)	61 (2.4)	106 (4.2)	132 (5.2)	150 (5.9)	193 (7.6)	104 (4.1)	66 (2.6)	955 (37.6)

== Transport ==
The hills can be accessed by a mountain road with 14 hair pin bends, branching out from National Highway 48. It is situated about 220 km (140 mi) from the state capital Chennai and 160 km (99 mi) from Bengaluru. The major access roads are maintained by the Department of Highways and Minor Ports of Government of Tamil Nadu. The nearest major rail head is at Jolarpettai, located about 19 km (12 mi) away. The nearest airport about 155 km (96 mi) away is located at Salem, which has limited domestic flights with major international airports at Bengaluru and Chennai.

== Tourism ==
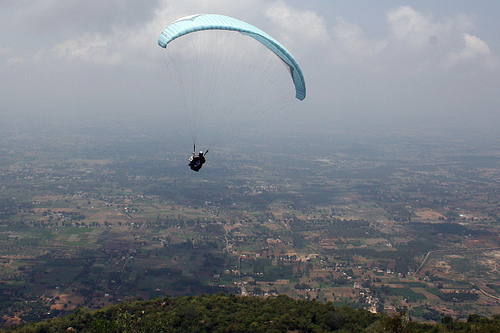
Paragliding at Yelagiri

Tourism forms a major part of the economy of the hills. The lake has boating facilities and is accompanied by a park. Other places of interest include Jalagamparai waterfalls, Telescope observatory and Swamimalai hills. The district administration has taken up development of the hills in 2007. Though many of the facilities developed during the plan in 2007, have been badly maintained.

A herbal farm is maintained by the Government of Tamil Nadu. Temples include Kalyana Venkataramana Perumal temple, Nilavur Amman temple, Jalagandeeswarar temple and Velavan temple. Trekking activities are carried out at Swamimalai hills and adventure sports such as paragliding and rock climbing are being promoted by the Government. The yeary "Yelagiri Summer Festival" is celebrated in May and is organised by Tamil Nadu Tourism Development Corporation. Stalls from different departments, flowers show, dog show and various cultural programs are conducted.
