= Tirupattur taluk =

Tirupathur Taluk
- Taluk
- Location in Tamil Nadu, India
- Coordinates: 12.50°N 78.60°E
- Country: India
- State: Tamil Nadu
- District: Tirupathur

Government
  - MLA: MR.A.NALLATHAMBI
- Elevation: 387 m (1,270 ft)

Population (2011)
  - Total: 63,798

Languages
  - Official: Tamil
- Time zone: UTC+5:30 (IST)
- PIN: 635601, 635602
- Telephone code: 04179
- Vehicle registration: TN-83
- Nearest city: Vellore (90 km), Salem (108 km) & Bangalore (130 km)
- Sex ratio: 993 ♂/♀
- Lok Sabha constituency: Thiruvannamalai
- Legislative Assembly constituency: Tirupathur
- Website: Tirupathur

Tirupathur taluk is a taluk in Tirupathur district of the Indian state of Tamil Nadu. The headquarters of the taluk is the town of Tirupathur. It is known as the "Sandalwood Town" due to the abundant availability of sandalwood trees in the surrounding hills. On 15 August 2019, Chief Minister of Tamil Nadu, Edapaadi K. Palanisami announced Tirupathur district, as a new district of Tamil Nadu.

== Population ==
In the 2001 Indian census, the taluk of Tirupathur had a population of 50,455 with 23,656 males and 22,799 females. There were 973 women for every 1,000 men. The taluk had a literacy rate of 66.07%. The total number of households was 111,192.

In the 2011 census, Tirupathur taluk had a population of 67,396.

Tirupathur is a town located in Tirupathur district, India, which is one of the oldest towns in Tamil Nadu. It is located approximately 40 km from Krishnagiri, 85 km from Hosur, 85 km from Thiruvannamalai and 125 km from Bangalore. The town has mainly small-scale industries and mills. It is an important commercial center from time immemorial (whereas Vaniyambadi and Ambur, which were once smaller towns, have recently flourished). It was a revenue subdivision during British raj and remains so. It has Old Shiva, Vishnu temples and Tanks (Big Tank & Small Tank) built during the Hoysala Dynasty. It is well connected by road and rail to other important cities of Tamil Nadu such as Thiruvannamalai, Chennai, Salem, Coimbatore and Vellore and to Bangalore in Karnataka. This town is also famous in Islamic religious circles as many great saints "Awliyas" had made it their hometown. Some of them are buried at various places in the town, including Syed Sha Mohammed alias Syed Khawja Meeran Hussaini Jaffari, Syed ShaAmeenuddin Hussaini Chisty ur Kahdri (who is better known as Munshi Hazrath); he was the last among a series of saints who have lived and have been buried at Tirupathur.

The name Tirupathur means a group of ten villages/small towns. There exists a village called Aathiyur (Aathi means Begin) in the southern fringes of the Town and Kodiyur (Kodi means End) in the northern fringes of the town. It is surrounded by several of these villages, making Tirupathur a Taluk. Tirupathur's population and land area are good enough to have political representations in the state legislature of Tamil Nadu (Member of the Legislative Assembly), and part of Thiruvannamalai constituency for the central/federal legislature of India (Member of Parliament as of 2009 elections). Tirupathur Municipality Tirupathur Municipality was constituted as a third-grade municipality in the year 1886. As per G.O. No. 194, date: 10.02.1970, classified as Second Grade Municipality. At present from 1.4.1977 onwards as per G.O. No. 654, classified as first grade municipality.

== Demographics ==
In the 2001 Indian census, Tirupathur had a population of 60,803. Males constituted 51% of the population and females 49%. Tirupathur had an average literacy rate of 73%, significantly higher than the national average of 59.5%: male literacy was 79%, and female literacy was 67%. In 2001 in Tirupathur, 11% of the population was under 6 years of age.

In the 2011 census, the city of Tirupathur had a population of 63,798. Males constituted 51% of the population and females 49%. Tirupathur had an average literacy rate of 78%, significantly higher than the national average of 59.5%: male literacy was 80%, and female literacy was 76%. In 2011 in Tirupathur, 11% of the population was under 6 years of age.

== Geography ==
It is known as the "Sandalwood Town" due to the abundant availability of sandalwood trees in the surrounding hills. It is very close to the 4th major hill station of Tamil Nadu, the Yelagiri hills, which is also known as the Poor man's Ooty. The town is at an average elevation of 388 m.

== Economy ==
This area is very famous for sandalwood. It claims to be the second biggest depot in Asia. The main businesses is goldsmithing and selling raw products.

== Location of Tirupathur ==
The strategic location of this town is such that the town acts as an "urban magnet" to radius of 20 to 25 km all-round. Nearly 200 villages are mainly depending on this town for all their urban needs. The growth is dominated by wholesale agriculture production and Sandalwood. The Urban Municipal town spreads over an extent of 9.26 km^{2}; this is a class-I town in Vellore District; is based on population range; floating population is increasing day by day.

== Infrastructure ==
The Tirupathur town has 56.059 km length of roads and the municipality is maintaining 'B' Grade Bus stand in the heart of the town. There is a century old municipal market having 413 shops which helps in promoting commercial and economic activities of the town.

== Climate ==
The town is known for recording coldest temperature in the Tamil Nadu plains during winter. The seasonal climate conditions are moderate and the weather is uniformly salubrious. The town experiences hot summers and cool winters.

The town gets its majority of rainfall during the southwest monsoon period. September and October are the wettest months with around 400 mm of rain being received in these two months. The town also experiences fairly frequent thunderstorms in late April and May, which gives necessary relief from the heat, along with the dip in night temperatures. The warmest nights are in May, when the town has an average minimum temperature of 23.4 °C. The coldest nights are in January, when the average minimum temperatures drop to 16.1 °C. May is the hottest month with an average maximum of 37.0 °C.

The highest ever temperature recorded in the town is 46.3 °C on 7 May 1976. The lowest ever recorded temperature is 10.2 °C on 15 December 1974. The highest 24‑hour precipitation is 167.3mm received on 4 November 1966. The average annual rainfall being received in the town is 982 mm.

Climate data for Tirupathur (1951–2012)
Month	Jan	Feb	Mar	Apr	May	Jun	Jul	Aug	Sep	Oct	Nov	Dec	Year
Record high °C (°F)	35.6 (96.1)	39.4 (102.9)	41.2 (106.2)	45.8 (114.4)	46.3 (115.3)	41.8 (107.2)	39.6 (103.3)	39.3 (102.7)	40.0 (104.0)	37.1 (98.8)	36.3 (97.3)	34.3 (93.7)	46.3 (115.3)
Mean daily maximum °C (°F)	29.6 (85.3)	32.3 (90.1)	34.9 (94.8)	36.3 (97.3)	37.0 (98.6)	34.8 (94.6)	33.2 (91.8)	33.4 (92.1)	32.9 (91.2)	31.5 (88.7)	29.9 (85.8)	29.0 (84.2)	32.9 (91.2)
Mean daily minimum °C (°F)	16.1 (61.0)	18.3 (64.9)	20.4 (68.7)	22.6 (72.7)	23.4 (74.1)	23.1 (73.6)	22.9 (73.2)	22.9 (73.2)	22.6 (72.7)	21.9 (71.4)	19.8 (67.6)	17.2 (63.0)	20.9 (69.7)
Record low °C (°F)	10.3 (50.5)	10.5 (50.9)	12.8 (55.0)	16.6 (61.9)	18.3 (64.9)	19.1 (66.4)	18.4 (65.1)	17.0 (62.6)	14.6 (58.3)	15.5 (59.9)	12.1 (53.8)	10.2 (50.4)	10.2 (50.4)
Average precipitation mm (inches)	1.3 (0.05)	4.3 (0.17)	8.3 (0.33)	22.0 (0.87)	103.8 (4.09)	58.5 (2.30)	124.3 (4.89)	132.4 (5.21)	192.5 (7.58)	190.2 (7.49)	101.8 (4.01)	42.1 (1.66)	981.5 (38.64)
Average precipitation days	0.1	0.3	0.5	1.6	5.0	3.1	5.5	5.6	7.9	8.0	4.7	1.7	44
Source: India Meteorological Department,

Nature of soil The major group of soils that are found in the town are black and red varieties. The red soil constitutes 90% while black soil only 10%.

== Historical moments ==
Tirupattur is called as the "Sandal City", "Sandal Kingdom". Even a rough estimation cannot easily be established on the origin of Tirupathur town, owing to its antiquity.

Tirupattur is known for having the FIRST FEMALE IAS OFFICER in India, Anna Rajam Malhotra, who was posted as the Sub Collector of Tirupattur in Madras State, becoming the first woman to do so. The Collector office is currently serving the nation as the Tirupathur railway junction and railway residence.

Through, the inscriptions, so far surveyed by Archaeological Survey of India in Tirupathur, it is estimated that this town is more than 1600 years old. During the regimes of various rulers like Cholas, Vijaya Nagara dynasty, Hoysalas the town had been referred to, by the following names: Sri Mathava Chaturvedi Mangalam, Veera Narayana Chaturvedi Mangalam, Tiruperur and Brahmapuram (Brahmeeswaram). The present name "Tirupathur" might have got derived from "Tiruperur". Erstwhile "Tiruperur" or "Sri Madhava Chaturvedi Mangalam" was in "Eyyil Nadu", subdivision of "Nigarili Chola Mandalam", division of "Chola Empire".

There existed a fort in the eastern part of the town around 800 years ago. Its entrance might have been near the Kottai Darwaja Sri Veera Anjaneyar Temple, since the word "Kottai" in Tamil means "Fort", and the word "Darwaja" in Hindi/Urdu means "Gate" or "Door". The area is still known as "Kottai"(fort).

The town was ruled by Cholas, Pallavas, Hoysalas, Vijaya Nagara rulers, Vallala Maharajan, Sambuvarayars, Tipu, Nawabs of Arcot and undoubtedly by the British.

== Roadways ==
- The Tamil Nadu state Bus transport corporation (TNSTC) is providing 85% of transport facilities to this town.
- Tirupathur is well connected by road and rail to major cities of India. Regarding transportation linkage.
- The highway (NH 46) from Chennai to Krishnagiri (via) Natrampalli passes through the outskirts of the town.
- The town is separated by a distance with Chennai (225 km).
- Bangalore (130 km), Vellore (87 km) and Salem (108 km).
- Several State Highways connect the town from Dharmapuri (60 km), Krishnagiri (40 km) Vaniyambadi (22 km) and Salem (108 km) section.
- TNSTC also operates luxury Volvo A/C buses (Route no:502B) to Chennai daily.
- Frequent buses are there to Chennai, Vellore, Salem, Bangalore, Villupuram.

== Railways ==
Tirupathur railway station is under the administrative control of the Southern Railways. It is 2 km away from bus stand. Traveling north, Jolarpettai Junction (8 km) is the nearest junction and going south-west, Samalpatti is the next station. Due to proximity to the Jolarpet railway junction only few express trains halt here.

The Yelagiri Express runs from Jolarpettai to Chennai every day.

The West Coast Express (Mangalore–Chennai Central–Manglore) stops at Tiruppattur railway station every day. The other trains that stop at Tirupathur station are:

- Yercaud Express – Daily
- Bangalore–Kanyakumari Express – Daily
- West Coast Express – Daily
- Dhanbad–Allepey Express – Daily
- Erode–Jolarpettai Passenger
- Katpadi–Salem Passenger
- Nagercoil–Chennai Central Express-only Monday
- Nagercoil–Mumbai CST Express – except Thursday, Saturday, Sunday
- Ernakulam Junction–Yeshwantpur Express – only Tuesday
- Ernakulam Junction–Bangalore Superfast Express – only Monday and Wednesday
- Trivandrum Central–Bangalore City Junction Express – only on Thursday
- Trivandrum Central–Mumbai CST Express – only Saturday
- Coimbatore–Rajkot Express – only Friday
- Trivandrum Central–Bangalore City Junction Superfast Express – only Sunday

== Air ==
The nearest airports:

Domestic:

- Salem (105 km)
- Vellore Air Strip (85 km)

International:

- Bengaluru (135 km)
- Chennai (225 km)

== Schools ==
=== CBSE Schools ===
- Don Bosco School of Excellence
- Shri Nandanam International
- Vijay Vidhyalaya CBSE School.
- Green Valley Public School
- Shri Ramesh CBSE international school
- Vailankanni public school

=== Elementary schools ===
- Our Lady's School.
- Vivekananda Aided Elementary School
- TMS Aided Elementary School
- Government Garden Aided Elementary School

=== Higher Secondary Schools ===
- Don Bosco Matriculation higher secondary school
- Our Lady's Nursery and Primary School
- Dominic Savio Higher Secondary School
- Mary Immaculate Higher Secondary School
- Shepherds Matriculation Higher Secondary School
- C.S.I Girls Matriculation Higher Secondary School
- YMCA Brown Matriculation Higher Secondary School
- Holy Cross Matriculation Higher Secondary School
- Ramakrishna Higher Secondary School
- Shri Amrita Higher Secondary School
- Ubaibas Girls Higher Secondary School
- TMS Higher Secondary School
- Good Will Matriculation Higher Secondary School
- I.V.N Govt Higher Secondary School
- St. Charles Matriculation Higher Secondary School
- Lions Matriculation Higher Secondary School
- Al-Ameen Matriculation Higher Secondary School
- Osmania Higher Secondary School
- Meenakshi Government Girls Higher Secondary School
- Government Boys Higher Secondary School
- Government Garden High School
- RamaKrishna Vidhyalaya Matriculation Higher Secondary School
- Vijayashanthi Vidyalaya Matriculation Higher Secondary School
- Lingannamani Matriculation Higher Secondary School
- Dewan Mohammed Memorial Matriculation Higher Secondary School
- Pudupet Higher Secondary School
- Government Higher Secondary School ANDIYAPPANUR

== Music Academy ==
- The Joyful Noise Music Academy

== Colleges ==
=== Arts Colleges ===
- Sacred Heart College (Autonomous) (Don Bosco Institution) - Ranked "A+" Grade (CGPA of 3.31/4)
- Holy Cross Arts and Science College for Women
- Don Bosco Arts and Science College, Yellagiri Hills
- Tirupattur Arts and Science College
- Marappan Lakshmiammal Arts And Science College
- Government College of Arts and Science
- Vannavil Arts and Science College
- Yelagiri Arts and Science College
- Islamiah college (Autonomous), Vaniyambadi.

=== BEd Colleges ===
- Amrita College of Education
- Amritalaya College of Education
- Dr. David Raja and Dr. Chandraleka College of Education
- G.P. Secondary Teacher Education Training College
- Sri Kalaimagal College of Education
- St. Joseph Women's College of Education
- T.K. Raja College of Education
- Thirumal College of Education
- TES Teacher Training Institute

=== Nursing College ===
- Jeya Nursing College, Tirupathur

=== Polytechnic ===
- Tirupattur Polytechnic College
- Pandian Polytechnic College
- G.P Polytechnic College
- Sri Nandhanam Polytechnic College
- Sri Padmam Polytechnic College
- Kamaraj Polytechnic College
- Government Polytechnic College

=== Engineering Colleges ===
- Sri Nandhanam College of Engineering & Technology
- Sri Nandhanam Maritime Academy
- Podhygai College of Engineering & Technology
- Bharathidasan Engineering college

=== Teacher Training Institutes ===
- Mary Immaculate Teacher Training Institute
- Shri Amrita Teacher Training Institute
- Tirupattur Teacher Training Institute
- G.Ponnusamy Teacher Training Institute
- Sri Padmam Teacher Training Institute
- TES Teacher Training Institute, Jayapuram
- Dr. David Raja Teacher Training Institute, Vengalapuram

=== Computer Institutes ===
- Bosco Integrated Computing Service
- Nirmal Multi-Tech Industries
- Aptech Computer Education
- Anugraha Computer Center
- CRN computer Education
- SRM Infotec.

== Politics ==
Tirupathur assembly constituency is part of Tiruvannamalai (Lok Sabha constituency).

Municipal Chairman S Arasu M.A, MEd
