= Natrampalli =

- Town
- Location in Tamil Nadu, India
- Coordinates: 12.59°N 78.55°E
- Country: India
- State: Tamil Nadu
- District: Tirupattur district
- Elevation: 196 m (643 ft)

Population (2001)
  - Total: 9,076

Languages
  - Official: Tamil
- Time zone: UTC+5:30 (IST)
- PIN: 635852
- Telephone code: 04179
- Vehicle registration: TN-83
- Nearest city: Tirupattur
- Lok Sabha constituency: Thiruvannamalai
- Vidhan Sabha constituency: Jolarpet

Natrampalli is a selection grade panchayat town and Taluk in Tirupattur district in the Indian state of Tamil Nadu. The Natrampalli block is a revenue block in the Tirupattur district of Tamil Nadu, India.

== Demographics ==
As of 2001 India census, Natrampalli had a population of 9,076. Males constitute 49% of the population and females 51%. Natrampalli has an average literacy rate of 71%, higher than the national average of 59.5%: male literacy is 77%, and female literacy is 64%. In Natrampalli, 12% of the population is under 6 years of age.

== Politics ==
- State assembly constituency (Jolarpettai).
- Natrampalli assembly constituency is part of Tiruvannamalai (Lok Sabha constituency).
