= Vaniyappara =

Vaniyappara Vaniyappara
- Interactive map of Vaniyappara
- Coordinates: 12.04702°N 75.75571°E
- Country: India
- State: Kerala
- District: Kannur
- Time zone: UTC+5:25 (IST)
- PIN: 670706
- Telephone code: 0490
- Vehicle registration: KL-13

Vaniyappara is a small town surrounded by hills located at ayyankunnu grama panchayath in Kannur district in the state of Kerala, India. This is a naturally beautiful area with forests and streams.

== Demography ==
The population is mainly Travancore migrated people, and the town is surrounded by the hills of Western Ghats, located around 16 km from Iritty and 60 km from both the cities Kannur and Thalassery, in the state of Kerala, India. The place belongs to Ayyankunnu Grama Panchayat.

== Economy ==
The town's economy is based on agriculture such as rubber, coconut, and cashews. People in the area are mainly depending on these agricultural items.

== Churches and schools ==
This is a multicultural area. There are churches and temples close by, also schools and primary health centres. There is one catholic church and a Pentecostal church of the Assemblies of God in India.

== Transport ==
The national highway passes through Kannur town. Mangalore and Mumbai can be accessed towards the north and Cochin and Thiruvananthapuram can be accessed towards the south. The road to the east of Iritty connects to Mysore and Bangalore. The nearest railway stations are Kannur on Mangalore-Palakkad line. There is an opening awaited airport 30 km away at Mattannur. The other easily accessible airports include, Mangalore, Calicut, Cochin and Bangalore.
