= Jolarpet block =

The Jolarpet block is a revenue block in the Tirupattur district of Tamil Nadu, India. It has a total of 36 panchayat villages.
