= Jawadhu Hills block =

Coordinates: 12.4081799°N 78.7227582°E

The Jawadhu Hills block is a revenue block in the Tiruvannamalai district of Tamil Nadu, India. It has a total of 11 panchayat villages. Its altitude is 1,543 metres.
