= Tirupattur =

Town and district headquarters in Tamil Nadu, India

Tirupattur திருப்பத்தூர்
- Town
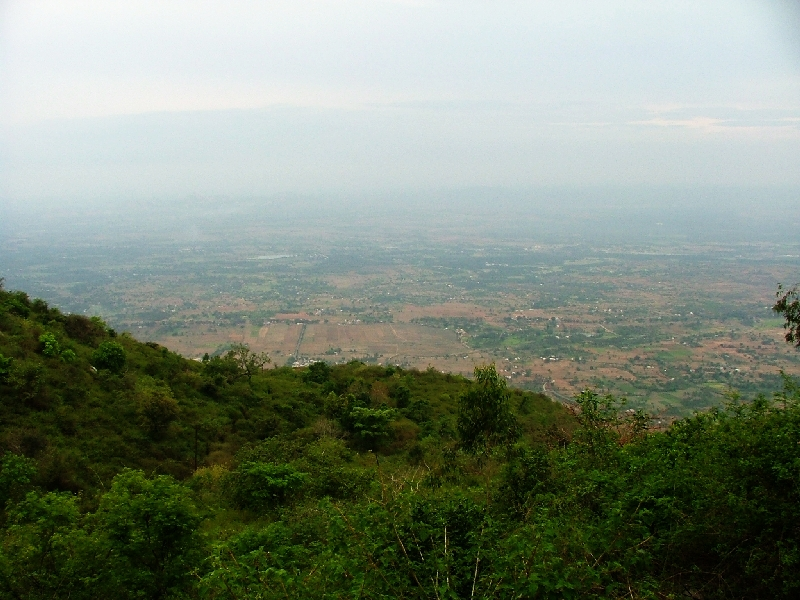
- View towards Tirupattur from Yelagiri

- Location in Tamil Nadu Location in India
- Coordinates: 12.49266°N 78.56808°E
- Country: India
- State: Tamil Nadu
- District: Tirupathur
- Taluk: Tirupattur
- Municipality constituted: 1886
- Second-grade municipality: 10 February 1970
- First-grade municipality: 1 April 1977
- Selection-grade municipality: 2 December 2008
- Wards: 36

Government
  - Type: Selection-grade municipality
  - Body: Tirupattur Municipality
  - Chairperson: V. Sangeetha
  - Vice-Chairperson: A. R. Shafiullha
  - Municipal Commissioner: S. Santhi

Area
  - Total: 9.79 km^{2} (3.78 sq mi)
- Elevation: 384 m (1,260 ft)

Population (2011)
  - Total: 83,612
  - Density: 8,540/km^{2} (22,100/sq mi)

Languages
  - Official: Tamil
- Time zone: UTC+05:30 (IST)
- PIN: 635601, 635602
- Telephone code: 04179
- Vehicle registration: TN-83MA
- Lok Sabha constituency: Tiruvannamalai
- Assembly constituency: Tiruppattur (No. 50)
- Website: tirupathur.nic.in

Tirupathur or Tirupattur is a town in Tirupathur district in the state of Tamil Nadu in India and is one of the oldest inhabited places in the state, with a history of over 1,600 years. The town is known for an abundance of sandalwood in the surrounding hills. It is located about 89 km (55 mi) from Vellore, 85 km (53 mi) from Hosur, 60 km (37 mi) from Dharmapuri, 50 km (31 mi) from Krishnagiri, 50 km (31 mi) from Thiruvannamalai, 279 km (173 mi) from coimbatore, 210 km (130 mi) from Chennai, and 125 km (78 mi) from Bangalore.

== History ==
Tirupattur has a documented history extending from the medieval period to its development as an administrative centre under British rule and, subsequently, as a municipal and district headquarters. Inscriptions associated with the region record several historical names for the settlement, while nineteenth-century accounts document its position on an established inland route between Vaniyambadi and the interior of the Salem region. During the colonial period, the town acquired administrative importance and was later constituted as a municipality in 1886. Since 2019 it has served as the headquarters of Tirupathur district.

=== Early and medieval history ===
The antiquity of the settlement has been associated with inscriptions recorded in and around Tirupattur. The town has been referred to by a number of historical names, including Sri Madhava Chaturvedi Mangalam, Veera Narayana Chaturvedi Mangalam, Tiruperur, Brahmapuram and Brahmeeswaram. These names have been associated with periods of rule under the Cholas, Hoysalas, and Vijayanagara Empire.

A local explanation preserved by the district administration associates the present name with ten shrines situated around the settlements of Aathiyur and Kotiyur. The same administrative account records earlier forms including Brahmapuram, Thiruporur and Thiruvanapuram, and states that the name Tirupathur was in use during the Vijayanagara period.

Historical names associated with Tirupattur
Historical name	Period or association	Remarks
Sri Madhava Chaturvedi Mangalam	Medieval period	Recorded as an earlier name of the settlement.
Veera Narayana Chaturvedi Mangalam	Medieval period	Recorded among the historical names associated with the settlement.
Tiruperur	Medieval period	Earlier name associated with Tirupattur.
Brahmapuram	Medieval period	Recorded among the earlier names of the settlement.
Brahmeeswaram	Medieval period	Recorded among the earlier names of the settlement.
Thiruvanapuram	Vijayanagara period	Recorded among the historical names preceding the modern form Tirupattur.

=== Colonial and military period ===
By the late eighteenth century, Tirupattur had acquired administrative importance under the East India Company. Following the establishment of Company authority in the region, Alexander Read, the first Collector associated with the district administration, established his headquarters at Tirupattur in 1792. The town consequently served as an early administrative centre of the territory that was later organised as Salem district.

Military memoirs from the beginning of the nineteenth century contain two references to places rendered as Trippatore and Tripatoor. In 1801, during operations connected with the Polygar Wars, Colonel James Welsh recorded an old fortified position called the Fort of Trippatore. On 27 August a detachment under Major Sheppard reached the place after a fourteen-mile march while assisting a force commanded by Lieutenant-Colonel James Innes. On the following day the detachment was ordered to return rapidly and secure the fort before opposing forces could occupy it, after which troops were encamped within and around the position.

The identification of this 1801 Trippatore with the present town is not established by Welsh's account itself. The episode occurred during operations centred on the Sherewele jungle and associated supply routes, and the spelling alone is insufficient to establish geographical identity.

A more securely identifiable reference occurs in Welsh's account of a journey undertaken in February 1824. After leaving Vellore for Travancore, the recorded itinerary passed through Vaniyambadi and then Tripatoor, before continuing towards Muttoor and Dharmapuri. This geographical sequence corresponds with Tirupattur's position on the inland route south-west of Vaniyambadi.

Tripatoor was reached after a fifteen-mile stage. A travelling bungalow was recorded at the settlement, together with a stone-built pond containing an island and surrounded by peepul trees. The road was reported to have been reasonably passable on foot but comparatively poor for wheeled carriage. The description provides an early nineteenth-century record of the town as a recognised stopping point on the route between Vaniyambadi and the Salem interior.

Nineteenth- and early twentieth-century records of Tirupattur
Date	Recorded name	Context	Historical record	Identification
27–28 August 1801	Trippatore	Poligar War	An old fort was occupied during military operations connected with the movement and protection of supplies.	Identification with present-day Tirupattur remains uncertain.
6 February 1824	Tripatoor	Vellore–Travancore route	The settlement was recorded as a stopping place between Vaniyambadi and Muttoor. A bungalow and a stone-built pond containing an island were also noted.	The recorded itinerary is consistent with present-day Tirupattur.
1908	Tiruppattur	Imperial Gazetteer of India	The town was recorded as an administrative station on the south-western route from Madras.	Present-day Tirupattur.

=== Modern administrative history ===
The town continued to develop as a local administrative centre during the later colonial period. A municipality was constituted in 1886 as a third-grade municipality. It was upgraded to second grade in 1970 under Government Order No. 194 and to first grade with effect from 1 April 1977 under Government Order No. 654.

A further reclassification was made in December 2008, when Tirupattur was upgraded to a selection-grade municipality under Government Order No. 283 of the Municipal Administration and Water Supply Department.

Administratively, Tirupattur subsequently formed part of Vellore district. In 2019 the former district was divided to create the new districts of Tirupathur and Ranipet, while a reduced Vellore district was retained. The creation of Tirupathur district was formally provided for in Government Order (Ms) No. 430 of the Revenue and Disaster Management Department, dated 12 November 2019, with Tirupattur designated as the district headquarters. The new district administration was formally inaugurated later that month.

Administrative development of Tirupattur
Year	Administrative development	Status or significance
1792	Early district headquarters	Alexander Read established his headquarters at Tirupattur during the early organisation of East India Company administration.
1886	Municipality constituted	Tirupattur was constituted as a third-grade municipality.
1970	Municipal reclassification	Upgraded to second-grade municipality under Government Order No. 194.
1 April 1977	Municipal reclassification	Upgraded to first-grade municipality under Government Order No. 654.
2008	Municipal reclassification	Upgraded to selection-grade municipality.
12 November 2019	Tirupathur district created	Tirupattur became the headquarters of the newly created Tirupathur district.

== Geography ==
Tirupathur is called "Sandalwood Town" due to the abundance of sandalwood trees in the surrounding hills. It is very close to the Yelagiri hills, a major hill station of Tamil Nadu. The town is at an average elevation of 388 m (1,273 ft). The Jawadhu Hills, a part of the eastern ghats, are to the east of Tirupathur. The major group of soils found in the town are black (10 percent) and red (90 varieties). Tirupathur town has 56.059 km (34.833 mi) of roads.

=== Climate ===
Tirupathur is known for recording the coolest temperature in the Tamil Nadu plains during winter. The seasonal climate conditions are moderate and the weather is uniformly salubrious. The town experiences sweltering summers and warm winters. The town gets the majority of its rainfall during the south west monsoon period. September and October are the wettest months with around 400 mm (16 in) of rain. The town also experiences fairly frequent thunderstorms in late April and May, which gives necessary relief from the heat, along with a dip in night temperatures. The warmest nights are in May, when the town has an average minimum temperature of 23.4 °C (74.1 °F). The coldest nights are in January, when the average minimum temperatures drop to 16.1 °C (61.0 °F). May is the hottest month with an average maximum of 37.0 °C (98.6 °F). The highest ever temperature recorded in the town is 46.3 °C (115.3 °F) on 7 May 1976. The lowest ever recorded temperature is 10.2 °C (50.4 °F) on 15 December 1974. The highest 24‑hour precipitation is 167.3 mm (6.59 in) received on 4 November 1966. The average annual rainfall being received in the town is 877 mm (34.5 in). The climate is classified as tropical. In winter, there is much less rainfall than in summer. This climate is considered to be a tropical savanna climate (Aw according to the Köppen–Geiger climate classification).

Climate data for Tirupathur (1991–2020, extremes 1958–2012)
Month	Jan	Feb	Mar	Apr	May	Jun	Jul	Aug	Sep	Oct	Nov	Dec	Year
Record high °C (°F)	35.6 (96.1)	39.4 (102.9)	41.2 (106.2)	45.8 (114.4)	46.3 (115.3)	41.8 (107.2)	39.6 (103.3)	39.3 (102.7)	40.0 (104.0)	37.1 (98.8)	36.3 (97.3)	35.0 (95.0)	46.3 (115.3)
Mean daily maximum °C (°F)	30.3 (86.5)	33.3 (91.9)	36.6 (97.9)	37.3 (99.1)	37.5 (99.5)	35.3 (95.5)	34.1 (93.4)	33.1 (91.6)	32.8 (91.0)	30.9 (87.6)	29.3 (84.7)	28.6 (83.5)	33.2 (91.8)
Mean daily minimum °C (°F)	17.3 (63.1)	18.6 (65.5)	20.9 (69.6)	24.1 (75.4)	25.1 (77.2)	24.6 (76.3)	24.1 (75.4)	23.4 (74.1)	23.0 (73.4)	22.0 (71.6)	20.4 (68.7)	18.0 (64.4)	21.8 (71.2)
Record low °C (°F)	10.3 (50.5)	10.5 (50.9)	12.8 (55.0)	16.6 (61.9)	18.3 (64.9)	19.1 (66.4)	18.4 (65.1)	17.0 (62.6)	14.6 (58.3)	15.5 (59.9)	12.0 (53.6)	10.2 (50.4)	10.2 (50.4)
Average rainfall mm (inches)	0.3 (0.01)	2.7 (0.11)	7.3 (0.29)	40.9 (1.61)	85.9 (3.38)	65.8 (2.59)	72.7 (2.86)	136.5 (5.37)	146.5 (5.77)	157.1 (6.19)	96.6 (3.80)	34.8 (1.37)	847.1 (33.35)
Average rainy days	0.0	0.2	0.7	3.0	5.6	3.9	4.2	6.0	7.8	9.7	5.7	2.2	49
Average relative humidity (%) (at 17:30 IST)	60	51	43	53	55	57	61	64	66	76	74	70	61
Source: India Meteorological Department

== Demographics ==
Religious census
Religion	Percent(%)
Hindu	81.93%
Muslim	16.39%
Christian	1.52%
Sikh	0.01%
Buddhist	0.01%
Jain	0.47%
Other	0.26%
No religion	0.0%

According to 2011 census, Tirupathur had a population of 83,612 with a sex-ratio of 1,010 females for every 1,000 males, much above the national average of 929. A total of 7,255 were under the age of six, constituting 3,717 males and 3,538 females. Scheduled Castes and Scheduled Tribes accounted for 18.33% and 0.43% of the population respectively. The average literacy of the town was 76.22%, compared to the national average of 72.99%. The town had a total of 14,084 households. There were a total of 22,895 workers, comprising 240 cultivators, 161 main agricultural laborers, 1,145 in household industries, 18,782 other workers, 2,567 marginal workers, 38 marginal cultivators, 27 marginal agricultural laborers, 246 marginal workers in household industries and 2,256 other marginal workers. As per the religious census of 2011, Tirupathur (M) had 81.93% Hindus, 16.39% Muslims, 1.52% Christians, 0.03% Sikhs, 0.02% Buddhists, 0.11% Jains, 0.00% following other religions and 0.01% following no religion or did not indicate any religious preference.

== Politics ==
Since 2016, Tirupattur assembly constituency is represented in the Tamil Nadu Legislative Assembly by A Nallathambi of DMK party. He was re-elected in 2021.

Tirupattur is part of Tiruvannamalai Lok Sabha constituency. The present MP (elected in 2019) of the Tiruvannamalai Lok Sabha Constituency is Annadurai.

== Places to see ==
Yelagiri is a hill station on the Vaniyambadi–Tirupathur Road, midway between Chennai and Bangalore. Located at an altitude of 1,050 m (3,440 ft) and spread across 30 km^{2} (12 sq mi), Yelagiri village (also spelt Elagiri) is surrounded by orchards, rose gardens, and valleys. Jalagambarai waterfalls the most popular waterfall in Tiruattur and Vellore district is located behind the Yellagiri Hills. The Jalagambarai falls is located 10 kms from Tirupattur town which attracts several tourists from Bengaluru and Chennai along the weekends.

The Jawadu Hills are located about 35 km (22 mi) from Tirupathur. In the middle of this hill lies the Vainu Bappu Observatory (also known as Kavalur Observatory), which has several optical and reflective telescopes run and governed by the Indian Institute of Astrophysics.

== Transport ==
The Tamil Nadu State Transport Corporation (TNSTC) provides 85% of transport facilities to this town. Tirupathur is well connected by road and rail to major cities of India. Regarding transportation linkage, the highway (NH 46) from Chennai to Krishnagiri (via) Nattrampalli passes through the town. The town is separated from Chennai (225 km [140 mi]), Bangalore (130 km [81 mi]), Vellore (87 km [54 mi]) and Salem (108 km [67 mi]). Several state highways connect the town from Dharmapuri (60 km [37 mi]), Krishnagiri (40 km [25 mi]), Vaniyambadi (22 km [14 mi]), Harur (47 km [29 mi]), and Salem (108 km [67 mi]). Frequent buses are available to Chennai, Vellore, Harur, Salem, Bangalore, and Villupuram.

The Tirupathur railway junction is under the administrative control of the Southern Railways which is the beginning boundary of Salem Railway Division. It is two km (1.2 mi) from the bus stand. To the north, Jolarpettai Junction which is one of the important railway junction in Tamil Nadu. It (8 km [5.0 mi]) is the nearest junction, and to the south-west, Morappur is the next station. Due to proximity to the Jolarpettai railway junction, only a few express trains halt here.

The nearest airports are at Salem (105 km [65 mi]) and Vellore (85 km [53 mi]), while the nearest international airports are at Bengaluru (135 km [84 mi]) and Chennai (225 km [140 mi]).
