= Tirupathur district =

- District of Tamil Nadu
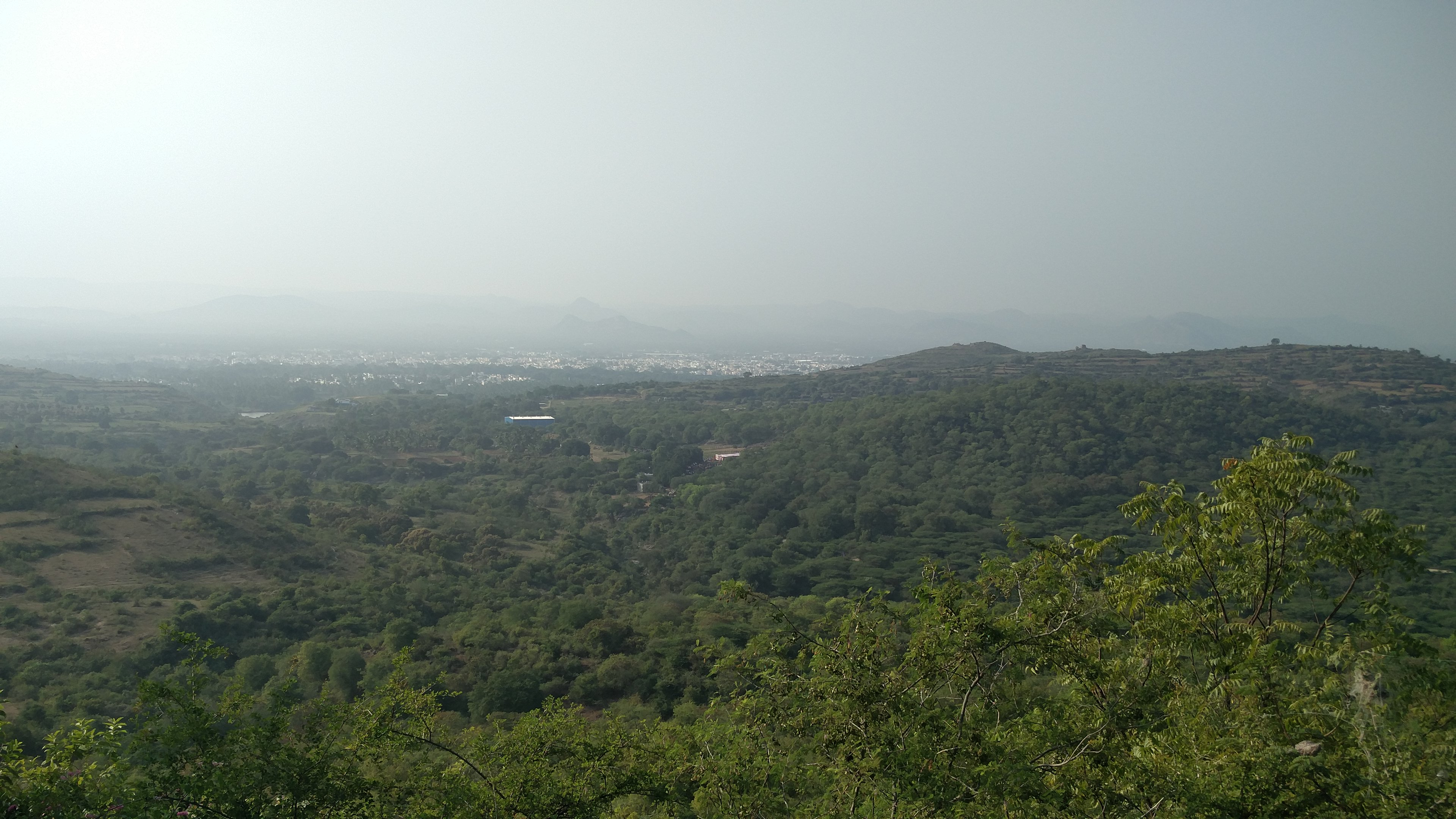
- Yelagiri Hills
- Tirupathur district Location in Tamil Nadu
- Coordinates: 12.4950° N, 78.5678° E
- Country: India
- State: Tamil Nadu
- Region: Vellore
- Established: 28 November 2019
- Founder: Edappadi K. Palaniswami
- Headquarters: Tirupathur
- Talukas: Tirupattur; Vaniyambadi; Ambur; Natrampalli

Government
  - Type: District Administration
  - Body: Tirupattur District Collectorate
  - District Collector: Mrs. Soundaravalli, IAS
  - Superintendent of Police: Shreya Gupta I.P.S., IPS

Area
  - Total: 1,797.92 km^{2} (694.18 sq mi)

Population (2011)
  - Total: 1,111,812
  - Density: 618.388/km^{2} (1,601.62/sq mi)

Languages
  - Official: Tamil
- Time zone: UTC+5:30 (IST)
- Postal code: 635601
- Vehicle registration: TN-83
- Website: tirupathur.nic.in

Tirupathur district is one of the 38 districts in the southern Indian state of Tamil Nadu. The district was formed in 2019 by the division of Vellore district into three smaller districts. Its creation alongside Ranipet district was announced on 15 August 2019, and it was officially declared on 28 November 2019. The town of Thiruppathur serves as the district headquarters.

== Geography ==
The district is bordered by Vellore district to the northeast, Krishnagiri district to the southwest, Thiruvannamalai district to the southeast, and the Chittoor district of Andhra Pradesh to the northwest. National Highway 48 passes through the district.

== Administrative Divisions ==
Tirupattur district was created by the splitting off of the three southwestern taluks of Vellore district: Thirupathur, Vaniyambadi, and Ambur. The district now includes Naatrampalli for a total of four taluks.

=== Revenue Divisions and Taluks ===
Thirupathur Revenue Division: Thirupathur, Natrampalli

Vaniyambadi Revenue Division: Vaniyambadi, Ambur

Proposed Taluks: Jolarpettai, Alangayam

=== Municipalities ===
1. Thirupathur
2. Jolarpettai
3. Vaniyambadi
4. Ambur

Proposed Municipalities: Naatrampalli, Alangayam

=== Town Panchayats ===
1. Natrampalli
2. Alangayam
3. Uthayendram

Proposed Town Panchayats: Kandhili, Madhanur, Jaffrabad, Thuthipattu, Kailasagiri, Pachchal, Valayambattu

=== Panchayat Unions / Blocks ===
- Kandhili
- Thirupathur
- Jolarpettai
- Naatrampalli
- Alangayam
- Madhanur

== Politics ==
Thirupathur, Vellore Assembly constituency is the assembly constituency. Since 2016 Thirupathur, Vellore Assembly constituency is represented in the Tamil Nadu Legislative Assembly by A Nallathambi of DMK party. He was reelected in 2021.

District	No.	Constituency	Name	Party	Alliance	Remarks
Tirupathur	47	Vaniyambadi	Syed Farooq Basha	IUML	TVK+	Won as SPA candidate, switched to TVK+ post-election
Tirupathur	48	Ambur	A. C. Vilwanathan	DMK	SPA	
Tirupathur	49	Jolarpet	K. C. Veeramani	AIADMK	AIADMK+	Supported TVK; Later declared support for EPS
Tirupathur	50	Tirupattur	N. Thirupathi	TVK	TVK+	
