= Pallavada =

PALLAVADA
- village
- Location in Tamil Nadu, India PALLAVADA (India)
- Coordinates: 13.4760733°N 80.0213538°E
- Country: India
- State: Tamil Nadu
- District: Tiruvallur
- Taluk: Gummidipoondi taluk
- Elevation: 24 m (79 ft)

Population (2011)
  - Total: 1,709
- Time zone: UTC+5:30 (IST)
- PIN: 601202
- 2011 census code: 628553

Pallavada is a village in the Tiruvallur district of Tamil Nadu, India. It is located in the Gummidipoondi taluk. Famous for festivals and celebrations.

== Economy ==
The economy of the village is driven by agricultural activities. Water melon, peanuts and rice are the most cultivated crops. As of 2016, nearly 40% of the villagers (age 6+) are illiterate, but some people have completed graduation.

== Culture ==
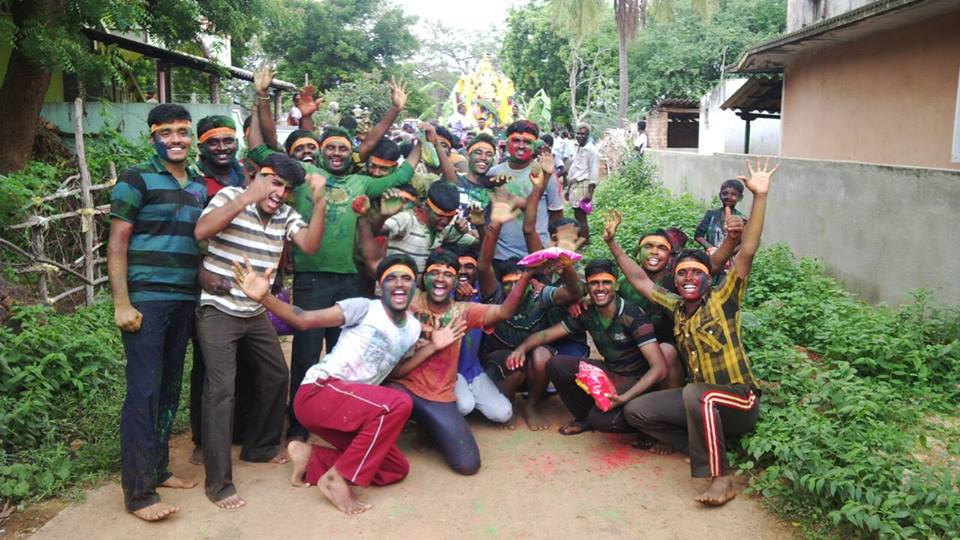
Ganesha Chaturthi celebration

The village is home to the Dharamaraja Swami temple. The 11-day annual festival of the temple attracts around 25,000 people. The village celebrates Vinayaka Chaturthi festival with music and kuttu dance. Another major festival is Pongal. Girls sing folk songs called bathukamma.

The young villagers started Pallavada anbu ullagal association in 2013, which organizes a number of events in the village and nearby areas.

Popular festivals in the village include:

- 11-day festival for lord Dharma-raja-swami temple.
- 2-day festival for lord Venkateswara temple which happens every year in the month of June.
- Vinayaka Chaturthi with kuttu dance and some other activities.
- Pongal: Girls together and enjoyed in the name of 'gobbi'. Men together and enjoyed in the name of 'kolatam'.
- Karthika deepam is celebrated in lord Siva temple.

== Transport ==
The village is connected to near by towns by bus. The Tamil Nadu government runs one bus services reaching this village. The Andhra Pradesh Government also runs one bus connecting the village to Uthukottai and Sullurupattai. Private buses are also flying in this route connected to chennai and tiruvallur. Shared auto rickshaws via Madaharpakkam to Arambakkam are also available.

== Demographics ==
The main languages spoken in the village are Tamil and Telugu.

According to the 2011 census of India, Pallavada has 512 households. The effective literacy rate (i.e. the literacy rate of population excluding children aged 6 and below) is 63.24%.

Demographics (2011 Census)
	Total	Male	Female
Population	1709	833	876
Children aged below 6 years	161	85	76
Scheduled caste	785	390	395
Scheduled tribe	103	52	51
Literates	979	540	439
Workers (all)	1038	575	463
Main workers (total)	940	566	374
Main workers: Cultivators	95	75	20
Main workers: Agricultural labourers	696	366	330
Main workers: Household industry workers	3	2	1
Main workers: Other	146	123	23
Marginal workers (total)	98	9	89
Marginal workers: Cultivators	3	0	3
Marginal workers: Agricultural labourers	67	2	65
Marginal workers: Household industry workers	0	0	0
Marginal workers: Others	28	7	21
Non-workers	671	258	413
