= Vanganoor =

Human settlement in Tamil Nadu, India

Vanganoor Vanganur (வங்கனூர்)
- Interactive map of Vanganoor
- Country: India
- State: Tamil Nadu
- District: Tiruvallur District
- Taluk: RK Pet
- State Assembly Constituency: Tiruttani
- Lok Sabha Constituency: Arakkonam

Area
  - Total: 3.87 km^{2} (1.49 sq mi)

Languages
  - Official: Tamil
  - Other Languages: [English]
- Time zone: UTC+5:30 (IST)
- Postal code: 631304
- Vehicle registration: TN – 20

Vanganoor (also spelled Vanganur) is a village in Pallipattu Taluk, Tiruvallur District, Tamil Nadu, India.

== Geography ==
The village of Vanganoor is situated between Tiruttani and Sholingur, about 10 km from Sholingur Town and 20 km from Tiruttani. In addition, it is about 20 km from Pallipattu, 40 km from Chittoor, 50 km from Tirupati city, 57 km from Tiruvallur, 3 km from RK Pet, and 101 km from the state capital Chennai. The Vanganoor Census Town has a population of 6,584, of which 3,349 are males and 3,235 are females per Census India 2011.

== Transport ==
The village is located in Tiruttai - Chittoor route. To reach Vanganoor:

Lot of trains from Chennai to Tiruttani, lots of buses from Tiruttani to Bengaluru, Vellore, Sholinghur, Ponnai, Chittoor, Pallipattu via Vanganoor

== Schools ==
- Govt. Boys Higher Secondary School
- Govt. Girls Higher Secondary School
- Vethathiri Maharishi Matriculation School
- Ayyan Matriculation School
- Sri Balaji Vidya Mandir Matriculation School
- Billa Bong CBSE School.
- Gurukulam padasalai tuition centre ( premium & traditional education) founder is N.Dhanapal. sir. D.T.Ed. B.Sc.M.Sc.in physics. Since 2011.

== Landmarks ==
- Perumal Temple (built in 600 AD)
- lord shivan temple on mountain
- Sevindiyamman temple
- Ellaiyamman temple
- Pachaiyamman temple
- Anniyamman temple
- Nagalamman temple
- Throupathiyamman temple
- Periyapalaiyathamman temple
- Murugan temple.
- Aayammal maligai kadai. Pk street East
- Rettai kunnu(Big rock) standing without balance
