= Attanthangal =

Indian State's Region

- Locality
- Location in Tamil Nadu, India Attanthangal (India)
- Coordinates: 13.19193°N 80.15087°E
- Country: India
- State: Tamil Nadu
- District: Tiruvallur
- City: Chennai
- Elevation: 12 m (39 ft)

Population (2001)
  - Total: 9,982
- Time zone: UTC+5:30 (IST)
- PIN: 600067
- Telephone code: 044

Attanthangal (அத்தாந்தங்கள்) is a locality in the Chennai North region of Chennai, Tiruvallur District, Tamil Nadu, India.

== Geography and nearby areas ==
Perungavoor, located approximately 8.96 kilometers away, is one of the nearby areas to Attanthangal. The village shares proximity with several other cities, including Kummamur, Chinnanolambur, Erumaivettipalayam R.F., Theerthagiriyampattu, Sembilivaram, Upparapalayam, Dhanduma Nagar, Bhavani Nagar, Old Erumai Vetti Palayam, Vadagarai, Nallur, New Erumai Vetti Palayam, Chennai, Vijayanallur, Pammadukulam, and Athivakkam.
