= Thiruttani division =

Thiruttani division is a revenue division in the Tiruvallur district of Tamil Nadu, India. It comprises the taluks of Thiruttani and Pallipattu.
