= Ayanambakkam =

Neighbourhood in Tiruvallur district, Tamil Nadu, India

- Locality
- Location within Chennai Location within Tamil Nadu Location within India
- Coordinates: 13°04′32″N 80°09′04″E
- Country: India
- State: Tamil Nadu
- District: Tiruvallur
- Taluk: Poonamallee
- Elevation: 15 m (49 ft)

Languages
  - Official: Tamil
- Time zone: UTC+5:30 (IST)
- PIN: 600095
- Vehicle registration: TN-09

Ayanambakkam is a rapidly developing residential neighbourhood in the Poonamallee Block of Tiruvallur District, Tamil Nadu, India. Situated approximately 14 kilometres west of central Chennai, Ayanambakkam forms a part of the city’s expanding western suburban corridor.

Its close proximity to neighbourhoods such as Vanagaram, Athipet, and Mogappair has contributed to its steady transformation into a residential hub. The locality has experienced significant growth in recent years, driven by its strategic location, improving infrastructure, and convenient access to key commercial centres.

Ayanambakkam is governed by both Greater Chennai Corporation and Avadi City Corporation.

== Geography ==
Ayanambakkam is situated to the north of Cooum River, west of Chennai - Tiruthani - Renigunta Road. Its average elevation is 15 metres above the sea level.

== Climate ==
Ayanambakkam has a Tropical Savanna Climate (As) according to the Köppen Climate Classification. It sees the most precipitation in November, with 228 mm of average rainfall; and the least precipitation in February, with 9 mm of average rainfall.

Climate data for Ayanambakkam
Month	Jan	Feb	Mar	Apr	May	Jun	Jul	Aug	Sep	Oct	Nov	Dec	Year
Mean daily maximum °C (°F)	28.0 (82.4)	30.1 (86.2)	32.7 (90.9)	34.7 (94.5)	36.7 (98.1)	35.5 (95.9)	34.3 (93.7)	33.3 (91.9)	32.6 (90.7)	30.7 (87.3)	28.6 (83.5)	27.5 (81.5)	32.1 (89.7)
Daily mean °C (°F)	24.2 (75.6)	25.3 (77.5)	27.4 (81.3)	29.7 (85.5)	31.5 (88.7)	31.0 (87.8)	30.1 (86.2)	29.3 (84.7)	28.7 (83.7)	27.3 (81.1)	25.7 (78.3)	24.6 (76.3)	27.9 (82.2)
Mean daily minimum °C (°F)	20.7 (69.3)	21.0 (69.8)	23.1 (73.6)	26.2 (79.2)	28.0 (82.4)	27.7 (81.9)	27.0 (80.6)	26.3 (79.3)	25.9 (78.6)	24.6 (76.3)	23.2 (73.8)	21.9 (71.4)	24.6 (76.3)
Average rainfall mm (inches)	17 (0.7)	9 (0.4)	11 (0.4)	18 (0.7)	48 (1.9)	68 (2.7)	70 (2.8)	99 (3.9)	110 (4.3)	223 (8.8)	228 (9.0)	113 (4.4)	1,014 (40)
Source: Climate-Data.org
