= Sennavaram =

- village
- Location in Tamil Nadu, India Sennavaram (India)
- Coordinates: 13.4612757°N 80.1526271°E
- Country: India
- State: Tamil Nadu
- District: Tiruvallur
- Taluk: Gummidipoondi taluk
- Elevation: 12 m (39 ft)

Population (2011)
  - Total: 374
- Time zone: UTC+5:30 (IST)
- 2011 census code: 628561

Sennavaram is a village in the Tiruvallur district of Tamil Nadu, India. It is located in the Gummidipoondi taluk.

This village is located 1 km from Pattupalli, 4 km from Sunnambukulam and 0.5 km from Rakkampalayam. It is located close to the Rakkampalayam lake.

== Demographics ==
According to the 2011 census of India, Sennavaram has 124 households. The effective literacy rate (i.e. the literacy rate of population excluding children aged 6 and below) is 60.12%.

Demographics (2011 Census)
	Total	Male	Female
Population	374	192	182
Children aged below 6 years	33	21	12
Scheduled caste	31	16	15
Scheduled tribe	51	25	26
Literates	205	126	79
Workers (all)	195	136	59
Main workers (total)	32	27	5
Main workers: Cultivators	2	1	1
Main workers: Agricultural labourers	0	0	0
Main workers: Household industry workers	3	3	0
Main workers: Other	27	23	4
Marginal workers (total)	163	109	54
Marginal workers: Cultivators	0	0	0
Marginal workers: Agricultural labourers	152	100	52
Marginal workers: Household industry workers	0	0	0
Marginal workers: Others	11	9	2
Non-workers	179	56	123
