= Narasampalayam =

Village or area was historically known for metalwork, or iron tool production

- village
- Location in Tamil Nadu, India Narasampalayam (India)
- Coordinates: 13.490043°N 80.136691°E
- Country: India
- State: Tamil Nadu
- District: Tiruvallur
- Taluk: Gummidipoondi taluk
- Elevation: 3 m (9.8 ft)

Population (2011)
  - Total: 362
- Time zone: UTC+5:30 (IST)
- 2011 census code: 628556

Narasampalayam is a village in the Tiruvallur district of Tamil Nadu, India. It is located in the Gummidipoondi taluk.

== Demographics ==
According to the 2011 census of India, Narasampalayam has 133 households. The effective literacy rate (i.e. the literacy rate of population excluding children aged 6 and below) is 75.33%.

Demographics (2011 Census)
	Total	Male	Female
Population	362	186	176
Children aged below 6 years	201	103	98
Scheduled caste	0	0	0
Scheduled tribe	0	0	0
Literates	236	155	81
Workers (all)	234	147	87
Main workers (total)	47	40	7
Main workers: Cultivators	2	2	0
Main workers: Agricultural labourers	163	88	75
Marginal workers (total)	5	2	3
Marginal workers: Cultivators	2	2	0
Marginal workers: Household industry workers	17	17	0
Non-workers	126	31	95
