= Peria Obulapuram =

Peria Obulapuram Periya Obulapuram, Periaobulapuram
- village
- Location in Tamil Nadu, India Peria Obulapuram (India)
- Coordinates: 13.438838°N 80.1086589°E
- Country: India
- State: Tamil Nadu
- District: Tiruvallur
- Taluk: Gummidipoondi taluk
- Elevation: 17 m (56 ft)

Population (2011)
  - Total: 2,810
- Time zone: UTC+5:30 (IST)
- 2011 census code: 628566

Peria Obulapuram is a village in the Tiruvallur district of Tamil Nadu, India. It is located in the Gummidipoondi taluk.

== Demographics ==
According to the 2011 census of India, Peria Obulapuram has 733 households. The effective literacy rate (i.e. the literacy rate of population excluding children aged 6 and below) is 68.74%.

Demographics (2011 Census)
	Total	Male	Female
Population	2810	1406	1404
Children aged below 6 years	347	168	179
Scheduled caste	587	288	299
Scheduled tribe	4	1	3
Literates	1693	994	699
Workers (all)	1213	902	311
Main workers (total)	1101	859	242
Main workers: Cultivators	286	230	56
Main workers: Agricultural labourers	380	246	134
Main workers: Household industry workers	6	3	3
Main workers: Other	429	380	49
Marginal workers (total)	112	43	69
Marginal workers: Cultivators	8	4	4
Marginal workers: Agricultural labourers	67	11	56
Marginal workers: Household industry workers	3	1	2
Marginal workers: Others	34	27	7
Non-workers	1597	504	1093
