= Chedilpakkam =

Chedilpakkam Sedhilpakkam
- village
- Location in Tamil Nadu, India Chedilpakkam (India)
- Coordinates: 13.4530378°N 79.9808143°E
- Country: India
- State: Tamil Nadu
- District: Tiruvallur
- Taluk: Gummidipoondi
- Elevation: 31 m (102 ft)

Population (2011)
  - Total: 1,369
- Time zone: UTC+5:30 (IST)
- 2011 census code: 628572

Chedilpakkam is a village in the Tiruvallur district of Tamil Nadu, India. It is located in the Gummidipoondi taluk.

== Demographics ==
According to the 2011 census of India, Chedilpakkam has 329 households. The effective literacy rate (i.e. the literacy rate of population excluding children aged 6 and below) is 61.28%.

Demographics (2011 Census)
| | Total | Male | Female |
|---|---|---|---|
| Population | 1369 | 671 | 698 |
| Children aged below 6 years | 163 | 83 | 80 |
| Scheduled caste | 724 | 346 | 378 |
| Scheduled tribe | 2 | 2 | 0 |
| Literates | 739 | 412 | 327 |
| Workers (all) | 771 | 415 | 356 |
| Main workers (total) | 765 | 412 | 353 |
| Main workers: Cultivators | 16 | 11 | 5 |
| Main workers: Agricultural labourers | 664 | 343 | 321 |
| Main workers: Household industry workers | 6 | 3 | 3 |
| Main workers: Other | 79 | 55 | 24 |
| Marginal workers (total) | 6 | 3 | 3 |
| Marginal workers: Cultivators | 3 | 1 | 2 |
| Marginal workers: Agricultural labourers | 2 | 1 | 1 |
| Marginal workers: Household industry workers | 0 | 0 | 0 |
| Marginal workers: Others | 1 | 1 | 0 |
| Non-workers | 598 | 256 | 342 |
