= Sanaputhur =

- village
- Location in Tamil Nadu, India Sanaputhur (India)
- Coordinates: 13.458015°N 80.054432°E
- Country: India
- State: Tamil Nadu
- District: Tiruvallur
- Taluk: Gummidipoondi taluk
- Elevation: 7 m (23 ft)

Population (2011)
  - Total: 2,891
- Time zone: UTC+5:30 (IST)
- 2011 census code: 628554

Sanaputhur is a village in the Tiruvallur district of Tamil Nadu, India. It is located in the Gummidipoondi taluk.

== Demographics ==
According to the 2011 census of India, Sanaputhur has 750 households. The effective literacy rate (i.e. the literacy rate of the population excluding children aged 6 and below) is 62.29%.

Demographics (2011 Census)
	Total	Male	Female
Population	2891	1473	1418
Children aged below 6 years	340	181	159
Scheduled caste	1794	916	878
Scheduled tribe	166	81	85
Literates	1589	900	689
Workers (all)	1608	877	731
Main workers (total)	1249	714	535
Main workers: Cultivators	215	137	78
Main workers: Agricultural labourers	852	433	419
Main workers: Household industry workers	7	4	3
Main workers: Other	175	140	35
Marginal workers (total)	359	163	196
Marginal workers: Cultivators	2	0	2
Marginal workers: Agricultural labourers	282	108	174
Marginal workers: Household industry workers	0	0	0
Marginal workers: Others	75	55	20
Non-workers	1283	596	687
