= Pondavakkam =

- village
- Location in Tamil Nadu, India Pondavakkam (India)
- Coordinates: 13.3152412°N 79.8884819°E
- Country: India
- State: Tamil Nadu
- District: Tiruvallur
- Taluk: Uthukottai
- Elevation: 49 m (161 ft)

Population (2011)
  - Total: 1,556
- Time zone: UTC+5:30 (IST)
- 2011 census code: 628571

Pondavakkam is a village in the Tiruvallur district of Tamil Nadu, India. It is located in the Uthukottai taluk.

== Demographics ==
According to the 2011 census of India, Pondavakkam has 401 households. The effective literacy rate (i.e. the literacy rate of population excluding children aged 6 and below) is 59.39%.

Demographics (2011 Census)
	Total	Male	Female
Population	1556	749	807
Children aged below 6 years	172	84	88
Scheduled caste	1009	497	512
Scheduled tribe	165	80	85
Literates	822	450	372
Workers (all)	639	463	176
Main workers (total)	322	226	96
Main workers: Cultivators	36	32	4
Main workers: Agricultural labourers	188	112	76
Main workers: Household industry workers	1	1	0
Main workers: Other	97	81	16
Marginal workers (total)	317	237	80
Marginal workers: Cultivators	47	45	2
Marginal workers: Agricultural labourers	234	163	71
Marginal workers: Household industry workers	2	1	1
Marginal workers: Others	34	28	6
Non-workers	917	286	631
