= Erumaivettipalayam =

Erumaivettipalayam or Erumai Vetti Palayam may refer to the following neighborhoods of Chennai, India:

- Pazhaya Erumaivettipalayam, Old Erumai Vetti Palayam
- Pudhu Erumaivettipalayam, New Erumai Vetti Palayam
