= Obasamudram =

- village
- Location in Tamil Nadu, India Obasamudram (India)
- Coordinates: 13.4804483°N 80.1679758°E
- Country: India
- State: Tamil Nadu
- District: Tiruvallur
- Taluk: Gummidipoondi taluk
- Elevation: 4 m (13 ft)

Population (2011)
  - Total: 3,127
- Time zone: UTC+5:30 (IST)
- 2011 census code: 628558

Obasamudram is a village in the Tiruvallur district of Tamil Nadu, India. It is located in the Gummidipoondi taluk.

== Demographics ==
According to the 2011 census of India, Obasamudram has 866 households. The effective literacy rate (i.e. the literacy rate of population excluding children aged 6 and below) is 56.63%.

Demographics (2011 Census)
	Total	Male	Female
Population	3127	1537	1590
Children aged below 6 years	374	181	193
Scheduled caste	297	147	150
Scheduled tribe	193	91	102
Literates	1559	895	664
Workers (all)	1604	955	649
Main workers (total)	1468	924	544
Main workers: Cultivators	63	39	24
Main workers: Agricultural labourers	526	250	276
Main workers: Household industry workers	27	22	5
Main workers: Other	852	613	239
Marginal workers (total)	136	31	105
Marginal workers: Cultivators	5	2	3
Marginal workers: Agricultural labourers	8	2	6
Marginal workers: Household industry workers	3	1	2
Marginal workers: Others	120	26	94
Non-workers	1523	582	941
