= Vellanur =

- Suburb in Avadi, Chennai
- Location in Tamil Nadu, India Vellanur (Tamil Nadu) Vellanur (India)
- Coordinates: 13.1526°N 80.1052°E
- Country: India
- State: Tamil Nadu
- District: Tiruvallur

Government
  - Body: Avadi City Municipal Corporation

Population (2011)
  - Total: 11,668

Languages
  - Official: Tamil
- Time zone: UTC+5:30 (IST)
- Postal code: 600062
- Vehicle registration: TN-20 (Tiruvallur RTO)

Vellanur is a suburb in the Avadi taluk of Tiruvallur district in Tamil Nadu. It was earlier a village panchayat near Avadi, and became one of the 17 village panchayats adjacent to Avadi, to be merged with Avadi City Municipal Corporation in 2025.

== History ==
Vellanur was a village initially part of larger Ambattur taluk, before the taluka was split into Avadi taluk and Poonamallee taluk in 2014, with Vellanur coming under Avadi taluk. The village panchayat was integrated into Avadi Corporation in 2025.

== Demographics ==
As per the 2011 census, Vellanur had a total population of 11,668 with 6353 males and 5315 females with average sex ratio of 837. Out of the total population, the literacy rate was 85.62% with 91.41% male literacy and 78.59% female literacy.
