= Manellore =

- village
- Location in Tamil Nadu, India Manellore (India)
- Coordinates: 13.4528933°N 80.0129679°E
- Country: India
- State: Tamil Nadu
- District: Tiruvallur
- Taluk: Gummidipoondi
- Elevation: 23 m (75 ft)

Population (2011)
  - Total: 4,534
- Time zone: UTC+5:30 (IST)
- PIN: 601202
- 2011 census code: 628570

Manellore is a village in the Tiruvallur district of Tamil Nadu, India. It is located in the Gummidipoondi taluk.

It was formerly known as Manyalavur. Manellore's economy has a broad agriculture & handloom base.

== Demographics ==
According to the 2011 census of India, Manellore has 1203 households. The effective literacy rate (i.e. the literacy rate of population excluding children aged 6 and below) is 74.2%.

Demographics (2011 Census)
	Total	Male	Female
Population	4534	2174	2360
Children aged below 6 years	483	223	260
Scheduled caste	1568	759	809
Scheduled tribe	381	189	192
Literates	3006	1616	1390
Workers (all)	1916	1323	593
Main workers (total)	971	808	163
Main workers: Cultivators	26	26	0
Main workers: Agricultural labourers	185	162	23
Main workers: Household industry workers	101	68	33
Main workers: Other	659	552	107
Marginal workers (total)	945	515	430
Marginal workers: Cultivators	43	39	4
Marginal workers: Agricultural labourers	612	306	306
Marginal workers: Household industry workers	62	17	45
Marginal workers: Others	228	153	75
Non-workers	2618	851	1767

== Transport ==
Distance from major places:

- Madharpakkam - 02 km
- Gummidipoondi - 16 km
- Kavaraipettai - 22 km
- Uthukottai - 22 km
- Ponneri - 38 km
- Chennai - 58 km (Road)
- Kanyakumari - 824 km (Railway)
- Gudalur (via Connoor)- 718 km (Road)
- Rameshwaram - 739 km (Railway)
- Madurai - 548 km
- Coimbatore - 562 km

Andhra Pradesh

- Satyavedu - 6 km
- Sullerpet - 35 km
- Srikalahasti - 63 km
- Puttur - 63 km
- Tirupati - 103 km

== Education ==
Primary schools:

- Panchayat Union Primary School
- CSI Primary School

Secondary schools:

- Govt.Hr.Sec School - Manellore
- Govt.Girls.High.Sec School - Manellore.

== Key Members ==
- Counselor - P.S.Gunasekar
- President - M.Lawrance
