= Azhinjivakkam =

Village in Tiruvallur, Tamil Nadu, India

- Village
- Location in Tamil Nadu, India Azhinjivakkam (India)
- Coordinates: 13.0413°N 79.8836°E
- Country: India
- State: Tamil Nadu
- District: Thiruvallur
- Taluk: Thiruvallur

Government
  - Type: Panchayat
  - Body: Sarpanch

Area
  - Total: 3.61 km^{2} (1.39 sq mi)

Population (2011)
  - Total: 650
  - Density: 180/km^{2} (470/sq mi)

Sex Ratio
  - Overall: 958 females per 1,000 males
  - Child: 1207 girls per 1,000 boys

Literacy Rate
  - Overall: 61.77%
  - Male: 69.64%
  - Female: 53.36%
- PIN: 602105

Azhinjivakkam is a village situated in the Thiruvallur taluk of Thiruvallur district, Tamil Nadu, India. The village is assigned the Census of India village code 629096 and is governed by a Sarpanch, an elected official according to the Panchayati Raj Act. The total area of the village is 361.19 hectares.

== Population ==
As per the 2011 Census, Azhinjivakkam has a population of 650, which includes 332 males and 318 females. The village has 168 households. The number of children aged 0-6 years is 64, constituting 9.85% of the total population.

== Demographics ==
The village's sex ratio is 958 females per 1,000 males, lower than the Tamil Nadu state average of 996. The child sex ratio is 1207 girls per 1,000 boys, surpassing the state average of 943.

Azhinjivakkam's literacy rate is 61.77%, which is below the Tamil Nadu state average of 80.09%. Male literacy stands at 69.64%, while female literacy is at 53.36%.
