= Narasingapuram, Thiruvallur =

Village in Tamil Nadu, India

Lakshmi Narasimhar Temple, Narasinghapuram
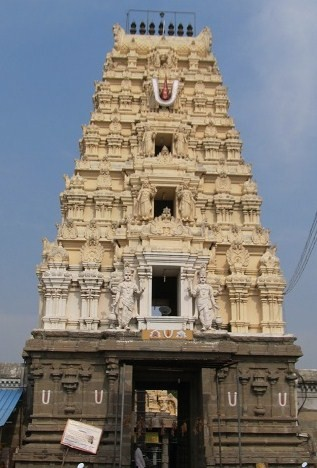

Religion
- Affiliation: Hinduism

Location
- Interactive map of Lakshmi Narasimhar Temple, Narasinghapuram
- Coordinates: 13°01′31″N 79°48′24″E

Narasingapuram (Tamil: [naɾasoŋɡabɯɾam]) is a village that belongs to the Kadambathur block of Tiruvallur district, located about 55 km from Chennai and 21 km from Arakkonam.

== Geography ==
Tiruvallur district is an administrative district in the South Indian state of Tamil Nadu. The town of Thiruvallur is the district headquarters. It is bounded on the north by Andhra Pradesh state, on the east by the Bay of Bengal, on the southeast by Chennai district, on the south by Kanchipuram and on the west by Vellore district. It occupies an area of 3,424 km^{2} (1,322 sq mi) and has a population of 2,754,756 as of 2001. It is 54.45% urbanised. The district has a literacy rate of 76.90%, higher than the state average.

In 2019 residents began protesting the water shortages. Residents blocked roads, holding up empty buckets and pots while demanding the water supply issue be resolved. In 2020 work began to replace the old pipelines, as it was found they were limiting the water supply.

== See also ==
- Lakshmi Narasimhar Temple, Narasinghapuram
