= Arakkambakkam =

Village in Tamil Nadu, India

- Village
- Location within Tamil Nadu Location within India
- Coordinates: 13°10′51″N 80°04′11″E
- Country: India
- State: Tamil Nadu
- District: Tiruvallur
- Block/Taluka: Ambattur

Area
  - Total: 1.82 km^{2} (0.70 sq mi)

Population
  - Total: 1,402
  - Density: 770/km^{2} (2,000/sq mi)

Arakkambakkam is a village located in the Ambattur block of Thiruvallur district, Tamil Nadu, India.

== Geography ==
Arakkambakkam is situated in the Ambattur region of Tamil Nadu, approximately 11 kilometers northwest of Chennai. The village covers an area of 1.82 square kilometers with a population of 1402, resulting in a population density of 770 people per square kilometer. The male and female populations are 700 and 702, respectively. The village is part of the Ambattur block in the Thiruvallur district.

=== Nearby villages ===
- Kilakondaiyur
- Alathur
- Pandeswaram
- Morai
- Melpakkam
- Kadavur
- Vellacheri
- Palavedu
- Vellanur

== Demographics ==
According to the Census of India 2011, Arakkambakkam has a population of 1402. The male and female populations are 700 and 702, respectively. The village covers an area of 1.82 square kilometers, resulting in a population density of 770 people per square kilometer. The literacy rate of Arakkambakkam is 72.18%, with 77.86% of males and 66.52% of females being literate. There are about 374 houses in Arakkambakkam.

=== Population statistics ===
Population of Arakkambakkam
Particulars	Total	Male	Female
Total Population	1,402	700	702
Literate Population	1,012	545	467
Illiterate Population	390	155	235

== Connectivity ==
Arakkambakkam has good connectivity with the following services:

=== Public Transportation ===
- Public Bus Service: Available within the village
- Private Bus Service: Available within 4 km distance
- Railway Station: Available within 11 km distance

== Administration ==
- Gram Panchayat: Arakkambakkam
- Block/Taluka: Ambattur
- District: Thiruvallur
- State: Tamil Nadu
- Pincode: 600055
- Census Code: 629162

== Nearest town ==
The nearest town to Arakkambakkam is Avadi, located 11 km away.
