= Soorapundi =

- village
- Location in Tamil Nadu, India Soorapundi (India)
- Coordinates: 13.441322°N 80.0451095°E
- Country: India
- State: Tamil Nadu
- District: Tiruvallur
- Taluk: Gummidipoondi taluk
- Elevation: 10 m (33 ft)

Population (2011)
  - Total: 1,480
- Time zone: UTC+5:30 (IST)
- 2011 census code: 628568

Soorapundi is a village in the Tiruvallur district of Tamil Nadu, India. It is located in the Gummidipoondi taluk.

== Demographics ==
According to the 2011 census of India, Soorapundi has 403 households. The effective literacy rate (i.e. the literacy rate of population excluding children aged 6 and below) is 73.64%.

Demographics (2011 Census)
	Total	Male	Female
Population	1480	740	740
Children aged below 6 years	171	85	86
Scheduled caste	746	375	371
Scheduled tribe	117	55	62
Literates	964	531	433
Workers (all)	811	432	379
Main workers (total)	182	140	42
Main workers: Cultivators	25	16	9
Main workers: Agricultural labourers	57	40	17
Main workers: Household industry workers	5	4	1
Main workers: Other	95	80	15
Marginal workers (total)	629	292	337
Marginal workers: Cultivators	3	1	2
Marginal workers: Agricultural labourers	594	268	326
Marginal workers: Household industry workers	5	1	4
Marginal workers: Others	27	22	5
Non-workers	669	308	361
