= Natham, Gummidipoondi =

Natham
- village
- Location in Tamil Nadu, India Natham (India)
- Coordinates: 13.45106599°N 80.14577866°E
- Country: India
- State: Tamil Nadu
- District: Tiruvallur
- Taluk: Gummidipoondi taluk
- Elevation: 16 m (52 ft)

Population (2011)
  - Total: 2,183
- Time zone: UTC+5:30 (IST)
- 2011 census code: 628562

Natham is a village in the Tiruvallur district of Tamil Nadu, India. It is located in the Gummidipoondi taluk. Sri Jayaram Institute of Engineering and Technology is located near this village.

== Demographics ==
According to the 2011 census of India, Natham has 626 households. The effective literacy rate (i.e. the literacy rate of population excluding children aged 6 and below) is 65.17%.

Demographics (2011 Census)
	Total	Male	Female
Population	2183	1118	1065
Children aged below 6 years	245	134	111
Scheduled caste	91	40	51
Scheduled tribe	15	8	7
Literates	1263	758	505
Workers (all)	1180	668	512
Main workers (total)	1084	619	465
Main workers: Cultivators	16	11	5
Main workers: Agricultural labourers	827	400	427
Main workers: Household industry workers	5	4	1
Main workers: Other	236	204	32
Marginal workers (total)	96	49	47
Marginal workers: Cultivators	0	0	0
Marginal workers: Agricultural labourers	37	15	22
Marginal workers: Household industry workers	6	2	4
Marginal workers: Others	53	32	21
Non-workers	1003	450	553
