= Naidukuppam =

Naidukuppam நாயுடுகுப்பம்
- village
- Location in Tamil Nadu, India Naidukuppam (India)
- Coordinates: 13.5322806°N 80.0339312°E
- Country: India
- State: Tamil Nadu
- District: Tiruvallur
- Taluk: Gummidipoondi taluk
- Elevation: 27 m (89 ft)

Population (2011)
  - Total: 706
- Time zone: UTC+5:30 (IST)
- 2011 census code: 628549

Naidukuppam is a village in the Tiruvallur district of Tamil Nadu, India. It is located in the Gummidipoondi taluk.

== Demographics ==
According to the 2011 census of India, Naidukuppam has 203 households. The effective literacy rate (i.e. the literacy rate of population excluding children aged 6 and below) is 52.15%.

Demographics (2011 Census)
	Total	Male	Female
Population	706	354	352
Children aged below 6 years	79	39	40
Scheduled caste	594	295	299
Scheduled tribe	0	0	0
Literates	327	187	140
Workers (all)	342	173	169
Main workers (total)	14	6	8
Main workers: Cultivators	0	0	0
Main workers: Agricultural labourers	3	1	2
Main workers: Household industry workers	0	0	0
Main workers: Other	11	5	6
Marginal workers (total)	328	167	161
Marginal workers: Cultivators	15	10	5
Marginal workers: Agricultural labourers	304	153	151
Marginal workers: Household industry workers	2	0	2
Marginal workers: Others	7	4	3
Non-workers	364	181	183
