= Karumbukuppam =

- village
- Location in Tamil Nadu, India Karumbukuppam (India)
- Coordinates: 13.3982871°N 80.1121493°E
- Country: India
- State: Tamil Nadu
- District: Tiruvallur
- Taluk: Gummidipoondi
- Elevation: 21 m (69 ft)

Population (2011)
  - Total: 1,457
- Time zone: UTC+5:30 (IST)
- 2011 census code: 628600

Karumbukuppam is a village in the Tiruvallur district of Tamil Nadu, India. It is located in the Gummidipoondi taluk.

== Demographics ==
According to the 2011 census of India, Karumbukuppam has 387 households. The effective literacy rate (i.e. the literacy rate of population excluding children aged 6 and below) is 65.25%.

Demographics (2011 Census)
	Total	Male	Female
Population	1457	718	739
Children aged below 6 years	182	95	87
Scheduled caste	596	288	308
Scheduled tribe	28	16	12
Literates	832	466	366
Workers (all)	694	445	249
Main workers (total)	278	229	49
Main workers: Cultivators	8	7	1
Main workers: Agricultural labourers	51	42	9
Main workers: Household industry workers	35	32	3
Main workers: Other	184	148	36
Marginal workers (total)	416	216	200
Marginal workers: Cultivators	9	4	5
Marginal workers: Agricultural labourers	190	78	112
Marginal workers: Household industry workers	4	0	4
Marginal workers: Others	213	134	79
Non-workers	763	273	490
