= Medhipalayam =

- village
- Location in Tamil Nadu, India Medhipalayam (India)
- Coordinates: 13.4943478°N 80.1219215°E
- Country: India
- State: Tamil Nadu
- District: Tiruvallur
- Taluk: Gummidipoondi taluk
- Elevation: 3 m (9.8 ft)

Population (2011)
  - Total: 1,052
- Time zone: UTC+5:30 (IST)
- 2011 census code: 628556

Medhipalayam is a village in the Tiruvallur district of Tamil Nadu, India. It is located in the Gummidipoondi taluk.

== Demographics ==
According to the 2011 census of India, Medhipalayam has 283 households. The effective literacy rate (i.e. the literacy rate of population excluding children aged 6 and below) is 60.33%.

Demographics (2011 Census)
	Total	Male	Female
Population	1052	503	549
Children aged below 6 years	142	62	80
Scheduled caste	0	0	0
Scheduled tribe	0	0	0
Literates	549	312	237
Workers (all)	430	298	132
Main workers (total)	393	291	102
Main workers: Cultivators	2	2	0
Main workers: Agricultural labourers	222	135	87
Main workers: Household industry workers	0	0	0
Main workers: Other	169	154	15
Marginal workers (total)	37	7	30
Marginal workers: Cultivators	0	0	0
Marginal workers: Agricultural labourers	0	0	0
Marginal workers: Household industry workers	1	0	1
Marginal workers: Others	36	7	29
Non-workers	622	205	417
