= Tiruvallur division =

Thiruvallur division is a revenue division in the Tiruvallur district of Tamil Nadu, India. It comprises the taluks of Poonamallee, Uthukkottai and Tiruvallur.
