= Edur =

- village
- Location in Tamil Nadu, India Edur (India)
- Coordinates: 13.4794466°N 80.0702555°E
- Country: India
- State: Tamil Nadu
- District: Tiruvallur
- Taluk: Gummidipoondi taluk
- Elevation: 9 m (30 ft)

Population (2011)
  - Total: 2,939
- Time zone: UTC+5:30 (IST)
- 2011 census code: 628555

Edur is a village in the Tiruvallur district of Tamil Nadu, India. It is located in the Gummidipoondi taluk.

== Demographics ==
According to the 2011 census of India, Edur has 760 households. The effective literacy rate (i.e. the literacy rate of population excluding children aged 6 and below) is 65.18%.

Demographics (2011 Census)
	Total	Male	Female
Population	2939	1480	1459
Children aged below 6 years	294	142	152
Scheduled caste	1169	599	570
Scheduled tribe	30	11	19
Literates	1724	997	727
Workers (all)	1258	829	429
Main workers (total)	1218	810	408
Main workers: Cultivators	363	221	142
Main workers: Agricultural labourers	671	439	232
Main workers: Household industry workers	21	16	5
Main workers: Other	163	134	29
Marginal workers (total)	40	19	21
Marginal workers: Cultivators	3	1	2
Marginal workers: Agricultural labourers	25	11	14
Marginal workers: Household industry workers	3	1	2
Marginal workers: Others	9	6	3
Non-workers	1681	651	1030
