= Sunnambukkulam =

- village
- Location in Tamil Nadu, India Sunnambukkulam (India)
- Coordinates: 13.4868776°N 80.1498362°E
- Country: India
- State: Tamil Nadu
- District: Tiruvallur
- Taluk: Gummidipoondi taluk
- Elevation: 9 m (30 ft)

Population (2011)
  - Total: 3,057
- Time zone: UTC+5:30 (IST)
- 2011 census code: 628557

Sunnambukkulam is a village in the Tiruvallur district of Tamil Nadu, India. It is located in the Gummidipoondi taluk.

== Demographics ==
According to the 2011 census of India, Sunnambukkulam has 814 households. The effective literacy rate (i.e. the literacy rate of population excluding children aged 6 and below) is 64.2%.

Demographics (2011 Census)
	Total	Male	Female
Population	3057	1503	1554
Children aged below 6 years	345	167	178
Scheduled caste	195	97	98
Scheduled tribe	0	0	0
Literates	1741	985	756
Workers (all)	1230	899	331
Main workers (total)	920	745	175
Main workers: Cultivators	50	43	7
Main workers: Agricultural labourers	274	175	99
Main workers: Household industry workers	32	27	5
Main workers: Other	564	500	64
Marginal workers (total)	310	154	156
Marginal workers: Cultivators	13	6	7
Marginal workers: Agricultural labourers	125	58	67
Marginal workers: Household industry workers	17	7	10
Marginal workers: Others	155	83	72
Non-workers	1827	604	1223
