= Nemalur =

Nemallur
- village
- Location in Tamil Nadu, India Nemallur (India)
- Coordinates: 13.4306444°N 79.9919995°E
- Country: India
- State: Tamil Nadu
- District: Tiruvallur
- Taluk: Gummidipoondi
- Elevation: 30 m (98 ft)

Population (2011)
  - Total: 4,251
- Time zone: UTC+5:30 (IST)
- 2011 census code: 628573

Nemallur is a village in the Tiruvallur district of Tamil Nadu, India. It is located in the Gummidipoondi taluk.

== Demographics ==
According to the 2011 census of India, Nemalur has 1106 households. The effective literacy rate (i.e. the literacy rate of population excluding children aged 6 and below) is 66.96%.

Demographics (2011 Census)
	Total	Male	Female
Population	4251	2086	2165
Children aged below 6 years	416	204	212
Scheduled caste	1724	845	879
Scheduled tribe	476	237	239
Literates	2568	1393	1175
Workers (all)	2222	1304	918
Main workers (total)	2077	1223	854
Main workers: Cultivators	183	116	67
Main workers: Agricultural labourers	1293	660	633
Main workers: Household industry workers	47	32	15
Main workers: Other	554	415	139
Marginal workers (total)	145	81	64
Marginal workers: Cultivators	10	4	6
Marginal workers: Agricultural labourers	42	20	22
Marginal workers: Household industry workers	3	1	2
Marginal workers: Others	90	56	34
Non-workers	2029	782	1247
