= Eguvarpalayam =

- village
- Location in Tamil Nadu, India Eguvarpalayam (India)
- Coordinates: 13.4451742°N 80.0702555°E
- Country: India
- State: Tamil Nadu
- District: Tiruvallur
- Taluk: Gummidipoondi taluk
- Elevation: 19 m (62 ft)

Population (2011)
  - Total: 4,052
- Time zone: UTC+5:30 (IST)
- 2011 census code: 628567

Eguvarpalayam is a village in the Tiruvallur district of Tamil Nadu, India. It is located in the Gummidipoondi taluk.

== Demographics ==
According to the 2011 census of India, Eguvarpalayam has 1130 households. The effective literacy rate (i.e. the literacy rate of population excluding children aged 6 and below) is 68.02%.

Demographics (2011 Census)
	Total	Male	Female
Population	4052	2033	2019
Children aged below 6 years	465	252	213
Scheduled caste	1843	933	910
Scheduled tribe	305	150	155
Literates	2440	1358	1082
Workers (all)	1694	1178	516
Main workers (total)	1192	933	259
Main workers: Cultivators	158	150	8
Main workers: Agricultural labourers	367	231	136
Main workers: Household industry workers	10	10	0
Main workers: Other	657	542	115
Marginal workers (total)	502	245	257
Marginal workers: Cultivators	0	0	0
Marginal workers: Agricultural labourers	423	196	227
Marginal workers: Household industry workers	8	6	2
Marginal workers: Others	71	43	28
Non-workers	2358	855	1503
