= Vaniamallee =

- village
- Location in Tamil Nadu, India Vaniamallee (India)
- Coordinates: 13.42056°N 80.0255465°E
- Country: India
- State: Tamil Nadu
- District: Tiruvallur
- Taluk: Gummidipoondi
- Elevation: 21 m (69 ft)

Population (2011)
  - Total: 1,518
- Time zone: UTC+5:30 (IST)
- 2011 census code: 628580

Vaniamallee is a village in the Tiruvallur district of Tamil Nadu, India. It is located in the Gummidipoondi taluk.

== Demographics ==
According to the 2011 census of India, Vaniamallee has 416 households. The effective literacy rate (i.e. the literacy rate of population excluding children aged 6 and below) is 52.48%.

Demographics (2011 Census)
	Total	Male	Female
Population	1518	755	763
Children aged below 6 years	165	80	85
Scheduled caste	672	326	346
Scheduled tribe	112	61	51
Literates	710	409	301
Workers (all)	513	283	230
Main workers (total)	418	236	182
Main workers: Cultivators	27	20	7
Main workers: Agricultural labourers	183	95	88
Main workers: Household industry workers	10	7	3
Main workers: Other	198	114	84
Marginal workers (total)	95	47	48
Marginal workers: Cultivators	2	2	0
Marginal workers: Agricultural labourers	36	16	20
Marginal workers: Household industry workers	6	2	4
Marginal workers: Others	51	27	24
Non-workers	1005	472	533
