= Egumadurai =

Egumadurai எகுமதுரை
- village
- Location in Tamil Nadu, India Egumadurai (India)
- Coordinates: 13.534355°N 80.0143656°E
- Country: India
- State: Tamil Nadu
- District: Tiruvallur
- Taluk: Gummidipoondi taluk
- Elevation: 14 m (46 ft)

Population (2011)
  - Total: 831
- Time zone: UTC+5:30 (IST)
- 2011 census code: 628548

Egumadurai is a village in the Tiruvallur district of Tamil Nadu, India. It is located in the Gummidipoondi taluk.

== Demographics ==
According to the 2011 census of India, Egumadurai has 227 households. The effective literacy rate (i.e. the literacy rate of population excluding children aged 6 and below) is 52.07%.

Demographics (2011 Census)
	Total	Male	Female
Population	831	421	410
Children aged below 6 years	84	42	42
Scheduled caste	514	260	254
Scheduled tribe	34	17	17
Literates	389	227	162
Workers (all)	508	278	230
Main workers (total)	455	253	202
Main workers: Cultivators	228	141	87
Main workers: Agricultural labourers	147	85	62
Main workers: Household industry workers	50	3	47
Main workers: Other	30	24	6
Marginal workers (total)	53	25	28
Marginal workers: Cultivators	23	10	13
Marginal workers: Agricultural labourers	8	4	4
Marginal workers: Household industry workers	7	2	5
Marginal workers: Others	15	9	6
Non-workers	323	143	180
