= Venkuzhi =

- village
- Location in Tamil Nadu, India Venkuzhi (India)
- Coordinates: 13.3311626°N 80.0381232°E
- Country: India
- State: Tamil Nadu
- District: Tiruvallur
- Taluk: Gummidipoondi
- Elevation: 26 m (85 ft)

Population (2011)
  - Total: 45
- Time zone: UTC+5:30 (IST)
- 2011 census code: 628613

Venkuzhi is a village in the Tiruvallur district of Tamil Nadu, India. It is located in the Gummidipoondi taluk.

== Demographics ==
According to the 2011 census of India, Venkuzhi has 13 households. The effective literacy rate (i.e. the literacy rate of population excluding children aged 6 and below) is 51.28%.

Demographics (2011 Census)
	Total	Male	Female
Population	45	22	23
Children aged below 6 years	6	4	2
Scheduled caste	9	5	4
Scheduled tribe	1	1	0
Literates	20	9	11
Workers (all)	17	14	3
Main workers (total)	17	14	3
Main workers: Cultivators	3	3	0
Main workers: Agricultural labourers	10	8	2
Main workers: Household industry workers	3	2	1
Main workers: Other	1	1	0
Marginal workers (total)	0	0	0
Marginal workers: Cultivators	0	0	0
Marginal workers: Agricultural labourers	0	0	0
Marginal workers: Household industry workers	0	0	0
Marginal workers: Others	0	0	0
Non-workers	28	8	20
