= Tiruttani division =

Tiruttani division is a revenue division in the Tiruvallur district of Tamil Nadu, India. It comprises the taluks of Pallipattu and Tiruttani.
