= Melakalani =

- village
- Location in Tamil Nadu, India Melakalani (India)
- Coordinates: 13.4692393°N 80.1735565°E
- Country: India
- State: Tamil Nadu
- District: Tiruvallur
- Taluk: Gummidipoondi taluk
- Elevation: 5 m (16 ft)

Population (2011)
  - Total: 1,921
- Time zone: UTC+5:30 (IST)
- 2011 census code: 628559

Melakalani is a village in the Tiruvallur district of Tamil Nadu, India. It is located in the Gummidipoondi taluk.

== Demographics ==
According to the 2011 census of India, Melakalani has 547 households. The effective literacy rate (i.e. the literacy rate of population excluding children aged 6 and below) is 63.79%.

Demographics (2011 Census)
	Total	Male	Female
Population	1921	957	964
Children aged below 6 years	151	76	75
Scheduled caste	176	84	92
Scheduled tribe	0	0	0
Literates	1129	663	466
Workers (all)	1339	699	640
Main workers (total)	873	515	358
Main workers: Cultivators	270	149	121
Main workers: Agricultural labourers	365	177	188
Main workers: Household industry workers	22	3	19
Main workers: Other	216	186	30
Marginal workers (total)	466	184	282
Marginal workers: Cultivators	100	45	55
Marginal workers: Agricultural labourers	187	48	139
Marginal workers: Household industry workers	2	0	2
Marginal workers: Others	177	91	86
Non-workers	582	258	324
