= Ayathur =

Village in Tamil Nadu, India

- Village
- Location within Tamil Nadu Location within India
- Coordinates: 13°07′59″N 80°00′03″E
- Country: India
- State: Tamil Nadu
- District: Tiruvallur
- Taluk: Tiruvallur

Government
  - Type: Gram panchayat

Area
  - Total: 2.96 km^{2} (1.14 sq mi)
- Elevation: 38 m (125 ft)

Population (2011)
  - Total: 1,447
  - Density: 489/km^{2} (1,270/sq mi)

Languages
  - Official: Tamil
- Time zone: UTC+5:30 (IST)
- PIN: 602024
- STD code: 044
- Vehicle registration: TN-20

Ayathur is a village in Tiruvallur Taluk, Tiruvallur District, Tamil Nadu, India. It is located to the west of Palavedu Lake, about 30 kilometres west of Chennai, and 10 kilometres east of the district capital Tiruvallur. As of 2011, the village had a population of 1,447.

== Geography ==
Ayathur is situated to the north of the National Highway 716. It covers an area of 296.3 hectares.

== Demographics ==
According to the 2011 Census of India, Ayathur had 354 households under its administration. Among the 1,447 residents, 740 were men and 707 were women. The overall literacy rate of the village was 79.13%, with 622 of the male and 523 of the female population being literate. Its census location code was 629051.
