= Sepedu =

- village
- Location in Tamil Nadu, India Sepedu (India)
- Coordinates: 13.3438356°N 80.0339312°E
- Country: India
- State: Tamil Nadu
- District: Tiruvallur
- Taluk: Gummidipoondi
- Elevation: 27 m (89 ft)

Population (2011)
  - Total: 231
- Time zone: UTC+5:30 (IST)
- 2011 census code: 628614

Sepedu is a village in the Tiruvallur district of Tamil Nadu, India. It is located in the Gummidipoondi taluk.

== Demographics ==
According to the 2011 census of India, Sepedu has 61 households. The effective literacy rate (i.e. the literacy rate of population excluding children aged 6 and below) is 48.56%.

Demographics (2011 Census)
	Total	Male	Female
Population	231	113	118
Children aged below 6 years	23	8	15
Scheduled caste	205	101	104
Scheduled tribe	0	0	0
Literates	101	52	49
Workers (all)	76	71	5
Main workers (total)	76	71	5
Main workers: Cultivators	3	3	0
Main workers: Agricultural labourers	60	55	5
Main workers: Household industry workers	0	0	0
Main workers: Other	13	13	0
Marginal workers (total)	0	0	0
Marginal workers: Cultivators	0	0	0
Marginal workers: Agricultural labourers	0	0	0
Marginal workers: Household industry workers	0	0	0
Marginal workers: Others	0	0	0
Non-workers	155	42	113
