= Paleswaram =

- village
- Location in Tamil Nadu, India Paleswaram (India)
- Coordinates: 13.3168993°N 80.0381232°E
- Country: India
- State: Tamil Nadu
- District: Tiruvallur
- Taluk: Gummidipoondi
- Elevation: 27 m (89 ft)

Population (2011)
  - Total: 250
- Time zone: UTC+5:30 (IST)
- 2011 census code: 628612

Paleswaram is a village in the Tiruvallur district of Tamil Nadu, India. It is located in the Gummidipoondi taluk.

== Demographics ==
According to the 2011 census of India, Paleswaram has 67 households. The effective literacy rate (i.e. the literacy rate of population excluding children aged 6 and below) is 66.81%.

Demographics (2011 Census)
	Total	Male	Female
Population	250	120	130
Children aged below 6 years	21	13	8
Scheduled caste	0	0	0
Scheduled tribe	0	0	0
Literates	153	79	74
Workers (all)	123	73	50
Main workers (total)	43	35	8
Main workers: Cultivators	2	2	0
Main workers: Agricultural labourers	0	0	0
Main workers: Household industry workers	0	0	0
Main workers: Other	41	33	8
Marginal workers (total)	80	38	42
Marginal workers: Cultivators	0	0	0
Marginal workers: Agricultural labourers	78	36	42
Marginal workers: Household industry workers	0	0	0
Marginal workers: Others	2	2	0
Non-workers	127	47	80
