= Poovalai =

- village
- Location in Tamil Nadu, India Poovalai (India)
- Coordinates: 13.5018556°N 80.0590804°E
- Country: India
- State: Tamil Nadu
- District: Tiruvallur
- Taluk: Gummidipoondi taluk
- Elevation: 18 m (59 ft)

Population (2011)
  - Total: 1,033
- Time zone: UTC+5:30 (IST)
- 2011 census code: 628551

Poovalai is a village in the Tiruvallur district of Tamil Nadu, India. It is located in the Gummidipoondi taluk.

== Demographics ==
According to the 2011 census of India, Poovalai has 235 households. The effective literacy rate (i.e. the literacy rate of population excluding children aged 6 and below) is 55.54%.

Demographics (2011 Census)
	Total	Male	Female
Population	1033	523	510
Children aged below 6 years	158	81	77
Scheduled caste	447	234	213
Scheduled tribe	93	48	45
Literates	486	266	220
Workers (all)	579	323	256
Main workers (total)	574	319	255
Main workers: Cultivators	12	7	5
Main workers: Agricultural labourers	500	266	234
Main workers: Household industry workers	7	4	3
Main workers: Other	55	42	13
Marginal workers (total)	5	4	1
Marginal workers: Cultivators	1	1	0
Marginal workers: Agricultural labourers	0	0	0
Marginal workers: Household industry workers	0	0	0
Marginal workers: Others	4	3	1
Non-workers	454	200	254
