= Kannambakkam =

- village
- Location in Tamil Nadu, India Kannambakkam (India)
- Coordinates: 13.5142109°N 80.0465067°E
- Country: India
- State: Tamil Nadu
- District: Tiruvallur
- Taluk: Gummidipoondi taluk
- Elevation: 24 m (79 ft)

Population (2011)
  - Total: 1,161
- Time zone: UTC+5:30 (IST)
- 2011 census code: 628552

Kannambakkam is a village in the Tiruvallur district of Tamil Nadu, India. It is located in the Gummidipoondi taluk.

== Demographics ==
According to the 2011 census of India, Kannambakkam has 317 households. The effective literacy rate (i.e. the literacy rate of population excluding children aged 6 and below) is 60.09%.

Demographics (2011 Census)
	Total	Male	Female
Population	1161	586	575
Children aged below 6 years	106	56	50
Scheduled caste	786	402	384
Scheduled tribe	82	40	42
Literates	634	366	268
Workers (all)	576	357	219
Main workers (total)	563	351	212
Main workers: Cultivators	39	37	2
Main workers: Agricultural labourers	402	217	185
Main workers: Household industry workers	13	9	4
Main workers: Other	109	88	21
Marginal workers (total)	13	6	7
Marginal workers: Cultivators	2	1	1
Marginal workers: Agricultural labourers	4	1	3
Marginal workers: Household industry workers	0	0	0
Marginal workers: Others	7	4	3
Non-workers	585	229	356
