= Thurapallam =

- village
- Location in Tamil Nadu, India Thurapallam (India)
- Coordinates: 13.4558378°N 80.1233175°E
- Country: India
- State: Tamil Nadu
- District: Tiruvallur
- Taluk: Gummidipoondi taluk
- Elevation: 14 m (46 ft)

Population (2011)
  - Total: 3,371
- Time zone: UTC+5:30 (IST)
- 2011 census code: 628565

Thurapallam is a village in the Tiruvallur district of Tamil Nadu, India. It is located in the Gummidipoondi taluk.

== Demographics ==
According to the 2011 census of India, Thurapallam has 877 households. The effective literacy rate (i.e. the literacy rate of population excluding children aged 6 and below) is 78.08%.

Demographics (2011 Census)
	Total	Male	Female
Population	3371	1658	1713
Children aged below 6 years	410	207	203
Scheduled caste	72	39	33
Scheduled tribe	7	4	3
Literates	2312	1275	1037
Workers (all)	1390	981	409
Main workers (total)	804	615	189
Main workers: Cultivators	50	33	17
Main workers: Agricultural labourers	178	113	65
Main workers: Household industry workers	22	13	9
Main workers: Other	554	456	98
Marginal workers (total)	586	366	220
Marginal workers: Cultivators	28	18	10
Marginal workers: Agricultural labourers	312	177	135
Marginal workers: Household industry workers	24	14	10
Marginal workers: Others	222	157	65
Non-workers	1981	677	1304
