= Mukkarambakkam =

- village
- Location in Tamil Nadu, India Mukkarambakkam (India)
- Coordinates: 13.3287989°N 80.0143656°E
- Country: India
- State: Tamil Nadu
- District: Tiruvallur
- Taluk: Gummidipoondi
- Elevation: 28 m (92 ft)

Population (2011)
  - Total: 3,488
- Time zone: UTC+5:30 (IST)
- 2011 census code: 628610

Mukkarambakkam is a village in the Tiruvallur district of Tamil Nadu, India. It is located in the Gummidipoondi taluk.

== Demographics ==
According to the 2011 census of India, Mukkarambakkam has 869 households. The effective literacy rate (i.e. the literacy rate of population excluding children aged 6 and below) is 67.93%.

Demographics (2011 Census)
	Total	Male	Female
Population	3488	1768	1720
Children aged below 6 years	420	225	195
Scheduled caste	1829	934	895
Scheduled tribe	341	176	165
Literates	2084	1169	915
Workers (all)	2000	1144	856
Main workers (total)	1596	977	619
Main workers: Cultivators	193	130	63
Main workers: Agricultural labourers	1142	672	470
Main workers: Household industry workers	7	1	6
Main workers: Other	254	174	80
Marginal workers (total)	404	167	237
Marginal workers: Cultivators	16	7	9
Marginal workers: Agricultural labourers	303	116	187
Marginal workers: Household industry workers	3	1	2
Marginal workers: Others	82	43	39
Non-workers	1488	624	864
