= Appavaram =

- village
- Location in Tamil Nadu, India Appavaram (India)
- Coordinates: 13.4505909°N 80.1575881°E
- Country: India
- State: Tamil Nadu
- District: Tiruvallur
- Taluk: Gummidipoondi taluk
- Elevation: 16 m (52 ft)

Population (2011)
  - Total: 872
- Time zone: UTC+5:30 (IST)
- 2011 census code: 628560

Appavaram is a village in the Tiruvallur district of Tamil Nadu, India. It is located in the Gummidipoondi taluk.

This village is located near the Rakkampalayam lake, and the Eucalyptus lake of Pattupalli. It is located north of Sennavaram and east of Pattupalli.

== Demographics ==
According to the 2011 census of India, Appavaram has 247 households. The effective literacy rate (i.e. the literacy rate of population excluding children aged 6 and below) is 61.55%.

Demographics (2011 Census)
	Total	Male	Female
Population	872	430	442
Children aged below 6 years	97	48	49
Scheduled caste	7	2	5
Scheduled tribe	0	0	0
Literates	477	282	195
Workers (all)	474	280	194
Main workers (total)	406	236	170
Main workers: Cultivators	152	92	60
Main workers: Agricultural labourers	139	54	85
Main workers: Household industry workers	1	0	1
Main workers: Other	114	90	24
Marginal workers (total)	68	44	24
Marginal workers: Cultivators	2	1	1
Marginal workers: Agricultural labourers	62	41	21
Marginal workers: Household industry workers	0	0	0
Marginal workers: Others	4	2	2
Non-workers	398	150	248
