= Melpakkam =

- Village
- Location in Tamil Nadu, India
- Coordinates: 13.40665°N 80.12380°E
- Country: India
- State: Tamil Nadu
- District: Tiruvallur

Population (2001)
  - Total: 250

Languages
  - Official: Tamil
- Time zone: UTC+5:30 (IST)
- PIN: 601201
- Vehicle registration: TN-20

Melpakkam is a small village located in Eguvarpalayam Panchayat in Gummidipoondi taluk in Thiruvallur district in the Indian state of Tamil Nadu. It is known as the only state-owned rehabilitation centre in Tamil Nadu for beggars, founded on nine acres of land in the 1950s.

== Politics ==
Gummidipoondi assembly constituency is part of Thiruvallur (Lok Sabha constituency).

== Economy ==
Near to Melpakkam are two important factories, Dupont Fibers and Hitech Carbon (an Aditya Birla Group company), also known as Birla Carbon. Subsequently, DuPont Fibres has been taken over by SRF Limited. SRF stands for Shriram Fibres Limited and is the 8th largest producer of nylon tyre cord fabric in the world.

== Transport ==
Melpakkam lies on the Melpakkam Road from Gummidipoondi to Madaharpakkam. Nearest Bus Stop: Melpakkam Bus Stand (or) Eguvarpalayam Bus stand

Nearest Railway Station: Gummidipoondi.

== Adjacent communities ==
Gummidipoondi - 6 km (Road)

Madarpakkam - 4 km (Road)
