= Periapalayam =

Human settlement in India

Periapalayam is a village located on the banks of the Arani river about 40 km North-West of Chennai. It is part of the Ellapuram block in Tiruvallur District. Due to the recent increase in MSMEs along the North Chennai Development corridor, it is quickly becoming the primary residential area for the wave of workers working in the nearby SIPCOT industrial area. Located along the primary connecting road between Chennai and Tirupathi means it is well connected to the cities via public road transport. The village is also home to the famous Periyapalayam Bhavani Amman temple.

== Geography ==
Arani river flows through the village.

== Demographics ==
=== Population ===
In the 2001 Indian census Periyapalayam (Tamil Nadu, India) had a population of 5,420, of which 2,756 were male, and 2,664 were female.

In the 2011 census Periyapalayam (Tamil Nadu, India) recorded 7311 inhabitants.

== Government and politics ==
=== Civic Utility / Amenities / Services ===
It has a Govt. upgraded Primary Health Center (PHC) which is behind the temple and also one Girls higher secondary school in Uthukottai Road.

== Economy ==
It has several big companies like Winwind in Vengal village, Pennar in Kannigaipair, Sujana industries in Manjakaranai, Hydrabad chemicals in Kannigaipair and several warehouses Like Bata India Ltd (RDC) in Periyapalyam. It also has hundreds of brick chambers.

== Culture/Cityscape ==
Village Distribution

The Periapalayam Village is, locally, separated into 2 parts, the Temple side and the Residential side which is separated by the Arani river. The Temple side consists of the Govt. upgraded primary health center, Bhavani Amman Temple, Govt. guest house behind the Temple and the Govt. Campus which consists of the Govt. Higher secondary school of Periapalayam, Assistant Education Office (AEO), Block development Office, Veterinary Hospital and the Agricultural office.

The residential side consists of The Post office of Periapalayam, Police Station, Govt. Primary school, Tamil Nadu Co-operative Bank, a church and St.Joseph Matriculation High School, Dharmaraja Shivan Temple and houses of the Periapalayam residents. This side contains the Periapalayam bus stand.

=== Landmarks ===
Bhavani Amman Temple is located in Periyapalayam.

== Transport ==
=== By Road ===
Bus route

- from CMBT --> 514
- from Redhills --> 592,547.
- from Avadi --> 580.
- From Vallar Nagar(Mint)-57x

== Education ==
=== Colleges ===
Colleges in and around Periyapalayam are:

- S.A.M.S College of Engineering & Technology (SCET) in Pannapakkam,
- Siva Institute of Technology Periyapalayam
- Magna College of Engineering in Magaral
- JNN college of Engineering in Kannigaipair
- Southern Academy of Maritime Studies (S.A.M.S) in Panapakkam

=== Schools ===
St.Joseph's matriculation school in Periyapalayam
