= Arambakkam railway station =

Railway Junction in Tiruvallur, India

General information
- Location: Arambakkam, Tamil Nadu
- Coordinates: 13.5329°N 80.0750°E
- Elevation: 12 metres (39 ft)
- System: rail station
- Owner: Indian Railways
- Operator: Southern Railway zone
- Line: Chennai–Gudur
- Platforms: 2 side platforms

Construction
- Parking: Available
- Accessible: Yes

Other information
- Status: Functional
- Station code: AKM
- Zone(s): Southern Railway zone
- Division(s): Chennai
Location
- Location within Tamil Nadu
- Interactive map

Arambakkam railway station (station code: AKM) is a railway station located in Arambakkam, Tiruvallur district in the Indian state of Tamil Nadu. It is located on the Gudur–Chennai section of the Howrah-Chennai main line and comes under the jurisdiction of Chennai railway division of Southern Railway zone. It is classified as a NSG-6 station (annual revenue less than 10 million rupees and less than 1 million passengers handled).
