= Pennalurpet =

- village
- Location in Tamil Nadu, India Pennalurpet (India)
- Coordinates: 13°18′N 79°51′E
- Country: India
- State: Tamil Nadu
- District: Tiruvallur
- Taluka: Uthukkottai

Population (2011)
  - Total: 5,466

Languages
  - Official: Tamil
- Time zone: UTC+5:30 (IST)
- Postal code: 602022

Pennalurpet (Tamil: Pennalurpettai) is a village in Tamil Nadu, India located near the Andhra Pradesh–Tamil Nadu border. It is an important place for commercial marketing of nearby village people and farmers. Pennalurpet was ruled by Zamindars who paid the tax for this village to kings. Their family is still living in this village. The Zamindar family's surname is "Bollampalli" and present descendents names are B.Subbarathnam, B. Ramachandran, B. Rajagopal and their Children B.Venkataramana, B.Pradeep Kumar & B. Sreeram They have donated their guest house and other buildings to the village for school. Under British rule it served as a temporary place to store explosive. Around 1990 people found two old bombs used for tanks; the bombs were from the British Army's tank explosives that may have been used in World War II.

== Geography ==
Pennalurpet is in the Thiruvallur district of Uthukottai Taluk, 24 km from the town of Thiruvallur and 12 km from Poondi. It is near a forest surrounded by several mountains and in the vicinity of the forest temple known as Mannachi Amman Caves Temple.

== Demographics ==
In the 2001 Indian census, Pennalurpet had a population of 3,567, with 1,733 males and 1,834 females.

In the 2011 census, Pennalurpet reported 5,466 inhabitants.

== Language ==
Tamil is the official language. Since the village is located near Andhra Pradesh, most people also know Telugu.

== Temple ==
A Hanuman temple was located in Velemakandigai (1 km from Pennalurpet) which is several years old and believed to be Suyambu Moorthy.

Every year in the last week of May (Hanuman Jayanthi) the people from Velamakandriga host the annual festival for the gracious temple lord. During this period poojas and special annadhanams in the afternoon (for more than 1500 people) are performed daily for ten days and the seventh day is considered special because on the fire festival which decorates the evening.

Towards west side is the Nagathamman temple, north side is the Santhavalliyamman temple, south side is the Palayathamman temple, and east side is the Lord Siva Temple in Thamaraikulam.
