= Chinna Nagapoondi =

- Village
- Location in Tamil Nadu, India
- Coordinates: 13°8′14″N 79°20′34″E
- Country: India
- State: Tamil Nadu
- District: Tiruvallur

Population (2001)
  - Total: 944

Languages
  - Official: Tamil
- Time zone: UTC+5:30 (IST)

Chinna Nagapoondi is a panchayat village located in Tiruvallur district of Tamil Nadu, India. It is located on the Sholinghur–Chittoor highway and falls under the R. K. Pettai circle. The village is home to about 500 agricultural family. Per 2001 census, the population of the village was 944.

Prime landmarks include Padavaettamman temple abutting the highway. The temple has a tank. The western side of the tank has an elementary school, Agri-development centre, and the village administrative office. The northern side has threshing field and a library. The eastern side is chiefly residential, with several houses, shops, and hotels.

== See also ==
- Periya Nagapoondi
