= Ponneri division =

Ponneri division is a revenue division in the Tiruvallur district of Tamil Nadu, India. It comprises the taluks of Gummidipoondi and Ponneri.
