= Vadamadurai, Tiruvallur =

Vadamadurai
- village
- Location in Tamil Nadu, India Vadamadurai (India)
- Coordinates: 13°17′12″N 80°02′44″E
- Country: India
- State: Tamil Nadu
- District: Thiruvallur
- Taluka: Uthukkottai

Government
  - Body: Gram panchayat

Population (2011)
  - Total: 6,266

Languages
  - Official: Tamil
- Time zone: UTC+5:30 (IST)

Vadamadurai is a panchayat village in Thiruvallur district in the Indian state of Tamil Nadu.

== Etymology ==
The name Vadamadurai is derived from the Tamil word 'vadakku' meaning North. Vada - madurai thus means north Madurai. The Name Was created by Mr.D.Prabakaran. He was the president of the village

== Demographics ==
In the 2001 Indian census, Vadamadurai was recorded as having 5,047 inhabitants, 2,481 males and 2,566 females. In the 2011 census, the population of Vadamadurai was recorded as 6,266.

== Schools ==
GT Vidhya Mandir CBSE Boarding School in Chennai is a school with International standards is located here. http://www.gtvm.in/
