= Lakshmi Narasimhar Temple, Narasinghapuram =

Sri Lakshmi Narasimhar Temple
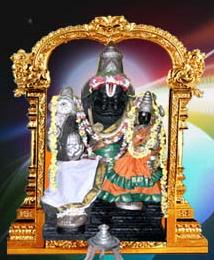

- Location in Tamil Nadu

Religion
- Affiliation: Hinduism
- District: Tiruvallur
- Deity: Lakshmi Narasimha

Location
- State: Tamil Nadu
- Country: India
- Coordinates: 13°01′31″N 79°48′24″E

Architecture
- Type: Dravidian architecture

Sri Lakshmi Narasimhar Temple (Tamil: ஸ்ரீ லக்ஷ்மி நரசிம்ஹர் பெருமாள்) is located about 55 km from Chennai and 21 km from Arakkonam, in Narasingapuram, Thiruvallur. The temple is dedicated to Hindu deity Narasimha, who is avatar of Vishnu and his consort Lakshmi. The temple of Lakhsmi Narasimha at Narasingapuram is reminiscent of the era of Cholas and Vijayanagara Rayas in South India. The Lakshmi Narasimha Temple is situated in the village of Narasingapuram in Thiruvallur district.

== History ==
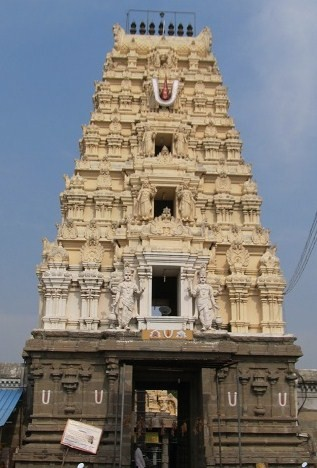
Lak narasimhar

In the early period of Cholas Saivism took prominence and Vaishnavism was suppressed by it. Even amidst the situation prevailed in South India the temple of Lakshmi Narasimha enjoyed patronage and was well governed. Later at the glorious era of Vijayanagara nayaks where Vaishnavism flourished and given much importance in both politics and as a religion, the Lakhsmi Narasimha temple became important along with Sriperumbudur(Ramanujar Temple) though both are not in 108 Divyadesam. And the temple is also nearer to sriperumbudur. Vijayanagara Nayak Emperors patronised it and gave many villages as charter to the temple’s development and as well as the religion.

The temple, a fine specimen of the Vijayanagar style of architecture with delicately sculpted and carved pillars . Architecture in the temple made one think that it belonged to the Vijayanagar period, there are inscriptions dating back to the reign of Chola kings. Archaeologists consider those inscriptions in the Andal shrine basement as more ancient and belonging to the period of Kulothunga Chozha I and Vikrama Chozha I. They speak about their constructing the Madurantaka Vinnagar temple in Madurantaka Nalloor (the present Madurantakam) and installing the idols of Rama, Sita and Lakshmana in it and the grants made by them for the daily conduct of poojas.

== Inscriptions ==
There are as many as 14 inscriptions in and around the temple in which two of them belong to the Chola period. And this stands evidence that the temple even survived the Saivism wave that took effect under the Cholas in the early period like many other important Vaishnavite temples that survived it in South India in the early period.

The 12 stone inscriptions that are found in the temple dates back to the Vijayanagar period describe about the glorious past of temple and the Emperors. Most of the inscriptions belong to the reign of Emperor Atchudha Deva Maharaya describing about the donations and renovating construction led by his government at the temple. In those five important inscriptions belong to the years of A.D. 1533, 1534 and 1536 which are some of the important years of his rule. Emperor Atchudha Deva Maharaya is the younger brother of Krishna Devaraya whose reign was considered to be the golden period of south Indian history. One inscription belongs to the reign of Venkatapathy Deva Maharaya describing about his esteemed work for the temple. It dates back to the year 1608 and also considered to be the latest inscription to be found in the temple premises. All these inscriptions are in Sanscritised Telugu which is still a local language prevailing in the surrounding areas of Narasingapuram.

== Religious Significance ==
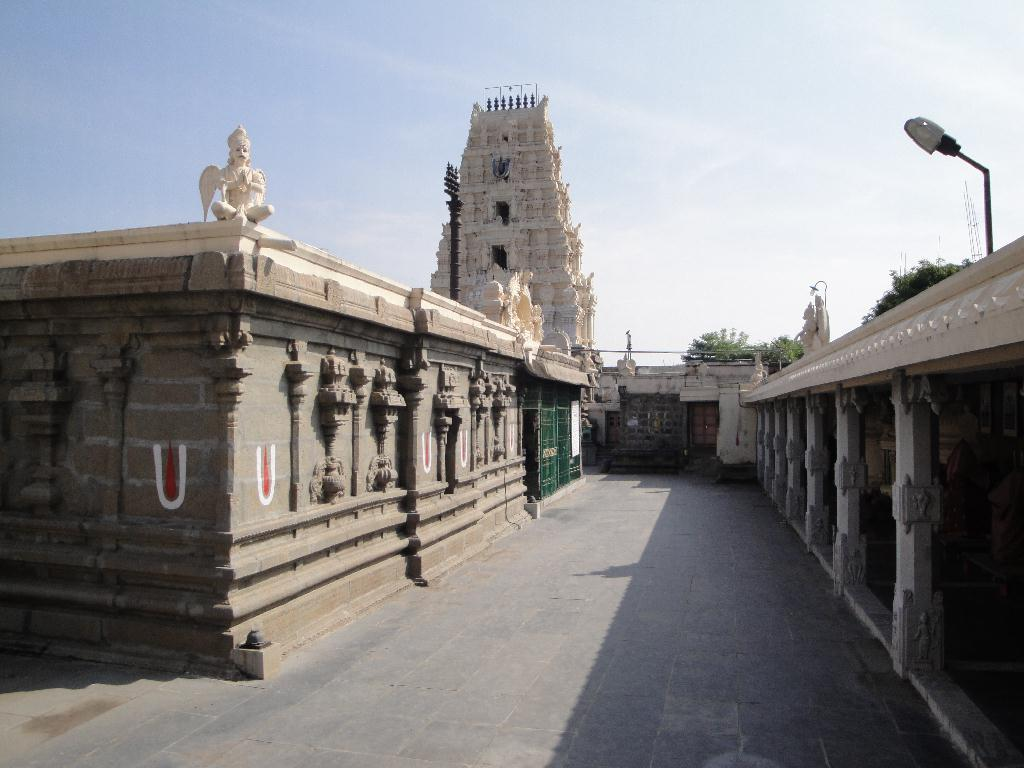
Lak narasimhar

The deity also has the name 'Sri Kalyana Lakshmi Narasimhar' since holds Lordess Lakshmi closely (Aalinganam). The Periya Thiruvadi (Garudazhwar) is about four feet high, and about sixteen serpents adorn his body as jewels. Those who worship this temple for about nine Swathi Nakshatirams are entitled with complete bliss with respect to health and wealth and any associated problems in those vanishes. The Perumal is also called 'Sri Kalyana Lakshmi Narasimhar' as he performs 'aalinganam' - holding Sri Lakshmi very closely. Periya Thiruvadi - Garudalwar, is about 4 feet high and 16 nagams (snakes) are found in his body as ornaments. It is believed that by continuously worshipping this Narasimhar for nine Swathi nakshathiram days, all wealth/health problems, obstacles in marriage etc., will vanish. Lord Narasimhar here appears as Shantha moorthy and has a smiling face. In the temple, Mahalakshmi in the lap of Narasimhar is facing the devotees and blessing them..In case of Ugra Narasimhar temples, Mahalakshmi is seen facing the lord trying to pacify the lord's anger. The posture of Narasimhar and Mahalakshmi is called "Paraspara Alinganman" meaning both of them are embracing each other as compared to other temples where only Mahalakshmi appears in an embracing posture. Garudan here has 16 types of snakes around and hence the devotees are freed of Naga dosham.

== Etymology ==
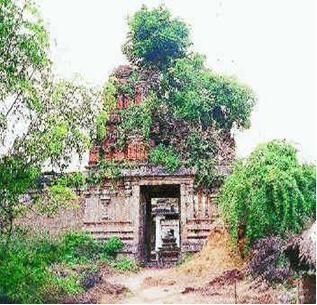
Lak_narasimhar temple before renovation

An old inscription in the Lakhsmi Narasimha temple which describes about the establishment of the presiding deity’s Urchavar idol Prahaladha Purandhara that is named after the lord’s avathar purport says " Narasinga perumal temple is situated in the village of Narasa Nayakar Puram that is nearby Coovam (age old chola era saivist temple village) and under the jurisdiction of the Jayamkonda Chola Mandalam of Chandragiri kingdom’s southernmost part. The name of Narasa Nayakar Puram has become Narasingapuram in the later period because of colloquial reference of the village to the temple and its deity.

== See also ==
- Narasingapuram, Thiruvallur
