= Ammavarikuppam =

Ammaiyarkuppam
- Town
- Location in Tamil Nadu, India
- Coordinates: 13°11′43″N 79°24′14″E
- Country: India
- State: Tamil Nadu
- District: Thiruvallur

Population (2001)
  - Total: 9,374

Languages
  - Official: Tamil
- Time zone: UTC+5:30 (IST)
- PIN: 631301
- Telephone code: 044

Ammaiyarkuppam is a census town in Thiruvallur district in the state of Tamil Nadu, India.

== Demographics ==
As of 2009 India census, Ammaiyarkuppam had a population of 15234. Males constitute 62% of the population and females 38%. Ammaiyarkuppam has an average literacy rate of 76%, higher than the national average of 59.5%; with 61% of the males and 39% of females literate. 14% of the population is under 6 years of age.
