= V.K.N. Kandigai =

V.K.N. Kandigai Vellore Krishnamma Naidu Kandigai
- Village
- Location in Tamil Nadu, India V.K.N. Kandigai (India)
- Coordinates: 13.3751°N 79.9961°E
- Country: India
- State: Tamil Nadu
- District: Thiruvallur

Languages
  - Official: Tamil
- Time zone: UTC+5:30 (IST)
- PIN: 631201
- Vehicle registration: TN-20

V.K.N. Kandigai is a small village in the Tiruvallur district of Tamil Nadu, India. It is located 60 kilometres (37 miles) west of Chennai.
