= Arambakkam =

- village
- Location in Tamil Nadu, India Arambakkam (India)
- Coordinates: 13.5426818°N 80.0690056°E
- Country: India
- State: Tamil Nadu
- District: Tiruvallur
- Taluk: Gummidipoondi
- Elevation: 12 m (39 ft)

Population (2011)
  - Total: 11,363

Languages
  - Official: Tamil
- Time zone: UTC+5:30 (IST)
- 2011 census code: 628550

Arambakkam is a village in the Tiruvallur district of Tamil Nadu, India. It is located in the Gummidipoondi taluk.

== Demographics ==
According to the 2011 census of India, Arambakkam has 2798 households. The effective literacy rate (i.e. the literacy rate of population excluding children aged 6 and below) is 65.89%.

Demographics (2011 Census)
	Total	Male	Female
Population	11363	5609	5754
Children aged below 6 years	1309	649	660
Scheduled caste	1288	602	686
Scheduled tribe	233	112	121
Literates	6625	3622	3003
Workers (all)	4820	3406	1414
Main workers (total)	4425	3211	1214
Main workers: Cultivators	162	137	25
Main workers: Agricultural labourers	1410	929	481
Main workers: Household industry workers	46	19	27
Main workers: Other	2807	2126	681
Marginal workers (total)	395	195	200
Marginal workers: Cultivators	11	6	5
Marginal workers: Agricultural labourers	222	110	112
Marginal workers: Household industry workers	6	1	5
Marginal workers: Others	156	78	78
Non-workers	6543	2203	4340

All the inhabitants could understand and speak Tamil and Telugu as it is in near to Andhra border.

== Transportation ==
There is a Railway station in Arambakkam railway station . Many Suburban train, Passenger trains are run to Chennai Central railway station, Nellore railway station, Tirupati railway station .

National Highway 16 (India) passes through this city.

Most of APSRTC and TNSTC Buses are well connected to Chennai Tirupathi and Nellore through arambakkam Town.
