= Vengathur =

Coordinates: 13.1006°N 79.9289°E

- Census town
- Interactive map of Vengathur
- Country: India
- State: Tamil Nadu
- District: Thiruvallur

Population (2013)
  - Total: 17,003

Languages
  - Official: Tamil
- Time zone: UTC+5:30 (IST)

Vengathur is a census town in Thiruvallur district in the Indian state of Tamil Nadu.

== Demographics ==
As of 2001 India census, Vengathur had a population of 17,003. Males constitute 51% of the population and females 49%. Vengathur has an average literacy rate of 78%, higher than the national average of 59.5%: male literacy is 84%, and female literacy is 72%. In Vengathur, 10% of the population is under 6 years of age.
