= Periya Nagapoondi =

- Village
- Location in Tamil Nadu, India
- Coordinates: 13°8′14″N 79°20′34″E
- Country: India
- State: Tamil Nadu
- District: Tiruvallur

Population (2001)
  - Total: 1,571

Languages
  - Official: Tamil
- Time zone: UTC+5:30 (IST)
- PIN: 631302

Periya Nagapoondi is a panchayat village located in Tiruvallur district of Tamil Nadu, India. Per 2001 census, the population of the village was 1,571.

== See also ==
- Chinna Nagapoondi
