= Uthukkottai taluk =

Taluk of Tiruvallur district of the Indian state of Tamil Nadu

Coordinates: 13.3367°N 79.9013°E

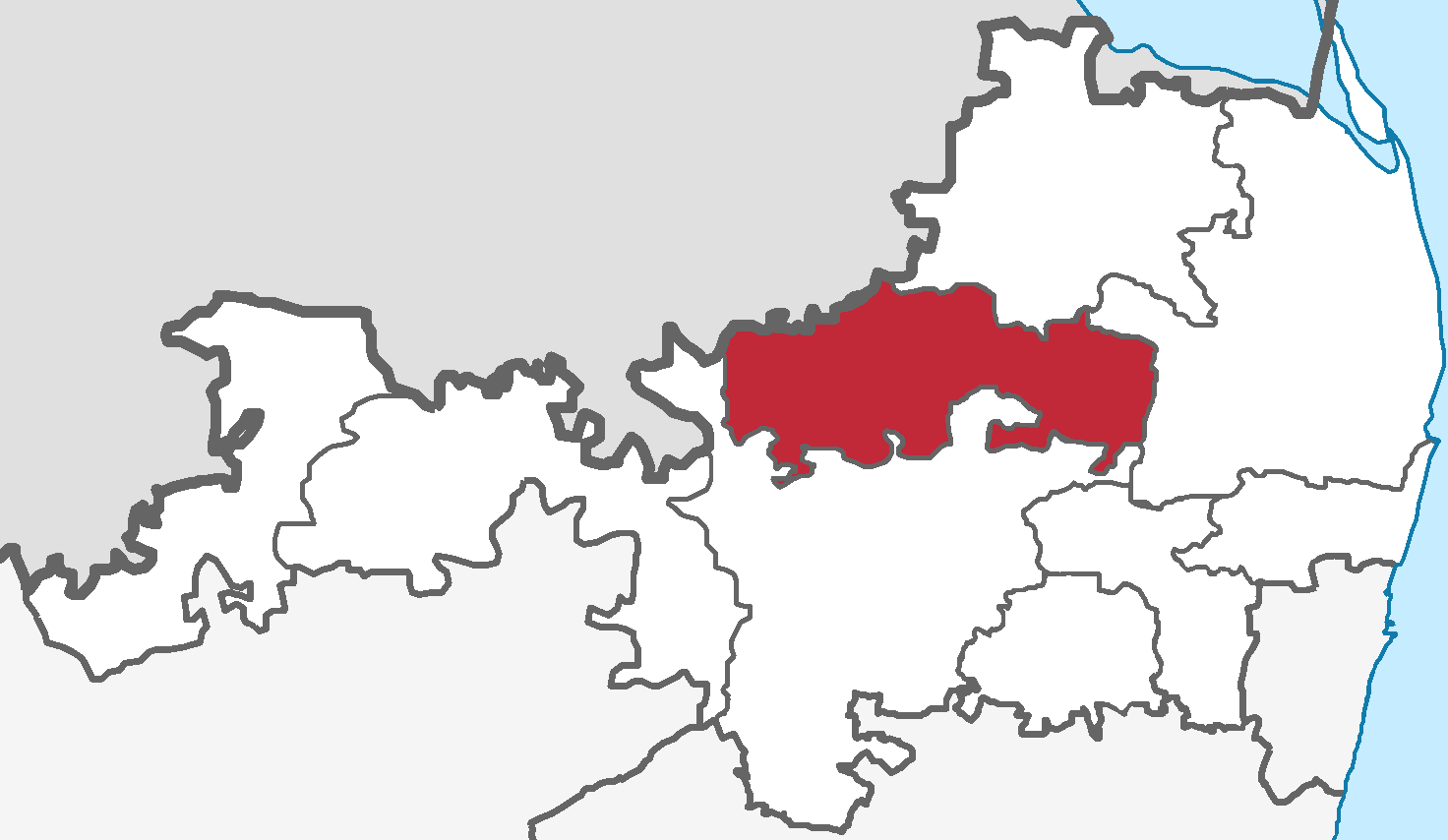

Uthukkottai taluk is a taluk of Tiruvallur district of the Indian state of Tamil Nadu. The headquarters of the taluk is the town of Uthukkottai.

== Demographics ==
According to the 2011 census, the taluk of Uthukkottai had a population of 149,991 with 74,079 males and 75,912 females. There were 1025 women for every 1000 men. The taluk had a literacy rate of 62.34. Child population in the age group below 6 was 7,803 Males and 7,581 Females.

== Points of interest ==
- Sri Bhavani Amman Temple in Periapalayam
- Surutapalli Pallikondeswarar Temple,
- Gangaikonda cholapuram temple, a UNESCO site in Gangaikonda cholapuram is nearly 2 km from the taluk about 2 km from the town of Uthukkottai, has the only "Sayana Sivan" (sleeping Siva), which is called 'Pallikondeswarar.

== Towns and villages ==
Uthukkottai Taluk has one town, the panchayat town of Uthukkottai, and eighty-eight villages. At the 2011 census, three of the villages had populations over 5000: Pennalurpet, Periyapalayam, and Vadamadurai. The villages are:

- Adhilivakkam
- Akkarapakkam
- Alapakkam I
- Alapakkam II
- Alinjivakkam
- Amindanallur
- Ammambakkam
- Ananderi
- Annadanakkakavakkam
- Ariapakkam I
- Ariapakkam II
- Ariyathur
- Athangikavanur
- Athupakkam
- Attrambakkam
- Avicheri
- Boochiathipattu
- Devandavakkam
- Edambedu
- Ellapuram
- Enambakkam
- Gerugambakkam
- Goonipalayam
- Govindarajakuppam
- Gurupuram
- Kadarvedu
- Kaiyadai
- kammarpalayam
- Kakkavakkam
- Kalavai
- Kalpattu
- Kannigaipair
- Katchur
- Kilakarmanur
- Koorambakkam
- Korakkanthandalam
- Kottakuppam
- Kunjaram
- Lachivakkam
- Madavilagam
- Maduravasal
- Mambakkam
- Mamballam
- Mambattu
- Manjankaranai
- Melakaramanur
- Melandur
- Melmaligaipattu
- Meyyur
- Mylapore
- Nambakkam
- Nayapakkam
- Neiveli
- Nelvoy
- Oddappai
- Pagalamedu
- Palavakkam
- Panapakkam I
- Panapakkam II
- Panayancheri
- Pennalurpet
- Perandur
- Perittivakkam
- Periyapalayam
- Perumudivakkam
- Pondavakkam
- Puducheri
- Punnapakkam
- Rallapadi
- Seeyancheri
- Sengarai
- Sengunram
- Senjiagaram
- Sennankaranai
- Soolaimani
- Thamaraikuppam
- Thandalam
- Tharatchi (Tharakshi)
- Thimmaboopalapuram
- Thirukkandalam
- Thirunilai
- Tholavedu
- Thumbakkam
- Vadamadurai
- Vadathillai
- Vannankuppam
- Velagapauram
- Velapakkam
- Vellathukottai
