= Athipattu =

- Suburb of Chennai
- Location in Tamil Nadu, India Athipattu (Tamil Nadu) Athipattu (India)
- Coordinates: 13°15′05.4″N 80°18′23.4″E
- Country: India
- State: Tamil Nadu
- District: Tiruvallur
- Metro: Chennai
- Elevation: 26 m (85 ft)

Population (2001)
  - Total: 8,382

Languages
  - Official: Tamil
- Time zone: UTC+5:30 (IST)
- PIN: 600120
- Telephone code: 044
- Planning agency: CMDA
- Nearest City: Chennai

Athipattu is a census town in Thiruvallur district, Chennai in the state of Tamil Nadu, India. The neighbourhood is served by Athipattu railway station of the Chennai Suburban Railway network. It is a suburb in northern part of Chennai.

North Ennore (including Ennore Port and North Chennai Thermal Power Station) is under the jurisdiction of Athipattu Town Panchayat.

== Demographics ==
According to the 2001 census, Athipattu had a population of 8,382. Males constitute 50% of the population and females 50%. Athipattu has an average literacy rate of 72%, higher than the national average of 59.5%; with 56% of the males and 44% of females literate. 11% of the population is under 6 years of age.
