= Madaharpakkam =

Madharpakkam Madharpakkam
- village
- Location in Tamil Nadu, India Madharpakkam (India)
- Coordinates: 13.4438818°N 80.0017854°E
- Country: India
- State: Tamil Nadu
- District: Tiruvallur
- Taluk: Gummidipoondi (part)
- Elevation: 26 m (85 ft)

Population (2011)
  - Total: 4,737
- Time zone: UTC+5:30 (IST)
- 2011 census code: 628569

Madharpakkam ( மாதர் பாக்கம்) is a village in the Tiruvallur district of Tamil Nadu, India. Part of it is located in the Gummidipoondi taluk. This village is located near Andhra Pradesh border. Weaving was one of the main source of income for very-long years. Due to the downfall of Handloom Industry. People migrated to different places seeking employment. The villagers main source of employment depends on Gummidipoondi sipcot. This village consists of four panchayats namely Madharpakkam, Padirivedu, Manellore and Nemallur. The Government higher secondary school is one of the oldest school in the district. Telugu and Tamil are major languages spoken by people.

== Demographics ==
According to the 2011 census of India, Madaharpakkam has 1171 households. The effective literacy rate (i.e. the literacy rate of population excluding children aged 6 and below) is 79.17%.

Demographics (2011 Census)
	Total	Male	Female
Population	4737	2391	2346
Children aged below 6 years	502	263	239
Scheduled caste	1145	576	569
Scheduled tribe	209	92	117
Literates	3353	1841	1512
Workers (all)	1953	1458	495
Main workers (total)	1725	1311	414
Main workers: Cultivators	55	48	7
Main workers: Agricultural labourers	232	169	63
Main workers: Household industry workers	186	140	46
Main workers: Other	1252	954	298
Marginal workers (total)	228	147	81
Marginal workers: Cultivators	6	2	4
Marginal workers: Agricultural labourers	85	67	18
Marginal workers: Household industry workers	15	5	10
Marginal workers: Others	122	73	49
Non-workers	2784	933	1851
