= Thiruthaleeshwarar Temple =

Thiruthaleeshwarar Temple is located 1.5 kilometer southeast of the Aranvoyal, Thiruvallur District, Tamil Nadu, India.
