= Ellapuram =

Village in Tiruvallur, Tamil Nadu, India

Ellapuram is a village in Tiruvallur district of Tamil Nadu state in India. In 2011, it had a population of 448.
