= Kadambathur =

- Suburb of Chennai
- Location within Tamil Nadu Location within India
- Coordinates: 13.09953°N 79.86158°E
- Country: India
- State: Tamil Nadu
- District: Tiruvallur
- Taluk: Tiruvallur
- Metro: Chennai

Population (2011)
  - Total: 11,235

Languages
  - Official: Tamil
- Time zone: UTC+5:30 (IST)
- PIN: 631203
- Telephone code: 044-2765
- Vehicle registration: TN-20-xxxx
- Lok Sabha constituency: Tiruvallur
- Vidhan Sabha constituency: Tiruvallur

Kadambathur, also spelt Kadambattur, is a town in Tiruvallur district in the Indian state of Tamil Nadu. It is a census town in Tiruvallur taluk. According to the 2011 census, the town has a population of 11,235.
