= Pallipattu block =

Coordinates: 13.33°N 79.45°E

The Pallipattu block is a revenue block in the Tiruvallur district of Tamil Nadu, India. It has a total of 33 panchayat villages.
