= Gummidipoondi block =

Coordinates: 13.40665°N 80.12380°E

The Gummidipoondi block is a revenue block in the Tiruvallur district of Tamil Nadu, India. It has a total of 61 panchayat villages.
