= Tiruttani block =

The Tiruttani block is a revenue block in the Tiruvallur district of Tamil Nadu, India. It has a total of 27 panchayat villages.
