= Poondi block =

The Poondi block is a revenue block in the Tiruvallur district of Tamil Nadu, India. It has a total of 49 panchayat villages.
