= Pallipattu taluk =

Taluk of Tiruvallur district of the Indian state of Tamil Nadu

Coordinates: 13.33°N 79.45°E

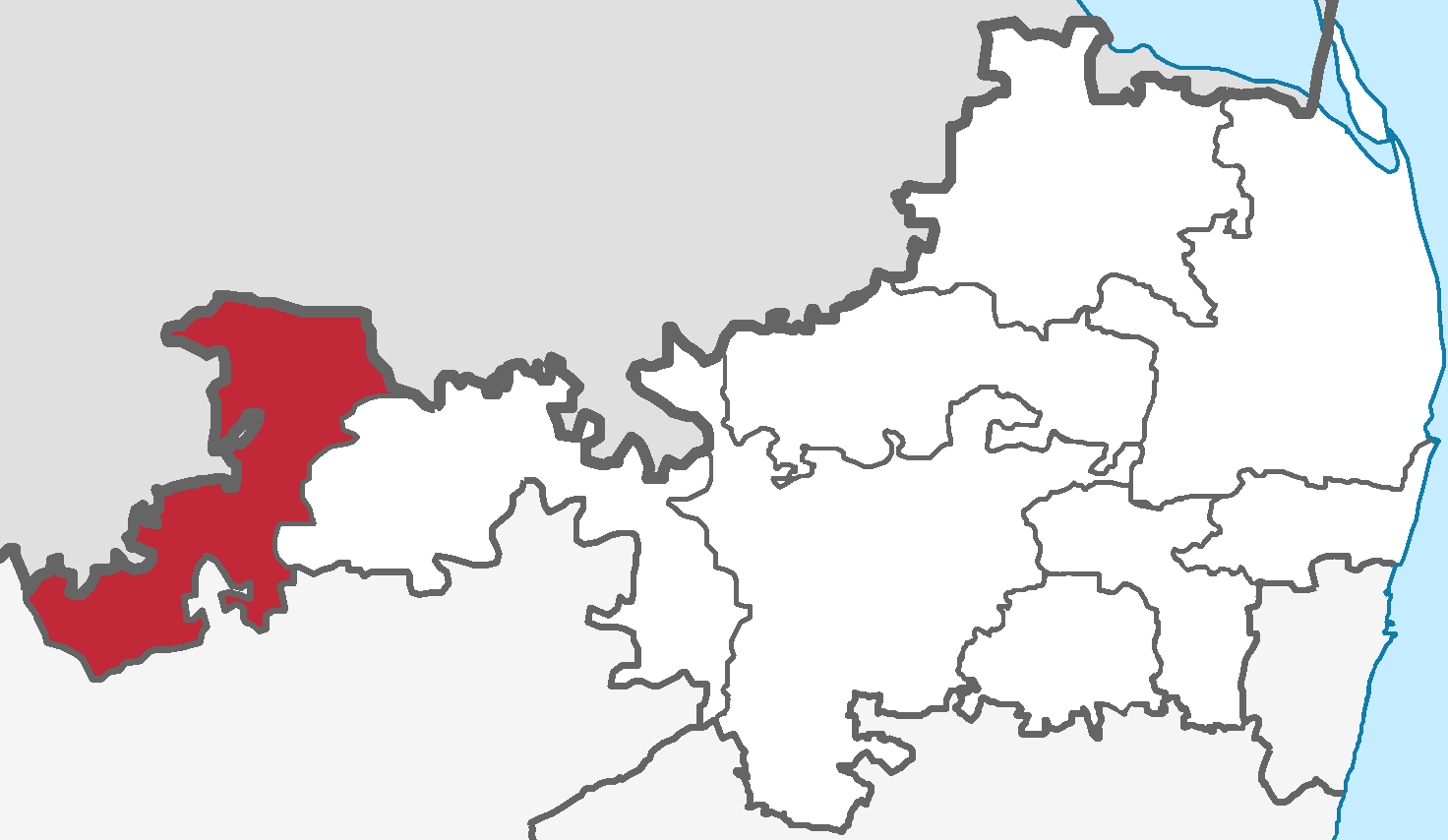
Pallipatu taluk (red) in Tiruvallur District, Tamil Naduz, India

Pallipattu taluk is a taluk of Tiruvallur district of the Indian state of Tamil Nadu. The headquarters of the taluk is the town of Pallipattu.

== Demographics ==
According to the 2011 census, the taluk of Pallipattu had a population of 211,689 with 106,744 males and 104,945 females. There were 983 women for every 1,000 men. The taluk had a literacy rate of 67.7%. Child population in the age group below 6 was 11,666 Males and 10,771 Females.

Taluk Name : Pallipattu taluk
Biggest Town in the Taluk: Pothatturpettai
Blocks : Pallipattu and RK Pet
District : Thiruvallur
State : Tamil Nadu
Language : Tamil
Time zone: IST (UTC+5:30)
Telephone Code / Std440:
