= Sholavaram block =

The Sholavaram block is a revenue block in the Tiruvallur district of Tamil Nadu, India. It has a total of 39 panchayat villages.
