= RK Pet block =

Coordinates: 13°09′56″N 79°26′00″E

The RK Pet block, also known as Rama Krishna Raju Pettai, is a revenue block in the Tiruvallur district of Tamil Nadu, India. It has a total of 38 panchayat villages.
