= Thiruvalangadu block =

The Thiruvalangadu block is a revenue block in the Tiruvallur district of Tamil Nadu, India. It has a total of 42 panchayat villages.
