= Naravarikuppam =

- Town
- Location in Tamil Nadu, India
- Coordinates: 13.2°N 80.17°E
- Country: India
- State: Tamil Nadu
- District: Thiruvallur

Government
  - Type: Town panchayat

Area
  - Total: 5 km^{2} (1.9 sq mi)
- Elevation: 13 m (43 ft)

Population (2011)
  - Total: 20,946
  - Density: 4,200/km^{2} (11,000/sq mi)

Languages
  - Official: Tamil
- Time zone: UTC+5:30 (IST)

Naravarikuppam is a town in Thiruvallur district in the Indian state of Tamil Nadu.

== Geography ==
Red Hills is located at 13.2°N 80.17°E. It has an average elevation of 13 metres (42 feet).

== Demographics ==
As of 2001 India census, Red Hills had a population of 18,327. Males constitute 51% of the population and females 49%. Red Hills has an average literacy rate of 75%, higher than the national average of 59.5%: male literacy is 81%, and female literacy 69%. In Red Hills 12% of the population is younger than six years old.

== Naravarikuppam Municipality ==
Naravarikuppam Municipality was formed by merging villages of Pullion Lyon, Grant Lyon, Vadagarai, Thandalkalani, Athivakkam, Alinjivakkam, Payasambakkam, Theerthagiriyampattu, Palavoyal, Vilangadupakkam, Sendarambakkam, Sirugavoor, Pothur and Pammadukulam with Naravarikuppam Town Panchayat.
