= Tiruvallur block =

The Tiruvallur block is a revenue block in the Tiruvallur district of Tamil Nadu, India. It has a total of 38 panchayat villages.
