= Palavakkam, Tiruvallur =

Village in India

Palavakkam is a village located in Ellapuram block, Uthukottai taluk of Tiruvallur District, India. It is situated about 50 kilometres (31 miles) from Chennai on the Tirupathi Chennai Highways.

The village has three schools: Govt Primary school, Govt Higher Secondary School and Sri Lakshmi Matriculation Higher Secondary School.

The village is bordered by two lakes: Palavakkam and Lachivakkam. The economy revolves around agriculture. The primary languages spoken in the village are Tamil and Telugu. The village has a mosque, two churches and five temples.
