= Pulal block =

Revenue block in Tiruvallur district, Tamil Nadu, India

Puzhal block
- Revenue block
- Interactive map of Puzhal block
- Country: India
- State: Tamil Nadu
- District: Tiruvallur
- Panchayat villages: 7

The Puzhal block is a revenue block in the Tiruvallur district of Tamil Nadu, India. It has a total of seven panchayat villages.
