= Avadi City Municipal Corporation =

Municipal Corporation governing Avadi and neighbouring suburbs

Type
- Type: Municipal corporation

History
- Founded: 19 July 2019; 7 years ago

Leadership
- Mayor: G. Udhayakumar
- Deputy Mayor: S. Suriyakumar
- Municipal Commissioner: R Saranya IAS
- District Collector: Alby John Varghese, IAS

Structure
- Seats: 48
- Political groups: Government (36): SPA (36); DMK (35); CPI(M) (1); Opposition (4): AIADMK (4); Others (8): Independent (5); INC (3)

Meeting place
- Avadi Corporation Office

Website
- https://www.tnurbantree.tn.gov.in/avadi/

Avadi City Municipal Corporation is the civic body governing the City of Avadi, in Chennai Metropolitan Area in the Tiruvallur district of Tamil Nadu, India. Avadi City Municipal Corporation has 48 wards with a population of 344,701 spreads over 65 sq.km. It is headed by an executive mayor and governed by a commissioner. It is one of the four municipal corporations within the Chennai Metropolitan Area, the other three being the central Greater Chennai Corporation, the satellite Tambaram City Municipal Corporation and the Kancheepuram City Municipal Corporation.

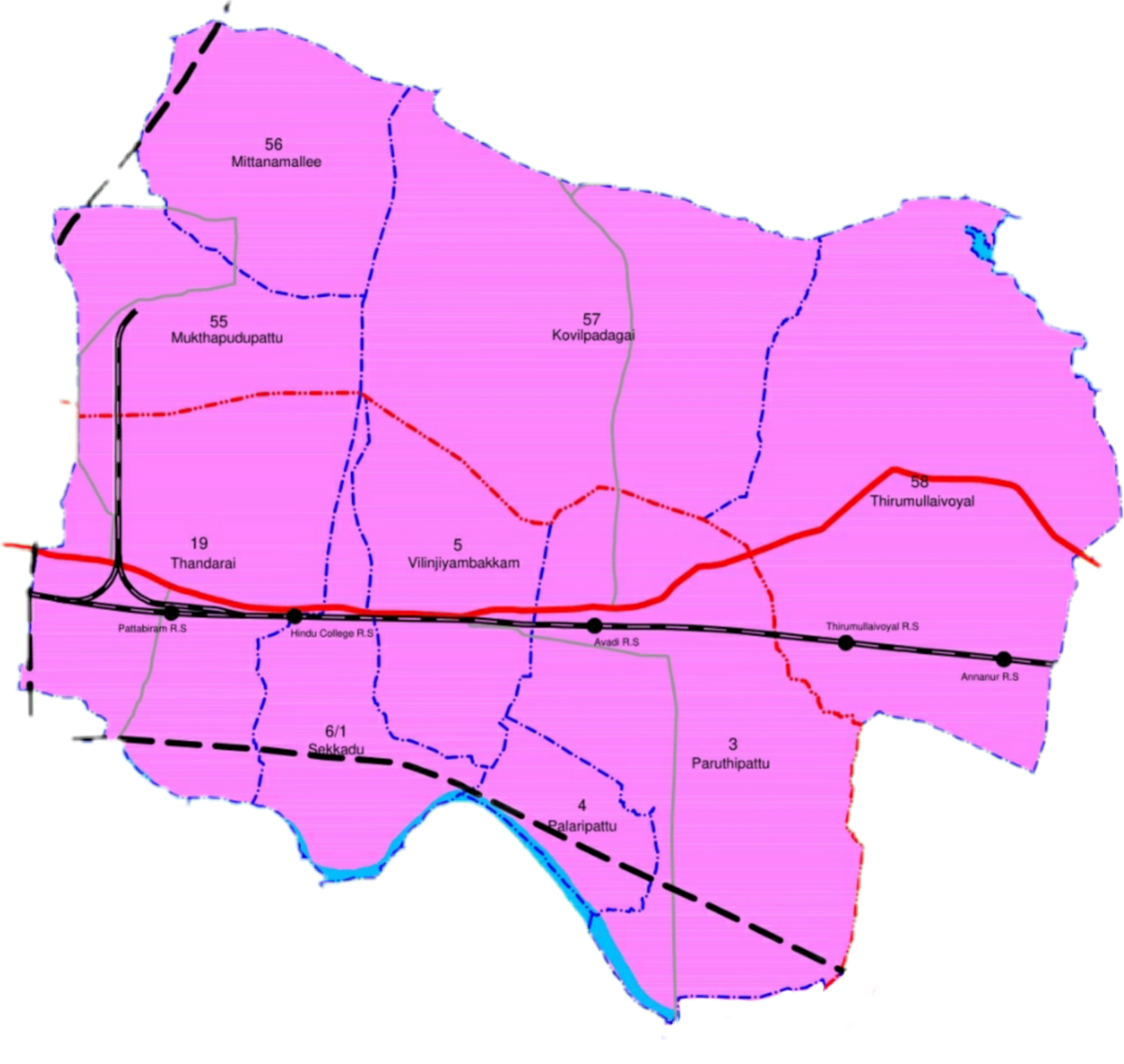

== History and administration ==
Municipal Corporation mechanism in India was introduced during British Rule with formation of municipal corporation in Madras (Chennai) in 1688, later followed by municipal corporations in Bombay (Mumbai) and Calcutta (Kolkata) by 1762.

Avadi Municipal Corporation in Tiruvallur district was formed in year 2019 and is 15th municipal corporation in Tamil Nadu. Avadi Municipal Corporation has 48 wards with a population of 6.1 lakhs spread in 65 km^{2}. The place is driven industrially with location of many key industries.

Avadi Municipal Corporation a Commissioner Mayor, a Council, a Standing Committee, a Wards Committee for facilitating various works.

Currently the Municipal Commissioner is L. Ambika Jain, IAS.

== Areas of Avadi Municipal Corporation ==
Present Avadi Corporation includes all 48 wards of the former Avadi Municipality. This includes Thirumullaivoyal, Kovilpathagai, Mittanamalli, Pattabiram, Paruthipattu, and Avadi (Tamil Nadu Housing Board residential areas).

On January 3, 2025, Tamil Nadu Chief Minister MK Stalin declared Avadi Municipal Corporation to be expanded by merging

- municipalities of Poonamallee, Thiruverkadu, and Thirunindravur along with
- village panchayats of
1. Villivakkam Panchayat Union: (Vellanur, Ayappakkam, Palavedu, Morai)
2. Poonamallee Panchayat Union: (Nemilicheri, Kattupakkam, Kannapalayam, Sorencheri, Nazarathpet, Karunakaracheri, Nadukuthagai, Banaveduthottam, Senneerkuppam, Parivakkam, Varadarajapuram, Agaramel, Meppur).

== Administrative Divisions ==
When Avadi City Municipal Corporation was established, it consisted of 48 wards under 4 zones.

== Wards and councillors ==
Ward	Winner	Party
1	PTMS Praksah	Anna Dravida Munnetra Kazhagam
2	Govindaraj S	Dravida Munnetra Kazhagam
3	Arumugam P	Independent
4	Aasim Raja S.N.	Dravida Munnetra Kazhagam
5	Shenpagavalli R	Dravida Munnetra Kazhagam
6	Bairavi J	Dravida Munnetra Kazhagam
7	Jeyapriya P	Dravida Munnetra Kazhagam
8	Sakthivelan T	Dravida Munnetra Kazhagam
9	G. Udhayakumar [Mayor]	Dravida Munnetra Kazhagam
10	John A	Communist Party of India (Marxist)
11	Parimala S	Marumalarchi Dravida Munnetra Kazhagam
12	Sundari C	Dravida Munnetra Kazhagam
13	Abhishek P	Indian National Congress
14	Rajesh Kumar K	Anna Dravida Munnetra Kazhagam
15	Ammu V	Dravida Munnetra Kazhagam
16	Meenakshi	Anna Dravida Munnetra Kazhagam
17	Sheela	Anna Dravida Munnetra Kazhagam
18	Suhanya S	Dravida Munnetra Kazhagam
19	Sundari K	Dravida Munnetra Kazhagam
20	Divya Tamizhvanan	Dravida Munnetra Kazhagam
21	Veerapandian A	Dravida Munnetra Kazhagam
22	Jothilakshmi N	Dravida Munnetra Kazhagam
23	S. Suryakumar [Deputy Mayor]	Marumalarchi Dravida Munnetra Kazhagam
24	Perumal P.P.	Dravida Munnetra Kazhagam
25	Madurai Arumugam M	Anna Dravida Munnetra Kazhagam
26	Mala P	Dravida Munnetra Kazhagam
27	Venkatesan U	Dravida Munnetra Kazhagam
28	Amutha S	Dravida Munnetra Kazhagam
29	Vimal M	Dravida Munnetra Kazhagam
30	Selvam S	Dravida Munnetra Kazhagam
31	Venkatesan	Dravida Munnetra Kazhagam
32	Sudhakaran R	Dravida Munnetra Kazhagam
33	Hari V	Dravida Munnetra Kazhagam
34	Revathi S	Indian National Congress
35	Geetha U	Dravida Munnetra Kazhagam
36	Yashim Begam H	Dravida Munnetra Kazhagam
37	Ramesh P	Dravida Munnetra Kazhagam
38	Mekala Srinivasan	Indian National Congress
39	Sarala S	Dravida Munnetra Kazhagam
40	Ravi K	Dravida Munnetra Kazhagam
41	Santhi P	Viduthalai Chiruthaigal Katchi
42	Rajendran K	Dravida Munnetra Kazhagam
43	Selvi R	Dravida Munnetra Kazhagam
44	Sumathi D	Dravida Munnetra Kazhagam
45	Sasikala A	Dravida Munnetra Kazhagam
46	Meenakshi K	Dravida Munnetra Kazhagam
47	Azhagu Vijaya	Dravida Munnetra Kazhagam
48	Karthick Kamesh R	Marumalarchi Dravida Munnetra Kazhagam

== Factors driving Avadi Municipal Corporation ==
Avadi Municipal Corporation is driven by following factors:

- Population growth
- Increase in annual income
- Improvement of roads
- Providing drinking water
- Improving landscape
- Improving employment opportunities
- Improving relations between police and public
- Waste management
- Arranging facilities during natural calamities
- Establishing industrial units
- Providing sewage connection

== Avadi Municipal Corporation developments ==
- Avadi Municipal Corporation as part of beautification process installed fountains in various junctions.
- Avadi Municipal Corporation had floated tenders to get piped water facilities to its residents.

== See also ==
- List of municipal corporations in Tamil Nadu
- Tambaram City Municipal Corporation
- Greater Chennai Corporation
