= Poonamallee block =

The Poonamallee block is a revenue block in the Tiruvallur district of Tamil Nadu, India. It has a total of 28 panchayat villages.
