= Kadambathur block =

Coordinates: 13.09953°N 79.86158°E

Kadambathur block is a revenue block in the Tiruvallur district of Tamil Nadu, India. It has a total of 43 panchayat villages.
