= Pudhu Erumaivettipalayam =

New Erumai Vetti Palayam(New BullCull)
- Neighbourhood
- Location within Chennai Location within Tamil Nadu Location within India
- Coordinates: 13.238609°N 80.142332°E
- Country: India
- State: Tamil Nadu
- District: Thiruvallur
- Metro: Chennai
- Elevation: 3 m (9.8 ft)

Languages
  - Official: Tamil
- Time zone: UTC+5:30 (IST)
- PIN: 600067
- Telephone code: 044
- Vehicle registration: TN-20-xxxx & TN-18-xxxx(new)
- Planning agency: CMDA
- City: Chennai
- Lok Sabha constituency: North Chennai
- Vidhan Sabha constituency: Madhavaram

New Erumai Vetti Palayam is a developing residential area in North Chennai, a metropolitan city in Tamil Nadu, India
