= Ellapuram block =

Revenue block in Tiruvallur, Tamil Nadu, India

The Ellapuram block is a revenue block in the Tiruvallur district of Tamil Nadu, India. It has a total of 53 panchayat villages.
