= Pallipattu =

- Town
- Location in Tamil Nadu, India
- Coordinates: 13.33°N 79.45°E
- Country: India
- State: Tamil Nadu
- District: Tiruvallur District

Government
  - Type: Town
  - Body: Town Panchayat

Area
  - Total: 7.7 km^{2} (3.0 sq mi)
- Elevation: 154 m (505 ft)

Population (2011)
  - Total: 8,721
  - Density: 1,100/km^{2} (2,900/sq mi)

Languages
  - Official: Tamil
  - Other: Tamil, Telugu
- Time zone: UTC+5:30 (IST)
- PIN: 631207
- Telephone code: (91)44 - 2784

Pallipattu is a town in Tiruvallur District of Tamil Nadu. It is known for its fertile agricultural lands and the west-to-east flowing Kusasthalai river.

== Geography ==
Pallipat is located at 13.33°N 79.45°E. It has an average elevation of 154 metres (505 feet).

== Demographics ==
As of 2001 India census, Pallipattu had a population of 10,012. Males constitute 50% of the population and females 50%. Pallipattu has an average literacy rate of 71%, compared to the national average of 59.5%: male literacy is 79%, and female literacy is 63%.

== Politics ==
The Andhra Pradesh and Madras Alteration of Boundaries Act, enacted in 1959 by the Parliament of India under the provisions of article 3 of the constitution, went into effect from 1 April 1960. Under the act, Tirutani taluk and Pallipattu sub-taluk of the Chittoor district of Andhra Pradesh were transferred to Madras State in exchange for territories from the Chingelput (Chengalpattu and Salem Districts.

Pallipattu was a state assembly constituency in Tamil Nadu from 1977 to 2007 and after that, Pallipattu became part of Tiruttani (State Assembly Constituency). Also it is part of and Arakkonam (Lok Sabha constituency).

== Transport ==
Nearby Cities/Towns include:

- Pothatturpettai (also known as Podaturpet), 11 kilometres (6.5 miles) away;
- R.K.Pet, 22 kilometres (13.5 miles) away;
- Nagari (A.P), 16 kilometres (10 miles) away;
- Puttur, 27 kilometres (17 miles) away;
- Sholinghur, 28 kilometres (17.5 miles) away;
- Tiruttani, 36 kilometres (22 miles) away;
- Chittoor (A.P), 40 kilometres ( 25 miles) away;
- Arakkonam, 50 kilometres (32 miles) away;
- Tirupathi, (A.P), 51 kilometres (32 miles) away;
- Tiruvallur, 70 kilometres (43.5 miles) away;
- and Chennai, 113 kilometres (70 miles) away.

== Schools ==
There are many schools in the town to provide education to people of Pallipat and surrounding villages. The medium of instruction in these schools are in Tamil, Telugu and English. The schools are :

- St. Mary's Matriculation School
- Government Higher Sec. School
- Government High School For Boys
- SAAI SRI MATRIC.HR.SEC.SCHOOL
- Mother Theresa
- P.U.Elementary School (Main)
- P.U. Ele. School, Dalavaipattadai
- P.U. Ele. School, Anjaneya Nagar
- Government High School For Girls
- st.Mary's High School For Girls

== Organization ==
Deepam welfare Trust india which is committed to provide basic education and healthcare to underprivileged children.& Promoting equal rights and opportunities for a society free from gender discrimination and violence.:

- Deepam Welfare Trust India*
