= Avadi taluk =

Township of Tiruvallur district in the Indian state of Tamil Nadu

Coordinates: 13.12°N 80.1°E

Avadi taluk is a taluk, or township, of Tiruvallur district in the Indian state of Tamil Nadu. The administrative center of the township is Avadi, a neighbourhood of Chennai. The Avadi taluk comes under the Chennai Metropolitan Area.

Avadi, Pattabiram, Thiruninravur are some of the important areas that fall under the jurisdiction of Avadi taluk. The township was formed from Poonamallee taluk and Ambattur taluk in 2015.^{,}
