= Podaturpet =

- Town panchayat
- Podaturpet
- Nickname: PDT
- Location in Tamil Nadu, India
- Coordinates: 13.28308°N 79.48363°E
- Country: India
- State: Tamil Nadu
- District: Tiruvallur

Government
  - Type: Town
  - Body: Town Panchayat

Area
  - Total: 8.86 km^{2} (3.42 sq mi)

Population (2023)
  - Total: 28,040
  - Density: 3,160/km^{2} (8,200/sq mi)

Languages
  - Official: Tamil
- Time zone: UTC+5:30 (IST)
- PIN: 631208
- Telephone code: 91-44
- Vehicle registration: TN-20

Podaturpet (also Podhaturpet, Podhattoorpet or Pothatturpettai) is a Town under Pallipattu (Pallipet) Taluk in Thiruvallur district in the Indian state of Tamil Nadu.

Podaturpet is located between Tiruttani – Pallipattu(Pallipet) and Sholinghur – Nagari (Andhra pradesh) also one of the border towns of Tamilnadu - Andhra Pradesh. This Town panchayat has 18 wards. In local body elections 2022, ADMK won majority by winning 13 wards.

== Demographics ==
As of 2011 India census, Podaturpet had a population of 28,040. Males constitute 51% of the population and females 49%. Podhaturpettai has an average literacy rate of 58%, lower than the national average of 59.5%: male literacy is 70%, and female literacy is 45%. In Podhaturpettai, 16% of the population is under 6 years of age.1) Iyer (Advaita) 2) Osur Veeramuthu lineage 3) Thirupali lineage 4) Ekri lineage 5) Pakapadaya lineage 6) Lingayat lineage

== Politics ==
The Andhra Pradesh and Madras Alteration of Boundaries Act, enacted in 1959 by the Parliament of India under the provisions of article 3 of the constitution, went into effect from 1 April 1960. Under the act, Tiruttani taluk and Pallipattu sub-taluk of the Chittoor district of Andhra Pradesh were transferred to Madras State in exchange for territories from the Chingelput (Chengalpattu)

Tiruttani's assembly constituency is in Arakkonam (Lok Sabha constituency). It was part of Sriperumbudur (Lok Sabha constituency) earlier.

== The Main Industry ==
Weaving is the most important industry and is done by the majority of the people. They are engaged in handloom and powerloom, both types of weaving. The high quality knitwear woven here is distributed to all parts of the country. Next to the textile industry, agriculture is the primary occupation carried out by the majority of the population. Paddy and sugarcane are the major crops.

== Transport ==
Pothatturpettai has transport links to the nearest cities, towns and villages. Pothatturpettai has bus depot and its contains govt buses. The state of Tamil Nadu operates buses to locations including Tiruttani, Pallipattu, Sorakkaiyapettai, Tiruvallur, Poonamallee, Athimanjeripettai, R.K. Pet, Sholingur, Nagari, Walajah, Vellore, Chittoor, and Private buses Operates to Pallipattu, Tiruttani, Arakkonam, Nagari, Puttur, Narayanavanam, Arani, Arcot and Sholinghur

Near by Railway stations

1. Tiruttani Railway station (Distance – 23 km)
2. Nagari Railway station (Distance – 13.5 km)
3. Ekambarakuppam Railway station (Distance – 14.5 km)
4. Arakkonam Junction Railway station (Distance – 35 km)
5. Sholinghur Railway station (Distance – 39 km)
