= Tiruttani taluk =

Taluk of Tiruvallur district of the Indian state of Tamil Nadu

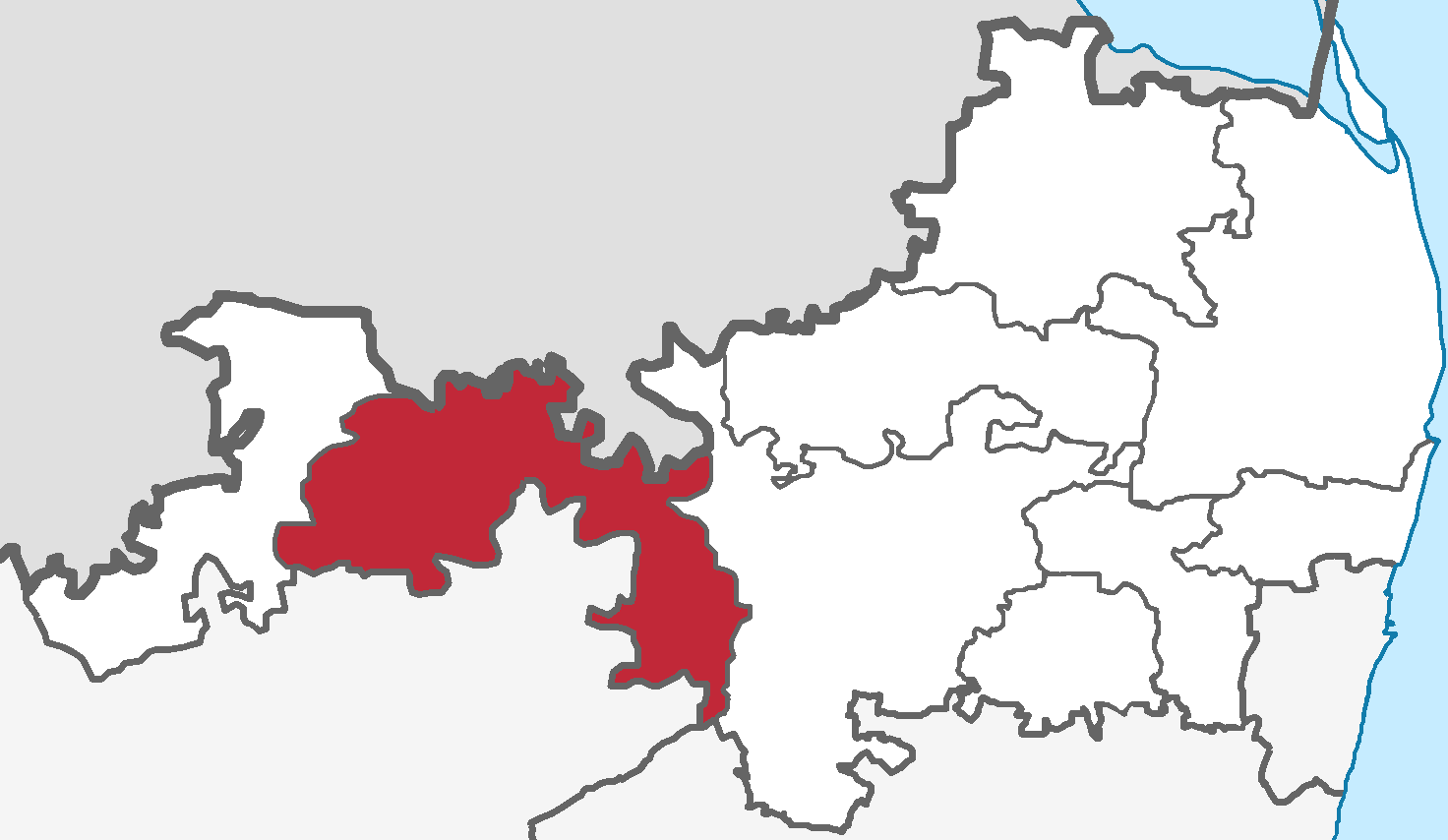
Location of Tiruttani taluk (sub-district) in Tiruvallur district, Tamil Nadu, India

Tiruttani taluk is a taluk of Tiruvallur district of the Indian state of Tamil Nadu. The headquarters of the taluk is the town of Tiruttani. Some parts of the taluk including Tiruttani town falls under the jurisdiction of the Greater Chennai Metropolitan Area.

== Demographics ==
According to the 2011 census, the taluk of Tiruttani had a population of 210,424 with 105,239 males and 105,185 females. There were 999 women for every 1000 men. The taluk had a literacy rate of 66.11. Child population in the age group below 6 was 11,207 males and 10,273 females.
