= Pazhaya Erumaivettipalayam =

KK Thoppu Kalkonam Thoppu
- Neighbourhood
- Interactive map of KK Thoppu
- Country: India
- State: Tamil Nadu
- District: Thiruvallur
- Village: Arani, Tiruvannamalai
- Elevation: 3 m (9.8 ft)

Languages
  - Official: Tamil
- Time zone: UTC+5:30 (IST)
- Telephone code: 04173
- Vehicle registration: TN-25-xxxx & TN-97-xxxx(new)
- Planning agency: CMDA
- City: Chennai
- Lok Sabha constituency: North Chennai
- Vidhan Sabha constituency: Madhavaram

Pazhaya Erumaivettipalayam is a neighbourhood in Thiruvallur, India.
