= Uthukottai =

Neighbourhood in Tiruvallur district, Tamil Nadu, India

Uthukottai Uthukottai
- Town
- Location in Tamil Nadu, India
- Coordinates: 13°20′02″N 79°53′33″E
- Country: India
- State: Tamil Nadu
- District: Tiruvallur
- Established: 1950
- Founder: Government of Tamil Nadu

Government
  - Type: Town Panchayat
  - Body: Uthukottai Town Panchayat

Area
  - Total: 3,400 km^{2} (1,300 sq mi)
  - Rank: 1

Population (2011)
  - Total: 10,639
  - Density: 3.1/km^{2} (8.1/sq mi)

official languages
- Time zone: UTC+5:30 (IST)
- PIN: 602026
- Telephone code: 044
- Vehicle registration: TN-20
- Nearest city: Chennai

Uthukottai is a town and the headquarters of the taluk of the same name in Thiruvallur District of Tamil Nadu, lying on the state's border with Andhra Pradesh, on the banks of the Arani River. This town is the central hub for many nearby towns and villages for their needs of education, markets, shops, businesses, banks, travel, transport and entertainment(Movie Theatres, badminton courts, cricket grounds, Gyms). The town features a channel which helps to direct water from the Krishna River for local irrigation.

The name Uthukottai is a portmanteau of two Tamil words—Uthu(Oottru), or "water Spring" and Kottai (Fort), which signifies one of the Muslim Zamindars old fort in the town.

State Highway 51 crosses Uthukottai, situated between Chennai and Tirupati.

== Demography ==
In the 2001 India census, Uthukkottai had a population of 10,639. Males constituted 50% of the population and females 50%. Uthukkottai had an average literacy rate of 68%, higher than the national average of 59.5%: male literacy was 76%, and female literacy was 59%. In 2001 in Uthukkottai, 12% of the population was under 6 years of age.

In the 2011 census, Uthukkottai recorded 12,623 inhabitants(bilingual Tamil-Telugu). Uthukottai is again a hub for educational institutions for the nearby towns and villages, has several schools. Of them, three are matriculation schools and rest are government and government aided school, a teacher training college, and an Arts & Science college for women at Katchur. Uthukottai is easily connected by Chennai City MTC bus. In fact, it is the shortest route to reach Tirupati.

== Education ==
=== Schools in Uthukottai ===
- Visweshwara Matriculation Higher Secondary School
- Vivekanada Matriculation Higher Secondary School
- Don Bosco Matriculation Higher Secondary School
- Chennai Vidyalaya Matric School
- Vivekananda Vision School (CBSE)
- Government Boys higher secondary school
- Government Girls higher Secondary School
- Kothandaraman Govt. aided School
