= Tiruvallur taluk =

Taluk in Tamil Nadu, India

Thiruvallur taluk is a taluk of Tiruvallur district of the Indian state of Tamil Nadu. The headquarters of the taluk is the town of Thiruvallur. Thiruvallur taluk consists of two panjayat union blocks namely Tiruvallur and Kadambathur.

== Demographics ==
According to the 2011 census, the taluk of Thiruvallur had a population of 403,294 with 202,507 males and 200,787 females. There were 992 women for every 1000 men. The taluk had a literacy rate of 73.09. The child population in the age group below 6 was 19,323 Males and 18,496 Females.
