= RK Pet =

R.K.Pet Ramakrishna Raju Pet (R.K.Pet)
- Taluk
- Interactive map of R.K.Pet
- Coordinates (13.1656378,79.4333946): 13.1656378°N 79.4333946°E
- Country: India
- State: TamilNadu
- District: Thiruvallur
- Pincode: 631303

Rama Krishna Pettai, also known as R K Pet, is a Panchayat in RK Pet taluk, Tiruvallur district, India. Located between Tiruthani and Sholingur This is main village to connect three major different state of cities like Chennai (Tamil Nadu), Bangalore (Karnataka) and Tirupati (Andhra Pradesh).

== Zamindari ==
RK Pet (along with Valkanampudi) was under the Zamindari of the Karlapati family headed by the Zamindarini Karlapati Shayamalambha Devi. The Karlapati family migrated from the Jaggiahpeta Village and settled down in the Madras province in the early 19th century and formed the "Apparao Gardens" in Madras. Karlapati Apparao, son of Zamindarini Karlapati Shayamalambha Devi and Karlapati Satyanarayana, headed many companies in Madras and Hyderabad which includes the Shyamala Industries Corporation, Subhodaya Publications which used to publish famous news papers such as "The Indian Republic", "Praja Patrika". The Subhodaya Publications used to be in the MountRoad, where the present V.S.T Motors and K.C.P Sugars stand today. The Shyamala Industries Corporation, with the head office in Hyderabad, used to have multiple companies under it which includes the TANA Shoe Factory, An Earthen Vase manufacturing company. Karlapati Satyendra Kumar, the eldest son of the Zamindar Karlapati Apparao, headed Kumar Cargo Industries, which used to salvage ships and run a boat building yard.

== Zamindar Karlapati Apparao family ==
The Apparao Gardens in Choolai is an 18-acre land which is centrally located in the old George Town closer to the Madras (Chennai) Central Station. It is where the Zamindar Karlapati Apparao's family reside, in a 200-year-old British bungalow (used to the old British Arms & Ammunitions House). The bungalow also houses a Naga Devatha Temple which is even older. The Zamindar Karlapati Apparao family owned a fleet of cars which include the "Rolls Royce". The Zamindar Karlapati Apparao have seven sons and five daughters and their family who now own & take care of the family heritage and holdings.

== Schools ==
- Govt. boys higher secondary school
- Govt. girls higher secondary school
- SBVM School
- Billabong high international school
- Vethathiri Maharishi Higher Secondary School
- Sri Ayyan Vidyashram Hr.Sec School

== Temples ==
- Sundara raja Perumal Temple
- Visaleeswarar Temple (OLD TEMPLE AT AD 600)
- Ponniyamman Temple
- Sundara Vinayagar Temple
- Anjaneya Temple
- தொட்டிச்சி அம்மன்
- Ellai amman temple (it is kuladeivam for Manikka, Sengothi, Kulsanaam, Kaalatheswarar Gotra of Sengunthar Kaikola Mudaliyar)

== Churches ==
CSI Pastorate Village churches:

- CSI RK Pet Pudhur Church (Shanti Nilayam Campus), Estd. 1901 AD.
