= Gummidipoondi taluk =

Taluk of Tiruvallur district of the Indian state of Tamil Nadu

Coordinates: 13.40665°N 80.12380°E

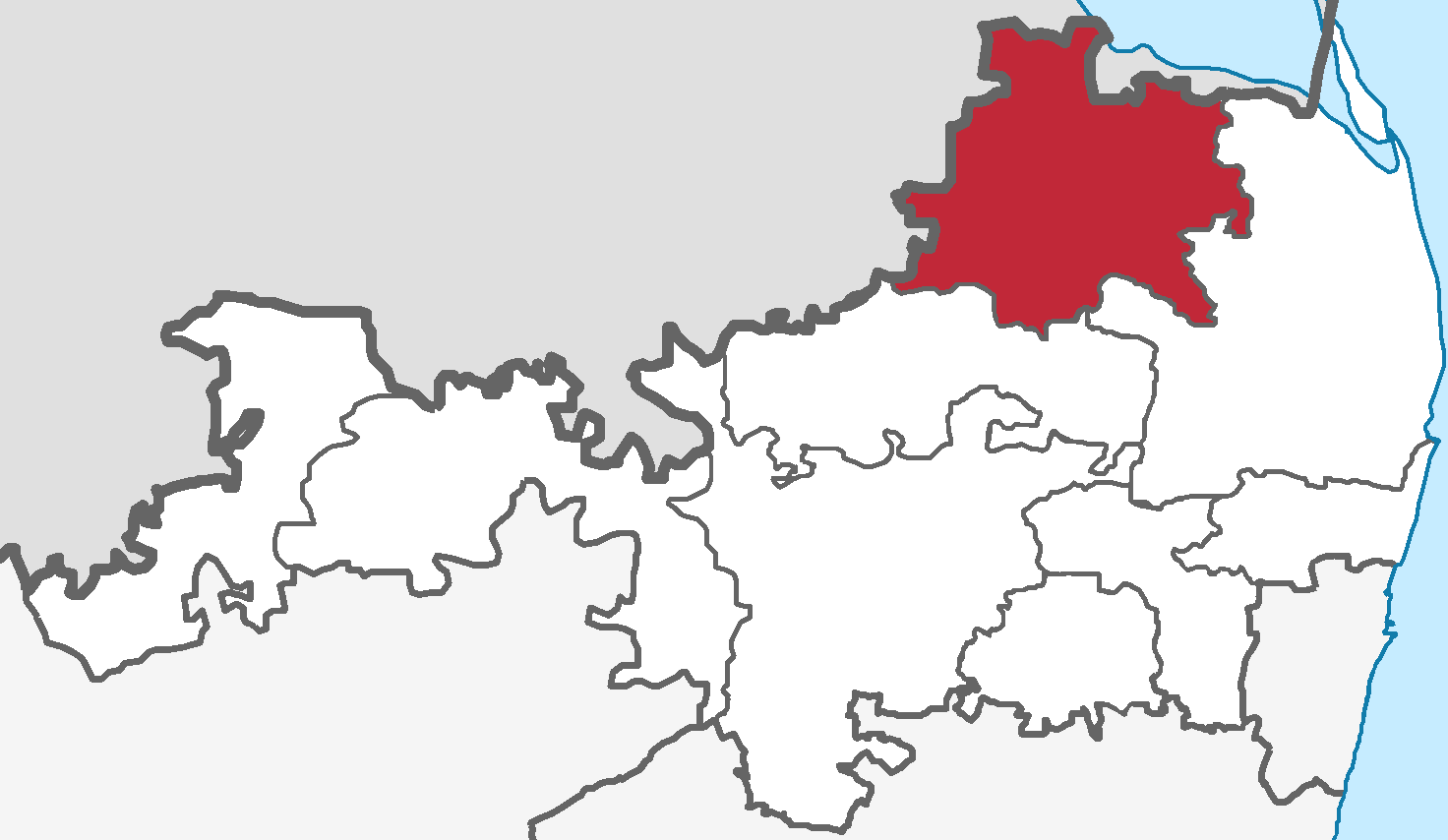
Location of Gumminipoondi taluk (sub-district) in Tiruvallur district, Tamil Nadu, India

Gummidipoondi taluk is a taluk of Tiruvallur district of the Indian state of Tamil Nadu. The headquarters of the taluk is the town of Gummidipoondi.

== Demographics ==
According to the 2011 census, the taluk of Gummidipoondi had a population of 190,548 with 95,833 males and 94,715 females. There were 988 women for every 1,000 men. The taluk had a literacy rate of 64.49%. The child population in the age group below 6 years consisted of 10,232 males and 9,986 females.
