= Tiruvallur district =

Thiruvallur district
- District of Tamil Nadu
- Tiruvallur district Location in Tamil Nadu
- Coordinates: 13°8′26.16″N 79°54′21.6″E
- Country: India
- State: Tamil Nadu
- Region: Pallava Nadu, Tondai Nadu
- Headquarters: Tiruvallur
- Talukas: Avadi; RK Pet; Ponneri; Gummidipoondi; Uthukottai; Tiruvallur; Poonamallee; Tiruttani; Pallipattu

Government
  - District Collector: M. Prathap, I.A.S
  - Superintendent of Police: R. V. Varun Kumar, I.P.S
  - Member of Parliament: Sasikanth Senthil (Congress–DMK Alliance)

Area
  - Total: 3,423 km^{2} (1,322 sq mi)

Population (2011)
  - Total: 2,721,363
  - Rank: 4
  - Density: 795.0/km^{2} (2,059/sq mi)

Languages
  - Official: Tamil
- Time zone: UTC+5:30 (IST)
- PIN: 602001.600XXX,601XXX,631XXX
- Telephone code: 044
- Vehicle registration: TN-12, 13, 18, 20.
- Per Capita Income (2022-23): ₹430,950 (US$5,482.51)
- Largest metro: Avadi
- Sex ratio: 983 ♂/♀
- Literacy: 83.33%
- Central location: 13°8′N 79°54′E
- Nominal GDP(2022-23): ₹170,946.18 crore (US$21.75 billion)
- Avg. summer temperature: 37.9 °C (100.2 °F)
- Avg. winter temperature: 18.5 °C (65.3 °F)
- Website: tiruvallur.nic.in

Thiruvallur district, also spelled as Tiruvallur district, is one of the 38 districts (an administrative district) in the Indian state of Tamil Nadu. The fast developing city of Tiruvallur is the district headquarters. The district has a mixture of urban and rural characteristics. The eastern part of the district has urban characteristics due to the proximity to the state capital Chennai while the Northern part of the district has influence of Andhra culture due to its position. In 2011, the district had a population of 3,728,104 with a sex-ratio of 987 females for every 1,000 males. The entire district (except Pallipattu taluk) is part of the Chennai Metropolitan Area.

The district has been divided into three revenue divisions viz, Tiruvallur, Tiruttani and Ponneri. There are four taluks under Tiruvallur division, two under Tiruttani divisions and two under Ponneri division. There are 46 firkas and 820 revenue villages. Likewise there are 12 blocks, five municipalities and ten town panchayats which implement rural development activities.

== Etymology ==
The name "Tiruvallur" is supposedly derived from the Tamil sentence "tiru evvull?" from "Tiru" (highness – a common prefix in South India for temple towns or cities) and "evvull" (where do I sleep?). Thus, Tiruvallur refers to a place/town where the god Veera Raghavar asked a saint for a place to sleep for a night.

Tiruvallur was originally known as Tiru-evallur, which specifies the sleeping position of the Vishnu or "Perumal", in the Veeraraghava Temple of Tiruvallur. Later, people began to refer to it by names such as Trivellore and Tiruvallur. Today, Tiruvallur is well known, one of the reasons being the Veeraraghava Temple, where Amavasya (new moon) is considered an auspicious day for the lord and so for the people of the town.

== Governance ==
=== Revenue divisions and taluks ===
Tiruvallur District consists of three revenue divisions and nine taluks:

- Ponneri Revenue Division – Ponneri taluk, Gummidipoondi taluk
- Tiruvallur Revenue Division – Uthukkottai taluk, Tiruvallur taluk, Poonamallee taluk, Avadi taluk
- Tiruttani Revenue Division – Tiruttani taluk, Pallipattu taluk, RK Pet taluk

=== Revenue blocks ===
The following are the Panchayat Unions / revenue blocks of the district.

- Ellapuram
- Gummidipoondi
- Kadambathur
- Minjur
- Pallipattu
- Poonamallee
- Poondi
- Pulal
- R.K.Pet
- Sholavaram
- Tiruvallur
- Tiruttani
- Thiruvalangadu
- Villivakkam

=== Municipal corporation and municipalities ===
There is one municipal corporation in Tiruvallur District.

- Avadi

There are five municipalities:

- Tiruvallur
- Ponneri
- Thiruthani
- Veppampattu
- Naravarikuppam (Red Hills)

The following are the Town Panchayats of the district.

- Thirumazhisai
- Uthukottai
- Gummidipoondi
- Minjur
- Arani
- Pallipattu
- Pothatturpettai
- Athipattu (including North Ennore)
- Padianallur
- Kadambathur

Proposed Municipalities:

- Thirumazhisai
- Minjur
- Gummidipoondi

Proposed Town Panchayat:

- Sholavaram
- Pulicat
- Ramakrishnarajapet
- Thiruvalangadu
- Poondi
- Ellapuram

== Politics ==
District	No.	Constituency	Name	Party	Alliance	Remarks
Tiruvallur	1	Gummidipoondi	S. Vijayakumar	TVK	TVK+	
Tiruvallur	2	Ponneri	M. S. Ravi	TVK	TVK+	
Tiruvallur	3	Tiruttani	G. Hari	AIADMK	AIADMK+	Supported TVK; Later declared support for EPS
Tiruvallur	4	Thiruvallur	T. Arunkumar	TVK	TVK+	
Tiruvallur	5	Poonamallee (SC)	R. Prakasam	TVK	TVK+	
Tiruvallur	6	Avadi	R. Ramesh Kumar	TVK	TVK+	

== Geography ==
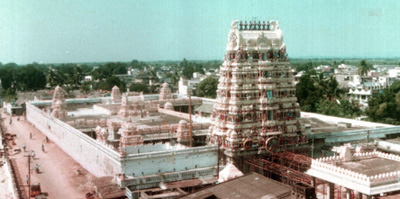
The Veera Raghava Swami Temple in Tiruvallur

It is bounded on the north by Tirupati and Chittoor districts of Andhra Pradesh state, on the east by the Bay of Bengal, on the southeast by Chennai district, on the south by Kanchipuram districts, on the northwest by Vellore and on the west by Ranipet district. The coastal region of the district is mostly flat; but in the other parts it is undulating and even hilly in some places.

The northern taluks of the district like Ponneri, Uttukkottai, Gummidipundi etc. do not have much to offer from the scenic point of view. In the Tiruttani taluk, a number of hillocks are found scattered. The soil of the district is mostly sandy, mixed with soda or other alkali or stony. Rocks found in and near the surface are in detached masses. Hence, the soil can't be termed as very fertile. The soil found nearer the sea coast is of the inferior ericaceous type which is most suited for raising casuarinas plants. No mineral of any importance is available in the district. There are not many hills of any considerable height in this district. A few conical hills or ridges of small elevation exist like the St. Thomas Mount. Certain hillocks are found in Tiruttani. Most of the hills and hillocks are rocky and no verdant vegetation is seen in the slopes of these hills. The area under forests in this district is quite meager.

The average normal rainfall of the district is 1104 mm. Out of which 52% has been received during Northeast Monsoon period and 41% has been received during Southwest Monsoon period.

== Demographics ==
Historical population
Year	Pop.	±% p.a.
1901	611,211	—
1911	655,199	+0.70%
1921	688,499	+0.50%
1931	751,567	+0.88%
1941	825,255	+0.94%
1951	888,691	+0.74%
1961	981,733	+1.00%
1971	1,298,028	+2.83%
1981	1,718,487	+2.85%
1991	2,238,583	+2.68%
2001	2,754,756	+2.10%
2011	3,728,104	+3.07%

According to the 2011 census, Thiruvallur district had a population of 3,728,104 with a sex-ratio of 987 females for every 1,000 males, much above the national average of 929. 405,669 were under the age of six (208,449 males and 197,220 females). Scheduled Castes and Scheduhled Tribes accounted for 22.04% and 1.27% of the population respectively.

The average literacy rate of the district was 74.88%, compared to the national average of 72.99%.

The district had 946,949 households. There were 1,538,054 workers, comprising 60,436 cultivators, 173,150 main agricultural labourers, 41,742 in house hold industries, 972,590 other workers, 290,136 marginal workers, 13,008 marginal cultivators, 97,436 marginal agricultural labourers, 16,498 marginal workers in household industries and 163,194 other marginal workers.

Tamil is the official language and there are some white collar English workers and north-Indian workers in the industrial corridor of Gummadipoondi in the district. Telugu minority people also speak Telugu in the district, since the time of the Madras presidency. Telugu residents are settled in the district at 1:20 ratio of the district's population.

After the addition of large parts of the district to Chennai district, in 2021, the district has a population of 2,721,363 of which rural was 2,025,361 and urban 696,012.

Religions in Thiruvallur District
1. Hinduism (94.0%)
2. Christianity (3.27%)
3. Islam (2.73%)
4. Other (0.68%)

== Economy ==
Tiruvallur district is one of the fastest developing districts in Tamil Nadu in terms of industrial development. The district has many leading industries like Kamarajar Port, North Chennai Thermal Power Station, National Thermal Power Corporation, L&T Ship Build, NIOT, ITC, IOCL, HPCL, BPCL, Hindustan Motors and CPCL, Ennore (Tondiarpet). It also has the Ennore Thermal Power Station and the Avadi tank factory.

In retail spending, the Thiruvallur district emerges third in India, only after Noida and SW Delhi surpassing Bangalore and Mumbai by a clear margin.

The district has nine industrial estates, six developed by the government and three by private organisations.

Government industrial estates

- Electrical Industrial Estate, Kakalur.
- SIDCO Industrial Estate, Kakalur
- Petrochemical Industrial Estate, Vichoor
- SIDCO Industrial Estate, R.K. Pet
- SIDCO Industrial Estate, Gummidipoondi
- SIDCO Industrial Estate, Thirumazhisai

Private industrial estates

- M.M.Industrial Estate, Alapakkam
- Moccaram Industries, Velappan Chavadi
- Ekambara Naicker Industrial Estate, Alapakkam

The district has 16,940 small scale industries, notable among them being food, wood, textile, chemical, engineering, non-metallic and leather industries.

== See also ==
- List of districts of Tamil Nadu
- Thiruthaleeshwarar Temple
