= Orathanadu block =

Orathanadu block, which is pronounced as 'Oraththanaadu' block, is a revenue block in the Orathanadu taluk of Thanjavur district, Tamil Nadu, India. There are a total of 58 villages in this block.

== List of Panchayat Villages ==
SI.No	Panchayat Village
1	Adanakottai
2	Alivoikkal
3	Ambalapattu North
4	Ambalapattu South
5	Arumulai
6	Avidanalla Vijayapuram
7	Ayangudi
8	Chinnaponnapur
9	Cholapuram
10	Ichankottai
11	Kakkarai
12	Kakkarakottai
13	Kannathangudi East
14	Kannathangudi West
15	Kannugudi East
16	Kannugudi West
17	Karaimeendarkottai
18	Karukkadipatti
19	Kattukurichi
20	Kavarapattu
21	Keela Ulur
22	Keelavannipattu
23	Kovilur
24	Kulamangalam
25	Mandalakkottai
26	Mela Ulur
27	Moorthiambalpuram
28	Mullurpattikadu
29	Nadur
30	Neivasal South
31	Okkanadu Keelaiyur
32	Okkanadu Melaiyur
33	Orantharayankudikadu
34	Pachiyur
35	Palampudur
36	Panjanathikottai
37	Paruthikottai
38	Peikarambankottai
39	Ponnappur East
40	Ponnappur West
41	Poovathur
42	Poyyundarkottai
43	Pudur
44	Pulavankadu
45	Ragavambalpuram
46	Sethurayankudikadu
47	Thalayamangalam
48	Thekkur
49	Thelungan Kudikadu
50	Thennamanadu
51	Thirumangalakkottai(east)
52	Thirumangalakkottai(west)
53	Thondarampattu
54	Vadakkur North
55	Vadakkur South
56	Vadaseri
57	Vandayaniruppu
58	Vellur
