= Thiruvonam block =

Thiruvonam block is a revenue block in Thanjavur district, Tamil Nadu, India. There are a total of 30 villages and 15 Union wards in this block. Before 2011 Thiruvonam is an MLA constituency now it is degraded into union block.Agriculture is the major occupation of this block.

== List of Panchayat villages ==
SI.No	Panchayat Village
1	Adambai
2	Akkaraivattam
3	Ammangudi
4	Kaduvettividuthy
5	Kariyaviduthi
6	Kavalipatti
7	Kayavoor
8	Kilamangalam
9	Neiveli North
10	Neiveli South
11	Nemmeli Thippiyakudi
12	Panikondanviduthi
13	Pathirankottai North
14	Pathirankottai South
15	Pinnaiyur
16	Poyyundarkudikadu
17	Sankaranatharkudikadu
18	Senniaviduthy
19	Sillathur
20	Sivaviduthi
21	Solagankudikadu
22	Thaligaividuthi
23	Therkukottai
24	Thirunallur
25	Thoppuviduthy
26	Unjiyaviduthi
27	Vadakkukottai
28	Vengarai
29	Vettikadu
30	Vettuvakkottai
