= Vengara =

Vengara may refer to:

== Places ==
- Vengara, Malappuram district, Kerala, India
- Vengara (Kannur district), Kerala, India
- Vengara (State Assembly constituency), state legislative assembly constituencies in Kerala state
- Vengarai, Tamil Nadu, India
- Vengarai Periakottainadu, Tamil Nadu, India
- Vengarai Thippanvidudhi, Tamil Nadu, India

== Surname ==
- Ibrahim Vengara (born 1941), politician
