= T. M. Thailappan =

Indian politician

Member of the Legislative Assembly of Tamil Nadu
- In office 1977–1980
- Preceded by: L. Ganesan
- Succeeded by: T. Veerasamy
- Constituency: Orathanadu

Personal details
- Party: Dravida Munnetra Kazhagam
- Occupation: Politician

T. M. Thailappan is an Indian politician and a former Member of the Legislative Assembly (MLA) of Tamil Nadu. He was elected to the Tamil Nadu Legislative Assembly from the Orathanad Assembly constituency as a Dravida Munnetra Kazhagam (DMK) candidate in the 1977 state assembly election.

== Electoral Performance ==
1977 Tamil Nadu Legislative Assembly election: Orathanad
Party	Candidate	Votes	%	±%
DMK	T. M. Thailappan	31,866	35.50%	▼26.49
INC	N. Sivagananam	26,156	29.14%	▼3.93
AIADMK	T. Veeraswamy	25,299	28.18%	New
JP	A. Murugesan	5,079	5.66%	New
Independent	M. Thiruvengadam	1,368	1.52%	New
Margin of victory		5,710	6.36%	−22.56%
Turnout		89,768	78.21%	−4.95%
Registered electors		116,133		
DMK hold		Swing	-26.49%	
