= Pinnayur =

Pinnayur may refer to:

- Pinayur, a village in Uthiramerur taluk, Kanchipuram district, Tamil Nadu, India
- Pinnayur East, a village in Thiruvonam taluk of Thanjavur district, Tamil Nadu.
- Pinnayur West, a village in Thiruvonam taluk of Thanjavur district, Tamil Nadu
