= Ayangudi =

Ayangudi may refer to:

- Ayangudi, Cuddalore, town in Cuddalore district of Tamil Nadu, India
- Ayangudi, Thanjavur, village in Orathanadu talik, Thanjuvar district of Tamil Nadu, India
