= Vadaseri South =

- Village
- Interactive map of Vadaseri South
- Coordinates: 10°34′7″N 79°22′47″E
- Country: India
- State: Tamil Nadu
- District: Thanjavur
- Taluk: Orathanadu
- Headquarters: Thanjavur

Government
  - Type: Panchayat
  - Body: Vadaseri Panchayat
  - Panchayat President: So.Ma.Nandhakumar
  - Panchayat Union Councilor: Rajasekaran Manickam

Area
  - Total: 12.2826 km^{2} (4.7423 sq mi)
  - Vadaseri North: 6.3405 km^{2} (2.4481 sq mi)
  - Vadaseri South: 5.8521 km^{2} (2.2595 sq mi)

Population (2011)
  - Total: 4,810
  - Density: 401/km^{2} (1,040/sq mi)

Languages
  - Official: Tamil
- Time zone: UTC+5:30 (IST)
- ZIP Code: 614905
- Vehicle registration: TN 49
- Website: vadaseri.org

Vadaseri South is an important village in the Orathanadu taluk of Thanjavur district in the Indian state of Tamil Nadu. Vadaseri comes under the Orathanadu constituency which elects a member to the Tamil Nadu Legislative Assembly once every five years and it is a part of the Thanjavur (Lok Sabha constituency) which elects its Member of Parliament (MP) once in five years. The village is administered by the Vadaseri panchayat, which covers an area of 12.2826 km^{2} (4.7423 sq mi). As of 2011, the village had a population of 4,810. Most of the population belongs to the Agamudaiyar-Thevar Community who maintain strong cultural and social bindings.The village is a part of the fertile Cauvery delta region and agriculture is the major occupation. Roadways and railways are the major mode of transportation to Vadaseri, the nearest railway stations are Mannargudi and Pattukkottai and the nearest international airport is Tiruchirapalli Airport, located 100 km (62 mi) away from the village, in the city of Tiruchirappalli.

== Demographics ==
Vadaseri is a small agricultural village in Thanjavur District, the food grain and temple district of Tamil Nadu, India. Vadaseri is located about 35 km, South-East of Thanjavur. It has a population of about 10,000.

== Location ==
Vadaseri 10° 34′ 7″ N, 79° 22′ 47″ E is located along the southeastern coast of India in the East-central region of Tamil Nadu, in the general Kaveri River delta area. Vadaseri is about 42 km from the history city Thanjavur, 14 km east of Orathanadu, 16 km north of Pattukkottai and 15 km south of Mannargudi. It lies on SH146 Mannargudi - Pattukkottai - Sethubhavachatram Road. Vadaseri is the last village lies in the boarder of Thanjavur district. The coast of the Bay of Bengal is just 30 km away.

== Area ==
About 3 km radius.

== Population ==
Vadaseri has a population of about 10,000.

== Administration ==
Vadaseri comes under Orathanadu Taluk and Thanjavur district.
