= Thenammanadu South =

Thenammanadu South Thennamanadu South
- village
- Country: India
- State: Tamil Nadu
- District: Thanjavur
- Taluk: Orathanadu

Population (2001)
  - Total: 3,611

Languages
  - Official: Tamil
- Time zone: UTC+5:30 (IST)

Thennamanadu South is a village in the Orathanadu taluk of Thanjavur district, Tamil Nadu, India.

== Demographics ==
As per the 2001 census, Thennamanadu South had a total population of 3611 with 1712 males and 1899 females. The sex ratio was 1109. The literacy rate was 66.43.
