= T. Veeraswamy =

Indian politician

T. Veerasamy
- Born: Thaandavamurthi Veerasamy; Vellur, Thanjavur district, Tamilnadu
- Occupation: politician

Thaandavamurthi Veeraswamy is an Indian politician and former Member of the Legislative Assembly of Tamil Nadu. He was elected to the Tamil Nadu legislative assembly as an Indian National Congress (Indira) candidate from Orathanad constituency in 1980 election, and as an Anna Dravida Munnetra Kazhagam candidate in 1984 election.

T. Veerasamy, also called as Vellurar was born at Vellur of Orathanadu taluk in Thanjavur district in Tamil Nadu as a third son and fifth Child of Late M.Thandavamurthi Athiyaman, Sornathammal in a Kallar family. His father was the Nattamai of Vellur Nadu.
