= Vedanayagipuram =

- village
- Country: India
- State: Tamil Nadu
- District: Thanjavur
- Taluk: Orathanadu

Population (2001)
  - Total: 312

Languages
  - Official: Tamil
- Time zone: UTC+5:30 (IST)

Vedanayagipuram is a village in the Orathanadu taluk of Thanjavur district, Tamil Nadu, India.

== Demographics ==
At the 2001 census, Vedanayagipuram had a total population of 312 with 156 males and 156 females. The sex ratio was 1.000. The literacy rate was 56.09.
