= Palli Paruvathile =

2017 Indian film by Vasudev Bhaskar

- Theatrical release poster
- Directed by: Vasudev Bhaskar
- Written by: Vasudev Bhaskar
- Produced by: D. Velu
- Starring: Nandhan Ram; Venba
- Cinematography: Vinothkumar
- Edited by: Suresh Urs
- Music by: Vijay Narayanan
- Production company: VKPT Creations
- Release date: 15 December 2017
- Country: India
- Language: Tamil

Palli Paruvathile (transl. At school age) is a 2017 Indian Tamil-language romantic drama film directed by Vasudev Bhaskar and starring Nandhan Ram and Venba with K. S. Ravikumar, Urvashi and R. K. Suresh in supporting roles.

== Plot ==
The film is about how two Plus 2 students fall in love against their families interest.

== Cast ==
- Nandhan Ram as Kalai
- Venba as Kani
- K. S. Ravikumar as Sarangan
- Urvashi as Kalai's mother
- Thambi Ramaiah
- R. K. Suresh as Kani's uncle
- Ganja Karuppu as Peon
- Ponvannan as Kani's father
- Sujatha Sivakumar
- Pasanga Sivakumar as Teacher
- E. Ramdoss
- Nanditha Jennifer (special appearance)
- Sukirthan Raj (cameo appearance)

== Production ==
This film marks the debut of Sirpy's son Nandhan Ram and the lead debut of Kattradhu Thamizh-fame Venba. This film marks the second directorial of Vasudev Bhaskar, who previously worked as a producer for Vedha (2008) and a director for Marupadiyum Oru Kadhal (2012). The film's story is based on a few incidents from Vasudev Bhaskar's life at Iluppai Thoppu Secondary School in Ambalapattu, Thanjavur district, where the film was shot in forty days. Pasanga Sivakumar's role in the film is based on the director's teacher Sargam. The director had an idea of making a film in his school since the 10th grade.

== Soundtrack ==
The music is composed by newcomer Vijay Narayanan, who formerly worked as an assistant to Ilaiyaraaja and A. R. Rahman. The lyrics are written by Vairamuthu, Vasu Kokila and M. C. Saradha.

== Reception ==
=== Critical response ===
A critic from The Times of India rated the film 1 1/2 out of 5 and wrote that "The writing and filmmaking are so archaic that the film turns into a test of patience". A critic from Deccan Chronicle wrote that "The film takes us to nostalgic memories of our school days. But too much of forced melodrama and tragic events mar the interest. The director could have infused freshness in screenplay. A bit of trimming would have helped too".
