= Vadapathy (disambiguation) =

Vadapathy may refer to:

- Vadapathy
- Neyveli Vadapathy
- Arasarkulam Vadapathy
