= R. Vaithilingam =

Indian politician

Member of Parliament, Rajya Sabha
- In office 30 June 2016 – 7 May 2021
- Succeeded by: K. R. N. Rajeshkumar
- Constituency: Tamil Nadu

Minister of Housing & Urban Development Government of Tamil Nadu
- In office 16 May 2011 – 23 May 2016
- Chief Minister: J. Jayalalithaa; O. Panneerselvam

Minister of Forest & Environment Government of Tamil Nadu
- In office 2 March 2002 – 12 May 2006
- Chief Minister: J. Jayalalithaa

Minister of Rural Industries Government of Tamil Nadu
- In office 21 September 2001 – 2 March 2002
- Chief Minister: O. Panneerselvam

Minister of Industries Government of Tamil Nadu
- In office 14 May 2001 – 21 September 2001
- Chief Minister: J. Jayalalithaa

Member of the Tamil Nadu Legislative Assembly
- Incumbent
- Assumed office 12 May 2021
- Preceded by: M. Ramachandran
- Constituency: Orathanadu
- In office 13 May 2001 – 19 May 2016
- Preceded by: P. Rajamanickam
- Succeeded by: M. Ramachandran
- Constituency: Orathanadu

Thanjavur District head of AIADMK
- In office 2020–2022

Deputy Co-ordinator of AIADMK
- In office 21 August 2017 – 23 June 2022 Serving with K. P. Munusamy
- Preceded by: position established
- Succeeded by: position abolished

Personal details
- Party: DMK (since 2026)
- Other political affiliations: AIADMK (until 2022); Independent (2022–2026)

R. Vaithilingam is an Indian politician and former Rajya Sabha member from the state of Tamil Nadu. He is a Member of the legislative assembly from Orathanad constituency.

Vaithilingam was Minister for Housing and Urban Development in the Government of Tamil Nadu prior to his defeat by M. Ramachandran in the state assembly election of 2016. The defeat was described as a giant-killing outcome. As a cadre of the All India Anna Dravida Munnetra Kazhagam (AIADMK), he had been elected to the Tamil Nadu Legislative Assembly from the Orathanad constituency in 2001, 2006, 2011 nd 2021. And in 2026 from DMK.

On 3 June 2016, he was elected unopposed to the Rajya Sabha, along with three others of his party.

== Expulsion from AIADMK ==
On 11 July 2022, R. Vaithilingam along with O. Panneerselvam were expelled as primary members of the party for "anti-party" activities by the AIADMK General Council.
