= Therkukottai =

- village
- Country: India
- State: Tamil Nadu
- District: Thanjavur
- Taluk: Orathanadu

Population (2001)
  - Total: 927

Languages
  - Official: Tamil
- Time zone: UTC+5:30 (IST)

Therkukottai is a village in the Orathanadu taluk of Thanjavur district, Tamil Nadu, India.

== Demographics ==
As per the 2002 census, Therkukottai had a total population of 927 with 435 males and 492 females. The sex ratio was 1131. The literacy rate was 60.54.
