= Peikarambankottai =

Peikkarumbankottai
- village
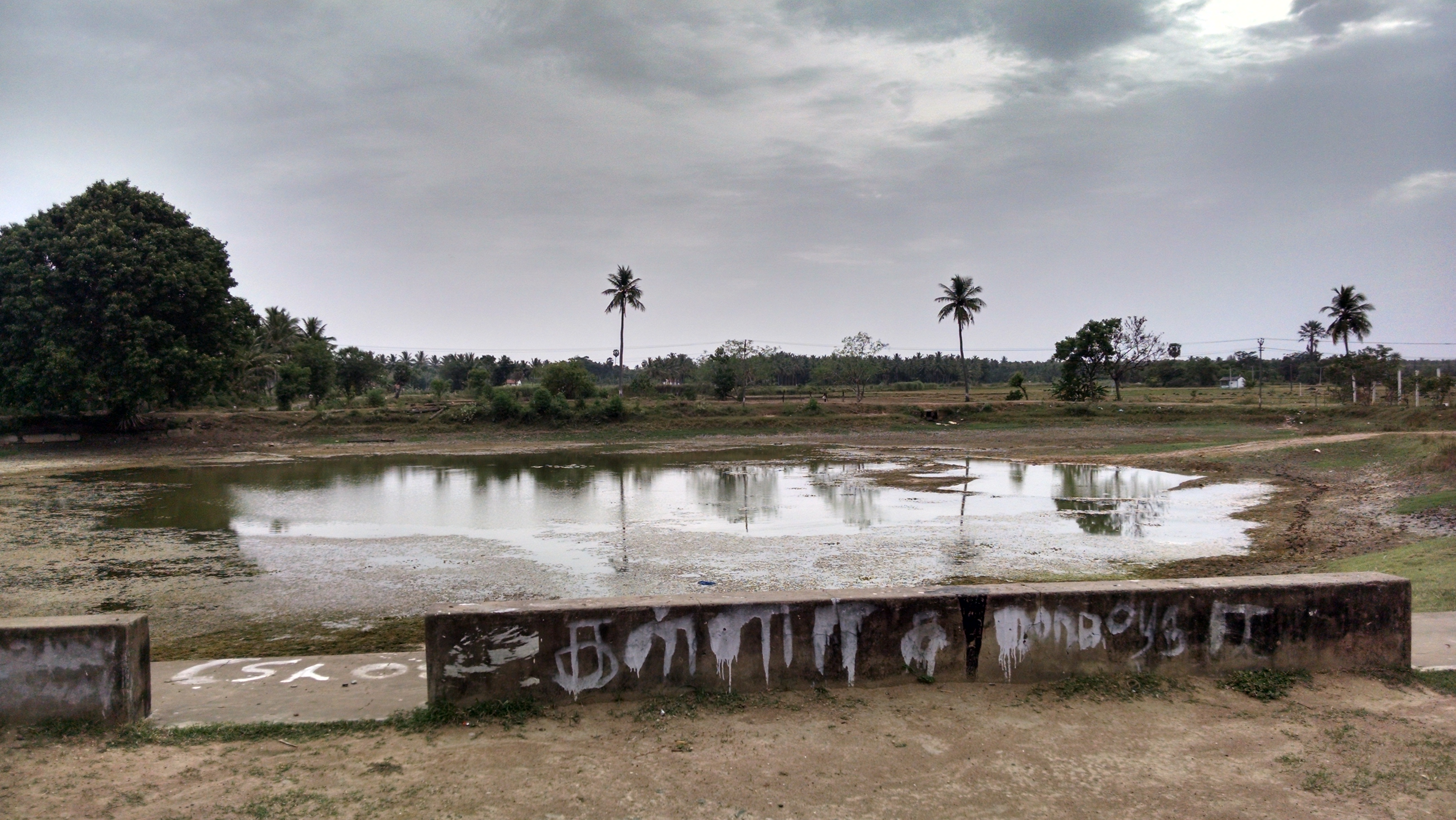
- Peikkarumbankottai
- Interactive map of Peikkarumbankottai
- Coordinates: 10°34′42.29″N 79°16′32.14″E
- Country: India
- State: Tamil Nadu
- District: Thanjavur
- Taluk: Orathanadu

Government
  - Body: Village Panchayat

Population (2011)
  - Total: 2,000

Languages
  - Official: தமிழ்
- Time zone: UTC+5:30 (IST)
- PIN: 614626
- Phone/WhatsApp Number: +965 94022081 / +974 72196121
- Vehicle registration: TN49

Peikkarumbankottai is a village in the Orathanadu taluk of Thanjavur district, Tamil Nadu, India.

== Demographics ==
=== 2011 census ===
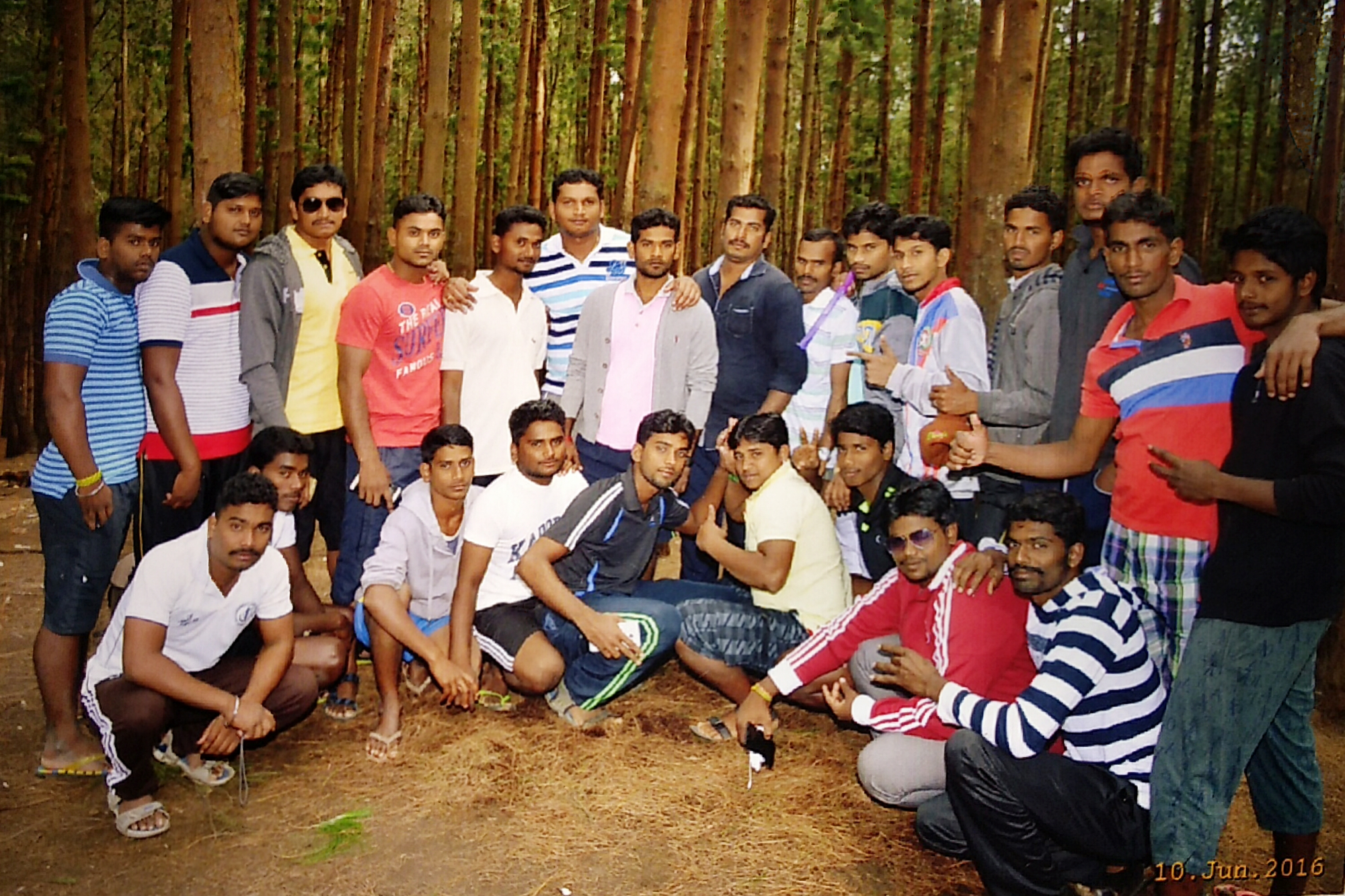
Peikkarumbankottai Thamizhannai Boys

Peikkarumbankottai is a small village located in Orathanadu of Thanjavur district, Tamil Nadu with total 600 families residing. The Peikkarumbankottai village has population of 1,600 of which 768 are males while 832 are females as per Population Census 2011.

In Peikkarumbankottai village population of children with age 0-6 is 154 which makes up 9.63% of total population of village. Average Sex Ratio of Peikkarumbankottai village is 1,083 which is higher than Tamil Nadu state average of 996. Child Sex Ratio for the Peikkarumbankottai as per census is 1,000, higher than Tamil Nadu average of 943.

Peikkarumbankottai village has lower literacy rate compared to Tamil Nadu. In 2011, literacy rate of Peikkarumbankottai village was 77.32% compared to 80.09% of Tamil Nadu. In Peikkarumbankottai Male literacy stands at 87.84% while female literacy rate was 67.68%.

=== 2001 census ===
As per constitution of India and Panchyati Raaj Act, Peikkarumbankottai village is administrated by Sarpanch (Head of Village) who is elected representative of village.

As per the 2001 census, Peikkarumbankottai had a total population of 1491 with 692 males and 799 females. The sex ratio was 1155. The literacy rate was 61.96. Just 30 km from Thanjavur, Pattukkottai 15 km, and Orathanadu 7 km.

Peikkarumbankottai is well connected by roads and railways with other parts of India and with cities and towns in Tamil Nadu. The nearest airport is Tiruchirapalli International Airport, located at a distance of 80 kilometres. The nearest seaport is Nagapattinam, which is 84 kilometres (52 mi) from Thanjavur.

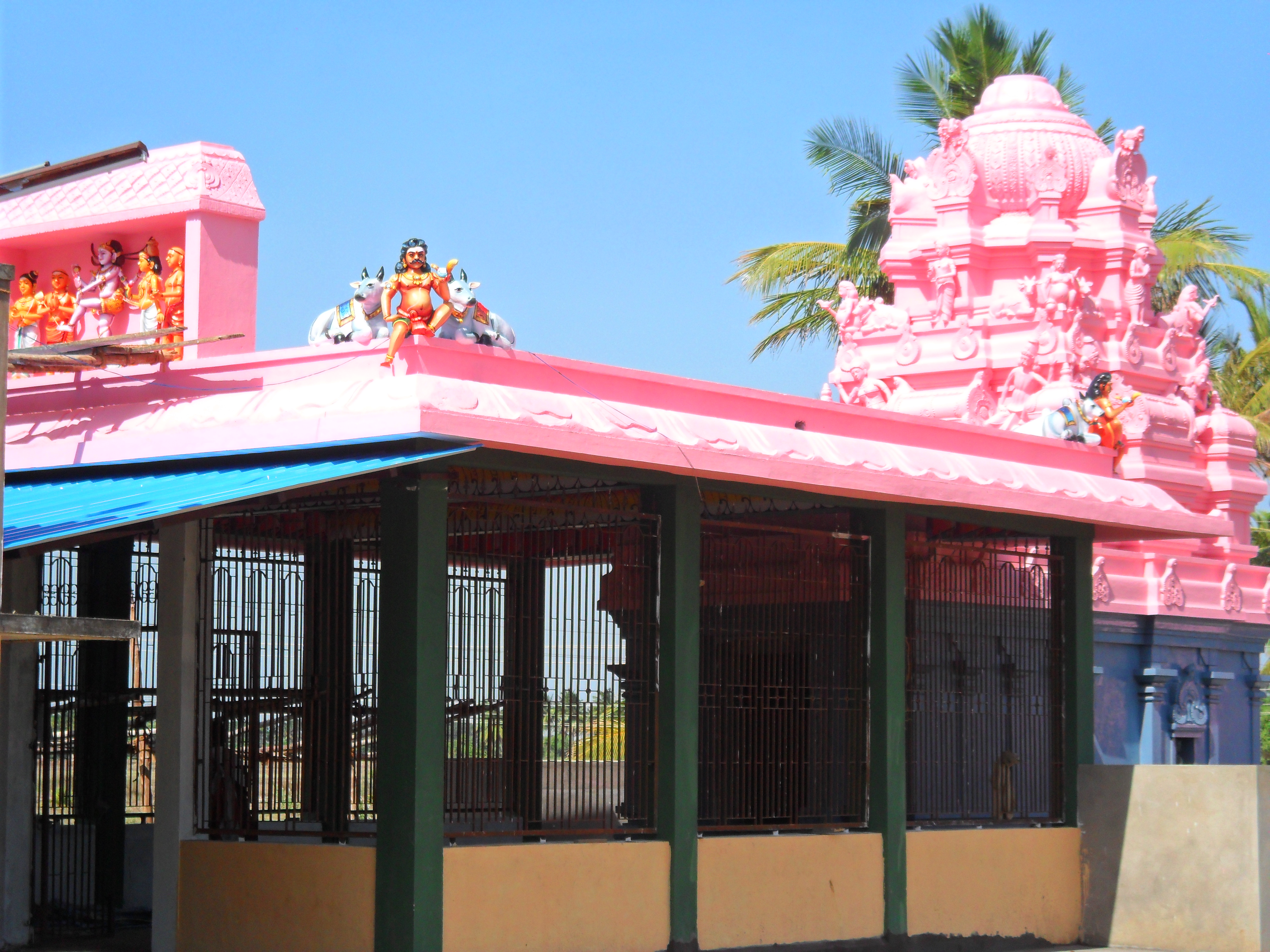
ThirugnanaSamantha Moorthy Kovil

== Nearby towns ==
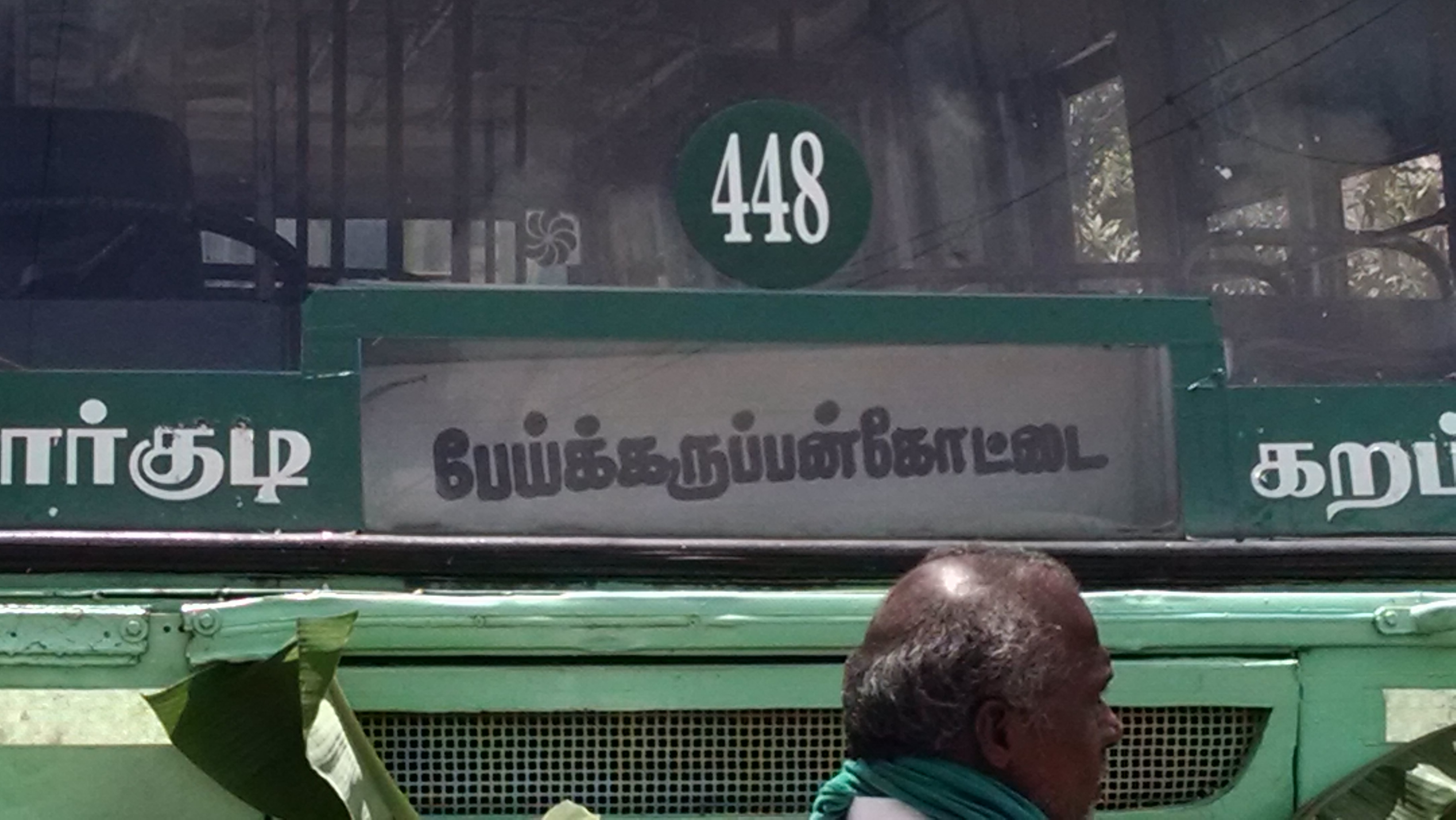
Peikkarumbankottai TO Thanjavur

- Orathanadu(Kallar Nadu) - 7 km southeast
- Pattukkottai - 18 km southeast
- Thanjavur - 28 km west
- Tiruchirappalli - 80 km west
- Kumbakonam - 70 km North east
- Thiruvaiyaru - 43 km northwest
- Tiruvarur - 40 km east
- Nagappattinam - 84 km east
- Mannargudi- 25 km east
- Perambalur - 70 km northwest
- Vailankanni - 96 km east
- Vedaranyam - 100 km southeast
- Pudukkottai - 55 km south
- Muthupetti - 25 km east

== Economy ==
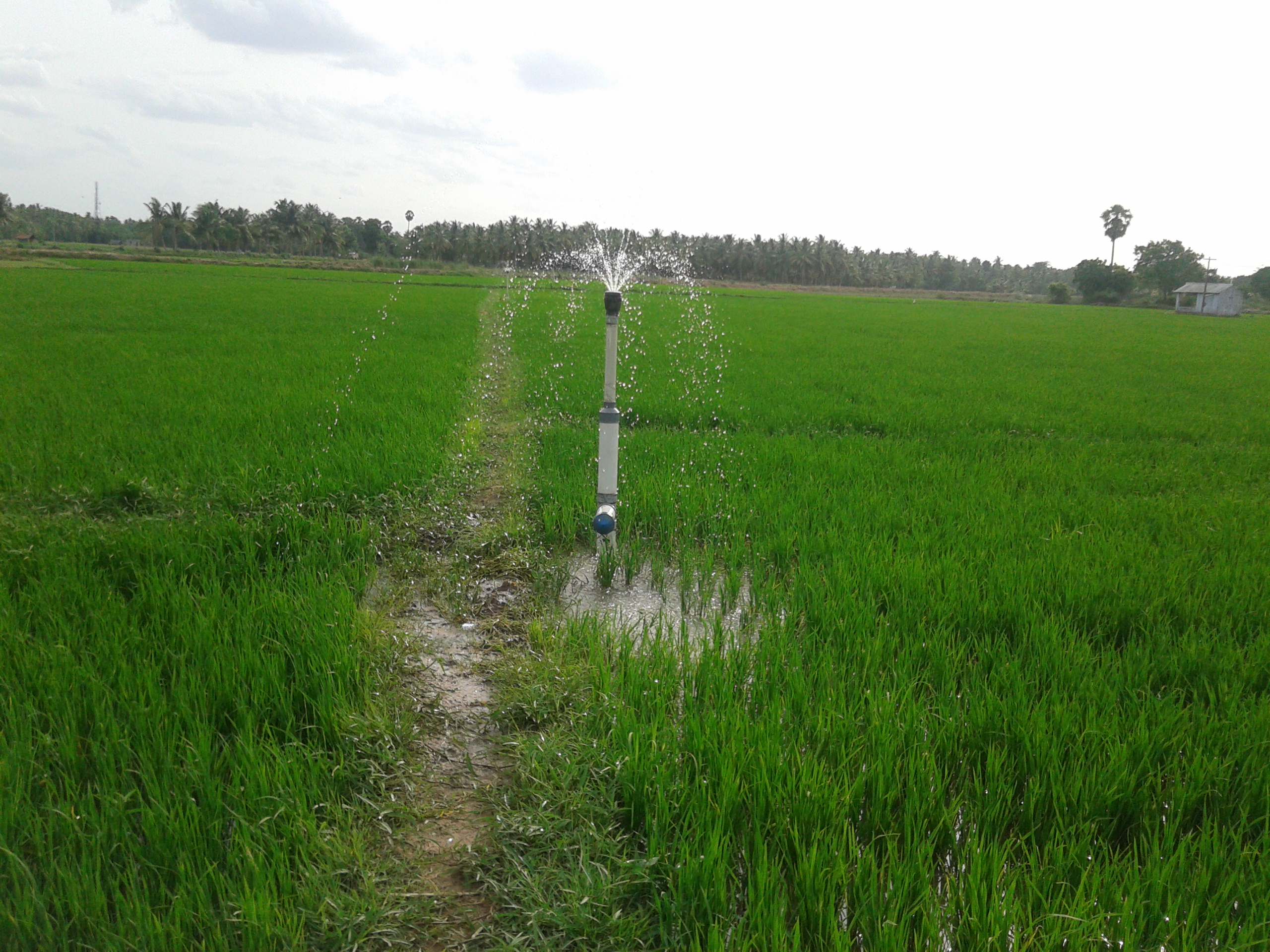
Peikkarumbankottai

The major occupation of the inhabitants of the town is tourism and service-oriented industry, while the traditional occupation is agriculture.
