= Kakkarakottai =

- village
- Country: India
- State: Tamil Nadu
- District: Thanjavur

Population (2001)
  - Total: 1,902

Languages
  - Official: Tamil
- Time zone: UTC+5:30 (IST)

Kakkarakottai is a village in the Orathanadu taluk of Thanjavur district, Tamil Nadu, India. Its area is about 10 km^{2}, and population is about 5000. This panchayath contains three villages: Kakkaraikkottai west, Kakkaraikkottai east and Vadakkunaththam, respectively. The village is bordered by Thekkur in the west, Pinnayur in the east, Vadakkikottai in north and Karukkadipatti in the south

There is one small river running through the village, with a small dam. most shops in the area are concentrated around a small bridge over the river. Almost all the lands of kakkarakottai are occupied by paddy cultivation, though rearing livestock also serves as primary occupations, with at least one area dedicated to commercial fish rearing. A lake is also present in eastern margin of west Kakkaraikkottai, serving as the namesake for the village (kakkarakottai derives from kal(stone), karai(shore) and kottai(fort)). There are two temples in west Kakkaraikkotttai namely Pillaiyar temple and Avudaiyar temple. If someone wants to go to the village, they would first have to go to Orathanadu from Thanjavur by bus and from there board a bus for Kakkarakkottai, or take a direct bus from thanjavur to kakkarakottai(Bus no. 33)

the village is largely hindu by religion, and has a notable population of birds such as peafowl and kites.
