= Senniaviduthy =

Senniyaviduthy
- village
- Country: India
- State: Tamil Nadu
- District: Thanjavur
- Taluk: Orathanadu

Population (2001)
  - Total: 2,849

Languages
  - Official: Tamil
- Time zone: UTC+5:30 (IST)

Senniyaviduthy is a village in the Orathanadu taluk of Thanjavur district, Tamil Nadu, India.

== Demographics ==
As per the 2001 census, Senniyaviduthy had a total population of 2,849 with 1,425 males and 1,424 females. The sex ratio was 999. The literacy rate was 57.22.
