= Nemilithippiakudi =

- village
- Country: India
- State: Tamil Nadu
- District: Thanjavur
- Taluk: Orathanadu

Population (2001)
  - Total: 2,719

Languages
  - Official: Tamil
- Time zone: UTC+5:30 (IST)

Nemilithippiakudi is a village in the Orathanadu taluk of Thanjavur district, Tamil Nadu, India.

== Demographics ==
As per the 2001 census, Nemilithippiakudi had a total population of 2719 with 1361 males and 1358 females. The sex ratio was 998. The literacy rate was 75.35.
