= Kattukurichi =

- village
- Country: India
- State: Tamil Nadu
- District: Thanjavur

Government
  - Panchayat President: Ramalingam S

Population (2011)
  - Total: 2,121

Languages
  - Official: Tamil
- Time zone: UTC+5:30 (IST)
- Postal code: 614904

Kattukurichi panchayat has three villages namely Kattukurichi, Nellupattu and Kasavalanadu kovilur in the orathanadu taluk of Thanjavur district, Tamil Nadu, India.
