= Pachiyur =

- village
- Country: India
- State: Tamil Nadu
- District: Thanjavur
- Taluk: Orathanadu

Population (2001)
  - Total: 1,340

Languages
  - Official: Tamil
- Time zone: UTC+5:30 (IST)

Pachiyur is a village in the Orathanadu taluk of Thanjavur district, Tamil Nadu, India.

== Demographics ==
As per the 2001 census, Pachiyur had a total population of 1340 with 664 males and 676 females. The sex ratio was 1018. The literacy rate was 64.59.
