= Orathanad Assembly constituency =

One of the 234 State Legislative Assembly Constituencies in Tamil Nadu, in India

Coordinates: 10°37′34″N 79°14′21″E

Orathanad
- Constituency No. 175 for the Tamil Nadu Legislative Assembly

Constituency details
- Country: India
- Region: South India
- State: Tamil Nadu
- District: Thanjavur
- Lok Sabha constituency: Thanjavur
- Established: 1967
- Total electors: 2,33,758
- Reservation: None

Member of Legislative Assembly
- 17th Tamil Nadu Legislative Assembly
- Incumbent R. Vaithilingam
- Party: DMK
- Alliance: SPA
- Elected year: 2026

Orathanad is a state assembly constituency in Thanjavur district in Tamil Nadu, India. It is one of the 234 State Legislative Assembly Constituencies in Tamil Nadu, in India. Elections and winners from this constituency are listed below.

== Members of Legislative Assembly ==
=== Tamil Nadu ===
Election	Member	Party
1971	L. Ganesan	Dravida Munnetra Kazhagam
1977	T. M. Thailappan	Dravida Munnetra Kazhagam
1980	T. Veeraswamy	Indian National Congress (I)
1984	T. Veeraswamy	All India Anna Dravida Munnetra Kazhagam
1989	L. Ganesan	Dravida Munnetra Kazhagam
1991	Thirunavukkarasu	All India Anna Dravida Munnetra Kazhagam
1996	P. Rajamanickam	Dravida Munnetra Kazhagam
2001	R. Vaithilingam	All India Anna Dravida Munnetra Kazhagam
2006	R. Vaithilingam	All India Anna Dravida Munnetra Kazhagam
2011	R. Vaithilingam	All India Anna Dravida Munnetra Kazhagam
2016	M. Ramachandran	Dravida Munnetra Kazhagam
2021	R. Vaithilingam	All India Anna Dravida Munnetra Kazhagam
2026	R. Vaithilingam	Dravida Munnetra Kazhagam

== Election results ==
Vote share of winning candidates
2026	44.42%
2021	46.95%
2016	46.87%
2011	57.80%
2006	47.88%
2001	53.34%
1996	57.24%
1991	58.75%
1989	43.16%
1984	46.28%
1980	50.53%
1977	35.50%
1971	61.99%
1967	60.82%

=== 2026 ===
2026 Tamil Nadu Legislative Assembly election: Orathanad
Party	Candidate	Votes	%	±%
DMK	R. Vaithilingam	86,759	44.42	▲12.50
TVK	Dr. K. Arvind	51,731	26.49	New
AIADMK	M. Sekar	44,260	22.66	▼24.29
NTK	S. Thirumurugan	10,135	5.19	▲0.47
NOTA	NOTA	631	0.32	▼0.13
Party For The Right of Other Backward Classes	M. Selvaraj	548	0.28	New
Independent	M. Kanagaraj	354	0.18	New
TDMK	C. Gunasekaran	352	0.18	New
Independent	T. Vijayakumar	277	0.14	New
Independent	A. Ajeshkannan	257	0.13	New
Margin of victory		35,028	17.93	▲2.90
Turnout		1,95,304	83.55	▲4.76
Registered electors		2,33,758		▼9,734
DMK gain from AIADMK		Swing	▲12.50	

=== 2021 ===
2021 Tamil Nadu Legislative Assembly election: Orathanad
Party	Candidate	Votes	%	±%
AIADMK	R. Vaithilingam	90,063	46.95	▲2.10
DMK	M. Ramachandran	61,228	31.92	▼14.95
AMMK	M. Sekar	26,022	13.56	New
NTK	M. Kandhasamy	9,050	4.72	▲3.67
Independent	V. Mookkaiyan	2,041	1.06	New
NOTA	Nota	867	0.45	▼0.59
Margin of victory		28,835	15.03	▲13.01
Turnout		191,840	78.79	▼1.09
Rejected ballots		300	0.16	
Registered electors		243,492		
AIADMK gain from DMK		Swing	0.08	

=== 2016 ===
2016 Tamil Nadu Legislative Assembly election: Orathanad
Party	Candidate	Votes	%	±%
DMK	M. Ramachandran	84,378	46.87%	▲9.64
AIADMK	R. Vaithilingam	80,733	44.85%	▼12.96
DMDK	Dr. P. Ramanathan	6,351	3.53%	New
NTK	M. Kandhasamy	1,891	1.05%	New
NOTA	None Of The Above	1,882	1.05%	New
PMK	M. Saravana Iyyappan	1,444	0.80%	New
BJP	T. Kesavan	1,003	0.56%	▼0.41
Margin of victory		3,645	2.02%	−18.55%
Turnout		180,023	79.88%	−2.23%
Registered electors		225,366		
DMK gain from AIADMK		Swing	-10.93%	

=== 2011 ===
2011 Tamil Nadu Legislative Assembly election: Orathanad
Party	Candidate	Votes	%	±%
AIADMK	R. Vaithilingam	91,724	57.80%	▲9.92
DMK	T. Mahesh Krishanasamy	59,080	37.23%	▼7.66
IJK	A. Arokiyasamy	1,843	1.16%	New
Independent	P. Murugaiyan	1,612	1.02%	New
BSP	A. Jayabal	1,542	0.97%	New
BJP	A. Karnan	1,532	0.97%	▼0.38
Independent	G. Parameswari	1,348	0.85%	New
Margin of victory		32,644	20.57%	17.58%
Turnout		193,265	82.11%	4.60%
Registered electors		158,681		
AIADMK hold		Swing	9.92%	

=== 2006 ===
2006 Tamil Nadu Legislative Assembly election: Orathanad
Party	Candidate	Votes	%	±%
AIADMK	R. Vaithilingam	61,595	47.88%	▼5.46
DMK	P. Rajamanickam	57,752	44.89%	▲8.14
DMDK	R. Ramesh	7,558	5.88%	New
BJP	T. Mahendran	1,733	1.35%	New
Margin of victory		3,843	2.99%	−13.59%
Turnout		128,638	77.50%	9.45%
Registered electors		165,978		
AIADMK hold		Swing	-5.46%	

=== 2001 ===
2001 Tamil Nadu Legislative Assembly election: Orathanad
Party	Candidate	Votes	%	±%
AIADMK	R. Vaithilingam	63,836	53.34%	▲21.57
DMK	P. Rajamanickam	43,992	36.76%	▼20.48
MDMK	Durai Balakrishnan	7,245	6.05%	▼4.94
Independent	S. Pandiyan Maniyar	4,603	3.85%	New
Margin of victory		19,844	16.58%	−8.88%
Turnout		119,676	68.05%	−7.52%
Registered electors		175,921		
AIADMK gain from DMK		Swing	-3.90%	

=== 1996 ===
1996 Tamil Nadu Legislative Assembly election: Orathanad
Party	Candidate	Votes	%	±%
DMK	P. Rajamanickam	68,213	57.24%	▲16.47
AIADMK	V. Suriyamoorthy	37,864	31.77%	▼26.98
MDMK	L. Ganesan	13,098	10.99%	New
Margin of victory		30,349	25.47%	7.48%
Turnout		119,175	75.58%	−0.46%
Registered electors		165,160		
DMK gain from AIADMK		Swing	-1.51%	

=== 1991 ===
1991 Tamil Nadu Legislative Assembly election: Orathanad
Party	Candidate	Votes	%	±%
AIADMK	Alagu. Thirunavukkarasu	68,208	58.75%	▲34.73
DMK	L. Ganesan	47,328	40.77%	▼2.4
Margin of victory		20,880	17.98%	−1.16%
Turnout		116,099	76.04%	−6.74%
Registered electors		156,922		
AIADMK gain from DMK		Swing	15.59%	

=== 1989 ===
1989 Tamil Nadu Legislative Assembly election: Orathanad
Party	Candidate	Votes	%	±%
DMK	L. Ganesan	49,554	43.16%	▲0.92
AIADMK	K. Srinivasan	27,576	24.02%	▼22.26
INC	N. Sivagnanam	21,269	18.52%	New
AIADMK	Alagu Thirunavukkarasu	13,529	11.78%	▼34.49
Independent	K. Kunju Pillai	2,537	2.21%	New
Margin of victory		21,978	19.14%	15.11%
Turnout		114,813	82.77%	0.16%
Registered electors		140,873		
DMK gain from AIADMK		Swing	-3.11%	

=== 1984 ===
1984 Tamil Nadu Legislative Assembly election: Orathanad
Party	Candidate	Votes	%	±%
AIADMK	T. Veeraswamy	46,717	46.28%	▼2.52
DMK	L. Ganesan	42,648	42.24%	New
INC(J)	Alagu. Thirunavukkabasu	11,590	11.48%	New
Margin of victory		4,069	4.03%	2.29%
Turnout		100,955	82.61%	5.35%
Registered electors		127,906		
AIADMK gain from INC		Swing	-4.26%	

=== 1980 ===
1980 Tamil Nadu Legislative Assembly election: Orathanad
Party	Candidate	Votes	%	±%
INC	T. Veeraswamy	47,021	50.53%	▲21.4
AIADMK	T.M. Thailappan	45,402	48.79%	▲20.61
Independent	T. Kuppusamy	624	0.67%	New
Margin of victory		1,619	1.74%	−4.62%
Turnout		93,047	77.26%	−0.95%
Registered electors		121,363		
INC gain from DMK		Swing	15.04%	

=== 1977 ===
1977 Tamil Nadu Legislative Assembly election: Orathanad
Party	Candidate	Votes	%	±%
DMK	T. M. Thailappan	31,866	35.50%	▼26.49
INC	N. Sivagananam	26,156	29.14%	▼3.93
AIADMK	T. Veeraswamy	25,299	28.18%	New
JP	A. Murugesan	5,079	5.66%	New
Independent	M. Thiruvengadam	1,368	1.52%	New
Margin of victory		5,710	6.36%	−22.56%
Turnout		89,768	78.21%	−4.95%
Registered electors		116,133		
DMK hold		Swing	-26.49%	

=== 1971 ===
1971 Tamil Nadu Legislative Assembly election: Orathanad
Party	Candidate	Votes	%	±%
DMK	L. Ganesan	49,269	61.99%	▲1.17
INC	Dhandayuthapani Pillai	26,283	33.07%	▼6.11
Independent	M. Karuppan	3,927	4.94%	New
Margin of victory		22,986	28.92%	7.28%
Turnout		79,479	83.16%	−3.50%
Registered electors		98,822		
DMK hold		Swing	1.17%	

=== 1967 ===
1967 Madras Legislative Assembly election: Orathanad
Party	Candidate	Votes	%	±%
DMK	L. Ganesan	45,232	60.82%	New
INC	Dhandayuthapani Pillai	29,139	39.18%	New
Margin of victory		16,093	21.64%	
Turnout		74,371	86.66%	
Registered electors		87,905		
DMK win (new seat)				
