= Yoganayagipuram =

- village
- Interactive map of Yoganayagipuram
- Coordinates: 10.508033°N 79.249344°E
- Country: India
- State: Tamil Nadu
- District: Thanjavur
- Taluk: Orathanadu

Population (2001)
  - Total: 131

Languages
  - Official: Tamil
- Time zone: UTC+5:30 (IST)

Yoganayagipuram is a village in the Orathanadu taluk of Thanjavur district, Tamil Nadu, India.

== Demographics ==
As per the 2001 census, Yoganayagipuram had a total population of 131 with 58 males and 73 females. The sex ratio was 1259. The literacy rate was 70.49.
