= Cholagankudikadu =

- village
- Location in Tamil Nadu, India Cholagankudikadu (India)
- Coordinates: 10°31′33″N 79°15′25″E
- Country: India
- State: Tamil Nadu
- District: Thanjavur

Population (2001)
  - Total: 1,947

Languages
  - Official: Tamil
- Time zone: UTC+5:30 (IST)

Cholagankudikadu is a village in the Orathanadu taluk of Thanjavur district, Tamil Nadu, India.

== Demographics ==
As per the 2001 census, Cholagankudikadu had a total population of 1947 with 956 males and 991 females. The sex ratio was 1037. The literacy rate was 73.46.
