= Samipatti =

- Village
- Interactive map of Samipatti
- Coordinates: 10°37′59″N 79°08′15″E
- Country: India
- State: Tamil Nadu
- District: Thanjavur
- Taluk: Orathanadu

Population (2001)
  - Total: 704

Languages
  - Official: Tamil
- Time zone: UTC+5:30 (IST)

Samipatti is a village in the Orathanadu taluk of Thanjavur district, Tamil Nadu, India.

It was located at 20 km south of Thanjavur town.

As per the 2001 census, Samipatti had a total population of 704 with 365 males and 339 females. The sex ratio was 92.9 females to every 100 males. The literacy rate was 71.9%. Major occupation was Farming in this village.

== Temple ==
This small village with three temples as follows:

- Naga Seli Amman kovil
- Pillayar kovil
- Kali Amman Kovil

== Village Festivals ==
=== Tamil Puthandu ===
Tamil puthandu thiruvila (Tamil New year) was celebrated with the function of tow days. First day by worshiping the gods by taking paal Kudam(A pot filled with milk, water,..etc.) and kavadi. Second day is celebrated with Electric Kavadi.

=== Pongal ===
Pongal was celebrated with the ending of Manjuviratu.

== Water source ==
Samipatti was surrounded by three water source a pond at its north region, a lake at its south and a river(Kattaru) a seasonal river to evacuate excess rain water at its south-west.
