= Kannugudi East =

- village
- Country: India
- State: Tamil Nadu
- District: Thanjavur

Population (2001)
  - Total: 1,785

Languages
  - Official: Tamil
- Time zone: UTC+5:30 (IST)

Kannugudi East is a village in the Orathanadu taluk of Thanjavur district, Tamil Nadu, India.

== Demographics ==
As per census, Kannugudi East had a total population of 1,785 with 873 males and 912 females. The sex ratio was 1.045. The literacy rate was 70.82%. Kannugudi is one of the most beautiful villages in thanjavur district. Large parts of the people involved in agriculture, one famous temple is there in kannugudi north street which is kali amman temple.
