= Surimurthypuram (Akkaravattam) =

Suriyamurthypuram (Akkaravattam)
- village
- Country: India
- State: Tamil Nadu
- District: Thanjavur
- Taluk: Orathanadu

Population (2001)
  - Total: 414

Languages
  - Official: Tamil
- Time zone: UTC+5:30 (IST)

Surimurthypuram (Akkaravattam) is a village in the Orathanadu taluk of Thanjavur district, Tamil Nadu, India.

== Demographics ==
As per the 2001 census, Surimurthypuram (Akkaravattam) had a total population of 414 with 202 males and 212 females. The sex ratio was 1050. The literacy rate was 61.97.
