= Chinna Ammangudi =

- village
- Country: India
- State: Tamil Nadu
- District: Thanjavur

Population (2001)
  - Total: 743

Languages
  - Official: Tamil
- Time zone: UTC+5:30 (IST)

Chinna Ammangudi is a village in the Orathanadu taluk of Thanjavur district, Tamil Nadu, India.

== Demographics ==
As per the 2001 census, Chinna Ammangudi had a total population of 743 with 344 males and 399 females. The literacy rate was 53.44%.
