= Poovathur (Pudhunagar) =

- village
- Country: India
- State: Tamil Nadu
- District: Thanjavur
- Taluk: Orathanadu

Population (2001)
  - Total: 1,028

Languages
  - Official: Tamil
- Time zone: UTC+5:30 (IST)

Poovathur (Pudhunagar) is a village in the Orathanadu taluk of Thanjavur district, Tamil Nadu, India.

== Demographics ==
As per the 2001 census, Poovathur (Pudhunagar) had a total population of 1028 with 482 males and 586 females. The sex ratio was 1133. The literacy rate was 68.53.
