= Paravathur =

- village
- Country: India
- State: Tamil Nadu
- District: Thanjavur
- Taluk: Orathanadu

Population (2011)
  - Total: 815

Languages
  - Official: Tamil
- Time zone: UTC+5:30 (IST)

Paravathur is a village in the Orathanadu taluk of Thanjavur district, Tamil Nadu, India.

== Demographics ==
According to the 2011 census, Paravathur had a total population of 815 (387 males and 428 females). The literacy rate was 75.48 according to the same census.
