= Raghavambalpuram (Sadayarkoil) =

- village
- Interactive map of Raghavambalpuram (Sadayarkoil)
- Coordinates: 10°44′00″N 79°15′46″E
- Country: India
- State: Tamil Nadu
- District: Thanjavur
- Taluk: Orathanadu

Population (2001)
  - Total: 1,627

Languages
  - Official: Tamil
- Time zone: UTC+5:30 (IST)

Raghavambalpuram (Sadayarkoil) is a village in the Orathanadu taluk of Thanjavur district, Tamil Nadu, India. It is located approximately 15 km away from Thanjavur city, and is connected to the city via the Thanjavur-Mannarkudi highway. The Palangulathu Ayyanar and Veninathaswamy temples are located in this area.

== Demographics ==
As per the 2001 census, Raghavambalpuram (Sadayarkoil) had a total population of 1627 with 843 males and 824 females. The sex ratio was 930. The literacy rate was 63.86.
