= Panikondanviduthy =

- village
- Country: India
- State: Tamil Nadu
- District: Thanjavur
- Taluk: Orathanadu

Population (2001)
  - Total: 1,954

Languages
  - Official: Tamil
- Time zone: UTC+5:30 (IST)
- Postal code: 614 614

Panikondanviduthy is a village in the Orathanadu taluk of Thanjavur district, Tamil Nadu, India.

== Demographics ==
As per the 2001 census, Panikondanviduthy had a total population of 1954 with 972 males and 982 females. The sex ratio was 1010. The literacy rate was 64.5.
