= K. Thangamuthu =

Tamil Nadu Assembly former Member

Member of Legislative Assembly, Tamilnadu Legislative Assembly
- In office 1991–1996
- Preceded by: M. Ramachandran
- Succeeded by: M. Ramachandran
- Constituency: Thiruvonam

Personal details
- Born: 4 June 1947 Thirunallur
- Party: AIADMK
- Profession: Farmer

K. Thangamuthu is an Indian politician and a former Member of the Tamil Nadu Legislative Assembly. He hails from Thirunallur village in Thanjavur district. Thangamuthu is a member of the All India Anna Dravida Munnetra Kazhagam (AIADMK). He was elected as a Member of the Legislative Assembly after contesting from the Thiruvonam constituency in the 1991 Tamil Nadu Assembly elections.

== Election performance ==
=== 1991 ===
1991 Tamil Nadu Legislative Assembly election: Thiruvonam
Party	Candidate	Votes	%	±%
AIADMK	K. Thangamuthu	75,141	64.73%	38.72%
DMK	M. Ramachandran	40,173	34.61%	−2.56%
THMM	K. Gunaseelan	306	0.26%	
Independent	K. Mathiyazhagan	264	0.23%	
LKD	R. Vaiyapurikadavarayar	206	0.18%	
Margin of victory		34,968	30.12%	18.97%
Turnout		116,090	74.33%	−7.05%
Registered electors		161,027		
AIADMK gain from DMK		Swing	27.56%	
