= Thenammanadu North =

Thenammanadu North Thennamanadu North
- village
- Country: India
- State: Tamil Nadu
- District: Thanjavur
- Taluk: Orathanadu

Population (2001)
  - Total: 1,354

Languages
  - Official: Tamil
- Time zone: UTC+5:30 (IST)

Thennamanadu North is a village in the Orathanadu taluk of Thanjavur district, Tamil Nadu, India.

== Demographics ==
As per the 2001 census, Thennamanadu North had a total population of 1354 with 625 males and 729 females. The sex ratio was 1166. The literacy rate was 65.1.
