= Sankaranar Kudi Kadu =

- village
- Nickname: sangai
- Country: India
- State: Tamil Nadu
- District: Thanjavur
- Taluk: Orathanadu

Population (2001)
  - Total: 1,442

Languages
  - Official: Tamil
- Time zone: UTC+5:30 (IST)

Sankaranar Kudi Kadu is a village in the Orathanadu taluk of Thanjavur district, Tamil Nadu, India.

== Demographics ==
As per the 2001 census, Sankaranar Kudi Kadu had a total population of 1442 with 706 males and 736 females. The sex ratio was 1042. The literacy rate was 66.72.
