= Thiruvonam Assembly constituency =

State assembly constituency in Tamil Nadu, India

Coordinates: 10.51°N 79.16°E

Thiruvonam
- Former constituency for the Tamil Nadu Legislative Assembly

Constituency details
- Country: India
- Region: South India
- State: Tamil Nadu
- District: Thanjavur
- Lok Sabha constituency: Thanjavur
- Established: 1977
- Abolished: 2008
- Total electors: 200,113

Thiruvonam was a state assembly constituency in Thanjavur district in Tamil Nadu. Elections and winners from this constituency are listed below.

== Members of the Legislative Assembly ==
Year	Winner	Party
1977	Durai Govindarajan	All India Anna Dravida Munnetra Kazhagam
1980	N. Sivagnanam	Indian National Congress (I)
1984	V. Sivagnanam	Indian National Congress
1989	M. Ramachandran	Dravida Munnetra Kazhagam
1991	K. Thangamuthu	All India Anna Dravida Munnetra Kazhagam
1996	M. Ramachandran	Dravida Munnetra Kazhagam
2001	C. Rajendran	All India Anna Dravida Munnetra Kazhagam
2006	T. Mahesh Krishnasamy	Dravida Munnetra Kazhagam

== Election results ==
=== 1977 ===
1977 Tamil Nadu Legislative Assembly election: Thiruvonam
Party	Candidate	Votes	%	±%
AIADMK	Durai Govindarajan	23,779	29.06%	
DMK	Pulavar T. Tholappan	21,566	26.36%	
INC	N. Vaiyapuri Vanniyar	17,004	20.78%	
Independent	P. Thangaraj	9,987	12.21%	
JP	N. Kaliamoorthy	9,490	11.60%	
Margin of victory		2,213	2.70%	
Turnout		81,826	76.24%	
Registered electors		108,939		
AIADMK win (new seat)				

=== 1980 ===
1980 Tamil Nadu Legislative Assembly election: Thiruvonam
Party	Candidate	Votes	%	±%
INC	N. Sivagnanam	44,748	49.36%	28.58%
AIADMK	Durai Govindarajan	44,686	49.29%	20.23%
Independent	D. Sambandam	1,229	1.36%	
Margin of victory		62	0.07%	−2.64%
Turnout		90,663	77.10%	0.86%
Registered electors		118,707		
INC gain from AIADMK		Swing	20.30%	

=== 1984 ===
1984 Tamil Nadu Legislative Assembly election: Thiruvonam
Party	Candidate	Votes	%	±%
INC	V. Sivagnanam	46,777	48.25%	−1.11%
DMK	M. Ramachandran	35,707	36.83%	
INC(J)	K. Thangamuthu	12,601	13.00%	
Independent	S. Prakasom	1,065	1.10%	
Independent	V. Thenmani	415	0.43%	
Independent	M. K. Arumugam	388	0.40%	
Margin of victory		11,070	11.42%	11.35%
Turnout		96,953	82.02%	4.93%
Registered electors		124,226		
INC hold		Swing	-1.11%	

=== 1989 ===
1989 Tamil Nadu Legislative Assembly election: Thiruvonam
Party	Candidate	Votes	%	±%
DMK	M. Ramachandran	42,479	37.17%	0.34%
AIADMK	K. Thangamuthu	29,730	26.01%	
INC	Nanchi K. Varadarajan	23,124	20.23%	−28.02%
AIADMK	Durai Govindarajan	17,522	15.33%	
Independent	C. Kasinathan	1,333	1.17%	
Independent	R. Vaiyapuri	110	0.10%	
Margin of victory		12,749	11.15%	−0.26%
Turnout		114,298	81.38%	−0.64%
Registered electors		142,748		
DMK gain from INC		Swing	-11.08%	

=== 1991 ===
1991 Tamil Nadu Legislative Assembly election: Thiruvonam
Party	Candidate	Votes	%	±%
AIADMK	K. Thangamuthu	75,141	64.73%	38.72%
DMK	M. Ramachandran	40,173	34.61%	−2.56%
THMM	K. Gunaseelan	306	0.26%	
Independent	K. Mathiyazhagan	264	0.23%	
LKD	R. Vaiyapurikadavarayar	206	0.18%	
Margin of victory		34,968	30.12%	18.97%
Turnout		116,090	74.33%	−7.05%
Registered electors		161,027		
AIADMK gain from DMK		Swing	27.56%	

=== 1996 ===
1996 Tamil Nadu Legislative Assembly election: Thiruvonam
Party	Candidate	Votes	%	±%
DMK	M. Ramachandran	72,403	57.36%	22.76%
AIADMK	K. Thangamuthu	40,853	32.37%	−32.36%
MDMK	Balakrishnan Durai	9,524	7.55%	
PMK	K. Kunjupillai Mutharaiyar	771	0.61%	
Independent	R. Nedunchezhian	652	0.52%	
Independent	M. Kaliaperumal	446	0.35%	
Independent	T. Samiaiya	380	0.30%	
Independent	V. Kaliaperumal Yadava	237	0.19%	
Independent	C. Balaiyan	230	0.18%	
Independent	N. Palaiyan	192	0.15%	
Independent	V. Raju Udayar	148	0.12%	
Margin of victory		31,550	25.00%	−5.12%
Turnout		126,215	74.97%	0.64%
Registered electors		176,055		
DMK gain from AIADMK		Swing	-7.36%	

=== 2001 ===
2001 Tamil Nadu Legislative Assembly election: Thiruvonam
Party	Candidate	Votes	%	±%
AIADMK	C. Rajendran	67,094	52.21%	19.84%
DMK	M. Ramachandran	55,871	43.48%	−13.89%
MDMK	Ramachandran Singh	5,544	4.31%	−3.23%
Margin of victory		11,223	8.73%	−16.26%
Turnout		128,509	65.60%	−9.38%
Registered electors		195,917		
AIADMK gain from DMK		Swing	-5.16%	

=== 2006 ===
2006 Tamil Nadu Legislative Assembly election: Thiruvonam
Party	Candidate	Votes	%	±%
DMK	T. Mahesh Krishnasamy	69,235	46.16%	2.68%
AIADMK	K. Thangamuthu	67,430	44.96%	−7.25%
DMDK	M. Sivakumar	8,488	5.66%	
Independent	S. Govindaraj	1,965	1.31%	
BJP	V. Mookkaiyan	1,150	0.77%	
Independent	Arjunan Malai	938	0.63%	
SP	T. Sathiya Moorthy	411	0.27%	
BSP	N. Ravi	374	0.25%	
Margin of victory		1,805	1.20%	−7.53%
Turnout		149,991	74.95%	9.35%
Registered electors		200,113		
DMK gain from AIADMK		Swing	-6.05%	
