= Sillathur =

- village
- Country: India
- State: Tamil Nadu
- District: Thanjavur
- Taluk: Orathanadu

Population (2001)
  - Total: 3,730

Languages
  - Official: Tamil
- Time zone: UTC+5:30 (IST)

Sillathur is a village in the Orathanadu taluk of Thanjavur district, Tamil Nadu, India.

== Demographics ==
As per the 2001 census, Sillathur had a total population of 3730 with 1878 males and 1852 females. The sex ratio was 986. The literacy rate was 55.86.
