= Karukkakottai =

- village
- Location in Tamil Nadu, India
- Coordinates: 10.664558°N 79.183775°E
- Country: India
- State: Tamil Nadu
- District: Thanjavur

Languages
  - Official: Tamil
- Time zone: UTC+5:30 (IST)
- Postal code: 614903

Karukkakottai is a village in the Orathanadu taluk of Thanjavur district, Tamil Nadu, India.

== Demographics ==
As per the 2001 census, Karukkakottai had a total population of 1080 with 534 males and 546 females. The sex ratio was 1022. The literacy rate was 58.21.
