= Tirumangalakottai West =

- village
- Country: India
- State: Tamil Nadu
- District: Thanjavur
- Taluk: Orathanadu

Population (2001)
  - Total: 2,228

Languages
  - Official: Tamil
- Time zone: UTC+5:30 (IST)

Tirumangalakottai West is a village in the Orathanadu taluk of Thanjavur district, Tamil Nadu, India.

== Demographics ==
In 2001, Tirumangalakottai West had a total population of 2228 with 1081 males and 1147 females. The sex ratio was 1061. The literacy rate was 68.31.

== Temples ==
Perumal Kovil
Ayyanar Kovil
Murugan Kovil
Pillaiyar Kovil

== See also ==
Tirumangalakottai East
