= Moorthiambalpuram (Panayakkottai) =

Moorthiambalpuram Panayakkottai
- village
- Nickname: kallar kottai
- Country: India
- State: Tamil Nadu
- District: Thanjavur
- Taluk: Orathanadu

Government
  - Panchayat President: kallar

Area
  - Total: 6 km^{2} (2.3 sq mi)
  - Rank: 1

Population (2001)
  - Total: 2,292
  - Density: 380/km^{2} (990/sq mi)

Languages
  - Official: Tamil
- Time zone: UTC+5:30 (IST)
- Postal code: 614019
- Website: www.pnk.com

Moorthiambalpuram - Panayakkottai is a village in the Orathanadu taluk of Thanjavur district, Tamil Nadu, India.

== Demographics ==
As per the 2001 census, Moorthiambalpuram had a total population of 2292 with 1168 males and 1124 females. The sex ratio was 962. The literacy rate was 67.81.
