= Kavalipatti =

- village
- Country: India
- State: Tamil Nadu
- District: Thanjavur

Population (2001)
  - Total: 4,120

Languages
  - Official: Tamil
- Time zone: UTC+5:30 (IST)

Kavalipatti is a village in the Orathanadu taluk of Thanjavur district, Tamil Nadu, India.

== Demographics ==
At the 2001 census, Kavalipatti had a total population of 4120 with 2018 males and 2102 females. The sex ratio was 1042. The literacy rate was 63.01.The Kaliamman Temple is very famous here An kavalipatti famous for god of Arulmigu: Agorakaliyamman. Agarakaliyamman is most powerful god.
