= Thelungan Kudikadu =

Coordinates: 10.3500°N 79.3833°E

Thelungan Kudikkadu
- village
- Nickname: Area of chozha
- Interactive map of Thelungan Kudikkadu
- Country: India
- State: Tamil Nadu
- District: Thanjavur
- Taluk: Orathanadu
  - Rank: 0

Population (2016)
  - Total: 6,500
  - Rank: 4

Languages
  - Official: Tamil
- Time zone: UTC+5:30 (IST)
- Postal code: 614 625

Thelungan Kudikadu is a village in the Orathanadu taluk of Thanjavur district, Tamil Nadu, India.

Demographics

Thelungan Kudikadu Village, with population of 6500 is Orathanadu sub district's the 41st most populous village, located in Orathanadu sub district of Thanjavur district in the state Tamil Nadu in India. Total geographical area of Thelungan kudikadu village is 6 km2 and it is the 28th biggest village by area in the sub district. Population density of the village is 361 persons per km2.

Nearest town of the village is Orathanadu. The village has its own post office and the pin code of Thelungan kudikadu village is 614625. The village comes under Thelungan Kudikadu. Orathanadu is the sub district headquarter and the distance from the village is 5 km. District headquarter of the village is Thanjavur which is 27 km away.

Road

There are two major main roads in the village: Thanjavur and pattukkottai.

Economy

Thelungan Kudikkadu village is known as the "Rice bowl of thanjavur, Tamil Nadu". Paddy is the crops and the other crops grown are blackgram, banana, coconut, gingelly, ragi, red gram, green gram, sugarcane and maize. The total percentage of land fit for cultivation is 80%. There are three seasons for agriculture in thelungan kudikadu – Kuruvai (June to September), Samba (August to January) and Thaladi (September, October to February, March).[49]

Education

Thelungan Kudikkadu has a total of four school North Street: Government Pre-School and Government Primary School Valathan theru : Government Pre- School and Government Primary School

Government Hospital-24-hours

24 hours-Government Primary Health Centre operating 24 hours

DPC - (Direct Purchase Centre) Under TNCSC

Selva Vinayagar Kovil

Thanneer Panthal Pillayar Kovil is located at center of this Village. The village center also includes many public amenities.
