= Cholapuram (Orathanadu) =

Cholapuram (Orathanadu) Cholapuram
- village
- Location in Tamil Nadu, India Cholapuram (Orathanadu) (India)
- Coordinates: 10°37′34″N 79°11′6″E
- Country: India
- State: Tamil Nadu
- District: Thanjavur

Population (2011)
  - Total: 2,285

Languages
  - Official: Tamil
- Time zone: UTC+5:30 (IST)

Cholapuram is a village in the Orathanadu taluk of Thanjavur district, Tamil Nadu, India.

== Demographics ==
As per the 2011 census, Cholapuram had a total population of 2285, and the literacy rate was 72.05%.

	Total	Male	Female
Houses	583	-	-
Population	2,285	1,118	1,167
Children (Aged 0-6)	242	129	113
Literacy	72.05%	82.51%	62.24%

=== Work Profile ===
72.39 % of the 1,311 working population describe their employment as working more than 6 months while the remaining 27.61 % describe their work as marginal activity providing livelihood for less than 6 months. Of the 72.39 % in hard labour, 168 were cultivators and 658 work in agriculture.
