= Medayakkottai =

Medayakkollai
- village
- Country: India
- State: Tamil Nadu
- District: Thanjavur
- Taluk: Orathanadu

Population (2001)
  - Total: 713

Languages
  - Official: Tamil
- Time zone: UTC+5:30 (IST)

Medayakkottai is a village in the Orathanadu taluk of Thanjavur district, Tamil Nadu, India.

== Demographics ==
As per the 2001 census, Medayakkottai had a total population of 713 with 344 males and 369 females. The sex ratio was 1073. The literacy rate was 61.34.
