= Adambai =

- Village
- Location in Tamil Nadu, India Adambai (India)
- Coordinates: 10°26′57.89″N 79°17′14.80″E
- Country: India
- State: Tamil Nadu
- District: Thanjavur

Government
  - Type: Panchayath

Languages
  - Official: Tamil, English
- Time zone: UTC+5:30 (IST)
- PIN: 614602

Adambai is a village situated 9 km from the sub-district headquarters of Pattukkottai, 60 km from the district headquarters of Thanjavur and 362 km away from the state capital Chennai. It is one of the biggest panchayats under Tiruvonam union and is also within Peravurani constituency.
