= M. Ramachandran =

Indian politician (1946–2026)

Member of the Legislative Assembly (MLA)
- Constituency: Orathanadu

Personal details
- Born: 15 April 1946
- Died: 2 November 2026 (aged 80) Thanjavur, Tamil Nadu, India
- Party: Dravida Munnetra Kazhagam

M. Ramachandran (15 April 1946 – 2 November 2026) was an Indian politician who belonged to Pinnaiyur West near Orathanadu who served as the Member of the Legislative Assembly (MLA) for Orathanadu constituency in the 15th Tamil Nadu Legislative Assembly. Ramachandran was elected from the Orathanadu constituency in the 2016 state assembly elections as a candidate of the Dravida Munnetra Kazhagam (DMK) party. In winning the seat, he defeated the incumbent MLA and Minister for Housing and Agriculture, R. Vaithilingam, in what was described as a giant-killing outcome. Vaithilingam had won the seat, which was largely dependent on agriculture, in the previous three elections, while Ramachandran was a late entry as a candidate in the election, being nominated by the DMK as a replacement for the party's original choice of S. S. Rajkumar in April of election year. Rajkumar, a brother of S. S. Palanimanickam, had decided that Thanjavur was the only constituency for which he was prepared to stand. Ramachandran was previously elected to the Tamil Nadu Legislative Assembly from the Thiruvonam constituency in the 1989 and 1996 elections. He lost the contest for the seat in 1991 and 2001. In 2006, the DMK were involved in an electoral pact which meant that he was not allowed to stand as a candidate. The party's decision to stand aside in favour of a candidate from the Pattali Makkal Katchi was met with protests from local supporters of Ramachandran.

Ramachandran died from a cardiac arrest on 2 November 2026, at the age of 80.
