= Tirumangalakottai East =

- village
- Location in Tamil Nadu, India Tirumangalakottai East (India)
- Coordinates: 10.61°N 79.25°E
- Country: India
- State: Tamil Nadu
- District: Thanjavur
- Taluk: Orathanadu

Population (2001)
  - Total: 2,742

Languages
  - Official: Tamil
- Time zone: UTC+5:30 (IST)

Tirumangalakottai East is a village in the Orathanadu taluk of Thanjavur district, Tamil Nadu, India.

== Demographics ==
As per the 2001 census, Tirumangalakottai East had a total population of 2742 with 1389 males and 1353 females. The sex ratio was 974. The literacy rate was 67.55.

== See also ==
Tirumangalakottai West
