= Thennamanadu =

Thennamanadu Thennavan Nadu, Thennavai
- Village
- Nickname: TND
- Location in Tamil Nadu, India Thennamanadu (India)
- Coordinates: 10°38′33″N 79°14′08″E
- Country: India
- State: Tamil Nadu
- District: Thanjavur
- Taluk: Orathanadu

Population (2001)
  - Total: 4,965

Languages
  - Official: Tamil and English
- Time zone: UTC+5:30 (IST)
- Pin code: 614625
- Schools/Colleges: 4/2
- Nearest city: Thanjavur
- Sex ratio: 1137 ♂/ 1000♀
- Literacy: 65.76%
- Lok Sabha constituency: Thanjavur
- Vidhan Sabha constituency: Orathanadu
- Avg. summer temperature: 36 °C (97 °F)
- Avg. winter temperature: 23 °C (73 °F)

Thennamanadu is a village panchayat in Orattanadu Block of Thanjavur district in Tamil Nadu, South India. It is located between the cities of Thanjavur and Pattukkottai, 20 km (12 mi) from Thanjavur, 2 km (1.2 mi) from Orathanadu and 339 km (211 mi) from the state capital Chennai.

Time Zone	IST (UTC + 05:30)
Currency	Indian Rupee (INR)
Dialing Code	+91
Date format	dd/mm/yyyy
Driving side	left
Internet cTLD	in

== History ==
During 883 ACE, a Pandiya King Pandi Undan built the Shiva temple. The temple was named Thennavan Nadu (Tamil: தென்னவன் நாடு), now Thennamanadu. The Kalyana Odai River runs through the village which was constructed by British rulers around 1935 AD.

== Geography and climate ==
Thennamanadu has an average elevation of 2 m (6.6 ft). The village lies on the bank of Kalyana odai river (the south branch of Kaveri River).

The Boundary sites of the village are;

East: Oorachi Long Mannargudi

West: Sethurayankudikkadu Long Vallam

North: Paruthikottai Long Thanjavur

South: Orathanadu Long Pattukkottai

Southwest: Mandalakottai Long Pudukkottai

Block Name: Orattanadu

District: Thanjavur

State: Tamil Nadu

Elevation / Altitude: 49 meters. Above Sea level

The maximum temperature is approximately 36 °C during April - May and the minimum temperature approximately 22.8 °C from December to January.

== Division and population ==
The Panchayath consists of 12 Karai (division) including Sethurayankudikkadu. The population of Thennamanadu is 4,965, including 2,337 males and 2,628 females. The sex ratio is 1,137 females per 1,000 males. The literacy rate is 65.76%.

== Occupation and culture ==
The main occupation of the people is agriculture. Paddy, pulses, groundnut, gingelly and sugarcane are the main field crops and coconut, cashew, mango and banana are the important tree crops. The river Kallyanaodai is the main water source.

== Education ==
Thennamanadu has software engineering professionals, doctors, civil engineers, lawyers, teachers, IAS etc. Also has sports players at state and national level players.

=== Colleges ===
- Thennamanadu Dharmambal Ramasamy Arts and Science College
- Thennamanadu Dharmambal Ramasamy Teachers Training College

=== Schools ===
- Thennamanadu Sri Rama Vilas Govt Aided High School
- Thennamanadu Government Middle School
- Thennamanadu Government Primary School (ADW)
- Thennamanadu Raja Rajan Primary School

=== Libraries ===
- Thennamanadu Government Public Library

== Festivals and Celebrations ==
Festivals in the Thennamanadu;

- Mariamman Temple Thiruvizha during the month of April and May
- Throbathai Ammam Theemithi Thiruvizha during the month of March
- Sithirai and Panguni Parkudam and Kavadi Thiruvizha
- Maasi Maham in Sannithi Amman Temple
- Pongal Vizhaiyattu Vizha
- Uzhavar Dina Maadu Vidum Vizha

Sri Thogai Malai Ayyanar Koil has situated nearby the Vallam Road bus stop. It is situated inside the Adhidhravidar street. Theethara Appchi Temple is a famous temple in Thennamanadu. Vembaiyannar Temple is the God in Sethurayar & Thuraiundar kula theivam. In the bank of the "Ammini Pond" is situated Vinayaka, a big Muni Veeran Statue, and some family gods temple.

Thirumeni Pattan Temple is God and kula theivam for Madurayar and situated at bank of the "Ammini Pond".
