= Ulur West =

- Village
- Interactive map of Ulur West
- Coordinates: 10.6824853°N 79.2255027°W
- Country: India
- State: Tamil Nadu
- District: Thanjavur
- Taluk: Orathanadu

Population (2011)
  - Total: 4,209

Languages
  - Official: Tamil
- Time zone: UTC+5:30 (IST)
- Postal code: 614904

Ulur West is a village in the Orathanadu taluk of Thanjavur district, Tamil Nadu, India.

== Population ==
As per the 2011 census, Ulur West had a total population of 4098 with 1976 males and 2122 females. The sex ratio was 832. The literacy rate was 71.9%. There was a working population of 1614 people or 39.4%
