= Ichankottai =

Eachankottai
- village
- Country: India
- State: Tamil Nadu
- District: Thanjavur

Population (2001)
  - Total: 2,184

Languages
  - Official: Tamil
- Time zone: UTC+5:30 (IST)

Eachankottai is a village in the Orathanadu taluk of Thanjavur district, Tamil Nadu, India.

== Demographics ==
As per the 2001 census, Eachankottai had a total population of 2184 with 1105 males and 1079 females. The sex ratio was 976. The literacy rate was 68.2.
