= Mullurpattikadu =

- village
- Country: India
- State: Tamil Nadu
- District: Thanjavur
- Taluk: Orathanadu

Population (2001)
  - Total: 1,339

Languages
  - Official: Tamil
- Time zone: UTC+5:30 (IST)

Mullurpattikadu is a village in the Orathanadu taluk of Thanjavur district, Tamil Nadu, India.

== Demographics ==
As per the 2001 census, Mullurpattikadu had a total population of 1339 with 599 males (about 75% of the males are staying foreign countries to run their family because of globalization and lack of water resources from the cauvery river) and 740 females. The sex ratio was 1235. The literacy rate was 67.06. Mullurpattikkadu village is an end orathanadu taluk boundary. Most of them are doing farming their own land (e.g. a paddy, ground nut farm, coconut farm, production of gingelly oil). The village has only one lake, located at South Mullur, and about 10-15 ponds are located. Very few of them were employed in Govt administration. Most of the people pray to the Hindu god Shiva, murugan (subramania swami), sivanthayee amman, pechiyamman, pillyar, agora veerabhadra veeranar, Malaimariyan. Mullurpattikkadu is divided into six areas: Mazhavarayar Thearu, Senapathyathy Theru, Puthu Theru, Palamthru, South Mullr, North Mullr, and Pattikkadu. Most of them play volleyball and cricket. This village also known as part of Musugunda Nadu.

Primary facilities -Phc, bank (within 5 km) - pattukkotai taluk police station (within 10 km) -2 government primary schools within the village
