= Kodiyalam =

- village
- Country: India
- State: Tamil Nadu
- District: Thanjavur
- Founder: Sethurayar's

Population (2001)
  - Total: 567

Languages
  - Official: Tamil
- Time zone: UTC+5:30 (IST)

Kodiyalam is a village in the Orathanadu taluk of Thanjavur district, Tamil Nadu, India.

== Demographics ==
As per the 2001 census, Kodiyalam had a total population of 567 with 280 males and 287 females. The sex ratio was 1025. The literacy rate was 78.13.
