= Pugal Sillathur =

- village
- Country: India
- State: Tamil Nadu
- District: Thanjavur
- Taluk: Orathanadu

Population (2001)
  - Total: 598

Languages
  - Official: Tamil
- Time zone: UTC+5:30 (IST)

Pugal Sillathur is a village in the Orathanadu taluk of Thanjavur district, Tamil Nadu, India.

== Demographics ==
As per the 2001 census, Pugal Sillathur had a total population of 598 with 304 males and 294 females. The sex ratio was 967. The literacy rate was 36.26.
