= Vadakkukottai =

- village
- Country: India
- State: Tamil Nadu
- District: Thanjavur
- Taluk: Orathanadu

Population (2001)
  - Total: 1,006

Languages
  - Official: Tamil
- Time zone: UTC+5:30 (IST)

Vadakkukottai is a village in the Orathanadu taluk of Thanjavur district, Tamil Nadu, India.

== Demographics ==
As per the 2001 census, Vadakkukottai had a total population of 1006 with 510 males and 496 females. The sex ratio was 973. The literacy rate was 72.09.
