= Thoppuviduthy =

- village
- Country: India
- State: Tamil Nadu
- District: Thanjavur
- Taluk: Orathanadu

Population (2001)
  - Total: 2,960

Languages
  - Official: Tamil
- Time zone: UTC+5:30 (IST)

Thoppuviduthy is a village in the Orathanadu taluk of Thanjavur district, Tamil Nadu, India.

== Demographics ==
As per the 2001 census, Thoppuviduthy had a total population of 2960 with 1456 males and 1504 females. The sex ratio was 1033. The literacy rate was 60.91.
