= L. Ganesan =

Indian politician (1934–2026)

Member of parliament, Lok Sabha
- In office 16 May 2004 – 16 May 2009
- Preceded by: Dalit Ezhilmalai
- Succeeded by: P. Kumar
- Constituency: Tiruchirappalli

Member of Parliament, Rajya Sabha
- In office 30 June 1980 – 29 June 1986
- Constituency: Tamil Nadu

Personal details
- Born: 24 April 1934 Kannathangudi, Orathanadu, Tanjore, Madras Presidency, British India
- Died: 4 January 2026 (aged 91) Thanjavur, Tamil Nadu, India
- Party: Dravida Munnetra Kazhagam
- Spouse: Kamala
- Children: 2 sons and 1 daughter
- As of 22 September, 2006

Loganathan Ganesan (24 April 1934 – 4 January 2026) was an Indian politician. He was a member of the 14th Lok Sabha of India. Ganesan represented the Tiruchirappalli constituency of Tamil Nadu and was a member of DMK. He was sometimes called Mozhipor Thalapathi.

Ganesan was the only politician involved in Tamil Nadu politics post-independence to have been a representative in the Lok Sabha (M.P.), Rajya Sabha (M.P.), Tamil Nadu Legislative Assembly (M.L.A.) and Tamil Nadu Legislative Council (M.L.C.).

== Early life ==
L. Ganesan also called as LG was born at Kannathangudi East of Orathanadu taluk in Thanjavur district in Tamil Nadu as a son of Late Loganathan Kandapillai in a Kallar family.

He was hailed as “Mozhipor Thalapathy” (linguistic war commander).

== Career ==
Ganesan joined DMK in law school. He was also imprisoned under the MISA act. He was the chief of the Anti-Hindi Agitation in 1965.

In December 2006, Marumalarchi Dravida Munnetra Kazhagam (MDMK) general secretary Vaiko "temporarily" relieved the party's presidium chairman L. Ganesan and deputy general secretary Gingee N. Ramachandran of all posts and responsibilities for indulging in "anti-party activities".

In July 2008, he was expelled from the MDMK after voting against the UPA government.

After his service for Chief Minister Karunanidhi, he broke ranks with Kalaignar and other DMK leaders, and along with Vaiko, Gingee Ramachandran, N. Kannappan and Nanjil Sampath, formed MDMK.

== Death ==
Ganesan died in Thanjavur, Tamil Nadu on 4 January 2026, at the age of 91.
