= Kilamangalam =

- village
- Country: India
- State: Tamil Nadu
- District: Thanjavur

Population (2001)
  - Total: 2,372

Languages
  - Official: Tamil
- Time zone: UTC+5:30 (IST)
- Postal code: 614 615

Kilamangalam is a village in the Orathanadu taluk of Thanjavur district, Tamil Nadu, India.

== Demographics ==
As per the 2001 census, Kilamangalam had a total population of 2372 with 1140 males and 1232 females. The sex ratio was 1081. The literacy rate was 57.52.
