= Paruthiapparkoil =

- village
- Interactive map of Paruthiapparkoil
- Country: India
- State: Tamil Nadu
- District: Thanjavur
- Taluk: Orathanadu

Population (2001)
  - Total: 677

Languages
  - Official: Tamil
- Time zone: UTC+5:30 (IST)

Paruthiapparkoil (also known as Paruthiapparkoyil or Paruthiapparkovil, Tamil பருத்தியப்பர்கோயில் lit. 'cotton temple') is a historic temple complex located in the Orathanadu taluk of Thanjavur district, in Tamil Nadu, India.

== History ==
The temple was constructed during the reign of Rajaraja I (985-1014 CE), known for commissioning numerous temples throughout South India, including the famous Brihadeeswara Temple at Thanjavur. Paruthiapparkoil represents the early Dravidian architectural style that flourished under the Chola patronage. Archaeological evidence suggests that the site may have been a place of worship even before the Chola period, with some stone inscriptions dating back to the 7th century CE during the Pallava dynasty.

== Conservation efforts ==
In 2008, the Archaeological Survey of India undertook restoration work to preserve the deteriorating structures and carvings. The temple was added to the UNESCO tentative list for World Heritage Sites in 2014.

== Demographics ==
As per the 2001 census, Paruthiapparkoil had a total population of 677 with 330 males and 347 females. The sex ratio was 1052. The literacy rate was 71.69%.
