= Neiveli Tenpathy =

- Village
- Country: India
- State: Tamil Nadu
- District: Thanjavur
- Taluk: Orathanadu

Population (2011)
  - Total: 3,539

Languages
  - Official: Tamil
- Time zone: UTC+5:30 (IST)

Neiveli Tenpathy is a village in the Orathanadu taluk of Thanjavur district, Tamil Nadu, India.

== Demographics ==
In 2011, Neiveli Tenpathy had a total population of 3539 with 1814 males and 1725 females. The sex ratio was 951. The literacy rate was 72.92%. The village is administered by Sarpanch.
