= Durai Govindarajan =

Indian politician

Durai Govindarajan is an Indian politician and former Member of the Legislative Assembly of Tamil Nadu. He was elected to the Tamil Nadu legislative assembly as an Anna Dravida Munnetra Kazhagam candidate from Thiruvonam constituency in 1977 election, and from Tiruvaiyaru constituency in 1984 election.
