= Thekkur =

- village
- Country: India
- State: Tamil Nadu
- District: Thanjavur
- Taluk: Orathanadu

Government
  - Panchayat President: SENTHIL NATHAN

Population (2001)
  - Total: 5,503

Languages
  - Official: Tamil
- Time zone: UTC+5:30 (IST)
- PIN: 614902
- Telephone code: 04372

Thekkur is a village in the Orathanadu taluk of Thanjavur district, Tamil Nadu, India.

== Demographics ==
As per the 2001 census, Thekkur had a total population of 5503 with 2692 males and 2811 females. The sex ratio was 1044. The literacy rate was 70.24.

one higher secondary school and one elementary school is there.
