= Kelavannipet =

Keelavannippattu
- village
- Nickname: Raja Gramam Keelavannipattu
- Interactive map of Keelavannippattu
- Coordinates: 10.621202°N 79.324263°E
- Country: India
- State: Tamil Nadu
- District: Thanjavur

Population (2001)
  - Total: 1,983

Languages
  - Official: Tamil
- Time zone: UTC+5:30 (IST)

Keelavannippattu is a village in the Orathanadu taluk of Thanjavur district, Tamil Nadu, India.

== Demographics ==
As per the 2001 census, Kelavannipet had a total population of 1983 with 954 males and 1029 females. The sex ratio was 1079. The literacy rate was 63.19.
