= Mela Ulur =

Mela Uzhavoor (Known as "Mela Ulur") is a village in Thanjavur district, Tamil Nadu, India Orathanadu thaluka.
