= Panjanathikottai =

- village
- Country: India
- State: Tamil Nadu
- District: Thanjavur
- Taluk: Orathanadu

Population (2001)
  - Total: 2,244

Languages
  - Official: Tamil
- Time zone: UTC+5:30 (IST)

Panjanathikottai is a village in the Orathanadu taluk of Thanjavur district, Tamil Nadu, India.

== Demographics ==
As per the 2001 census, Panjanathikottai had a total population of 2244 with 1151 males and 1093 females. The sex ratio was 950. The literacy rate was 65.62.
