= Kakkarai =

Coordinates: 10°37′N 79°17′E

- village
- Interactive map of Kakkarai
- Country: India
- State: Tamil Nadu
- District: Thanjavur

Population (2001)
  - Total: 1,495

Languages
  - Official: Tamil
- Time zone: UTC+5:30 (IST)

Kakkarai is a village in the Orathanadu taluk of Thanjavur district, Tamil Nadu, India.

== Demographics ==
As per the 2001 census, Kakkarai had a total population of 1,495 with 730 males and 765 females. The sex ratio was 1.048. The literacy rate was 70.44%.
