= Poyyundarkudikadu =

- village
- Country: India
- State: Tamil Nadu
- District: Thanjavur
- Taluk: Orathanadu

Population (2022)
  - Total: 2,450

Languages
  - Official: Tamil
- Time zone: UTC+5:30 (IST)
- Postal code: 614625

Poyyundarkudikadu is a village in the Orathanadu taluk of Thanjavur district, Tamil Nadu, India.

== Demographics ==
As per the 2001 census, Poyyundarkudikadu had a total population of 1224 with 620 males and 604 females. The sex ratio was 974. The literacy rate was 63.37.
