= Thondarampet West =

Thondarampattu West
- village
- Country: India
- State: Tamil Nadu
- District: Thanjavur
- Taluk: Orathanadu

Population (2001)
  - Total: 1,712

Languages
  - Official: Tamil
- Time zone: UTC+5:30 (IST)

Thondarampattu West is a village in the Orathanadu taluk of Thanjavur district, Tamil Nadu, India. This village is famous for National Level Kabaddi Match. Thondarampattu West village is located in Orathanadu Tehsil of Thanjavur district in Tamil Nadu, India. It is situated 12 km (7.5 mi) from sub-district headquarters Orathanadu and 35 km (22 mi) away from district headquarters Thanjavur. As per 2009 stats, Thondarampattu is the gram panchayat of Thondarampattu West village.

The total geographical area of village is 486.88 hectares (1,203.1 acres). Thondarampattu West has a total population of 1,888 peoples. There are about 475 houses in Thondarampattu West village. Orathanadu is nearest town to Thondarampattu West.

== Demographics ==
As per the 2001 census, Thondarampattu West had a total population of 1712 with 819 males and 893 females. The sex ratio was 1090. The literacy rate was 70.78.
