= Pulavankadu =

Coordinates: 10°35′N 79°16′E

- village
- Interactive map of Pulavankadu
- Country: India
- State: Tamil Nadu
- District: Thanjavur
- Taluk: Orathanadu

Population (2001)
  - Total: 1,665

Languages
  - Official: Tamil
- Time zone: UTC+5:30 (IST)

Pulavankadu is a village in the Orathanadu taluk of Thanjavur district, Tamil Nadu, India.

== Demographics ==
As per the 2001 census, Pulavankadu had a total population of 1665 with 804 males and 861 females. The sex ratio was 1071. The literacy rate was 73.72.
