= Karaimeendarkottai =

- village
- Interactive map of Karaimeendarkottai
- Country: India
- State: Tamil Nadu
- District: Thanjavur

Population (2001)
  - Total: 1,212

Languages
  - Official: Tamil
- Time zone: UTC+5:30 (IST)

Karaimeendarkottai is a village in the Orathanadu taluk of Thanjavur district, Tamil Nadu, India.

== Demographics ==
As per the 2001 census, Karaimeendarkottai had a total population of 1212 with 597 males and 615 females. The sex ratio was 1.030. The literacy rate was 69.39.
