= Vadakkur North =

- village
- Country: India
- State: Tamil Nadu
- District: Thanjavur
- Taluk: Orathanadu

Population (2013)
  - Total: 2,113

Languages
  - Official: Tamil
- Time zone: UTC+5:30 (IST)

Vadakkur North is a village in the Orathanadu taluk of Thanjavur district, Tamil Nadu, India.

Vadakkur is a village in Orattanadu Taluk in Thanjavur District in Tamil Nadu State. Vadakkur is 11 km far from its Taluk Main Town Orattanadu. Vadakkur is located 15 km distance from its District Main City Thanjavur. It is located 335 km distance from its State Main City Chennai.

== Demographics ==
As per the 2001 census, Vadakkur North had a total population of 2248 with 1120 males and 1128 females. The sex ratio was 1022. The literacy rate was 65.21.
