= Moorthiambalpuram =

- village
- Interactive map of Moorthiambalpuram
- Country: India
- State: Tamil Nadu
- District: Thanjavur
- Taluk: Orathanadu

Population (2001)
  - Total: 907

Languages
  - Official: Tamil
- Time zone: UTC+5:30 (IST)

Moorthiambalpuram is a village in the Orathanadu taluk of Thanjavur district, Tamil Nadu, India.

== Demographics ==
As per the 2001 census, Moorthiambalpuram had a total population of 907 with 435 males and 472 females. The sex ratio was 1085. The literacy rate was 56.64.
