= Neyveli Vadapathy =

Neivelivadapathy
- village
- Country: India
- State: Tamil Nadu
- District: Thanjavur
- Taluk: Orathanadu

Population (2001)
  - Total: 5,134

Languages
  - Official: Tamil
- Time zone: UTC+5:30 (IST)

Neivelivadapathy is a village in the Orathanadu taluk of Thanjavur district, Tamil Nadu, India.

== Demographics ==
As per the 2001 census, Neivelivadapathy had a total population of 5134 with 2563 males and 2571 females. The sex ratio was 1003. The literacy rate was 56.63.

Panchayat President: Pandian Kunjappa and Vice President: Natesan R (Pallaththanamani Street)

Post Office Details Of Neivelivadapathy in Thanjavur, India

Contact Address: Postmaster, Post Office Neivelivadapathy, Thanjavur, Tamil Nadu (TN), India (IN), Pin Code:- 614628 Pin Code: 614628 State: Tamil Nadu District: Thanjavur Post Office: Neivelivadapathy Post Office Neivelivadapathy, Thanjavur

Schools

- 5 - Panchayat Union Primary School corresponding School ids are 30069, 30070, 30071, 30072, 30073
- Union Middle School Narippaththai, Neivelyvadapathy
- Govt Higher Secondary School Neivelithenpathy

Temples

- Ayyanaar Temple,
- Karuppaiah Temple,
- Maruthappa temple,
- Muniyappachi Temple
- Thottathumuni Temple,

Pallathaanmani Street

- Ayyanaar Temple
- Pathrakaliamman Temple

Naripaththai Street

- Peththapermal Temple

chetti Street

- Suppaiya pillaiyar temple
- Selva vinayakar temple
- Chetti vinayakar temple
