= Keelulur =

- village
- Country: India
- State: Tamil Nadu
- District: Thanjavur

Population (2001)
  - Total: 1,232

Languages
  - Official: Tamil
- Time zone: UTC+5:30 (IST)

Keelulur is a village in the Orathanadu taluk of Thanjavur district, Tamil Nadu, India.

== Demographics ==
As per the 2001 census, Keelulur had a total population of 1314 with 628 males and 686 females. The sex ratio was 1092. The literacy rate was 75.87.
