= Kovilur, Thanjavur =

Kovilur
- village
- Country: India
- State: Tamil Nadu
- District: Thanjavur
- Taluk: Orathanadu

Population (2001)
  - Total: 2,428

Languages
  - Official: Tamil
- Time zone: UTC+5:30 (IST)

Kovilur is a village in the Orathanadu taluk of Thanjavur district, Tamil Nadu, India.

== Demographics ==
According to the 2001 census, Kovilur had a total population of 2428 with 1203 males and 1225 females. The sex ratio was 1018. The literacy rate was 69.15.
