= Unjividuthy =

- village
- Country: India
- State: Tamil Nadu
- District: Thanjavur
- Taluk: Orathanadu

Population (2019)
  - Total: 4,000 May differed

Languages
  - Official: Tamil
- Time zone: UTC+5:30 (IST)

Unjividuthy is a village in the Orathanadu taluk of Thanjavur district, Tamil Nadu, India.

== Demographics ==
As per the 2001 census, Unjividuthy had a total population of 3090 with 1538 males and 1552 females. The sex ratio was 1009. The literacy rate was 65.08.
