= Vellur =

Vellur Agricultural area
- village
- Location in Tamil Nadu, India
- Coordinates: 10°35′9″N 79°13′27″E
- Country: India
- State: Tamil Nadu
- District: thanjavur

Population (2001)
  - Total: 3,587

Languages
  - Official: Tamil

Community
  - Caste: [vellalar pillai] Kallar, Thevar
  - Sub Castes: Athiyaman, Kandiyar, VijayaThevar, Poyundar, Nattar, Vandaiyar, Senapathiyar
- Time zone: UTC+5:30 (IST)
- PIN: 614626

Vellur is a village in the Orathanadu taluk of Thanjavur district in the Indian state of Tamil Nadu. Vellur, also known as Vellur Nadu, is an agricultural village.

== Etymology ==
The name Vellur is derived from the Tamil words: Vel (வேல்) meaning "spear", Oor – "village"; thus meaning "village of spear".

== Geography ==
The village is located approximately 352 kilometers away from the state capital, Chennai, and is 80 kilometers from Tiruchirappalli.

Vellur's boundaries include boroughs such as Periyakumilai, Mela theru, Keelatheru, Eda theru, Alathan kudikadu, Kothaiyakadu, Puthuvalavu and Therkukkadu. The boundary resembles that of a spear, potentially indicating an origin of the name. Another village of the same name is situated in the Kannur district of Kerala.

The spear is said to be the main weapon of the Hindu deity Murugan, or "Velayudayaan" (one who bears the spear). The word literally means "The place of Murugan".

Pillaiyar kovil are location periyakumulai and melatheru Mariamman Kovil and school are there. The main deity in this village is Sri Muthu Mariyamman. Manora is an eight-story miniature fortress near the Bay of Bengal. Pattukkottai Nadiyamman temple, Orathanadu Kasi Viswanathar temple, and Urantharayan kudikadu Periya kovil are there.

== Culture ==
Vellur village has several temples including Sivan, Vinayaga, Sri Muthu Mariyamman, and Sri Muthu Muni Ayyanar and Muninrswaran. Every year in the Tamil month of Chithrai the village celebrates the Car festival.

== History ==
Orathanadu Taluk was formerly subdivided into 18 Nadus (group of villages), each having a Nattamai (village chief). If any disputes arose that the village was unable to resolve by itself, the issue was passed onto the Nattamai, who would deliver a judgement. Among the Nadus were Papanadu, Uranthainadu, Vellur Nadu, Konur Nadu, Kakkarai Nadu and Thennamar Nadu. A relatively well-known/historical temple called "avutaiyamman " exists in the Village. It is considered the oldest temple in the Thanjavur District.

== Transport ==
Bus lines connect Vellur to Thanjavur and Pattukkottai.

== Demographics ==
The residents of the village are Tamilians. At the 2001 census, Vellur had a total population of 2587 with 1297 males and 1290 females. The percentage of literate people out of the population was 71.48%. Most people belong to the Pillai (Vellalar) and Kallar Community: Athiyaman, Kandiyar, Vijayathevar and Nattar, Poyuntar. The Yadava people also live at Edatheru.
