= P. Rajamanickam =

Indian politician

P. Rajamanickam was elected to the Tamil Nadu Legislative Assembly from the Orathanad constituency in the 1996 elections. He was a candidate of the Dravida Munnetra Kazhagam (DMK) party.
