= Arumulai =

- village
- Country: India
- State: Tamil Nadu
- District: Thanjavur

Population (2001)
  - Total: 958

Languages
  - Official: Tamil
- Time zone: UTC+5:30 (IST)

Arumulai is a village in the Orathanadu taluk of Thanjavur district, Tamil Nadu, India.

== Demographics ==
As per the 2001 census, Arumulai had a total population of 958 with 488 males and 470 females. The sex ratio was 1085. The literacy rate was 64.58.
