= Thalayamangalam =

- village
- Country: India
- State: Tamil Nadu
- District: Thanjavur
- Taluk: Orathanadu

Population (2001)
  - Total: 1,741

Languages
  - Official: Tamil
- Time zone: UTC+5:30 (IST)

Thalayamangalam is a village in the Orathanadu taluk of Thanjavur district, Tamil Nadu, India.

== Demographics ==
As per the 2001 census, Thalayamangalam had a total population of 1741 with 877 males and 864 females. The sex ratio was 985. The literacy rate was 67.88.
