= Vandayarriruppu =

- village
- Country: India
- State: Tamil Nadu
- District: Thanjavur
- Taluk: Orathanadu

Population (2001)
  - Total: 1,844

Languages
  - Official: Tamil
- Time zone: UTC+5:30 (IST)

Vandayarriruppu is a village in the Orathanadu taluk of Thanjavur district, Tamil Nadu, India.

== Demographics ==
As per the 2001 census, Vandayarriruppu had a total population of 1844 with 945 males and 899 females. The sex ratio was 951. The literacy rate was 73.1.
