= Avidanalla Vijayapuram =

- village
- Location in Tamil Nadu, India Avidanalla Vijayapuram (India)
- Coordinates: 10°31′51″N 79°16′20″E
- Country: India
- State: Tamil Nadu
- District: Thanjavur

Population (2001)
  - Total: 2,594

Languages
  - Official: Tamil
- Time zone: UTC+5:30 (IST)

Avidanalla Vijayapuram is a village in the Orathanadu taluk of Thanjavur district, Tamil Nadu, India.

== Demographics ==
As per the 2001 census, Avidanalla Vijayapuram had a total population of 2594 with 1256 males and 1338 females. The gender ratio was 1065, and the literacy rate was 70.34.
