= Vadaseri North =

- Village
- Country: India
- State: Tamil Nadu
- District: Thanjavur
- Taluk: Orathanadu

Government
  - Panchayat President: Nandhakumar
  - Panchayat Union Councillor: Rajasekaran Manickam Thevar

Population (2001)
  - Total: 4,496

Languages
  - Official: Tamil
- Time zone: UTC+5:30 (IST)

Vadaseri North is a village in the Orathanadu taluk of Thanjavur district, Tamil Nadu, India.

== Geography ==
Vadaseri North is located 17 kilometres from Orattanadu, 42 kilometres east of Thanjavur, and 342 kilometres from the State capital, Chennai.

== Demographics ==
As per the 2001 census, Vadaseri North had a total population of 4496 with 2222 males and 2274 females. The sex ratio was 1023. The literacy rate was 70.95.
