= Paruthikottai =

Coordinates: 10.3500°N 79.3833°E

- village
- Interactive map of Paruthikottai
- Country: India
- State: Tamil Nadu
- District: Thanjavur
- Taluk: Orathanadu

Population (2001)
  - Total: 2,433

Languages
  - Official: Tamil
- Time zone: UTC+5:30 (IST)

Paruthikottai is a village in BA M.Rajalakshmi

Date 30/4/22

Outlet.kurinji

Location.*pattukottai

Today present sir Orathanadu taluk of Thanjavur district, Tamil Nadu, India.

== Demographics ==
As per the 2001 census, Paruthikottai had a total population of 2433 with 1194 males and 1239 females. The literacy rate was 66.61.
