= Ayangudi, Cuddalore =

Ayangudi ஆயங்குடி
- Village
- Ayangudi
- Location in Tamil Nadu, India
- Country: India
- State: Tamil Nadu
- District: Cuddalore
- Elevation: 40 m (130 ft)

Population (2011)
  - Total: 5,000

Languages
  - Official: Tamil,English
- Time zone: UTC+5:30 (IST)
- Postal code: 608306
- Telephone code: 04144-264***
- Vehicle registration: TN 91

Ayangudi is an Indian village located in Kattumannarkoil taluk in the Cuddalore, Tamil Nadu, India. It is located 73 kilometres (45 mi) to the south of the district headquarters Cuddalore, 13 kilometres (8.1 mi) from Kattumannarkoil and 225 km from State capital Chennai.

The average sex ratio of Ayangudi is 1,087, which is higher than the Tamil Nadu state average of 2,500. The child sex ratio for Ayangudi, as per the census, is 4,000, higher than the Tamil Nadu average of 4,500.

Ayangudi has a higher literacy rate compared to the Tamil Nadu average. In 2018, the village recorded a literacy rate of 83.99%, exceeding the state's average of 80.09%. Male literacy in Ayangudi stood at 89.23%, while female literacy was 79.23%.

== Education institutions ==
- Muslim High School – Ayangudi
- Al-Ameen Nursery & Primary School – Ayangudi
- Government Elementary School – Ayangudi & Melappakathurai

== Health ==
- Ayangudi Government Primary Health Centre Pharmacy
- West way society medical center
- AR Medical
- Clinic
