= Adanakottai =

- village
- Nickname: modern village
- Location in Tamil Nadu, India Adanakottai (India)
- Coordinates: 10°35′5″N 79°10′51″E
- Country: India
- State: Tamil Nadu
- District: Thanjavur

Population (2001)
  - Total: 1,664

Languages
  - Official: Tamil
- Time zone: UTC+5:30 (IST)
- Postal code: 614902

Adhanakottai is a village in the Orathanadu taluk of Thanjavur district, Tamil Nadu, India.

== Demographics ==
As per the 2001 census, Adhanakottai had a total population of 1664 with 796 males and 868 females. The sex ratio was 1090. The literacy rate was 66.51.

It is located 20 km (12 mi) south of thanjavur on the banks of river Kauveri. It has received the award "model village" from the president Abdul Kalam. The main occupation of Adhanakottai residents is agriculture, dairy.
