= Alivoikkal =

Azhiyavaikkal Kasavalanadu Azhiyavaikkal
- village
- Location in Tamil Nadu, India Azhiyavaikkal (India)
- Coordinates: 10°40′18″N 79°12′21″E
- Country: India
- State: Tamil Nadu
- District: Thanjavur

Government
  - Panchayat President: Mr.Govindrajan

Population (2001)
  - Total: 3,717

Languages
  - Official: Tamil
- Time zone: UTC+5:30 (IST)
- Postal code: 614904

Azhiyavaikkal is a village in the Orathanadu taluk of Thanjavur district, Tamil Nadu, India.

== Demographics ==
As per the 2001 census, Azhiyavaikkal had a total population of 3717 with 1783 males and 1934 females. The sex ratio was 1085. The literacy rate was 63.79.
