= Vadakkur South =

- village
- Country: India
- State: Tamil Nadu
- District: Thanjavur
- Taluk: Orathanadu

Government
  - Panchayat President: Ramaiyan G

Population (2001)
  - Total: 1,917

Languages
  - Official: Tamil
- Time zone: UTC+5:30 (IST)

Vadakkur South is a village in the Orathanadu taluk of Thanjavur district, Tamil Nadu, India.

== Demographics ==
As per the 2001 census, Vadakkur South had a total population of 1917 with 924 males and 993 females. The sex ratio was 1075. The literacy rate was 68.11.

== Sub-villages ==
Vadakkur South had the following sub-villages: Chellampatti (Chellampatty), Iyyampatty, Karupatypatty (Karuppattipatti), and Saravan Theru.
