= Pinnayur East =

Pinnaiyur East and Pinnaiyur West Pinnaiyur
- Village
- Nickname: Pinnaiyur Naadu
- Country: India
- State: Tamil Nadu
- District: Thanjavur
- Taluk: Thiruvonam

Area
  - Total: 6.4607 km^{2} (2.4945 sq mi)

Population (2011)
  - Total: 5,123 East+West&Vadakunatham
  - Density: 792.9/km^{2} (2,054/sq mi)

Languages
  - Official: Tamil

Community
  - Caste: Kallar, Thevar,
  - Sub Castes: Kalingarayar, Kandiyar, Saluvar, Pinnundar, Kandar, Olugundar and Cholagar
- Time zone: UTC+5:30 (IST)

Pinnaiyur West and Pinnayur East is a village in Thanjavur district of the Indian state of Tamil Nadu. It is located in Orathanadu taluk.

== Demographics ==
As of 2011 census, Pinnaiyur West had a population of 2,384. The total population constitute, 1,163 males and 1,221 females —a sex ratio of 1050 females per 1000 males. 190 children are in the age group of 0–6 years, of which 95 are boys and 95 are girls. The average literacy rate stands at 80.45% with 1,765 literates.
