= Kaduvettividuthy =

Kaduvettividuthy Kaduvettividuthi
- village
- Country: India
- State: Tamil Nadu
- District: Thanjavur

Population (2001)
  - Total: 4,007

Languages
  - Official: Tamil
- Time zone: UTC+5:30 (IST)
- Postal code: 614614

Kaduvettividuthy is a village in Thanjavur District, Tamil Nadu.

== Demographics ==
As per the 2001 census, Kaduvettividuthi had a total population of 4007 with 2018 males and 1989 females. The sex ratio was 986. The literacy rate was 56.79.

== Kaduvettividuthi V.Swaminathan ==
Mill sealed in Namakkal dt. From the hindhu

It was grinding ration rice for use as cattle and chicken feed District Supply Officials and Civil Supply Officials who conducted an intensive raid at Patanachampatti and Karadiyanur villages in Rasipuram Taluk on Friday sealed a rice mill. The officials alleged that the mill was grinding rice supplied under the Public Distribution System (PDS) and distributing it as feed for cattle and chicken. District Supply Officer V. Swaminathan who headed the raid told The Hindu that a total three mills were raided on Friday following information received by the District Collector the previous day that rice distributed for consumption by ration card holders was illegally sold by some miscreants and was being used as cattle feed. "We caught one such mill red-handed when ration rice was mixed with other grains and when the grinding was in progress. "A total of 200 kilograms of full rice was also seized from that mill," the DSO said. "The owner of the mill pleaded innocence, saying he only used the rice that he had got from the PDS outlet with his family card as feed for cattle," Mr. Swaminathan added. "For this reason we sealed his mill and also seized his family card for misuse of the rice," the DSO added. "In another mill we found 50 bags of broken rice – suspected to be ration rice – and are waiting for quality control officials from the Civil Supplies Corporation to confirm it," he said. "According to information received by us, the mills broke the smuggled ration rice at night and made it difficult for the officials to differentiate them from other rice," Mr. Swaminathan alleged. Raids were also conducted at nearby poultry units and cattle sheds to check such misuse, he stated. Similar raids will continue on a regular basis to put an end to such misuse and to ensure that the government's aim of making rice available to deserving beneficiaries is attained, he added. Rasipuram Taluk Supply Officer T. Tirumurugan was also present during the raid that was conducted.

Sponsored by All India Anna Dravida Munnetra Kazhagam has been duly elected to fill the seat in that House from the above Constituency.

Place: Namakkal, V. SWAMINATHAN, Date: 13 May 2011. Returning Officer, 92. Rasipuram (SC) Assembly Constituency and District Supply and Consumer Protection Officer, Namakkal. Election to the Tamil Nadu Legislative Assembly

== Kaduvettividuthi Sri Idumban swami temple ==
Kavadi is steeped in mythology. At Mount Kailas, Lord Shiva entrusted the dwarf saint sage Agastya with two hillocks, the Shivagiri Hill and the Shaktigiri Hill, with instructions to carry and install them in South India. The sage left them in a forest and later asked his disciple, Idumban, to get them. Idumban found the two hillocks but could not initially lift them, until he obtained divine help. Near Palani in South India — where there is a famous shrine of Murugan — Idumban put the hillocks down to rest awhile. When he attempted to continue with his journey, he found that the hillocks were immovable.

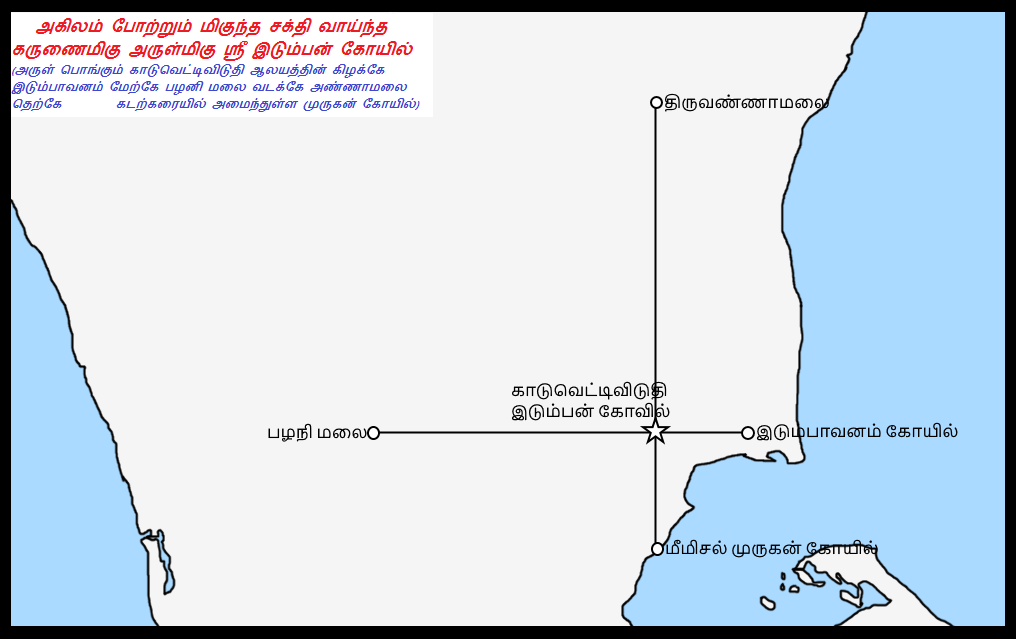
இடும்பன்

Idumban sought the help of a scantily dressed youth, but the youth claimed the hillocks belonged to him. In the ensuing scuffle, Idumban was defeated. Idumban then realised that the youth was Lord Murugan. At this stage, Muruga had been outwitted in a contest for going round the world where his brother Ganapati had won the prized fruit. In anger, the frustrated child left the divine parents and came down to Tiru Avinankudi at the Adivaram (pronounced Adivâram and means foot of the Sivagiri Hill). Siva pacified Him by saying that He (Subrahmanya) Himself was the fruit (pazham) of all wisdom and knowledge. Later, Murugan withdrew to the hill and settled there as a recluse in peace and solitude.

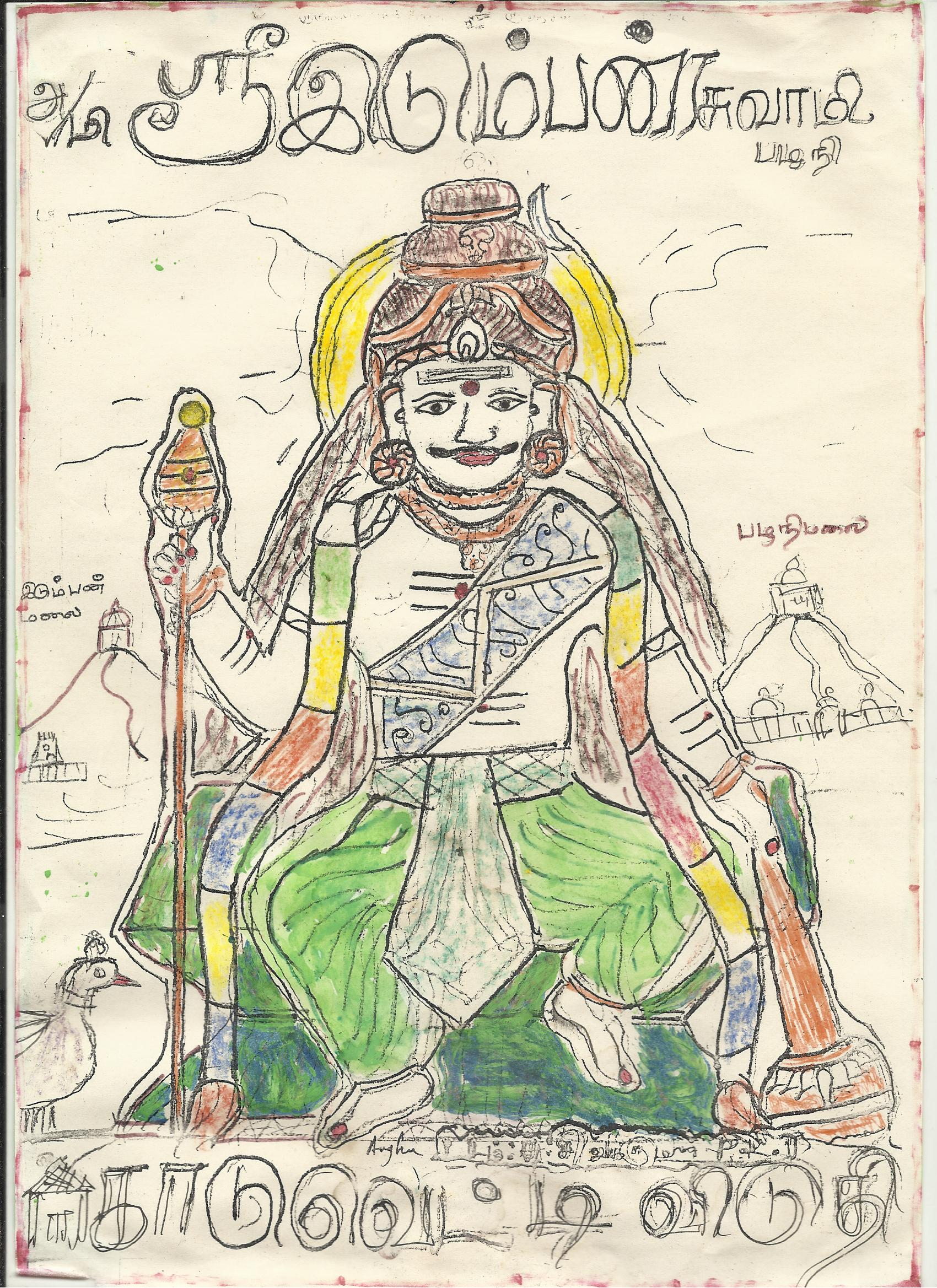
இடும்பன்

Muruga had made it impossible for Idumban to lift the hillocks. In the fierce battle that ensued, Idumban was killed but was later on restored to life. Idumban prayed that whoever carried on his shoulders the kavadi — signifying the two hills — and visited the temple on a vow should be blessed and that He (Idumban)should be given the privilege of standing sentinel at the entrance to the hill. Hence the Idumban shrine is halfway up the hill where every pilgrim is expected to offer obeisance to Idumban before entering the temple of Dandâyudhapani. Since then, pilgrims to Palani bring their offerings on their shoulders in a kavadi. The custom has spread from Palani to all Muruga shrines worldwide.
