= Ambalapattu =

- village
- Nickname: Aambal
- Location in Tamil Nadu, India Ambalapattu (India)
- Coordinates: 10°31′33″N 79°18′29″E
- Country: India
- State: Tamil Nadu
- District: Thanjavur
- Taluk: Orathanadu
- Post Office: Ambalapattu North (Iluppaiththoppu), Ambalapattu Southm, Parangivettikadu
- PIN: 614626
- Established: 23-01-2013

Government
  - Type: Rural

Languages
  - Official: Tamil
- Time zone: UTC+5:30 (IST)
- Postal code: [614626]
- Vehicle registration: TN-49

Ambalapattu is a name common to several villages located in Orathanadu taluk, Thanjavur district, Tamil Nadu, India.

The 2011 India census has separate records for Ambalapattu North, Ambalapattu South and Ambalapattu South Sivakollai.

== Demographics ==
=== Ambalapattu North ===
As of the 2011 India census, the population was 3554, of those 1628 are male and 1926 female.

=== Ambalapattu South ===
As of the 2011 India census, the population was 2302, of those 1070 are male and 1232 female.

=== Ambalapattu South Sivakollai ===
As of the 2011 India census, the population was 1581, of those 782 are male and 799 female.
