= Vengarai Periakottainadu =

Vengarai Periyakottaikadu
- village
- Interactive map of Vengarai Periyakottaikadu
- Coordinates: 10°25′33″N 79°10′26″E
- Country: India
- State: Tamil Nadu
- District: Thanjavur
- Taluk: Orathanadu

Population (2001)
  - Total: 1,325

Languages
  - Official: Tamil
- Time zone: UTC+5:30 (IST)

Vengarai Periyakottaikadu is a village in the Orathanadu taluk of Thanjavur district, Tamil Nadu, India.

== Demographics ==
As per the 2001 census, Vengarai Periyakottaikadu had a total population of 1325 with 631 males and 692 females. The sex ratio was 1100. The literacy rate was 67.01.
