= Vengarai Thippanvidudhi =

- village
- Interactive map of Vengarai Thippanvidudhi
- Coordinates: 10°26′42″N 79°10′00″E
- Country: India
- State: Tamil Nadu
- District: Thanjavur
- Taluk: Orathanadu

Population (2001)
  - Total: 1,794

Languages
  - Official: Tamil
- Time zone: UTC+5:30 (IST)

Vengarai Thippanvidudhi is a village in the Orathanadu taluk of Thanjavur district, Tamil Nadu, India.

== Demographics ==
As per the 2001 census, Vengarai Thippanvidudhi had a total population of 1794 with 851 males and 943 females. The sex ratio was 1108. The literacy rate was 53.61.
