= Kavarapattu =

Kavarapattu amirtha ooru
- villages
- Nickname: chinna singapore
- Country: India
- State: Tamil Nadu
- District: Thanjavur

Population (2001)
  - Total: 1,232

Languages
  - Official: Tamil
- Time zone: UTC+5:30 (IST)

Kavarapattu is a village in the Orathanadu taluk of Thanjavur district, Tamil Nadu, India.

== Demographics ==
As per the 2001 census, Kavarapattu had a total population of 1232 with 558 males and 674 females. The sex ratio was 1208. The literacy rate was 60.9. The current Panchayat president is Devendiran.
