= Okkanadu Keelaiyur =

Coordinates: 10.6315152°N 79.3324732999999°E

Okkanadu Keelaiyur is a village panchayat located in the Thanjavur district of Tamil-Nadu state, India.

It is located about 293 kilometers away from Okkanadu Keelaiyur. The second-nearest state capital from Okkanadu Keelaiyur is Pondicherry, with a distance of 155.3 km. The other surrounding state capitals are Bangalore, 323.9 km away, and Thiruvananthapuram.
