= Vengarai =

Coordinates: 10°26′N 79°12′E

- village
- Interactive map of Vengarai
- Country: India
- State: Tamil Nadu
- District: Thanjavur
- Taluk: Orathanadu

Population (2001)
  - Total: 1,902

Languages
  - Official: Tamil
- Time zone: UTC+5:30 (IST)

Vengarai is a village in the Orathanadu taluk of Thanjavur district, Tamil Nadu, India.

== Demographics ==
As per the 2001 census, Vengarai had a total population of 1902 with 942 males and 960 females. The sex ratio was 1.019. The literacy rate was 62.15.
