= Kannathangudi East =

- village
- Country: India
- State: Tamil Nadu
- District: Thanjavur

Population (2001)
  - Total: 1,622

Languages
  - Official: Tamil
- Time zone: UTC+5:30 (IST)

Kannathangudi East is a village in the Orathanadu taluk of Thanjavur district, Tamil Nadu, India.

== Demographics ==
As per the 2001 census, Kannathangudi East had a total population of 1622 with 781 males and 841 females. The sex ratio was 1077. The literacy rate was 63.96.
