= Poovathur =

Poovathur Poovathur
- village
- Country: India
- State: Kerala
- District: Kannur
- Taluk: Thalassery

Population (2001)
  - Total: 2,086

Languages
  - Official: Malayalam
- Time zone: UTC+5:30 (IST)
- Postal code: 670592

Poovathur is a village in the Thalassery taluk of Kannur district, Kerala, India. It is a part of Koodali village and Koodali grama panchayat. Poovathur is located about 17.5 km east of Kannur city and 12 kms from Kannur International Airport on Kannur-Mattanur road.

It is known for the Poovathur Sri Mahavishnu Temple, which is a key cultural and religious site in the area. The temple is serene and draws visitors seeking a peaceful ambiance. Devotees primarily worship Lord Mahavishnu and Poovathoor Amma here, with special festivals such as "Pongala" celebrated annually. The temple timings are structured around morning and evening rituals, with extended hours for special events. The temple was established in 1872 AD by the feudal landlord named Kunhi Kelappan Nambiar who was the head of Koodali Thazhath Veedu family at the time.

Kakkikkarivayal Muthappan Madappura is another major temple within poovathur village.

Poovathur is also an electoral ward in Koodali, contributing to local governance and administrative functions. It is part of the larger Koodali Grama Panchayat system.

The Poovathur Temple Pond, located nearby, adds to the village’s natural landscape. This pond is close to the temple and serves as a landmark. The village also has a lower primary school, anganwadi and a public library.
