= Ayangudi, Thanjavur =

Aayangudi
- village
- Location in Tamil Nadu, India Aayangudi (India)
- Coordinates: 10°37′32″N 79°12′48″E
- Country: India
- State: Tamil Nadu
- District: Thanjavur

Population (2001)
  - Total: 1,051

Languages
  - Official: Tamil
- Time zone: UTC+5:30 (IST)

Ayangudi is a village in the Orathanadu taluk of Thanjavur district, Tamil Nadu, India.

== Demographics ==
As per the 2001 census, Ayangudi had a total population of 1051 with 530 males and 521 females. The sex ratio was 983. The literacy rate was 53.56.
