= Pudur (Orathanadu) =

Pudur Kasavalanadu Pudur
- village
- Country: India
- State: Tamil Nadu
- District: Thanjavur
- Taluk: Thanjavur

Population (2001)
  - Total: 4,495

Languages
  - Official: Tamil
- Time zone: UTC+5:30 (IST)

Pudur is a village in the Thanjavur taluk of Thanjavur district (614904), Tamil Nadu, India. Agriculture is the main source of the village. The village is located 13 km towards south from Thanjavur. In this village every year people of village celebrates the Allah festival (Muharram). High school, library, government hospital (PHC), Grama sevai Mariyam, temples, and small hotels are available in this village

== Demographics ==
As per the 2001 census, Pudur had a total population of 4495 with 2221 males and 2274 females. The sex ratio was 1024. The literacy rate was 67.65.
