= Pinnayur West =

Pinnaiyur West Pinnaiyur
- Village
- Location in Tamil Nadu, India
- Coordinates: 10°35′9″N 79°13′27″E
- Country: India
- State: Tamil Nadu
- District: Thanjavur
- Taluk: Orathanadu

Government
  - Type: Village Panchayat

Area
  - Total: 12.523 km^{2} (4.835 sq mi)

Population (2011)
  - Total: 5,000
  - Density: 400/km^{2} (1,000/sq mi)

Languages
  - Official: Tamil

Community
  - Caste: Kallar, Thevar, vellalar, SC and ST
- Time zone: UTC+5:30 (IST)
- PIN: 614902
- Vehicle registration: TN-49

Pinnaiyur is a village in Thanjavur district of the Indian state of Tamil Nadu. It is located in Orathanadu taluk.

== Demographics ==
As of 2011 census, Pinnaiyur had a population of 4453 and Vadakunatham village which is part of Pinnaiyur Nadu had a population of 678. The total population constitute, 2220 males and 2200 females.

In terms of agriculture this village is having around 2500 hectares of raw fertile land. Agriculture is the major occupation for people of this village. Pinnaiyur Nadu consists of Pinnaiyur East, Pinnaiyur West and Vadakunatham villages. The literacy rate is around 90% which is comparatively higher than any other village in Thanjavur district. Pinnaiyur is the only village which is holding dedicated local body governance system and NADU status without including any other neighbouring villages in Orathanadu taluk. Since Pinnaiyur is having large geographical area and healthy population it has been divided into Pinnaiyur East and Pinnaiyur west for administrative purpose.

== Education ==
Pinnaiyur has prominent members in the field of Medicine, Engineering, Law, Research, Arts and Science, Politics, Sports, Agriculture. M.Ramachandran MLA Orathanadu constituency belong to Pinnaiyur. Many doctors, engineers, government employees, and IT professionals have emerged from this village. Below list of educational institutes are available in Pinnaiyur.

1. Government Higher Secondary School
2. Government Elementary School, East
3. Government Elementary School, West
4. Rani Marimuthu Matriculation School

== Temples and festival ==
Pinnaiyur has the following Hindu temples, which are located in the western side of the village: Sri Thirunthandi Ayyanar, Sri Muthu Mariamman Amman, Sri Pidari Amman Sri Pillaiyar, Sri Kaliamman Amman, Sri Varatharaja Perumal, Sri Murugan, Sri Premapurishwarar and Sri Piraisoodi Amman temple. Panguni uthiram is a famous festival during summer season followed by 10 days cultural events. 8 Karai people will represent their karai during Panguni Uthiram. The festival celebrated in this historical village is very famous for its Chariot, lifted manually and carried on the shoulders of the brave people of Pinnaiyur for around 30 km by tremendous, virtually unstoppable force.

== Streets ==
Pinnaiyur is having around 10 streets including Vadakunatham. Around 1500 families were residing in it.

1. Kalingarayar Street
2. Keelakottai
3. Sirusaluvar Street
4. West Street
5. South Street
6. Vellalar Street
7. Temple Street
8. Vadakunatham
9. Sengulam Street
10. Ad colony -1
