= Orathanad =

Orathanad Mukthambalpuram
- town panchayat
- Location in Tamil Nadu, India
- Coordinates: 10.62°N 79.27°E
- Country: India
- State: Tamil Nadu
- District: Thanjavur

Area
  - Total: 7.26 km^{2} (2.80 sq mi)

Population (2011)
  - Total: 10,247
  - Density: 1,410/km^{2} (3,660/sq mi)

Languages
  - Official: Tamil
- Time zone: UTC+5:30 (IST)
- PIN: 614625
- Telephone code: 04372
- Vehicle registration: TN49
- Sex ratio: 1037 ♂/♀

Orathanad (or Mukthambalpuram; sometimes Orathanadu) is a town in Thanjavur district of the Indian state of Tamil Nadu. It is recognised as a Town Panchayat. It is located at a distance of 33 km from Thanjavur and 23 km from Mannargudi. The town is surrounded by vast agricultural lands.

== Geography and climate ==
Orathanadu has an average elevation of 2 m (6.6 ft) and lies on the south bank of the Kaveri River, 223 miles (359 km) south of Chennai. On 27 November 2008 Orathanadu broke the 65-year-old record for the highest rainfall in 24 hours in Tamil Nadu, registering 660 millimetres (26 in) and exceeding the 570 millimetres (22 in) registered by Cuddalore on 18 May 1943. However, Orathanadu lost the rainfall record to Kethi in the Nilgiris district after the town recorded 82 centimetres (32 in) of rain in 24 hours during early November 2009. .

== Demographics ==
As of 2011 census, Orathanad had a population of 10,247. The total population constitute, 4,887 males and 5,360 females —a sex ratio of 1097 females per 1000 males. 1,078 children are in the age group of 0–6 years, of which 511 are boys and 567 are girls. The average literacy rate stands at 76.54% with 7,018 literates.

As of 2001 India census, Orathanadu (Mukthambalchathram) had a population of 10,268. Males constituted 49% of the population and females 51%. Orathanadu (Mukthambalchathram) had an average literacy rate of 75%, higher than the national average of 59.5%: male literacy was 81%, and female literacy was 68%. 10% of the population was under 6 years of age.

== Education ==
Orathanad has two major educational institutions. One is Tamil Nadu Veterinary College And Research Institute and the other one is Government college of education.
