= Orathanadu Taluk =

- Mandal
- Location in Tamil Nadu, India
- Coordinates: 10°37′34″N 79°14′21″E
- Country: India
- State: Tamil Nadu
- District: Thanjavur
- Headquarters: Orathanadu

Area
  - Total: 398.41 km^{2} (153.83 sq mi)

Population (2011)
  - Total: 160,367
  - Density: 402.52/km^{2} (1,042.5/sq mi)

Languages
  - Official: Tamil
- Time zone: UTC+5:30 (IST)
- PIN: 614625

Orathanadu taluk, which is pronounced as 'Oraththanaadu' taluk, is a taluk of Thanjavur district in the Indian state of Tamil Nadu. The headquarters of the taluk are located at Orathanadu.

== Demographics ==
As of 2011 census, the taluk had a population of 1,60,367 with 40,383 households. The total population constitute, 77,719 males and 82,648 females —a sex ratio of 1063 females per 1000 males. 15,597 children are in the age group of 0–6 years, of which 8,004 are boys and 7,593 are girls. The average literacy rate stands at 75.16% with 1,08,813 literates.

== Settlements ==
The following settlements are part of Orathanadu:

- Adanakottai
- Akkarai Vattam
- Alivoikkal
- Ammankudi (Orathanadu)
- Arasapattu
- Arumulai
- Avidanalla Vijayapuram
- Ayangudi
- Chinna Ammangudi
- Cholagankudikadu
- Cholapuram
- Eachankottai
- Illupaividuthy
- Kakkarai
- Kannathangudi East
- Kannathangudi East (Addl.)
- Kannathangudi West (Addl.)
- Kannathangudi West urachi
- Karaimeendarkottai
- Karukkakottai
- Kattukuruchi
- Kavarapattu
- Keelulur
- Kelavannipet
- Kodiyalam
- Kovilur
- Kulamangalam
- Mandalakkottai
- Medayakkottai
- Moorthiambalpuram
- Moorthiambalpuram (Panayakkottai)
- Nadur
- Neivasal South
- Nemilithippiakudi
- Okkanadukeelayur (Addl.)
- Okkanadukeelayur (Chief)
- Okkanadumelayur (Part)
- Palampudur
- Palankandakudikadu
- Panayakottai
- Pandipalamavikadu
- Panjanathikottai
- Pannikondaviduthy
- Paravathur
- Paruthiapparkovil
- Paruthikottai
- Peikkarumbankottai
- Pinnayur East
- Pinnayur West
- Ponnappur (East) I
- Ponnappur (East) II
- Ponnappur (West)
- Poovathur
- Poovathur (Pudhunagar)
- Poyyundarkudikadu
- Poyyunddarkottai I
- Pudur
- Pugal Sillathur
- Pulavankadu
- Raghavambalpuram Part
- Sadaiyarkoil
- Samayamkudikadu
- Samipatti
- Surimurthypuram (Akkaravattam)
- Thalayamangalam
- Thalukkai
- Thenammanadu North
- Thennamanadu South
- Thondarampet East
- Thondarampet West
- Tirumangalakottai East
- Tirumangalakottai West
- Ulur West
- Unjividuthy
- Uranthairayankudikadu
- Vadaseri South
- Vadakkur North
- Vadakkur South
- Vadaseri North
- Vadukkukottai
- Vandayarriruppu
- Vengarai
- Vengarai Periakottainadu
- Vengarai Thippanvidudhi
- Vettikkadu
- Yoganayagipuram
