= Koradacheri block =

Koradacheri block is a revenue block in the Needamangalam taluk of Tiruvarur district, Tamil Nadu, India. It has a total of 44 panchayat villages.

== Panchayat Villages ==
1 Abivirutheeswaram

2 AGARATHIRUNALLUR

3 AMMAIYAPPAN

4 ARASAVANANKADU

5 ATHICHOZHAMANGALAM

6 ATHIKADAI

7 AYIKUDI

8 DEVERKANDANALLUR

9 ELAVANGARKUDI

10 ELAIYUR

11 ENGAN

12 ERUKATTUR

13 KAMALAPURAM

14 KAMUGAKUDI

15 KARAIYAPALAYUR

16 KALATHUR

17 KATTUR

18 KAVANUR

19 KAPPANAMANGALAM

20 KANKODUTHAVANITHAM

21 KEERANGUDI

22 MANAKKAL

23 MELARATHANALLUR

24 MELATHIRUMATHIKUNNAM

25 MUSIRIYAM

26 NAGAKUDI

27 NEIKUPPAI

28 PATHUR

29 PARUTHIYUR

30 PERUNTHARAKUDI

31 PERUMPUGALUR

32 PERUMALAGARAM

33 SEMMANGUDI

34 SELLUR

35 THIYAGARAJAPURAM

36 THIRUKANNAMANGAI

37 THIRUKKALAMBUR

38 THIRUVIDAVASAL

39 UTHIRANGUDI

40 URKUDI

41 VADAGANDAM

42 VANDAMPALAI

43 VIDAYAPURAM

44 VISWANATHAPURAM
