= Kudavasal (disambiguation) =

Kudavasal is a panchayat in Thiruvarur district, Tamil Nadu, India.

Kudavasal may also refer to:

- Kudavasal Assembly constituency, former state assembly constituency in Thiruvarur district, Tamil Nadu, India (1962–1971)
- Kudavasal taluk, a taluk in Thiruvarur district, Tamil Nadu, India
  - Alathur, Kudavasal, a village in the Kudavasal taluk
  - Kudavasal block, a revenue block in the Kudavasal taluk
- Srinivasa Perumal Temple, Kudavasal, a temple dedicated to Srinivasa in Kudavasal, Tamil Nadu, India
