= Alathur (disambiguation) =

Alathur is a town, taluk and gram panchayat in Palakkad District, Kerala, India.

Alathur may also refer to the following places in Tamil Nadu, India:

- Alathur, Kudavasal
- Alathur, Mannargudi
- Alathur, Perambalur
- Alathur, Pudukkottai
- Alathur, Thanjavur
- Alathur, Tiruchirappalli district
