= Agastisvarar Temple, Manakkal Ayyempet =

Shiva temple in Tiruvarur district, Tamil Nadu, India

Agastisvarar Temple
- Agastisvarar Temple, Manakkal Ayyempet, Tiruvarur district, Tamil Nadu

Religion
- Affiliation: Hinduism
- District: Tiruvarur
- Deity: Agastisvarar (Shiva)

Location
- Location: Manakkal Ayyempet
- State: Tamil Nadu
- Country: India
- Interactive map of Agastisvarar Temple
- Coordinates: 10.8157°N 79.5754°E

Architecture
- Type: Dravidian architecture
- Temple: One

Agastisvarar Temple is a Siva temple in Manakkal Ayyempet in Tiruvarur district in Tamil Nadu (India).

== Vaippu Sthalam ==
It is one of the shrines of the Vaippu Sthalams sung by Tamil Saivite Nayanar Appar.

== Presiding deity ==
The presiding deity is Agastisvarar. The Goddess is known as Soundaranayaki.

== Location ==
The temple is located in Tiruvarur-Kumbakonam road at a distance of 8 km. The temple is facing west.
