= Sethanipuram =

Sethanipuram is a village situated in Thiruvarur District in Tamil Nadu, India. It was part of Tanjore District under the British Raj.

‘Chaithanyapuram’ also known as ‘Sethanipuram' is a small village on the banks of the river Cauvery, situated near Sri Vanchiyam, Nachiyar Koil and Kudavasal / Nannilam. The village is located at a distance of about 21 km from Kumbakonam. As per Krishna Premi Anna’s citation in his book "South India and Brahmin History", Sethanipuram is one among the four villages to which the Shukla Yajur Vedis migrated from the north during the Chola period.

The temples in and around Agraharam themselves are a proof of the sanctity of the village. Located to the west is the Lakshmi Narayana Swamy temple which houses the renowned Kothanda Ramaswamy Sannadhi. On the eastern side stands Lord Meenakshi Sundareshwarar showering his divine blessings on the village. On the banks of River Mudikondan is the Sri Sakthi Ganapathy temple.

The patron deities Sri Sastha, Sri Kaliamman, Sri Peetapahari Amman and Sri Maha Mariamman (a.k.a. Velural) compassionately guard the village on all the four corners.

Temples are the first thing that the Kings used to construct to spread Vedas and Sastras. Meenakshi Sundareswar Swami temple, a very ancient and sanctified temple, is believed to have been constructed during that time, with utmost devotion, under the personal oversight of the Kings and it turned out to be a great monument of worship for ardent devotees of Lord Shiva.

While Lord Sri Sundareswar and Goddess Meenakshi are worshipped as principal deities, the temple includes other sannadhis where other patron deities (Parivara Devata) deities are adored. Starting with Vinayagar Sannadhi, the temple has the divine presence of Sri Subramanian Sannadhi, Gajalakshmi Sannadhi, Maha Mariamman Sannadhi, Sri Guru Bahawan Sannadhi, Sri Durga Sannadhi, Chandikeshwarar Sannadhi, Sri Meenakshi Amman Sannadhi, Sri Sivan Sannadhi, Navagraha Sannadhi, Bhairavar, Soorya & Chandran Sannadhi. The Maha mandapam and the outer Mandapam depict the true tradition, architecture and values of Chola culture.

It is believed, from the village elders, that the temple was renovated 250–300 years back by a Deekshidar whose Samadhi is located between the Kulam (pond) and the temple. In Thiruvannamalai in early 1990s, Sri Yogi Ram Suratkumar said that there was a Samadhi of a Sadhu located in the village. Sri Ramalingam of SBI tried locating this Samadhi after spending couple of years, he was stopped by Yogi saying that this task has been assigned by the almighty for somebody else.

There are also printed reports from Kalyana Kalpatharu (edition 1945), published from Varanasi, stating that Sri Venkatrama Iyer, belonging to this village, was the first to spread Panduranga Nama in South India. (TP Kodandarama) . From hearsay, Goddess Meenakshi is known for miracles and we have even witnessed some of them. Papanasam Sivan, the great Tamil composer is said to have got special powers after seeing Meenakshi.

The fact that Maha Periyava has visited this temple twice during his Vijay Yathras and has stayed here is a testimony to the piousness of the temple.

What's special about Sri Meenakshi Sundareswarar Temple? Goddess ‘Meenakshi’ is widely revered as a benevolent deity who bestows boons upon her devotees. The temple is very special as far as the Sthala, Moorthi and Theertham are concerned. It is a prominent Manokarakha Sthalam. (Manokaraka also means ‘Ruler of the Mind’) Worshipping this deity will wipe away all agony, problems and diseases of the mind. The deity would also vanquish fears, hatred, sorrow and anxiety; and bestow the devotee with a tranquil mind. Many Yogis, Gnanis and Siddha Purushas have benefitted from worshipping Perumal and Ammai. Amongst them, is the well-known Sri Rama Nama Yatheendral, who recited the Rama Nama with utmost devoutness, attained Siddhi in the Sannadhi and has performed exceptional miracles. Sri Rama Nama Yatheendral’s Athistanam is situated at this very place. (Adhishtanam is the sub-stratum. In Advaita Vedanta, the real entity located in which the unreal thing is perceived).
