= Vennavasal =

Coordinates: 10°45′54″N 79°29′10″E

Vennavasal is a village located in the Koradacheri block of the Thiruvarur District on the banks of Vennaaru river in the south Indian state of Tamil Nadu.
