= Karuvakkurichi =

Karuvakuruchi
- Village
- Nickname: karuvai
- Location in Tamil Nadu, India Karuvakuruchi (India)
- Coordinates: 10°35′37.4″N 79°22′32.3″E
- Country: India
- State: Tamil Nadu
- District: Tiruvarur
- Block: Needamangalam taluk
- Taluk: Mannargudi

Population (2001)
  - Total: 5,000

Languages
  - Official: Tamil
- Time zone: UTC+5:30 (IST)
- PIN: 614018
- Telephone code: 04367
- Vehicle registration: TN-50
- Coastline: 78 kilometres (48 mi)
- Nearest city: Thanjavur
- Literacy: 90%
- Lok Sabha constituency: Thanjavur
- Rajya sabha constituency: Mannargudi
- Climate: 15 - 38 (Köppen)
- Avg. summer temperature: 38 °C (100 °F)
- Avg. winter temperature: 20 °C (68 °F)

Karuvakkurichi is a village in Mannargudi Taluk of Thiruvarur district, Tamil Nadu, India. It is surrounded by agricultural lands, Rivers and Ponds. Karuvakkurichi consist of streets like First street, North street, West street, South street, Middle street, East street, Muzhiyan street, MGR Nagar, Perumal kovil street and Pillaiyar kovil street etc. The streets are elegantly arranged in such a manner that all the streets end at the main road of the village. There are many temples around village and particularly the Varatharaja Perumal temple is approximately 800 year old. The nearby town is Mannargudi in northeast and Orathanadu in the northwest.

There are 1 government higher secondary school and 1 Elementary school (Tamil) and 1 English medium school, Thirumurugan Nursery And Primary school.

Additionally, 1 government middle school is located in Karuvakkurichi Colony

There's 1 ATM centre is located in middle of the village, beside the Savadi.

More than 5000 people live in this village, with 95% of them belonging to Kallar (Mukkulathor) community such as Kandiyar, Onthiriyar, Thondaiman, Malusuthiyar etc... Paraiyar Konar and some other communities are also living there. The village is home to the Ayyanar Temple, Perumal Temple, and Pillayar Temple. It has produced distinguished individuals, including IPS and IFS officers, Elementary school teachers, as well as a notable number of PhD holders. Agriculture is the primary occupation of the residents, while a significant portion of the village's income comes from Singapore, where nearly every household has at least one family member residing.
