= R. Kamaraju =

Indian Tamil academic

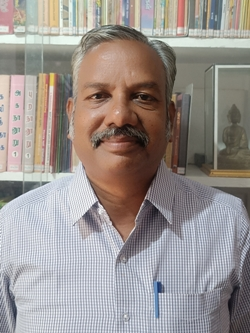
R.Kamaraju

R. Kamaraju (born 21 March 1970 in Melavasal at Mannargudi taluk, Tiruvarur district, Tamil Nadu) is an Indian Tamil academic.

== Education and position ==
He gained his B.A., M.A., and B.Ed. degrees from the University of Madras, his M.Phil. degree from Periyar University and his Ph.D. degree from Tamil University. He started his career as a school teacher in 1998.

After working in the Literature Department, he works in the Department of Folklore and is the Head of department. His areas of specialization are Modern Literature, Folklore and Literary Criticism. He is a creative writer and orator.

== Books ==
He has published nearly forty books, including short story compilations, textbooks, literary critical works, and novellas. Nearly seventy M.Phil. students and 20 Ph.D. students completed their research under his guidance. He published nearly 160 research articles. He also edited books.

== Foreign visits and awards ==
He went to France, Germany, Malaysia, Myanmar, Thailand and Mauritius for academic purposes. He participated in many seminars there and imparted Tamil language teaching. He received awards from Tirupur Tamizh Sangam, the State Bank of India, and Neyveli Books Exhibition Literature Award.
