= Adambar-I =

Adambar-I Athambar
- village
- Location in Tamil Nadu, India Adambar-I (India)
- Coordinates: 10.91138°N 79.573928°E
- Country: India
- State: Tamil Nadu
- District: Tiruvarur
- Named for: Athambar

Population (2001)
  - Total: 1,609

Languages
  - Official: Tamil
- Time zone: UTC+5:30 (IST)
- Postal code: 610105

Adambar is a village in the Nannilam taluk of Tiruvarur district in the Indian state of Tamil Nadu.

== Demographics ==
As per the 2001 census, Adambar OR Athambar had a population of 1,609 with 824 males and 785 females. The sex ratio was 953. The literacy rate was 80.74.

== Geography ==
The village is surrounded by greenery. This village is around 22 km from Tiruvarur and 8 km from Nannilam.

== Culture ==
Adambar Shri Kothandaramar temple and a 13th-century Shiva temple are located in the village. It has historical connection with the Ramayana. Rama vowed to kill Atham the magic deer there, which Sita devi wanted. Kothandaramar Temple is the temple of Sri Ranganathar.

Other temples include Sri Siddhi Vinayaga Temple, Shri Kothandaramar Temple, Lord Siva Temple, Maha Mariamman Temple, and Pidari Amman Temple.

== Transport ==
Buses travel to Nannilam from Tiruvarur.
