= Annavasal =

Annavasal may refer to:

- Annavasal, Pudukkottai, a town in Pudukkottai district in Tamil Nadu, India
  - Annavasal block, in the Pudukkottai district
- Annavasal, Tiruvarur, a town in Tiruvarur district in Tamil Nadu, India
