= Sarguna Nathar Temple =

Religion
- Affiliation: Hinduism
- District: Tiruvarur
- Deity: Lord Shiva

Location
- Location: Idumbavanam in the Thiruthiraipoondi taluk
- State: Tamil Nadu
- Country: India

Sarguna Nathar Temple (சற்குணநாதர் கோயில்) is a Hindu temple located in the village of Idumbavanam in the Thiruthiraipoondi taluk of Tiruvarur district in Tamil Nadu, India. Dedicated to Shiva, Idumbavanam is believed to be the place where Yama, the god of death worshipped Shiva in order to rid himself of the sin of trespassing him and tried to take Markandeya to the netherworld.

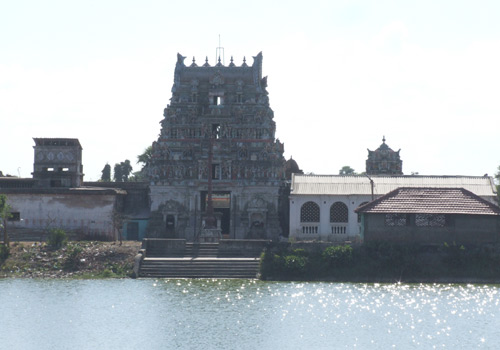

== Significance ==
It is one of the shrines of the 275 Paadal Petra Sthalams. Hymns in praise of the temple have been sung by the Saivite saint Sambandar in the Thevaram. The temple is frequented by people desiring to rid themselves of the fear of death. The place is believed to have got its name from a demon named Idumban who worshipped Shiva here and attained salvation.

== Shrines ==
There are shrines to Vinayaka, Murugan, Bhairava, Surya, Chandra, Shani and Durga.
