= Semmangudi =

- village
- Location within Tamil Nadu Location within India
- Coordinates: 10.834823°N 79.554362°E
- Country: India
- State: Tamil Nadu
- District: Tiruvarur
- Taluka: Kodavasal

Population (2001)
  - Total: 1,440

Languages
  - Official: Tamil
- Time zone: UTC+5:30 (IST)
- PIN: 612603
- Telephone code: 04366

Semmangudi or sembangudi is a village in Thiruvarur taluk, Thiruvarur district, Tamil Nadu. It is the home of many carnatic singers. The popular carnatic singer Semmangudi Srinivasa Iyer, is from this town.pin code:612603

== Demographics ==
As per the 2001 census, Semmangudi had a population of 1440 with 774 males and 716 females. The sex ratio was 989 and the literacy rate, 70.89.
