= Anaikuppam =

- village
- Country: India
- State: Tamil Nadu
- District: Tiruvarur

Population (2001)
  - Total: 3,014

Languages
  - Official: Tamil
- Time zone: UTC+5:30 (IST)

Anaikuppam is a village in the Nannilam taluk of Tiruvarur district in Tamil Nadu, India.

== Demographics ==
As per the 2001 census, Anaikuppam had a population of 3,014 with 1,503 males and 1,511 females. The sex ratio was 1005. The literacy rate was 72.19.
