= Kudavasal block =

Revenue block in Tiruvarur district, Tamil Nadu, India

Coordinates: 10°52′20″N 79°29′09″E

Kudavasal block is a revenue block in the Kudavasal taluk of Tiruvarur district, Tamil Nadu, India. It has a total of 49 panchayat villages.
