= Melamaravakkadu =

Village in Tamil Nadu, India

Coordinates: 10.632°N 79.456°E

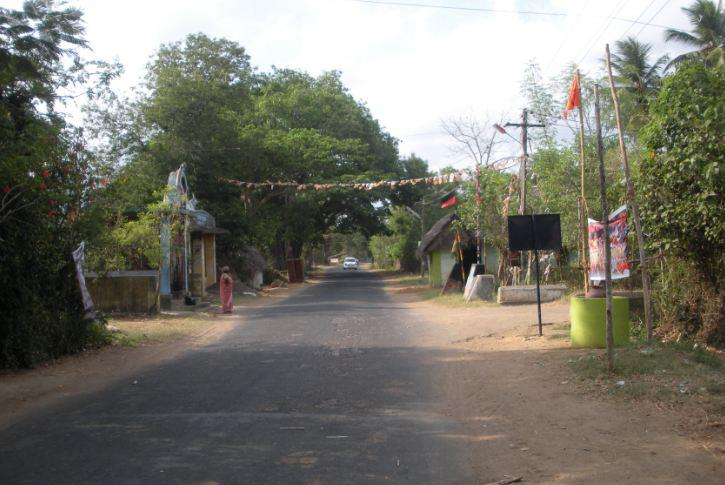

Melamaravakkadu is a village in Thiruvarur district in Tamil Nadu, India.

The village is located between Mannargudi and Thirumakkottai. It is 304 km (191 mi) from Chennai, and 28 km (17 mi) from Tiruvarur.

== Government ==
Melamaravakkadu is administered by an Asesham panchayath. As of 2011, the panchayath covered an area of 11.55 km2 (4.46 sq mi) and had a population of 3,796. Melamaravakkadu comes under the Mannargudi assembly constituency which elects a member to the Tamil Nadu Legislative Assembly once every five years, and also part of the Thanjavur constituency which elects a Member of Parliament (MP) every five years.

== Etymology ==
The word ‘’Maravakkadu’’ derives from the Tamil words "Marakkamudiyatha kaadu",("Unforgettable forest"). In early days this village might have been filled with forest. The word Mela refers to "West". The village is located on the west side of the Paamani river. The village is locally referred as "Maravai". youngsters from this village call himself by "maravakkattan"

== Geography ==
It is situated at an average elevation of 6 m (20 ft) on the banks of the Pamaniyar River, a tributary of the Vettar, and is covered with fertile soil conducive to rice cultivation. The topography is completely flat and the town is a part of the fertile Cauvery River delta.

== Economy ==
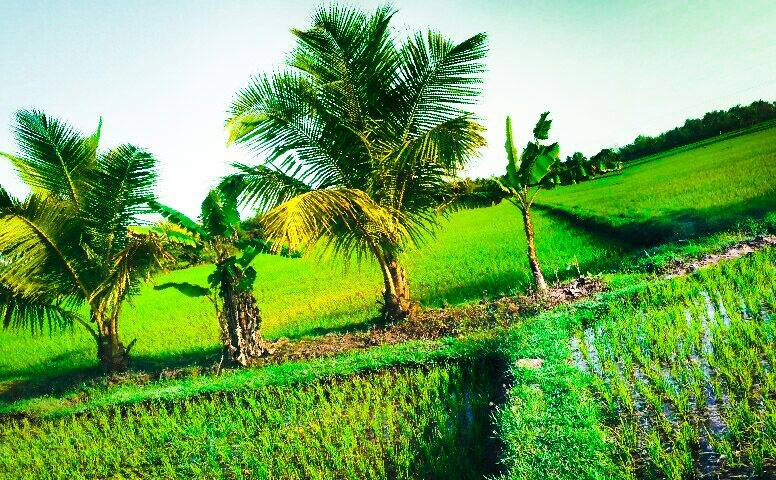

Agriculture is the principal occupation of the people of Melamaravakkadu and its crops include paddy, sugarcane, sesame, groundnut and pulses like urad and mung bean. The agriculture of the village depends on the river Pamaniyar; other sources of irrigation include bore-wells.

== People and culture ==
Melamaravakkadu has three prominent Hindu temples:

- Sri Vinayagar temple,
- Sri Mangala mariyamman temple and
- Sri Veeramanavaala swamy temple.

During the Tamil months of Vaikashi (May–June), the most prominent festival of the Sri Mangalamariyamman temple, Vaikaasi Thiruvizha, is celebrated for five days.

The village has two schools:

- Tamil Nadu government public panchyat elementary school, inaugurated in 1965.
- Devi Higher secondary school which privately run for the last 10 years.

According to the 2011 census, Melamaravakkadu had a population of 865 with a gender-ratio of 423 females for every 442 males, much more than the national average of 92.9. Over 90 percentage of the people are literate, higher than the national average. As of 2012, a total 1.14 km2 (281 acres) (24.38%) of the land was residential, and 0.72 km2 (177.03 acres) (63%) agricultural.
