= Kappanamangalam =

Coordinates: 10°50′N 79°32′E

- village
- Interactive map of Kappanamangalam
- Country: India
- State: Tamil Nadu
- District: Tiruvarur

Population (2001)
  - Total: 1,659

Languages
  - Official: Tamil
- Time zone: UTC+5:30 (IST)

Kappanamangalam is a village in the Kudavasal taluk of Tiruvarur district in Tamil Nadu, India.

== Demographics ==
As per the 2001 census, Kappanamangalam had a population of 1,777 with 902 males and 875 females. The sex ratio was 970. The literacy rate was 75.18.
