= Agarathirumalam =

- village
- Location in Tamil Nadu, India
- Coordinates: 10.932278°N 79.669857°E
- Country: India
- State: Tamil Nadu
- District: Tiruvarur

Government
  - Panchayat President: nr rajasekRan

Population (2001)
  - Total: 4,177

Languages
  - Official: Tamil
- Time zone: UTC+5:30 (IST)
- Postal code: 609503
- Vehicle registration: TN 50

Agarathirumalam is a village in the Nannilam taluk of Tiruvarur district in Tamil Nadu, India.

== Demographics ==
As per the 2001 census, Agarathirumalam had a population of 4,177 with 2,056 males and 2,121 females. The sex ratio was 1032. The literacy rate was 88.63.there is 5 hamlet 1.poonthottam 2.viravadi 3.agarathirumalam 4.varakur 5.mottathur Also poonthottam is big hamlet near by koothanur saraswathi amman and adhivinayagar sethalapathi also world famous temple Poonthottam schools govt hr sec school, Govt primary school, Saraswthi vidyalaya school and lalidhambigai matriculation hr sec school
