= Tirupperuvelur Abhimuktheeswarar Temple =

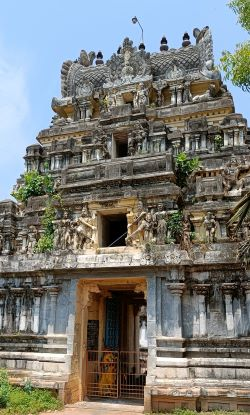

Religion
- Affiliation: Hinduism
- District: Tiruvarur
- Deity: Lord (Shiva),

Location
- Location: Manakkal ayyempet in Tiruvarur district
- State: Tamil Nadu
- Country: India

Tirupperuvelur Abhimuktheeswarar Temple (Tamil: மணக்கால் ஐயன்பேட்டை அபிமுகேசுவரர் கோயில்) is a Hindu temple located at Manakkal ayyempet in Tiruvarur district, Tamil Nadu, India. The temple is dedicated to Shiva, as the moolavar presiding deity, in his manifestation as Avimuktheswarar. His consort, Parvati, is known as Baagampriyal. The place is also known as Tirupperuvelur.

== Significance ==
It is one of the shrines of the 275 Paadal Petra Sthalams - Shiva Sthalams glorified in the early medieval Tevaram poems by Tamil Saivite Nayanars Tirugnanasambandar and Tirunavukkarasar.

== Literary mention ==
Tirugnanasambandar describes the feature of the deity as:

விழையாதார் விழைவார்போல் விகிர்தங்கள் பலபேசிக்

குழையாதார் குழைவார்போற் குணம்நல்ல பலகூறி
அழையாவு மரற்றாவு மடிவீழ்வார் தமக்கென்றும்

பிழையாத பெருமானார் பெருவேளூர் பிரியாரே.

== Photogallery ==
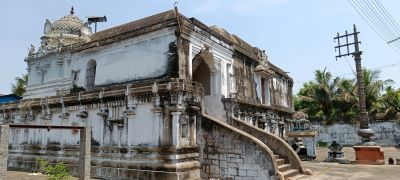
Front mandapa

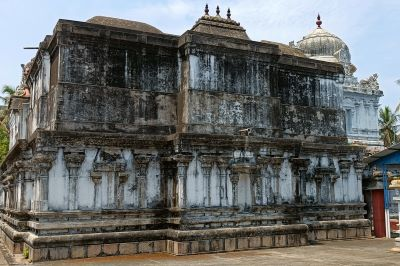
Prakara

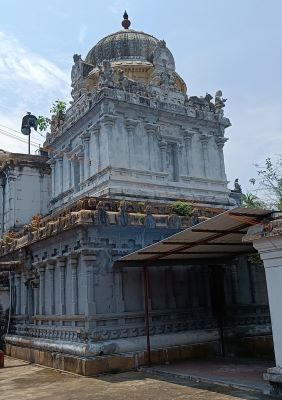
Vimana of the presiding deity

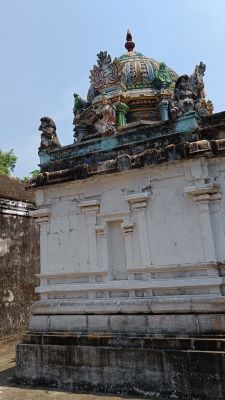
Vimana of the Goddess
