= Thediyur =

Thediyur Tediyur
- village
- Country: India
- State: Tamil Nadu
- District: Tiruvarur

Languages
  - Official: Tamil
- Time zone: UTC+5:30 (IST)
- Vehicle registration: TN-

Thediyur (also spelled Tediyur or Thethiyur) is a village in Kudavasal taluk, Tiruvarur district, Tamil Nadu, India.

It is one of the eighteen villages where vAthimALs settled. Located 23 km from Kumbakonam, it has a population of about 3000 people. The village is well connected by road to Kumbakonam and Mayiladuthurai. Bus services are available every 30 minutes from Kumbakonam and Mayiladuthurai.
