= Agaravelukudi =

- village
- Location in Tamil Nadu, India
- Coordinates: 10.71549°N 79.556129°E
- Country: India
- State: Tamil Nadu
- District: Tiruvarur

Population (2001)
  - Total: 1,223

Languages
  - Official: Tamil
- Time zone: UTC+5:30 (IST)

Agaravelukudi is a village in the Needamangalam taluk of Tiruvarur district in Tamil Nadu, India.

== Demographics ==
As per the 2001 census, Agaravelukudi had a population of 1,223 with 618 males and 605 females. The sex ratio was 979. The literacy rate was 71.68.
