= Pillur =

Coordinates: 12°26′N 79°06′E

- village
- Interactive map of Pillur
- Country: India
- State: Tamil Nadu
- District: Thiruvarur district

Languages
  - Official: Tamil
- Time zone: UTC+5:30 (IST)
- Vehicle registration: TN-

Pillur is a village in Tiruvarur district, Tamil Nadu, India. It is part of Nannilam taluk. It has a population of about 2,500.

== History ==
People believe that the village got its name after a visit by Lord Siva and Parvathi. This village has many historical temples, including Jayambal Sametha Jayenkondeshwarar Swamy Temple and Sri Poorna Pushkalambal Sametha Hari Hara Puthra Swami and temple.

== Village structure ==
It has four main streets: Agraharam, Keelanathem, Nadunathem and Melnathem. All the streets are independent in street related issues (like welfare, committee, etc.)

== Demographics and economy ==
Agriculture is the main business and source of income for the people. The people are well educated. Most of the families are involved in agriculture and cattle also some people are doing IT related business and some are software developers, also cinema industry like directors, producers, actors. More than 10 are in Indian military agribusiness.
