= Arpar =

- village
- Country: India
- State: Tamil Nadu
- District: Tiruvarur

Population (2001)
  - Total: 835

Languages
  - Official: Tamil
- Time zone: UTC+5:30 (IST)

Arpar is a village in the Kudavasal taluk of Tiruvarur district in Tamil Nadu, India.

It is the village of delta region. Mostly the people's occupation is farming. Greeny area with full of natural things, wonders. There is an aiyanar temple in the entrance, a Gangana Mariamman temple in the interior, near the Mariamman temple there is a Pillaiyar temple and the famous Yemathandisvarar Lord Siva temple is located there.

== Demographics ==
As per the 2001 census, Arpar had a population of 835 with 441 males and 394 females. The sex ratio was 893. The literacy rate was 77.28.
