= Alivalam =

Alivalam Arivalam
- village
- Location in Tamil Nadu, India Alivalam (India)
- Coordinates: 10.7496329°N 79.6340484°E
- Country: India
- State: Tamil Nadu
- District: Tiruvarur

Government
  - Panchayat President: Nirmala Pandian

Population (2011)
  - Total: 5,785

Languages
  - Official: Tamil
- Time zone: UTC+5:30 (IST)
- Postal code: 610106
- Vehicle registration: TN 50

Alivalam is a village in the Tiruvarur taluk of Tiruvarur district, Tamil Nadu, India. Formerly this village was called 'Arivalam'.

== Demographics ==
As of the 2011 Census of India, the total population of the village is 5,785 with 2,896 males 2,889 females.
