= Ullikkottai =

Coordinates: 10°36′N 79°25′E

Ullikkottai is a village in Mannargudi Taluk, Tiruvarur District, Tamil Nadu, India. It lies between Mannargudi and Pattukkottai on State Highway 146. The former is 8 kilometres (5.0 mi) distant and the latter is 15 kilometres (9.3 mi) away.

The village name derives from Ulle Kottai (a great wall) which was built around the palace.

The nearest railway station is at Mannargudi.

The Government Hospital in Ullikkottai also serves the surrounding villages.

The main temples are Lord Shiva, Kulanthai Mari Amman Kovil, Varada Raja Perumal Kovil.

The village has three Government Schools - two primary schools and a higher secondary school - and also a Matriculation School.

== Demographics ==
As of 2011, Ullikottai had a population of 5,260 of which 2,683 were males while 2,577 were females.

The population of children in the age group 0-6 was 461 which made up 8.76% of total population of village. Average Sex Ratio of Ullikottai village was 960. The literacy rate of Ullikottai -I village was 82.58% compared to 80.09% of Tamil Nadu. Male literacy stood at 89.10% while female literacy rate was 75.89%.
