= Adippuliyur =

- village
- Location in Tamil Nadu, India
- Coordinates: 10.876187°N 79.495697°E
- Country: India
- State: Tamil Nadu
- District: Tiruvarur

Population (2001)
  - Total: 1,182

Languages
  - Official: Tamil
- Time zone: UTC+5:30 (IST)

Adippuliyur is a village in the Kudavasal taluk of Tiruvarur district, Tamil Nadu, India.

== Demographics ==
As per the 2001 census, Adippuliyur had a total population of 1182 with 590 males and 592 females. The sex ratio was 1003. The literacy rate was 71.89.
