= Athikottai =

தன்னரசுநாடு Athikottai
- Village
- Location in Tamil Nadu, India தன்னரசுநாடு Athikottai (India)
- Coordinates: 10°37′58.6″N 79°24′26.7″E
- Country: India
- State: Tamil Nadu
- District: Tiruvarur
- Taluk: Mannargudi

Population (2001)
  - Total: 1,100

Languages
  - Official: Tamil
- Time zone: UTC+5:30 (IST)
- PIN: 614014
- Telephone code: 04367
- Vehicle registration: TN-50
- Coastline: 75 kilometres (47 mi)
- Nearest city: Tiruchirappalli (Region)
- Literacy: 90%
- Lok Sabha constituency: Thanjavur
- Climate: 15 - 38 (Köppen)
- Avg. summer temperature: 38 °C (100 °F)
- Avg. winter temperature: 20 °C (68 °F)

Athikkottai is a village in the Mannargudi taluk of Tiruvarur district in Tamil Nadu, India. The main activities of this village is Agriculture.

== Demographics ==
As per the 2001 census, Athikkottai had a population of 1,110 with 555 males and 555 females. The sex ratio was 1000. The literacy rate was 75.91%.
