= Anaivadapathi =

- village
- Interactive map of Anaivadapathi
- Coordinates: 10.777009°N 79.5762938°E
- Country: India
- State: Tamil Nadu
- District: Tiruvarur

Population (2001)
  - Total: 1,911

Languages
  - Official: Tamil
- Time zone: UTC+5:30 (IST)

Anaivadapathi is a village in the Kudavasal taluk of Tiruvarur district, Tamil Nadu, India.

== Demographics ==
As per the 2001 census, Anaivadapathi had a total population of 1911 with 984 males and 927 females. The sex ratio was 942. The literacy rate was 73.03.
