= Ayyampettai, Tiruvarur =

Ayyampettai
- village
- Location in Tamil Nadu, India
- Coordinates: 10°49′10″N 79°34′32″E
- Country: India
- State: Tamil Nadu
- District: Tiruvarur
- Taluka: Tiruvarur
- Block: Koradacheri

Area
  - Total: 4.64 km^{2} (1.79 sq mi)
- Elevation: 21 m (69 ft)

Population (2011)
  - Total: 3,546
  - Density: 764/km^{2} (1,980/sq mi)

Languages
  - Official: Tamil
- Time zone: UTC+5:30 (IST)
- PIN: 610 104
- Area code: 04366
- Vehicle registration: TN 50

Ayyampettai is a village in the Tiruvarur taluk of Tiruvarur district in Tamil Nadu, India.

== Demographic ==
As of 2011 census, Ayyampettai had a population of 3546 with 1784 males and 1762 females. The sex ratio was 987. The literacy rate was 81.34.

== Temples ==
Abimuktheswarar temple

Seshapuishvarar
