= Keerangudi =

- village
- Country: India
- State: Tamil Nadu
- District: Tiruvarur

Population (2001)
  - Total: 1,181

Languages
  - Official: Tamil
- Time zone: UTC+5:30 (IST)

Keerangudi is a village in the Tiruvarur taluk of Tiruvarur district in Tamil Nadu, India.

== Demographics ==
As per the 2001 census, Keerangudi had a population of 1,520 with 744 males and 776 females. The sex ratio was 1043. The literacy rate was 73.52.
