= Saliperi =

- village
- Location in Tamil Nadu, India Saliperi (India)
- Coordinates: 10.87°N 79.61°E
- Country: India
- State: Tamil Nadu
- District: Thiruvarur

Languages
  - Official: Tamil
- Time zone: UTC+5:30 (IST)
- PIN: 610105
- Telephone code: 04366
- Vehicle registration: TN-51

Saliperi is a village in the Thiruvarur district of Tamil Nadu, India. It lies between the banks of the river Puthar and Valapar (both branch rivers of the Kaveri). This village is just 3 km (1.9 mi) from Thiruvaanchiyam /Srivanchiyam (a padal petra Sivaalayam of Vanchinathaswamy).

== Overview ==
It covers more than 300 acres (120 ha) of cultivable land in the core Kaveri delta region. The cultivable lands are irrigated through both Puthar and Valapar rivers. This village has about 7+ ponds and a lake. Of late, this lake becoming a sanctuary for migrating birds in the seasons.

This village has about seven temples and most significant temples are Sivan Temple, Shree Maha Mariamman Temple, Shree Angalamman Temple, & Perumaal Temple. In fact, name of the village is called after Raman spent a whole night here after faintly searching for Seetha (Lord Rama Salipu Aariya Iddam "SALIPERI").

== Agriculture ==
Agriculture is the predominant occupation of the people of this village. This village have been irrigated by the rivers Puthaar & Valapaar.

=== Model scheme (village) ===
Under the guidance and association with IMTI (Irrigation Management Training Institute), implemented an irrigation management project to maintain the irrigation canals & ponds in an ongoing basis. As a result, Mahilancheri Channel Saliperi Village Water Users' Association was formed on 10 June 1989. A one time corpus had been formed by collecting an amount based on the land owned (Rs.250.00 per hectare) by the farmers. An equivalent(matching) amount of money collected from the farmers had been sanctioned by IMTI and added to the corpuses.

Subsequently, this scheme become a model scheme, called "Salipperi Model". The villages which follow Salipperi Model are sanctioned with the grant when the corpus is formed.

=== Main crops ===
Rice grown in paddies is the main crop of the region. Other crops, including Cotton, Sugarcane, Sunflower, etc. have also been tried in lesser area.

== Facilities ==
This small village has a Government aided Tamil medium primary school. It doesn't have a primary health centre and the nearest health facilities available is in the nearby town Nannilam.

== Nearby town ==
Nannilam is a nearby town and Taluk headquarters in Tiruvarur District. Nannilam is a state legislative assembly constituency and part of Nagapatinam parliament constituency.

== Reachability ==
Saliperi is reachable mainly through Nannilam by road, which is about 28 km east of Kumbakonam, 28 km south of Mayiladuthurai, 35 km West of Nagapatinam and 15 km north of district headquarters Tiruvarur. All the above-mentioned 4 towns are connected through rail to Chennai, Bangalore, Rameswaram, Trichirapalli, Coimbatore, etc.

The nearest airport is in Trichirapalli, which operates international routes to Malaysia and the Middle East.
