= Aladikaruppur =

- village
- Interactive map of Aladikaruppur
- Coordinates: 10.856148°N 79.452166°E
- Country: India
- State: Tamil Nadu
- District: Tiruvarur

Population (2001)
  - Total: 1,290

Languages
  - Official: Tamil
- Time zone: UTC+5:30 (IST)

Aladikaruppur is a village in the Kudavasal taluk of Tiruvarur district, Tamil Nadu, India.

== Demographics ==
As per the 2001 census, Aladikaruppur had a total population of 1290 with 647 males and 643 females. The sex ratio was 994. The literacy rate was 62.15.
