= Nedumbalam =

- village
- Location in Tamil Nadu, India Nedumbalam (India)
- Coordinates: 10.52°N 79.63°E
- Country: India
- State: Tamil Nadu
- District: Thiruvarur

Languages
  - Official: Tamil
- Time zone: UTC+5:30 (IST)

Nedumbalam is a village in Thiruvarur district of Tamil Nadu, India. It is located in the Needamangalam taluk of Thiruvarur district.
