= Adhanur, Tiruvarur =

Adhanur
- village
- Interactive map of Adhanur
- Coordinates: 10.766593°N 79.38316°E
- Country: India
- State: Tamil Nadu
- District: Tiruvarur

Population (2001)
  - Total: 2,777

Languages
  - Official: Tamil
- Time zone: UTC+5:30 (IST)

Adhanur is a village in the Needamangalam taluk of Tiruvarur district in Tamil Nadu, India.

== Demographics ==
As of 2001 census, Adhanur had a population of 2,777 with 1,466 males and 1,311 females. The sex ratio was 894. The literacy rate was 77.73.
