= Karaiyappalaiyur =

- village
- Country: India
- State: Tamil Nadu
- District: Tiruvarur

Population (2001)
  - Total: 1,181

Languages
  - Official: Tamil
- Time zone: UTC+5:30 (IST)

Karaiyappalaiyur is a village in the Kudavasal taluk of Tiruvarur district in Tamil Nadu, India.

== Demographics ==
As per the 2001 census, Kappanamangalam had a population of 1,181 with 617 males and 564 females. The sex ratio was 914. The literacy rate was 70.74.
