= Athicholamangalam =

- village
- Country: India
- State: Tamil Nadu
- District: Tiruvarur

Population (2001)
  - Total: 925

Languages
  - Official: Tamil
- Time zone: UTC+5:30 (IST)

Athicholamangalam is a village in the Kudavasal taluk of Tiruvarur district in Tamil Nadu, India.

== Demographics ==
As per the 2001 census, Athicholamangalam had a population of 925 with 470 males and 455 females. The sex ratio was 968. The literacy rate was 40.38.
