= Kadalangudi =

- village
- Location in Tamil Nadu, India
- Coordinates: 10.932471°N 79.512566°E
- Country: India
- State: Tamil Nadu
- District: Tiruvarur

Population (2001)
  - Total: 1,305

Languages
  - Official: Tamil
- Time zone: UTC+5:30 (IST)

Kadalangudi is a village in the Kudavasal taluk of Tiruvarur district in Tamil Nadu, India.

== Demographics ==
As per the 2011 census, Kadalangudi had a population of 1,406 with 724 males and 682 females. The sex ratio was 942. The literacy rate was 80.8.
