= Akkarai Kottagam =

Neighbourhood in Tiruvarur district, Tamil Nadu, India

- Village
- Akkarai Kottagam, Tiruvarur district, Tamil Nadu
- Coordinates: 10.5612°N 79.5519°E
- Country: India
- State: Tamil Nadu
- District: Tiruvarur
- Elevation: 29.32 m (96.2 ft)

Population (2001)
  - Total: 1,943

Languages
  - Official: Tamil
- Time zone: UTC+5:30 (IST)

Akkarai Kottagam is a village in the Mannargudi taluk of Tiruvarur district in Tamil Nadu, India.

== Demographics ==
As per the 2001 census, Akkarai Kottagam had a population of 1,943 with 943 males and 1,000 females. The sex ratio was 1060. The literacy rate was 69.53.
