= Kamalapuram, Tiruvarur =

Kamalapuram
- village
- Location in Tamil Nadu, India
- Coordinates: 10.750862°N 79.574392°E
- Country: India
- State: Tamil Nadu
- District: Tiruvarur

Population (2001)
  - Total: 1,274

Languages
  - Official: Tamil
- Time zone: UTC+5:30 (IST)

Kamalapuram is a village in the Kudavasal taluk of Tiruvarur district in Tamil Nadu, India.

== Demographics ==
As of 2001 census, Kamalapuram had a population of 1,274 with 652 males and 622 females. The sex ratio was 954. The literacy rate was 70.77.
