= Elangarkudi =

Village in Tamil Nadu, India

Coordinates: 10.78876°N 79.512305°E

Elangarkudi is a village near Koradacheri in Tiruvarur district, Tamil Nadu.

There are two temples in the village. One of the temples is Kailasanadhar temple and Maariamman and Kaliamman temple. The Kailasanadhar temple was constructed by Cholas during the Chola period. Elangarkudi is located along the Pandavas river. There was a big house in the village called Aranmanai house near Aranmanai Kulam (tank). The people travel from Thanjavur (capital of cholas) Thiravarur. It has agriculture and dairy products. It is situated near the Navagraha stalam. The village is without pollution. The village can be entered through Nallil Ondru. The place is rich in fruits and vegetables.
