= Munnavalkottai =

- Village
- Nickname: munnai
- Location in Tamil Nadu, India
- Coordinates: 10.756866°N 79.370650°E
- Country: India
- State: Tamil Nadu
- District: Thiruvarur
- Taluka: Needamangalam
- Elevation: 28 m (92 ft)

Population (2011)
  - Total: 947

Languages
  - Official: Tamil
- Time zone: UTC+5:30 (IST)
- PIN: 614403
- Telephone code: 04367
- Vehicle registration: TN-50

Munnavalkottai is a village in the Needamangalam taluk of Thiruvarur district in the Indian state of Tamil Nadu.

== Geography ==
Munnavalkottai has an elevation of 28 m (92 ft). It is situated about 7 Kilometers West of Needamangalam, 19 Kilometers North of Mannargudi, 31 Kilometers South of Kumbakonam, 31 Kilometers East of Thanjavur and 36 Kilometers West of Tiruvarur. Munnavalkottai is in the border of the Thiruvarur District and Thanjavur District and has a Branch Post office with Sub Post office in Kovilvenni. Munnavalkottai is surrounded by Koradacherry Taluk towards East, Ammapettai Taluk towards west, Kodavasal Taluk towards North, Mannargudi Taluk towards South.

== Demographics ==
In the 2011 India census, Munnavalkottai had a population of 947. Males constituted 48% of the population and females 52%. Munnavalkottai had an average literacy rate of 72%: male literacy was 79%, and female literacy was 65%. In 2011 in Munnavalkottai, 10% of the population was under 6 years of age.

== Schools ==
- Government Higher Secondary School, Munnavalkottai
- Government Elementary School, Munnavalkottai

== Temples ==
- Kalahastheeswarar temple located right at the North gate of the Village.
- Olaikonda Ayyanar temple

== Politics ==
Munnavalkottai belongs to Mannargudi (State Assembly Constituency) is part of Thanjavur (Lok Sabha constituency).
