= Thiruthiraipoondi taluk =

Thiruthuraipoondi taluk is a taluk in Thiruvarur district of the Indian state of Tamil Nadu. The headquarters of the taluk is the town of Thiruthuraipoondi.

== Demographics ==
According to the 2011 census, the taluk of Thiruthuraipoondi had a population of 217,104 with 106,433 males and 110,671 females. There were 1040 women for every 1000 men. The taluk had a literacy rate of 75.14. Child population in the age group below 6 was 9,817 Males and 9,612 Females.

== Villages ==
The following is complete list of villages in Thiruthiraipoondi taluk:

1 Adirangam

2 Alangadu Muthupet

3 Alathambadi

4 Alivalam

5 Ammanur

6 Andankarai

7 Ariyalur

8 Athanur

9 Chettiyamoolai

10 Deevambalpuram

11 Desingurajapuram

12 Edaiyur

13 Ekkal

14 Ezhilur

15 Idumbavanam

16 Jambuvanodai Muthupet

17.Kaduvakothamangalam

18 Kallikudi

19 Kaluvangadu

20.Karpaganathar kulam

21 Katchanam

22 Kattimedu

23 Keelanammankurichi Muthupet

24 Keelaperumazhai

25 Keerakkalur

26 Keeralathur

27 Keezhapandi

28 Kokkalady

29 Komal

30 Korukkai

31 Kothamangalam

32 Kunnalur

33 Kunnur

34 Kurumbal

35 Manali

36 Mangal Muthupet

37 Mangudi

38 Maruthavanam

39 Melamarathur

40 Melanammankurichi Muthupet

41 Melaperumazhai

42 Mettupalayamm

43 Muthupet

44 Nedumbalam

45 Nunakkadu

46 Ovarur

47 Palayangudi

48 Pamani

49 Panaiyur

50 Pandi

51 Pichankottagam

52 Pinnathur

53 Poosalangudi

54 Rayanallur

55 Sanganthi

56 Sathangudi

57 Segal

58 Thillaivilagam

59 Thiruppattur

60 Thiruthangur

61 Thiruvalanjuli

62 Tholi

63 Thondiyakkadu

64 Thuraikkadu

65 Udayamarthandapuram

66 Uppur

67 Vadakadu

68 Vadasanganthi

69 Vanganagar

70 Veeranvayal

71 Velur

72 Vilakkudi

73 Vilangadu

74 Vilathur.
