= Vilvaranyeswarar Temple =

Shiva temple in Tamil Nadu, India

Religion
- Affiliation: Hinduism
- District: Tiruvarur
- Deity: Lord Shiva

Location
- Location: Tiruvarur district
- State: Tamil Nadu
- Country: India

Vilvaranyeswarar Temple is a Hindu temple located in the Tiruvarur district of Tamil Nadu, India. The temple is dedicated to Shiva.

== Location ==
The temple is located in the village of Thirukkollampudur. It is situated at a distance of 24 kilometres from Kumbakonam on the way to Koradacheri.

== Shrines ==
There are shrines to Ganesha, Murugan, Vishwanatha and Gajalakshmi within the temple complex. The sthala vriksha is vilva.

== Significance ==
Praises of the temple have been sung in the Thevaram hymns of Sambandar. According to epigraphical evidence, the temple is believed to have been constructed by Kulothunga Chola III or Raja Raja Chola III.
