= Adichapuram =

- village
- Location in Tamil Nadu, India
- Coordinates: 10.633003°N 79.540674°E
- Country: India
- State: Tamil Nadu
- District: Tiruvarur

Population (2001)
  - Total: 2,110

Languages
  - Official: Tamil
- Time zone: UTC+5:30 (IST)

Adichapuram is a village in the Mannargudi taluk of Tiruvarur district in Tamil Nadu, India.

== Demographics ==
As per the 2001 census, Adichapuram had a population of 2110 with 1,031 males and 1,079 females. The sex ratio was 1047. The literacy rate was 70
