= Athikkottai (Thiruvarur) =

Athikottai
- Village
- Location in Tamil Nadu, India Athikottai (India)
- Coordinates: 10°37′59.1″N 79°24′26.9″E
- Country: India
- State: Tamil Nadu
- District: Tiruvarur
- Taluk: Mannargudi

Population (2001)
  - Total: 1,100

Languages
  - Official: Tamil
- Time zone: UTC+5:30 (IST)
- PIN: 614018
- Telephone code: 04367
- Vehicle registration: TN-50
- Coastline: 75 kilometres (47 mi)
- Nearest city: Tiruchirappalli (Region)
- Literacy: 90%
- Lok Sabha constituency: Thanjavur
- Rajya Sabha constituency: Mannargudi
- Climate: 15 - 38 (Köppen)
- Avg. summer temperature: 38 °C (100 °F)
- Avg. winter temperature: 20 °C (68 °F)

Athikkottai is a village under Serumangalam Panchayats in Needamangalam Panchayats Union and Mannargudi Taluk, Tiruvarur District, Tamil Nadu, India. The main activities of this village is agriculture. Other villagers are working in Singapore and Malaysia. More than 1100 people live in this village, with 90% of them belonging to Kallar (Mukkulathor) community.
