= Rettakudi =

Village in Tamil Nadu, India

Rettakudi is a village in Nannilam taluk, Thiruvarur district, Tamil Nadu, India. It is located approximately 8 kilometres (5.0 mi) from Poonthottam in the Cauvery Delta.

== Etymology ==
Rettakudi derives its name from the legend of Lord Siva and Arjuna in the Mahabaratha: in a fit of anger, Arjuna struck the head of Siva and split it in two (retta meaning "two" in the Tamil language). The village is named in recognition of this legend. Today, one can see the head of the Sivalinga in broken form.

== Location and transportation ==
Rettakudi is located about 25 kilometres (16 mi) from both Mayiladuthurai and Thiruvarur, and about 10 kilometres (6.2 mi) from Tirunallar. The nearest railway station is in Poonthottam, about 8 kilometres (5.0 mi) distant, while bus transport is available from the nearby village of Ambal, 2 kilometres (1.2 mi) distant.

== Climate ==
The period from November to February in Rettakudi is marked by warm days and cool nights. The onset of summer is from March, with temperatures peaking by the end of May and June. Summer rains are sparse and the first monsoon, the South-West monsoon, sets in June and continues till September. North-East monsoon sets in October and continues till January. The rainfall during South-West monsoon period is much lower than that of North-East monsoon. The North-East monsoon is beneficial to the district at large because of the heavy rainfall and the Western ghats feeding the river Cauvery.

== Economy ==
The major occupation of the people in Rettakudi is agriculture.

== Religion ==
Rettakudi features a temple dedicated to Sastha, the deity worshipped by most of the village inhabitants. There are also temples dedicated to Ganesh, Shiva, Vishnu and Pidari Amman, the gramadevata (village deity) of Rettakudi. A wonderful srei veeranar temple is in the village. This temple is a private kuladevadha temple for particular peoples.

Annual festivals are conducted for two days during the month of May. During this festival many who have left Rettakudi for the cities return to celebrate together with their families.
