= Vadamattam =

Coordinates: 10.968157°N 79.536545°E

Vadamattam is a small agriculture-based village on the Keerthiman River in the Kudavasal taluk of Tiruvarur district, Tamil Nadu, India.

The village is located next to Konerirajapuram on Kumbakonam - Karikal road i.e. 23 km from Kumbakonam Town (Bus & Train Terminus). The village is accessible by road and frequent transportation services are available from Kumbakonam, Mayiladuthurai, Aduthurai and Thiruvarur; just some of the major towns with transportation. Konerirajapuram has a post office (PIN code 612201), commercial bank, and a historic palace.

The region was once ruled by Cholas, who constructed a large Siva temple there. The origin of Vadamattam is derived from vadam-muttum, the end of a thick string which is used to pull a big chariot over the river bridge of Keerthiman (Konerirajapuram) is the village of Vadamattam Panchayat' (administrative), which is in the Vayalur region.

In the heartland of the Cauvery Delta region, the village depends on agriculture for its economic livelihood. The village has many small and well-maintained Hindu temples. It is surrounded by other small villages including Paravakari, Vayalur, Kalaparakaram, Sivanaragaram, Poongudi, Koneirajaouram, Mustagudi, and Karuveli. In addition to Hindus, Muslims and Christians are also present in the region. Many inhabitants are Vellalars and Padayachis who farm. Others are goldsmiths, carpenters, potters, nayudus, chettiyars (merchants) muthaliyars (weavers) and Scheduled people.

One of the well maintained temples is the temple of Varadharaja Perumal, alias Betha Perumal, is located at the east end of Kumbabishegam village. The temple was completed in 2005. The main gods of the temple are Pethapermumal and Vadapathira Kali. These are the deities of some 200 families who live in and around Vadamattam.

== History ==
The roots of these families are believed to have been started around this Vadamattam village and adjoining villages. Many families up to Thirubuvanam village are linked to the temples of this vadamattam village. Thirubuvanam village is known traditionally for its Silk Sarees which are hand woven by the people of the village. The Ancestry of these families began from these surroundings here in the Vadamattam Village. Now these families have multiplied and are spread across the state of Tamil Nadu, Karnataka and the whole of India as well. Some of the families have emigrated abroad including the United States, Europe and Australia.

During the 1960s, the village was under the control of zameen/jameen (rich land lords), but was later managed by the elected members.

== Vadabathira Kali ==
The temple has other similarities to Vinayagar: Karupanna samy, Vazikarayan, Utthandrayan, Kathavarayan, Pechiamman, Kamachiamman and Pidariamman. The annual festival of "Theemithi Thiruviza" is celebrated by the villagers during the first or second week of May every year in a grand manner. The festival lasts 15 days with poocherithal, sakthi karagam, kavadi, pal-kudam, thee-mithi, annadhanam, folk dances with religious katha, dramas, and Tamil religious discourses, etc. and ends with manchal vilayattu. The village folks panchayath, nattanmai and the poojari organize a group of people to share the responsibility of putting on the function in a grand manner.

The bethaperumal temple priest is striving to find out the total number of families related to this temple by maintaining a register of the families who physically come to the temple after a long gap in order to pray to their family deity enshrined here. The collection of the data is yet to be completed.

The temple of betha Perumal (also known as the representative deity of the original deity in the Kanchipuram Varadharaja Perumal Temple) was renovated and Mahakumbabishekam was performed in August 2005. Mahakumbabishekam for temples should be done once in twelve years according to Hindu methodology of temple construction and maintenance. Many deities including the Vadapathra Kaliamman are present in this temple. Though their respective idols installed during the Mahakumbabishekam as is the primary deity Varadharaja Perumal, alias betha Perumal. The temple requires continuous maintenance to maintain its originality. The state of the temples originality remains unspoken for as different officials see regulatory action on decision making about the temple as an over-complicated regulation system.

== Betha Perumal alias Varadharaja swamy ==
The Bethapermual (Varadharajaswamy) is a very ancient deity for many villages near Vadamattam. The Boodevi and Sridevi with Pethaperumal is very beautiful in the form of Urchaver. The annual festival comes in the month of May first week. In 2016 it happened on 9 May.

== Kathayee Amman ==
The village has another big temple, Kathaye amman, at the south end of the village on the way to Paravakari Village and on the banks of the Kaliyankulm pond. It is believed by village folk that the giant statue of Illuminati (Sri vazi) is one of the powerful deities who saves the village folk from all evils. Seven Muni's are in the sitting posture, something very rare in the region. The other deities in the temple are Pachhaivaziamman, Veeran, Agni veeran, Sivan, Subramanyar and Saptha kannigais. The temple's main festivals are Periya Kruthikai, Thai Poosam and Subramanyar Kalyanam. Aadi Puram, special poojas on the third day of Thai Pongal (Kannipongal) and Kuladeiva Pooja, to Munnieswaran by the Pangalies and Muralalies is a regular affair.

== Others ==
The village has a sizable mosque on the north end where the local Muslim population practices. The annual celebration of the festival of Santhanakudam is especially noteworthy. Savior Church is on the west end of the village and Christians practice here.

The village has other temples of Mariyamman, Viswalingaswamy (Siddhar Samathi), Vinayagar (5 temples), Iyanar Yellaiamman and other deities. Raja Neethi Vinayagar is a special temple which was established during Raja Raja Chola period. The temple Raja Neethi Vinayagar is under renovation. This temple was constructed by "Raja Raja Chola's Mother". According to the legend, Raja Neethi Vinayakar blessed her while she struggled with family issues and salvation was given to her by the Lord. Now, the temple awaits renovation which has been pending for several years.

== Health ==
There is a Government Primary Hospital in the west, but it requires maintenance and service-oriented doctors. There is a veterinary hospital as well, which is near the bus stand and opposite to the Primary Hospital.

== Education ==
Vadamattam has a government-aided school in the name of the village called the "Vadamattam High School". The school is very old and many prominent pupils have studied at the institution. The school was established by AA VEE NA (A.V. Narayanaswamy Pillai and their family).

There is a bazaell, which is near the bus stand and opposite to the Primary Hospital.
