= Achudamangalam =

- village
- Location in Tamil Nadu, India
- Coordinates: 10.880799°N 79.589841°E
- Country: India
- State: Tamil Nadu
- District: Tiruvarur

Population (2001)
  - Total: 2,120

Languages
  - Official: Tamil
- Time zone: UTC+5:30 (IST)

Achudamangalam is a village in the Nannilam taluk of Tiruvarur district in Tamil Nadu, India.

== Demographics ==
As per the 2001 census, Achudamangalam had a population of 2,120 with 1,085 males and 1,035 females. The sex ratio was 954. The literacy rate was 69.36.
