= Anniyur =

Anniyur may refer to:

- Anniyur, Viluppuram, Tamil Nadu, India
- Anniyur, Tiruvarur, Tamil Nadu, India
