= Paravakottai =

Coordinates: 10.6005°N 79.4313°E

- village
- Nickname: Paravai
- Interactive map of Paravakottai
- Country: India
- State: Tamil Nadu
- District: Thiruvarur

Government
  - Body: Grama Panchayat

Population (2021)
  - Total: above 10,000

Languages
  - Official: Tamil
- Time zone: UTC+5:30 (IST)

Paravakkottai is a village in the Mannargudi Taluk of Thiruvarur district, Tamil Nadu, India. It is surrounded by many Rivers and Ponds. Paravakkottai consist of streets like North street, West street, South street, Middle street, Thilagar Street etc. The streets are elegantly arranged in such a manner that all the streets end at the river bed. There are many temples. The nearby town is Mannargudi in north and Madukkur in the south.

== People caste ==
Agamudayar form the majority group in this village. Castes such as Ambalakarar, Parayar and Chettiyar are also found.

== Occupation ==
Agriculture is one of the main occupations. Rice, sugarcane, groundnut, and coconut are the major crops cultivated in this village.

Farming and business are the main activities of the people in Paravakkottai. Although Paravakkottai is not in lower ground to the nearby water tank, ground water is always available.

== Schools ==
In the village there are 3 government schools and 1 private school. There are 2 elementary schools.

Government higher secondary was located in main road near the state bank 6 to 12 Tamil medium and English medium also available and groups available are computer science, math, biology, and vocational groups.

== Bank ==
State Bank of India is located in this village. It is opposite to Government Higher Secondary School. The Bank have one attached ATM center

== Transportation ==
Paravakkottai is located between Mannargudi and Adirampattinam in the route of Madukkur. Paravakkottai is connected by road to Chennai (333 km), capital of Tamil Nadu (333 km) and other major towns in South India. Nearest major railway station is Mannargudi (12 km). The nearest international airport is Tiruchirapalli (103 km).

== Demographics ==
As per the 2011 census, Paravakkottai had a total population of 7698 with 3937 males and 3761 females. Male literacy stands at 84.71% while female literacy rate was 65.91%.
