= Adambar Ukkadai =

- village
- Interactive map of Adambar Ukkadai
- Coordinates: 10.911921°N 79.563154°E
- Country: India
- State: Tamil Nadu
- District: Tiruvarur

Population (2001)
  - Total: 4,540

Languages
  - Official: Tamil
- Time zone: UTC+5:30 (IST)

Adambar Ukkadai is a village in the Kudavasal taluk of Tiruvarur district in Tamil Nadu, India.

== Demographics ==
As per the 2001 census, Adambar Ukkadai had a population of 4,540 with 2,230 males and 2,310 females. The sex ratio was 1036.
