= Alangudi, Nannilam =

Alangudi
- village
- Interactive map of Alangudi
- Coordinates: 10.883694°N 79.650895°E
- Country: India
- State: Tamil Nadu
- District: Tiruvarur

Population (2001)
  - Total: 1,464

Languages
  - Official: Tamil
- Time zone: UTC+5:30 (IST)

Alangudi is a village in the Nannilam taluk of Tiruvarur district in Tamil Nadu, India.

== Demographics ==
As per the 2001 census, Alangudi had a population of 1,464 with 763 males and 701 females. The sex ratio was 919. The literacy rate was 76.55.
