= Killiyur =

Killiyur may refer to:

- Killiyur, Tiruvarur
- Killiyur, Kanniyakumari
- Killiyur (State Assembly Constituency)
