= Kamugakudi =

Kamugakudi is a small, ancient heritage village in Nannilam taluk, Tiruvarur district, Tamil Nadu, India.
