= Annadanapuram =

Coordinates: 11°00′N 79°43′E

- village
- Interactive map of Annadanapuram
- Country: India
- State: Tamil Nadu
- District: Tiruvarur

Population (2001)
  - Total: 1,706

Languages
  - Official: Tamil
- Time zone: UTC+5:30 (IST)

Annadanapuram is a village in the Nannilam taluk of Tiruvarur district in Tamil Nadu, India.

== Demographics ==
As per the 2001 census, Annadanapuram had a population of 1,706 with 845 males and 861 females. The sex ratio was 1,019. The literacy rate was 81.31%.
