= Erukattur =

Erukkattur
- village
- Location in Tamil Nadu, India
- Coordinates: 10.7409°N 79.5474°E
- Country: India
- State: Tamil Nadu
- District: Thiruvarur

Government
  - Panchayat President: S.Raja

Population (2001)
  - Total: 1,059

Languages
  - Official: Tamil
- Time zone: UTC+5:30 (IST)
- PIN: 610 102
- Area code: +914367

Erukkattur is a village in the Koothanallur taluk of Thiruvarur district in Tamil Nadu, India. The village is located 10.2 km southwest of Thiruvarur and 10.5 km southeast of Koradacheri. Very recently the taluk was changed from Kudavasal to Koothanallur.

== Demographics ==
As per the 2001 census, Erukattur had a population of 1,059 with 525 males and 534 females. The sex ratio was 1017. The literacy rate was 72.9.
