= Adambar-II =

- village
- Location in Tamil Nadu, India Adambar-II (India)
- Coordinates: 10.912117°N 79.599796°E
- Country: India
- State: Tamil Nadu
- District: Tiruvarur

Population (2001)
  - Total: 1,709

Languages
  - Official: Tamil
- Time zone: UTC+5:30 (IST)

Adambar is a village in the Nannilam taluk of Tiruvarur district in Tamil Nadu, India.

As per the 2001 census, Adambar OR Athambar had a population of 1,609 with 824 males and 785 females. The sex ratio was 953. The literacy rate was 80.74.
