= Kamukakudi =

- village
- Country: India
- State: Tamil Nadu
- District: Tiruvarur

Population (2001)
  - Total: 1,629

Languages
  - Official: Tamil
- Time zone: UTC+5:30 (IST)

Kamukakudi is a village in the Kudavasal taluk of Tiruvarur district in Tamil Nadu, India.

== Demographics ==
As per the 2001 census, Kamukakudi had a population of 1,629 with 798 males and 831 females. The sex ratio was 1041. The literacy rate was 65.71.
