= Vangathangudi =

- village
- Country: India
- State: Tamil Nadu

Languages
  - Official: Tamil
- Time zone: UTC+5:30 (IST)

Vangathangudi, also known as Vengathangudi, is a village panchayat near Mannargudi, in Thiruvarur District in the Indian state of Tamil Nadu. It has the Vairavanathar temple and a panchayat school.

== Demographics ==
Vangathangudi itself has more than 300 families and nearly 900 eligible voters.

== Governance ==
Due to the delimitation, Vangathangudi is part of the Thiruthuraipoondi assembly constituency. Earlier, Vangathangudi was in Mannargudi constituency.

== Economy ==
The main source of livelihood is agriculture. Farming is possible for only six months a year, due to irrigation, which depends on Mettur Reservoir. The agriculture around this area mainly depends on the rivers Koraiyaru and Pamaniyar. Paddy is the principal crop. Greengram, blackgram, gingelly, and cotton are also cultivated after harvesting Paddy. Most of the people commute to Thiruppur, Coiambatore and Chennai to find jobs during summer.

Vangathangudi is rich in oil resources since it is in the Cauvery asset.

== Demographics ==
It has a higher literacy rate than surrounding villages. The population numbers 1313, with 654 males and 659 females. Households number 344. The literacy rate is 72.69.

== Geography ==
Vangathangudi is a panchayat that includes the villages Vedapuram and Singamangalam. Nearby towns include Mannargudi (18 km), Thiruthuraipoondi (14 km) and Muthupet (12 km).

== Transport ==
Tamil Nadu Government buses are available from Mannargudi and Thiruthuraipoondi regularly.
