= Alathur, Mannargudi =

Alathur
- village
- Country: India
- State: Tamil Nadu
- District: Tiruvarur

Population (2001)
  - Total: 1,626

Languages
  - Official: Tamil
- Time zone: UTC+5:30 (IST)

Alathur is a village in the Mannargudi taluk of Tiruvarur district in Tamil Nadu, India.

== Demographics ==
As per the 2001 census, Alathur had a population of 1,626 with 841 males and 785 females. The sex ratio was 933. The literacy rate was 67.39.

== Temples ==
Historical Viswanatha Swamy Temple and Venugopala Swamy Temple are located here.

=== Idol Theft ===
The Chola-era bronzes were stolen from the temples more than 50 years ago. The Idol Wing of the Tamil Nadu Criminal Investigation Department (IW-CID) has traced them to various museums/institutions in the United States.

- Venugopala Swamy Temple

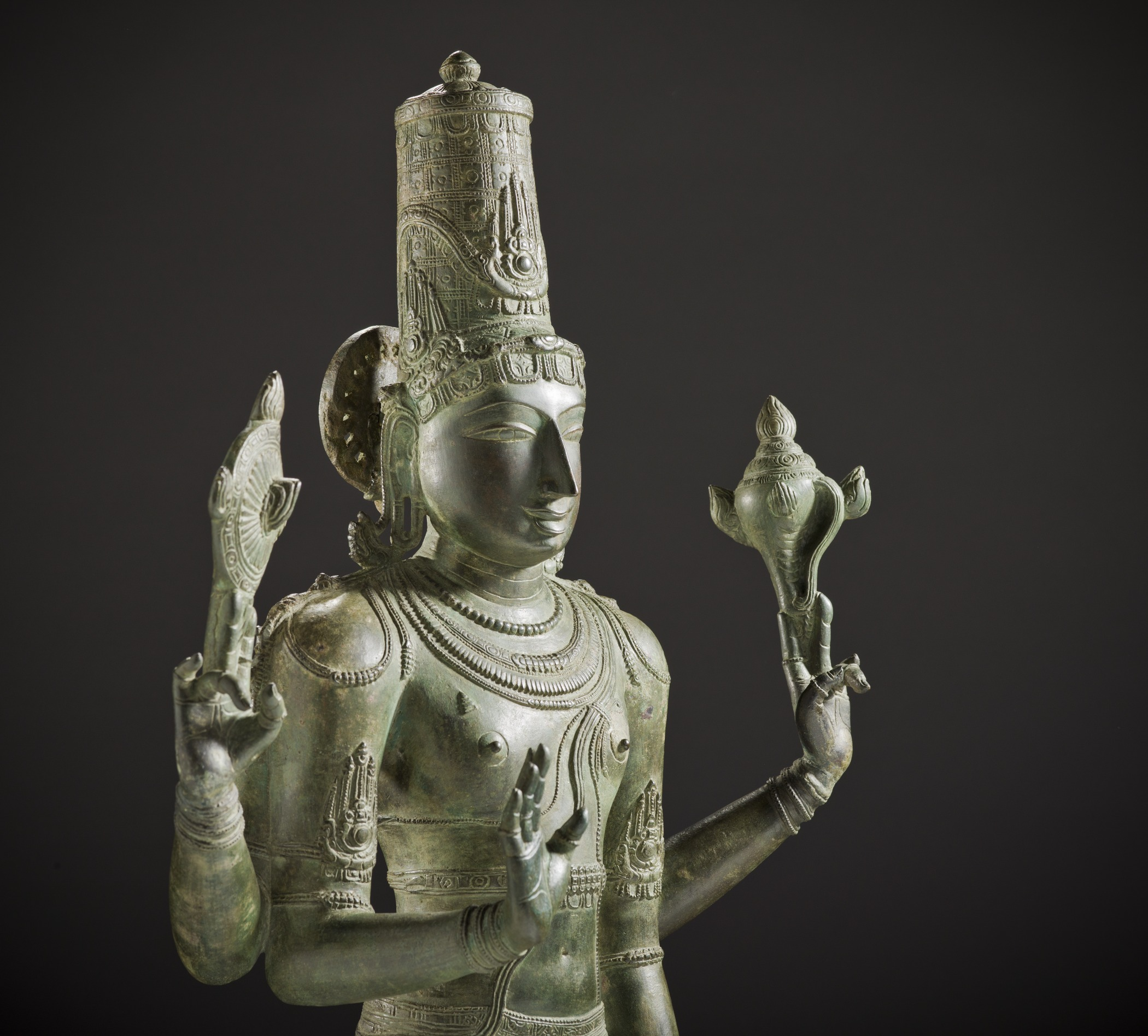
Vishnu (LACMA)

S.No.	Deity	Stolen Idol traced to	Country	Current status	More Details
1	Vishnu	Los Angeles County Museum of Art	United States	Unknown	
2	Sridevi	Los Angeles County Museum of Art	United States	Unknown	
3	Bhudevi	Los Angeles County Museum of Art	United States	Unknown	

- Viswanatha Swamy Temple

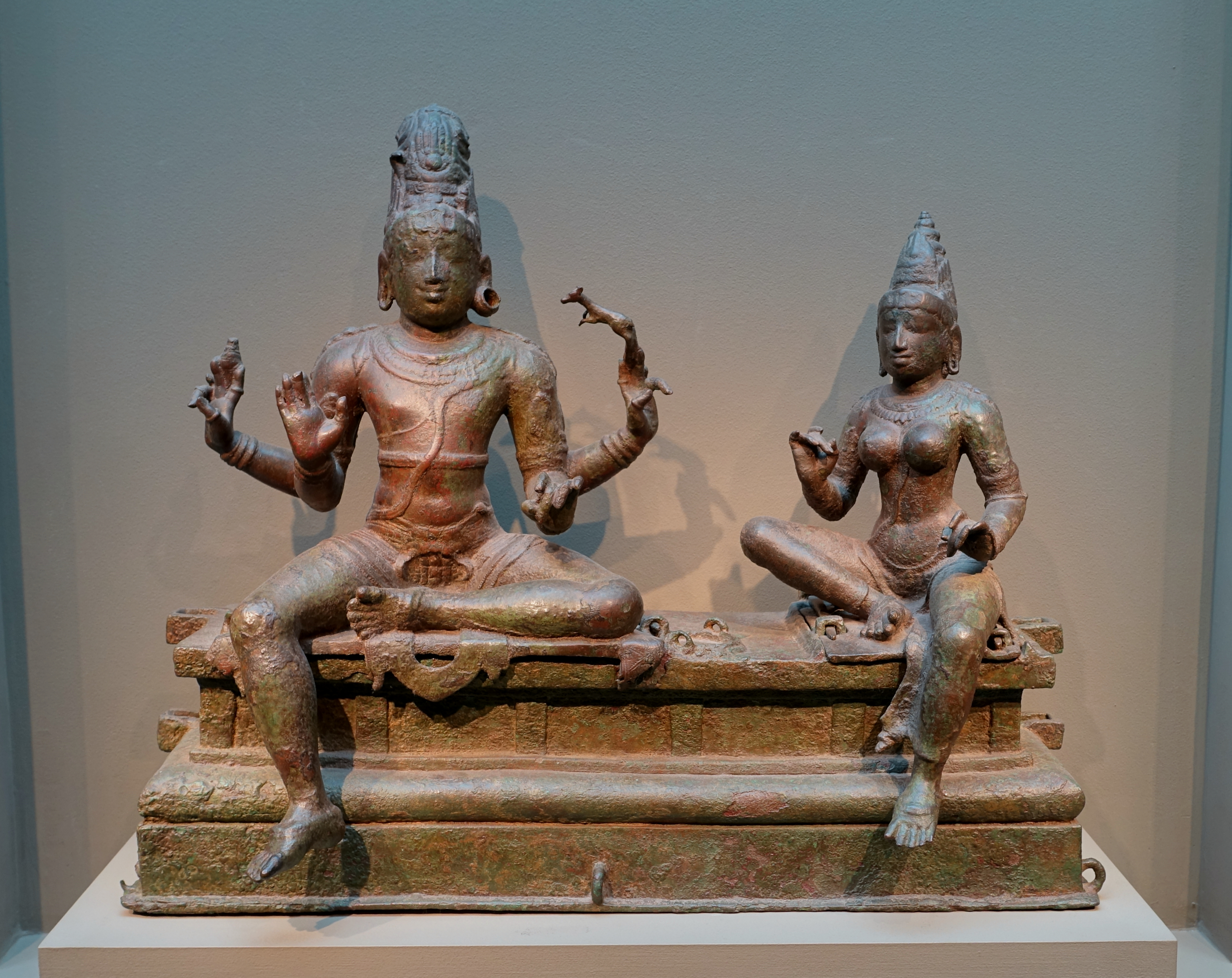
Somaskanda (Freer Gallery)

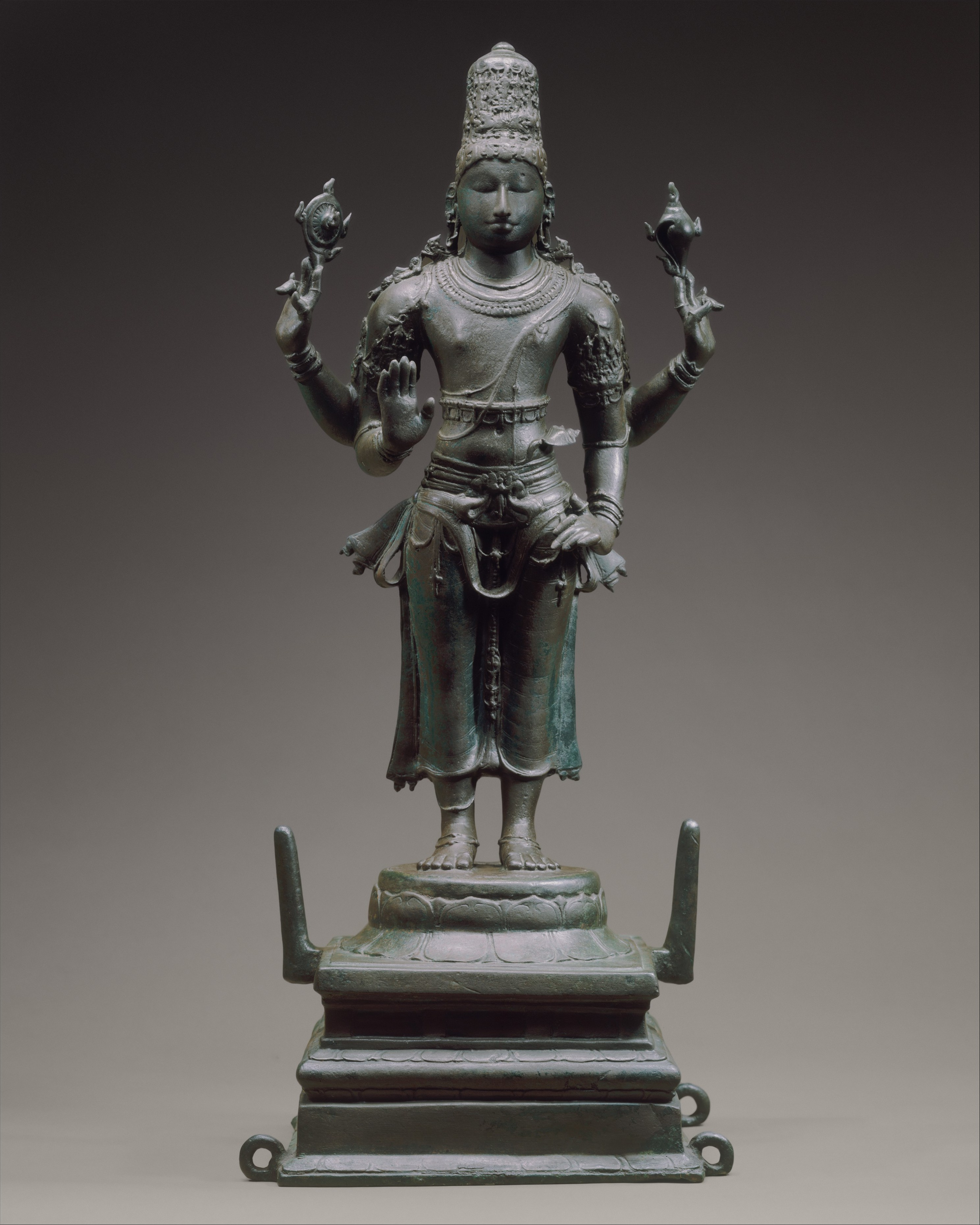
Vishnu (Met Museum)

S.No.	Deity	Stolen Idol traced to	Country	Current status	More Details
1	Somaskanda	Freer Gallery of Art	United States	Unknown	
2	Dancing Sambandar	Norton Simon Museum	United States	Unknown	Auctioned by Christie's in 2011
3	Yoganarasimha	Nelson-Atkins Museum of Art	United States	Unknown	
4	Ganesha	Nelson-Atkins Museum of Art	United States	Unknown	
5	Dancing Krishna	Christie's		Unknown	Auctioned by Christie's in 2020
6	Standing Vishnu	Metropolitan Museum of Art	United States	Unknown	
