= Anniyur, Tiruvarur =

Anniyur Thiruvanniyur
- village
- Interactive map of Anniyur
- Coordinates: 10.9708679°N 79.5669022°E
- Country: India
- State: Tamil Nadu
- District: Tiruvarur

Population (2001)
  - Total: 2,067

Languages
  - Official: Tamil
- Time zone: UTC+5:30 (IST)
- Postal code: 609501

Anniyur is a village in the Kudavasal taluk of Tiruvarur district, Tamil Nadu, India.

== Demographics ==
As of 2001 census, Anniyur had a total population of 2067 with 1081 males and 986 females. The sex ratio was 912. The literacy rate was 83.59.
