= Annavasal, Tiruvarur =

Annavasal
- village
- Location in Tamil Nadu, India Annavasal (India)
- Coordinates: 10°28′N 78°42′E
- Country: India
- State: Tamil Nadu
- District: Tiruvarur

Population (2001)
  - Total: 682

Languages
  - Official: Tamil
- Time zone: UTC+5:30 (IST)

Annavasal is a village in the Kudavasal taluk of Tiruvarur district, Tamil Nadu, India. As of 2001 census, Annavasal had a total population of 682 with 342 males and 340 females. The sex ratio was 994. The literacy rate was 71.14.
