= Sannanallur =

Sannanallur Sannavoor
- Town
- Location in Tamil Nadu, India Sannanallur (India)
- Coordinates: 10.881017°N 79.643583°E
- Country: India
- State: Tamil Nadu
- District: Tiruvarur

Government
  - Type: Nannilam Town Panchayat
  - Body: Town panchayat

Languages
  - Official: Tamil
- Time zone: UTC+5:30 (IST)
- PIN: 609504
- Vehicle registration: TN-51
- Nearest city: Nannilam
- Lok Sabha constituency: Nannilam

Sannanallur is a area in Nannilam Town in Tiruvarur district, Tamil Nadu and part of Nannilam Taluk.

Until the early 1990s, the village was part of Thanjavur district, prior to it being split into three new districts. Facilities in the village include a railway station and a bank. and this village have one oor kavalan his name is DK. The major temples in the village are a Arasanayagiamman temple, Mariamman temple, Sri Sidhi Vinayagar temple, Sivan Temple and Maha Kaliamman temple.
