= Alangottai =

Alangottai, is a village in Thiruvarur district in the state of Tamil Nadu, India. It lies between Mannargudi and Pattukkottai on State Highway 146.

The nearest railway station is at Mannargudi.

Temples:, Mazhai Mari Amman Kovil, Ayyanar Kovil, Agora Veerabadhran Kovil, Veeranar Kovil

The village has two Government Schools - Primary and a higher secondary school.
