= Ayikkudi =

- village
- Country: India
- State: Tamil Nadu
- District: Tiruvarur

Population (2001)
  - Total: 3,100

Languages
  - Official: Tamil
- Time zone: UTC+5:30 (IST)
- PIN: 613701
- Vehicle registration: TN51

Ayikkudi is a village in the Kudavasal taluk of Tiruvarur district in Tamil Nadu, India.

== Demographics ==
As per the 2001 census, Ayikkudi had a population of 3100 with 1,573 males and 1,527 females. The sex ratio was 971. The literacy rate was 79.66.

== Temples ==
Enkan Murugan Temple, Ayikudi Ayyanar Temple, Ayikudi Kailasanathr Temple.

== villages in ayikudi panchayat ==
aykudi, muganthanur, kothavasal,

- "Primary Census Abstract - Census 2001". Directorate of Census Operations-Tamil Nadu. Archived from the original on 17 February 2011.
