= Palayakkottai =

Coordinates: 10.533°N 79.480°E

Paravakkottai is a village in the Mannargudi Taluk of Thiruvarur district, Tamil Nadu, India.
