= Manakkal Ayyempet =

- Village
- Manakkal
- Location in Tamil Nadu, India
- Coordinates: 10°49′10″N 79°34′32″E
- Country: India
- State: Tamil Nadu
- District: Tiruvarur
- Taluk: Tiruvarur
- Block: Koradacheri

Area
  - Total: 4.64 km^{2} (1.79 sq mi)
- PIN: 610 104
- Telephone code: 04366
- Vehicle registration: TN 50

Manakkal Ayyempet is an Indian village in Tiruvarur District in Tamil Nadu.

== Demographics ==
As of 2011 census, Ayyampettai had a population of 3546 with 1784 males and 1762 females. The sex ratio was 987. The literacy rate was 81.34.
