= Asesham =

- Village
- Country: India
- State: Tamil Nadu
- District: Tiruvarur

Population (2011)
  - Total: 5,787

Languages
  - Official: Tamil
- Time zone: UTC+5:30 (IST)

Asesham is a village in the Mannargudi taluk of Tiruvarur district in Tamil Nadu, India. It is spread over an area 902.7 hectares.

== Demographics ==
In 2011, Asesham had a population of 5,787 people. In 2001, it had a population of 3,796 people, of which 1,910 were female and 1,886 male, with a resulting sex ratio of 1,013 females to every 1,000 males. The literacy rate was 77.92% in 2001.
