= Elavangargudi =

- village
- Country: India
- State: Tamil Nadu
- District: Tiruvarur

Population (2001)
  - Total: 4,618

Languages
  - Official: Tamil
- Time zone: UTC+5:30 (IST)

Elavangargudi is a village in the Thiruvarur taluk of Tiruvarur district in Tamil Nadu, India. It's in a distance of 3.4 kilometres from Thiruvarur.

== Demographics ==
As per the 2001 census, Elavangargudi had a population of 4,618 with 2,280 males and 2,338 females. The sex ratio was 1025. The literacy rate was 85.37.
