= Mudikondan River =

River in India

Coordinates: 10°52′53″N 79°36′42″E

The Mudikondan River is a distributary of the Kaveri River. It branches out from the Kaveri near Papanasam and runs for about 50 kilometres (31 mi) before joining the Tirumalarajanar River near the town of Mudikondan in Tiruvarur district.

Around 250 houses near the river bank were given notices to vacate in April 2022 following a court order.

Udayalur in south bank of Mudikondan river, Kumbakonam Taluk, Thanjavur District, is stated to be the burial site of King Rajaraja Chola.
