= Lakshmangudi =

Village in Thiruvarur, Tamil Nadu, India

Coordinates: 10°43′N 79°31′E

Lakshmangudi is a suburb of Koothanallur in Koothanallur taluk in Thiruvarur district, Tamil Nadu, India. The postal code is 614102.
