= Ammaiyappan =

- village
- Interactive map of Ammaiyappan
- Coordinates: 10.7875057°N 79.5649194°E
- Country: India
- State: Tamil Nadu
- District: Tiruvarur

Population (2001)
  - Total: 4,616

Languages
  - Official: Tamil
- Time zone: UTC+5:30 (IST)

Ammaiyappan is a village in the Tiruvarur taluk of Tiruvarur district, Tamil Nadu, India.

== Demographics ==
As per the 2001 census, Ammaiyappan had a total population of 4616 with 2233 males and 2383 females. The sex ratio was 1.067. The literacy rate was 80.44.
