= Pakkam Kottur =

Pakkam Kottur kottur
- village
- Country: India
- State: Tamil Nadu
- District: Nagapattinam

Languages
  - Official: Tamil
- Time zone: UTC+5:30 (IST)
- PIN: 609701
- Vehicle registration: 1000
- Nearest city: Tiruvarur
- Lok Sabha constituency: Nagapattinam

Pakkam Kottur is a small village in Tamil Nadu, a southern state of India. The nearest town of significant size which is Tiruvarur is 16 km away, Mayiladuthurai is 30 km, and Nagapattinam is around 20 km away. The PIN code of the village is 609701.

There is bus services from Tiruvarur daily. The nearest railway station was 3 kilometres away in Visalur but the introduction of bus services put an end to the Visalur station in 1988. Now the nearest railway station is Nannilam.

The village boasts of an Indian Overseas Bank branch, a post office and other basic amenities. There is a govt primary school in the village but those wishing to get a secondary education need to go to Enangudi, 2.5 km away. Most of them own rice fields and it is a means of income for them. A majority of the villagers are Muslims, and most of the males are working in foreign countries like Singapore, Malaysia, Kuwait, Saudi Arabia, United States, and UAE. Recently, the villagers have realised the importance of education and are sending their children to colleges and universities and the number of villagers going overseas for business, manual labour is decreasing.

There are around 1,000 houses, two mosques, a few temples, and about 30 shops in the village. Pakkam Kottur is surrounded by 8 or 9 mini-villages.

This village is known for its scenic surrounding and calm atmosphere. To the south, a river bordered by paddy fields is particularly notable during the June - sep season. Surrounded by famous temples such as Thirukannapuram is just 3 km away. Thennamarkuddi (famous for treating Bone injury) is just 3.5 km away. People usually visits surrounding towns like Tiruvarur, Kariakkal, Nagapattinam, Mailadithurai, and Kumbakonam for all their major shopping needs, visiting specialists Drs. Nagoor & Velankanni is about 25 km & 40 km respectively.

== Media ==
Pakkam Kottur is also served by AmudhamFM, an online Tamil radio station based in Tamil Nadu. The station broadcasts Tamil music, entertainment programmes, news, and community-oriented content for Tamil-speaking listeners.

AmudhamFM is available online through its official website and radio streaming platforms, allowing listeners from India and abroad to access its programmes. The station also provides online radio services through web and mobile platforms.

The online radio station can be accessed at amudhamfm.com.
