= Devarkandanallur =

- village
- Location in Tamil Nadu, India
- Coordinates: 10°46′N 79°37′E
- Country: India
- State: Tamil Nadu
- District: Tiruvarur

Population (2001)
  - Total: 1,844

Languages
  - Official: Tamil
- Time zone: UTC+5:30 (IST)

Devarkandanallur is a village in the Thiruvarur taluk of Tiruvarur district in Tamil Nadu, India.

== Demographics ==
As of 2001 census, Devarkandanallur had a population of 1,844 with 879 males and 965 females. The sex ratio was 1098. The literacy rate was 76.28. It is located on the main highway connecting Tiruvarur and Mannargudi. The railway station nearer to this village is Kulikarai, which comes under Tiruvarur-Tanjore line. Only passenger trains will stop at Kulikarai. Frequent bus facility is available from Tiruvarur and Mannargudi.
