= Abivirutheeswaram =

- village
- Nickname: abivai
- Location in Tamil Nadu, India Abivirutheeswaram (India)
- Coordinates: 10.793893°N 79.47739°E
- Country: India
- State: Tamil Nadu
- District: thiruvarur

Population (2001)
  - Total: 1,351 with 643 males and 708 females.

Languages
  - Official: Tamil
- Time zone: UTC+5:30 (IST)
- Postal code: 613705
- Vehicle registration: TN50

Abivirutheeswaram is a village in the Kudavasal taluk of Tiruvarur district, Tamil Nadu, India.

== Demographics ==
As per the 2001 census, Abivirutheeswaram had a total population of 1432 with 657 males and 775 females. The sex ratio was 1180. The literacy rate was 74.8.
