= Nellivananathar Temple =

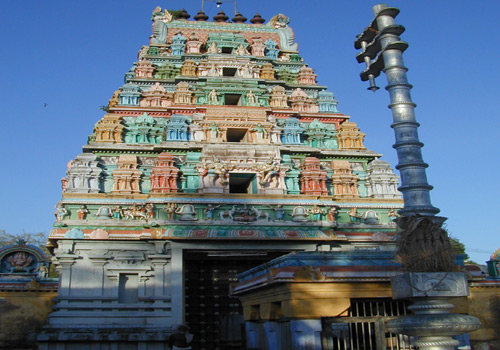

Religion
- Affiliation: Hinduism
- District: Tiruvarur
- Deity: Lord Shiva

Location
- Location: Tiruvarur
- State: Tamil Nadu
- Country: India

Architecture
- Type: Dravidian architecture

Nellivananathar Temple, also known as Thirunellikaa, is a Hindu temple in the Tiruvarur district of Tamil Nadu, India. The presiding deity is Shiva.
