= Nachikulam =

Town in Tamil Nadu, India

- Village
- Nachikulam
- Location within Tamil Nadu Location within India
- Coordinates: 10°26′31″N 79°33′16″E
- Country: India
- State: Tamil Nadu
- District: Thiruvarur
- Zone: Cauvery Delta
- Region: Chola Nadu

Government
  - Type: Panchayat
  - Body: Udayamarthandapuram panchayat

Languages
  - Official: Tamil
- Time zone: UTC+5:30 (IST)
- PIN: 614706
- Area code: 04369
- Vehicle registration: TN 50

Nachikulam is a village administered by the Udayamarthandapuram Panchayath in Thiruvarur district in the Indian state of Tamil Nadu. ECR East Coast Road pass through this village. It is also a part of newly formed Muthupet. Taluk.

== Demographics ==
Nachikulam has a population of roughly 2000 people. Tamil is the local language spoken there.

== Geography ==
Nachikulam is situated in the southern part of Cauvery delta, between Thiruthuraipoondi and Pattukkottai, and is about around 350 km from Chennai. Muthupet is the nearby town, about 9 km distant.

Udayamarthandapuram Bird Sanctuary is situated in Nachikulam. Thousands of birds from all around the world can be seen . It is a major tourist spot in Thiruvarur district.

== Religion ==
People follow Islam and Hinduism beliefs. Nachikulam has more than 3 Hindu temples and 4 mosques.

== Economics ==
Agriculture is the main source of income, although some residents commute to other places for work.

== Transport ==
The East Coast Road (ECR) from Chennai to Kanyakumari district connects this village as well. Frequent Bus services are available to nearby towns Nagapattinam(58 km), Thiruthuraipoondi(16 km) and Pattukkottai (26 km).

Nachikulam has a railway station near the ECR called Thillaivilagam. Thillaivilagam Railway Station is on the Karaikkudi-Thiruvarur broadguage line. Thiruvarur-Karaikudi-Thiruvarur Demo rail Service runs daily except Sunday. Ernakulam - Velankanni - Ernakulam express also operates on Sunday only, but does not stop at Thillaivilagam. No direct trains connect Chennai to Thillaivilagam.

Tiruchirappalli International Airport is the nearest airport (120 km).

== Infrastructure ==
Nachikulam has a small bazaar with more than 50 shops, Bharat Petroleum - petrol bunk, 2 marriage halls and good mobile phone network, DBS Bank, 4 ATMs (DBS, State Bank of India, India 1, Hitachi) are available.

== Education ==
A Govt. higher secondary school, Millennium Matriculation school, and a Govt. library are in the village.
