= Mela Amaravathi =

- Village
- Country: India
- State: Tamil Nadu
- District: Thiruvarur

Languages
  - Official: Tamil
- Time zone: UTC+5:30 (IST)
- PIN: 612801
- Telephone code: 04374
- Vehicle registration: TN 68 & TN 49

Mela Amaravathi (also known as Amaravathi) is a panchayat in the Valangaiman taluk of Thiruvarur district in the Indian state of Tamil Nadu.

Alangudi (Gurusthalam) is 2 kilometers away, Valangaiman (mariyamman koil) is 5 km away.

== Politics ==
Valangiman belongs to Nannilam assembly constituency (SC), and is part of Nagapattinam (Lok Sabha constituency).
