= Elaiyur, Tiruvarur =

Elaiyur
- village
- Country: India
- State: Tamil Nadu
- District: Tiruvarur

Population (2001)
  - Total: 2,025

Languages
  - Official: Tamil
- Time zone: UTC+5:30 (IST)

Elaiyur is a village in the Kudavasal taluk of Tiruvarur district in Tamil Nadu, India.

== Demographics ==
As of 2001 census, Elaiyur had a population of 2,025 with 961 males and 1,064 females. The sex ratio was 1107. The literacy rate was 77.19.
