= Kankoduthavanitham =

- village
- Nickname: mukkootu
- Country: India
- State: Tamil Nadu
- District: Tiruvarur

Population (2001)
  - Total: 1,659

Languages
  - Official: Tamil
- Time zone: UTC+5:30 (IST)
- Postal code: 610102

Kankoduthavanitham is a village in the Koothanallur taluk of Tiruvarur district in Tamil Nadu,

== Demographics ==
As per the 2001 census, Kankoduthavanitham had a population of 1,659 with 818 males and 841 females. The sex ratio was 1,028. The literacy rate was 74.15.
