= Melathiruppalakudi =

Melathiruppalakudi is a village in Thiruvarur district, Tamil Nadu. It is under Mannargudi Taluk. Its pincode is 614018.
