= Someswarapuram, Thanjavur =

Someswarapuram
- village
- Country: India
- State: Tamil Nadu
- District: Thanjavur

Languages
  - Official: Tamil
- Time zone: UTC+5:30 (IST)
- Postal code: 613204

Someswarapuram is a village in the Papanasam taluk of Thanjavur district in the Indian state of Tamil Nadu.

== Demographics ==
Tamil is the local language spoken here.

== Location ==
It is located at the border of Thanjavur District, Tiruvarur district and Ariyalur district and 311 km away from Chennai. Thanjavur Junction railway station is the nearest major railway station to Someswarapuram.
