= Agarathirunallur =

- village
- Location in Tamil Nadu, India
- Coordinates: 10.790565°N 79.596863°E
- Country: India
- State: Tamil Nadu
- District: Tiruvarur

Population (2001)
  - Total: 1,584

Languages
  - Official: Tamil
- Time zone: UTC+5:30 (IST)

Agarathirunallur is a village in the Kudavasal taluk of Tiruvarur district, Tamil Nadu, India.

== Demographics ==
As per the 2001 census, Agarathirunallur had a total population of 1584 with 838 males and 746 females. The sex ratio was 890. The literacy rate was 62.02.
