= Kattur, Thiruvarur district =

Kattur (Kottur) is a small village in Tiruvarur district, Tamil Nadu, India. This village is a part of the Cauvery Delta region and agriculture is its major occupation. Vennar and Vettar, tributaries of the Cauvery River, are the major water bodies around the village. The village comes under Kattur Panchayath. It is located 3 km north of the district headquarters of Tiruvarur and 313 km from Chennai. The Central University of Tamil Nadu and Thiruvarur Medical College are nearby in Kattur. The Sundaresvarar Temple, Kottur Kozhundeeswarar Temple and Kaliamman Temple are located here.
