= Arasavanangadu =

Coordinates: 10°49′N 79°33′E

- village
- Interactive map of Arasavanangadu
- Country: India
- State: Tamil Nadu
- District: Tiruvarur

Population (2001)
  - Total: 1,497

Languages
  - Official: Tamil
- Time zone: UTC+5:30 (IST)

Arasavanangadu is a village in the Kudavasal taluk of Tiruvarur district in Tamil Nadu, India.

== Demographics ==
As per the 2001 census, Arasavanangadu had a population of 1,497 with 761 males and 736 females. The sex ratio was 967. The literacy rate was 72.33.
