= Kandiramanickkam, Tiruvarur =

Kandiramanickkam
- village
- Location in Tamil Nadu, India
- Coordinates: 10.050152°N 78.630763°E
- Country: India
- State: Tamil Nadu
- District: Tiruvarur

Population (2001)
  - Total: 2,030

Languages
  - Official: Tamil
- Time zone: UTC+5:30 (IST)

Kandiramanickkam is a village in the Thirupathur taluk of Sivagangai district in Tamil Nadu, India.

== Demographics ==
As of 2001 census, Kandiramanickkam had a population of 2,030 with 1,040 males and 990 females. The sex ratio was 952. The literacy rate was 76.95.
