= Thappalampuliyur =

- village
- Country: India
- State: Tamil Nadu
- District: Tiruvarur

Languages
  - Official: Tamil
- Time zone: UTC+5:30 (IST)
- PIN: 610106
- Vehicle registration: TN-50
- Nearest city: Thiruvarur

Thappalampuliyur is a village situated 5 km south east of Thiruvarur in Tamil Nadu, India.
