= Rathnapureeswarar Temple =

Shiva temple in Tamil Nadu, India

Religion
- Affiliation: Hinduism
- District: Tiruvarur
- Deity: Lord Shiva

Location
- Location: Thirunattiyathangudi
- State: Tamil Nadu
- Country: India

Rathnapureeswarar Temple is a Hindu temple located in Thirunattiyathangudi in the Tiruvarur district of Tamil Nadu, India. The presiding deity is Shiva.

== Legend ==
According to legend, when the Chola king Ratnendra Chola tried to partition diamonds in the treasury with his brother but was unable to reach a compromise. At this juncture, Shiva is believed to have appeared to the brothers as a diamond merchant and facilitated the division. In gratitude, Ratnendra Chola built the temple.

== Significance ==
Thirunattiyathangudi is considered to be the birthplace of Kotpuli Nayanar, one of the 63 Nayanmars. Hymns praise of the temple have been sung by Sundarar in the Thevaram.
