= Killiyur, Tiruvarur =

Killiyur
- village
- Country: India
- State: Tamil Nadu
- District: Tiruvarur

Languages
  - Official: Tamil
- Time zone: UTC+5:30 (IST)
- Vehicle registration: TN-

Killiyur is a village in Tiruvarur district, Tamil Nadu, India.
