= Athikkadai =

- Village
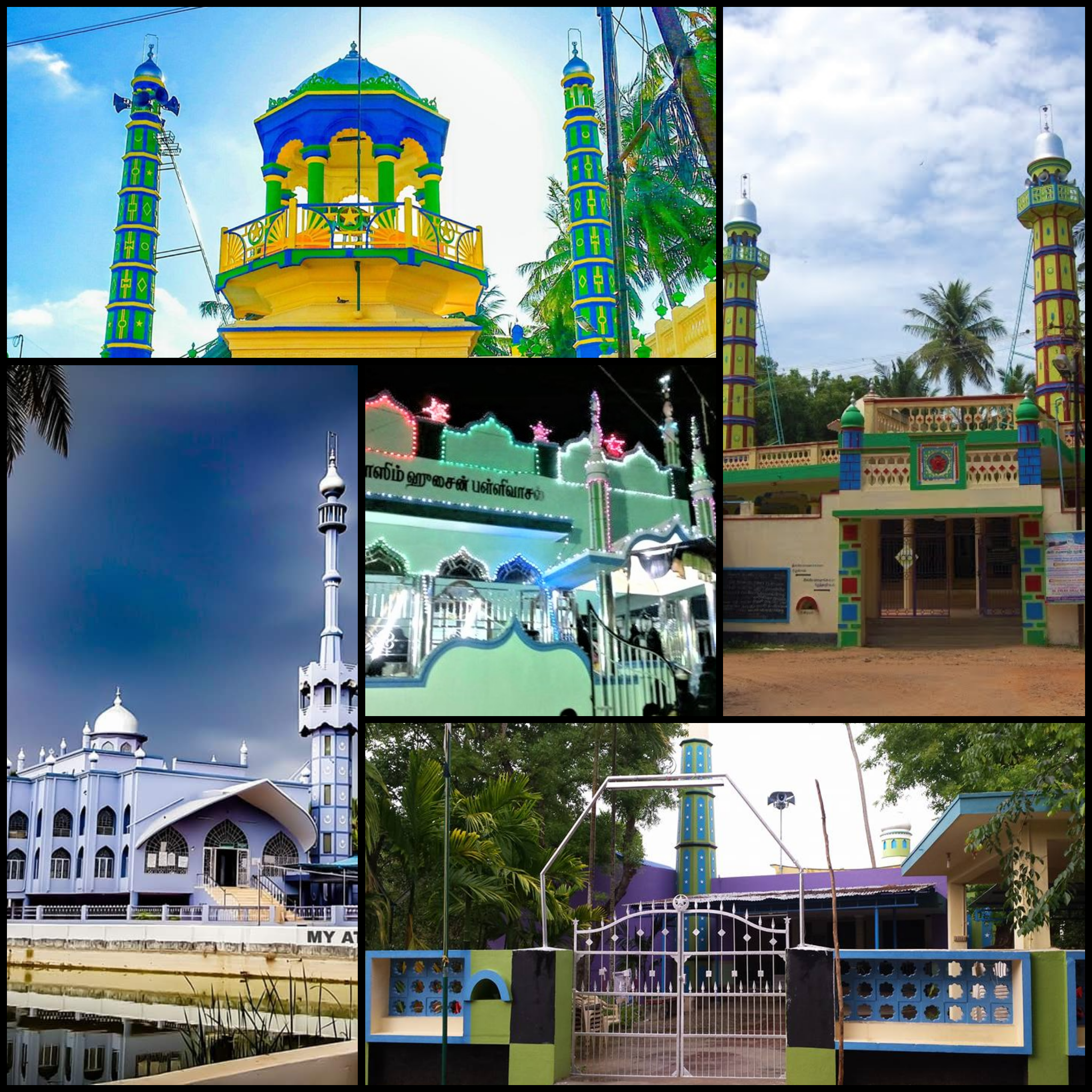

- Location in Tamil Nadu, India
- Coordinates: 10.751°N 79.503°E
- Country: India
- State: Tamil Nadu
- District: Thiruvarur

Area
  - Total: 3.02 km^{2} (1.17 sq mi)

Population (2011)
  - Total: 3,848
  - Density: 1,270/km^{2} (3,300/sq mi)

Languages
  - Official: Tamil
- Time zone: UTC+5:30 (IST)
- PIN: 613702
- Telephone code: 04366
- Vehicle registration: TN50

Athikkadai is a village in the Tiruvarur district in Tamil Nadu, India. As of the 2011 Indian census, Athikkadai had 3,848 inhabitants. Out of this number, 1,791 were males, while 2,057 were females.
