= Alathur, Tiruchirappalli district =

Alathur
- Interactive map of Alathur
- Coordinates: 10.784231°N 78.746612°E
- Country: India
- State: Tamil Nadu
- District: Tiruchirappalli

Population (2019)
  - Total: 1,300

Languages
  - Official: Tamil
- Time zone: UTC+5:30 (IST)
- Postal code: 620011

Alathur is a neighbourhood of the city of Tiruchirappalli in Tamil Nadu, India. It is situated in the heart of the city. Tiruchirappalli Corporation in 2011.

== Demographics ==
As per the 2017 census, Alathur had a population of 3500 with 1700 males and 1300 females. The sex ratio was 1570 and the literacy rate, 80.5.
