= Alathur, Kudavasal =

Alathur
- village
- Interactive map of Alathur
- Coordinates: 10.959286°N 79.641641°E
- Country: India
- State: Tamil Nadu
- District: Tiruvarur

Population (2001)
  - Total: 1,785

Languages
  - Official: Tamil
- Time zone: UTC+5:30 (IST)

Alathur is a village in the Kudavasal taluk of Tiruvarur district, Tamil Nadu, India.

== Demographics ==
As per the 2001 census, Alathur had a total population of 1785 with 918 males and 872 females. The sex ratio was 955. The literacy rate was 79.58.
