= Kangalanchery =

Kangalanchery Kangalancheri
- Village
- Country: India
- State: Tamil Nadu

Government
  - Type: Panchayat

Languages
  - Official: Tamil
- Time zone: UTC+5:30 (IST)
- Postal code: 610101

Kangalanchery or Kangalancheri is a small village located near Thiruvarur Tamilnadu, India. It is located five kilometers from Thiruvarur town enroute to Mayiladuthurai. The village has gained popularity as of recent times, due to the presence of "Central University". Kangalancherry houses a post office of its own (PIN Code-610101). It also has a library, banks, ATM's, marriage halls. Kendriya Vidhyalaya school is located near Central University.

Kangalancherry is at the confluence of the Nagore - Kumbakonam highway and Thiruvarur -Mayiladuthurai highway. So it has gained popularity among the masses as a junction for shopping.

90% of population in Kangalancheri are following Hinduism while Christians and Muslims are minorities. 8 Hindu temples located in Kangalancheri (Vinayagar temple, Kathayi amman temple, Perumal temple, Thoondikaran temple, Angalamman temple) and prayer halls for Christians and Muslims.
