= Solapandi =

Solapandi (614016)

== Location ==
Solapandi is located in 7 km from Mannargudi on Muthupet State Highway.

== Temples ==
The Mariamman temple is situated at Middle Street. The deity in the temple includes Ramar Madam, Shivan, Bala Murgan and Vinayakar apart from Mazhai MariAmman. The Selliamman temple is situated at Kaddukakadu (Solapandi). The village believes that two ammans are sisters.

== Education ==
A private high school caters to the education up to 10th standard for the students of the village and surrounding areas namely Eathakudi, Thenpathi, Vadapathi and Thalayamangam. The school named after its founder Meenakshi Maariappar is located on the banks of Thiruthinan Kulam.

Another Matriculation school is situated in solapandi named as Krishna Matriculation School up to 5th standard

== Hang-outs ==
A Public Library is situated in the village. There is a post office.

== Economy ==
The economy of Solapandi relies heavily on farming. Farmers grow paddy mostly as Sambha crop which is 5 to 6 months old crop. Black gram, Green gram and gingelly are sown once paddy is harvested in the month of January. Most of farmers use canal irrigation system from Pamani river. Very few farmers have borewells in their farm and produce crops three times a year (kuruvai, taladi and kodai).

== Politics ==
Solapandi village comes under Thalayamangalam panchayat village which comprises 3 villages namely Thalayamangalam, Solapandi and Rajagopalapuram. The president of village is Mrs. Kalairani Balakrishnan (from 2020).

List of presidents

S No	Period	President	Party
01	1972-1985	V.Thangaraju Vandayar	CPM
02	1986-1991	G.Balasubramanian	DMK
03	1996-2001	Manimegalai Sadasivam	ADMK
04	2001-2006	Renganathan	Independent
05	2006-2011	Rajendran	DMK
06	2011-2016	Masilamani	Independent
07	2020 -	Kalairani Balakrishnan	DMK

== See also ==
Mannargudi
