= Kattimedu =

- village
- Location in Tamil Nadu, India
- Coordinates: 10.51°N 79.66°E
- Country: India
- State: Tamil Nadu
- District: Tiruvarur

Area
  - Total: 332.46 ha (821.5 acres)
  - Rank: first

Population (2011)
  - Total: 2,952
  - Density: 887.9/km^{2} (2,300/sq mi)

Languages
  - ENGLISH: Tamil
- Time zone: UTC+5:30 (IST)
- PIN: 614716
- Telephone code: 04369
- Vehicle registration: TN 50R

Kattimedu is a small village situated in Tiruvarur district of Tamil Nadu, India. It belongs to Kattimedu and Adirangam Panchayat.

== Demographics ==
In 2011, Kattimedu had a population of 2,952, with 737 households, and a sex ratio of 1,136 females per 1,000 males. That is higher than the average in Tamil Nadu, which is 996. For children, the sex ratio is 977, higher than the Tamil Nadu average of 943.

There were 348 children six and under, making up 11.79 % of the total population of village.

Kattimedu has higher literacy rate compared to Tamil Nadu. In 2011, literacy rate of Kattimedu village was 84.75 % compared to 80.09% of Tamil Nadu. Male literacy stands at 91.38 % while female literacy was 79.04 %.

Scheduled Castes make up 38.11% of the population in Kattimedu. No Scheduled Tribes live in the village.

== Governance ==
As per the constitution of India and the Panchyati Raaj Act, Kattimedu is administered by a Sarpanch who is an elected representative of village. The village is also designated a gram panchayat.

The village is represented by the Thiruthuraipoondi Vidhan Sabha constituency and the Nagapattinam Lok Sabha constituency.

== Geography ==
Kattimedu covers an area of 332.46 hectares. The village borders Thiruthuraipoondi, Adhirangam, and Kakalam. It is approximately 34 kilometres (21 mi) from the district headquarters in Thiruvarur.

The village has an Indian Overseas Bank location. There are five post offices found in the city. Public transit, such as buses or trains, can be found within the village.

Kattimedu has three schools, a primary school, a middle school, and a secondary school.
