= Jambuvanodai =

Coordinates: 10°24′N 79°32′E

- Village
- Interactive map of Jambuvanodai
- Country: India
- State: Tamil Nadu
- District: Thiruvarur

Government
  - Type: Panchayat

Languages
  - Official: Tamil
- Time zone: UTC+5:30 (IST)
- PIN: 614738
- Telephone code: 91 4369
- Vehicle registration: TN 50

Jambuvanodai is a village in Muthupettai taluk, Thiruvarur district, Tamil Nadu, India, near Muthupet. In 2011, the village had a population of 3,839.
