= Adiyakkamangalam =

Coordinates: 10.762611°N 79.677529°E

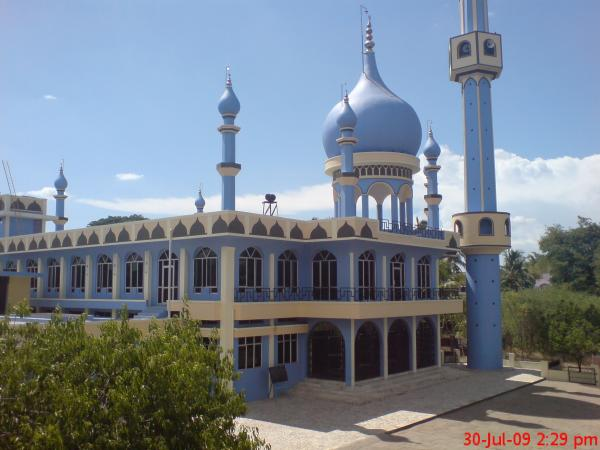
Adiyakkamangalam Mosque

Adiyakkamangalam is a village panchayat located in the south Indian state of Tamil Nadu. Located at 5 km from Tiruvarur (East), 15 km from Nagappattinam, it is on the east border of Tiruvarur district.

== Etymology ==
It is a home to many Sufis. The word "Adiyakkamangalam" stems from two words "Adiyaarku Mangalam (அடியார்க்கு மங்களம்)" meaning "Auspicious for the disciples" referring to the various Sufi saints entombed in this place.

Pin Code: 611101 STD Code: 04366 District: Thiruvarur
