= Kodikkalpalayam =

Village in Tamil Nadu, India

Kodikkalpalayam is a part of Thiruvarur Town, it comes Under the Ward no:7 and 8 partly 9 and 10 in Thiruvarur municipality. Tamil Nadu, India.
