= Thattathimoolai =

Thattathimoolai is a village 5 km (3.1 mi) from Nannilam taluk in Thiruvarur district, Tamil Nadu, India. It has five major temples: the Shiva temple, two Mariamman temples, the Ayyanar temple and the Perumal temple. The village was historically known as Thadakandapuram. The village houses 300 families, and is served by a bus service Bus No. 16 from Nannilam and Tiruvarur.
