= Poongulam =

Poongulam Poongulam None
- village
- Country: India
- State: Tamil Nadu
- District: Thiruvarur.

Population
  - Total: 2,000

Languages
  - Official: Tamil
- Time zone: UTC+5:30 (IST)
- PIN: 610107
- Telephone code: 04366
- Nearest city: Nannilam, Srivanjiyam, Kodavasal, Thiruvarur, Kumbakonam
- Lok Sabha constituency: Nannilam
- Climate: normally hot, pleasant during October to March (Köppen)

Poongulam is a village in Thiruvarur district in the Indian state of Tamil Nadu.

== Temples ==
It has four temples: Varasithi Vinayagar, Agastheeswarar (Shiva), Mariamman (Kali), and Ayyanar.

== Economy ==
Agriculture is the primary industry. Many workers left their farms to work in a neighboring village.

== Governance ==
The village is subject to Panchayat Veedthivedangan.
