= Annavasal, Pudukkottai =

Annavasal
- town panchayat
- Location in Tamil Nadu, India
- Coordinates: 10.4599°N 78.7022°E
- Country: India
- State: Tamil Nadu
- District: Pudukkottai
- Elevation: 142.5 m (468 ft)

Population (2001)
  - Total: 7,630

Languages
  - Official: Tamil
- Time zone: UTC+5:30 (IST)

Annavasal is a panchayat town in Pudukkottai district in the state of Tamil Nadu, India. Which is a part of Tiruchirapalli District before 14 January 1974 and merged with Pudukkottai district 14 January 1974. Annavasal is famous for jallikatu conduct at the month of February and weekly market

== Geography ==
Annavasal is located at 10.47°N 78.7°E. It has an average elevation of 128 metres (419 feet).

== Demographics ==
As of 2001 India census, Annavasal had a population of 7630. Males constitute 49% of the population and females 51%. Annavasal has an average literacy rate of 67%, higher than the national average of 59.5%; with 55% of the males and 45% of females literate. 12% of the population is under 6 years of age.

== Schools ==
- Infant Jesus Matriculation School
- Government Higher Secondary School
- Government Primary School
- Kokila Matriculation School (MSA Matriculation School)
- Government primary school-2 (segapattai)

== Hospitals ==
- Government Hospital
- Best Life Care
