= Koradacheri =

- Town panchayath
- Location in Tamil Nadu, India
- Coordinates: 10°46′N 79°29′E
- Country: India
- State: Tamil Nadu
- District: Thiruvarur

Population (2001)
  - Total: 5,970

Languages
  - Official: Tamil
- Time zone: UTC+5:30 (IST)

Koradacheri is a panchayat town in Thiruvarur district in the Indian state of Tamil Nadu. It lies between the rivers Vettar and Vennar flowing at a distance of about 1.5 km.

This is the Panchayat Town. Major income only from Agriculture, most of them are farmers. There are two government schools (Boys & Girls). There is a Railway station and a Government hospital.

== Demographics ==
As of 2001 India census, Koradacheri had a population of 5970. Males constitute 50% of the population and females 50%. Koradacheri has an average literacy rate of 75%, higher than the national average of 59.5%: male literacy is 81%, and female literacy is 69%. In Koradacheri, 11% of the population is under 6 years of age.

== Climate ==
Climate data for Koradacheri (1991–2020, extremes 1975–1999)
Month	Jan	Feb	Mar	Apr	May	Jun	Jul	Aug	Sep	Oct	Nov	Dec	Year
Record high °C (°F)	34.8 (94.6)	37.0 (98.6)	40.2 (104.4)	42.4 (108.3)	42.6 (108.7)	42.0 (107.6)	41.2 (106.2)	40.0 (104.0)	39.6 (103.3)	37.8 (100.0)	35.5 (95.9)	35.2 (95.4)	42.6 (108.7)
Mean daily maximum °C (°F)	30.6 (87.1)	33.2 (91.8)	36.0 (96.8)	38.1 (100.6)	38.8 (101.8)	37.5 (99.5)	35.9 (96.6)	36.1 (97.0)	35.6 (96.1)	33.5 (92.3)	30.3 (86.5)	29.0 (84.2)	34.4 (93.9)
Mean daily minimum °C (°F)	21.0 (69.8)	22.1 (71.8)	23.8 (74.8)	26.2 (79.2)	26.9 (80.4)	26.4 (79.5)	25.8 (78.4)	25.0 (77.0)	24.6 (76.3)	23.8 (74.8)	22.8 (73.0)	21.2 (70.2)	23.9 (75.0)
Record low °C (°F)	15.8 (60.4)	15.0 (59.0)	17.6 (63.7)	19.8 (67.6)	21.6 (70.9)	21.2 (70.2)	21.5 (70.7)	20.0 (68.0)	20.0 (68.0)	19.6 (67.3)	18.0 (64.4)	15.0 (59.0)	15.0 (59.0)
Average rainfall mm (inches)	24.0 (0.94)	8.7 (0.34)	1.6 (0.06)	16.0 (0.63)	52.5 (2.07)	43.4 (1.71)	63.6 (2.50)	74.5 (2.93)	85.1 (3.35)	138.6 (5.46)	285.7 (11.25)	228.2 (8.98)	1,022 (40.24)
Average rainy days	1.1	0.3	0.2	1.5	2.7	2.7	2.9	3.9	5.7	7.5	11.4	7.6	47.7
Average relative humidity (%) (at 17:30 IST)	76	63	58	53	55	54	57	57	63	72	82	83	65
Source: India Meteorological Department (humidity 1981-1999)
