= Nannilam =

- Neighbourhood
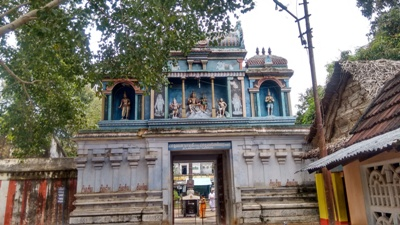
- Maduvanesvarar Temple

- Nannilam, Thiruvarur, Tamil Nadu, India
- Coordinates: 10.8802°N 79.6137°E
- Country: India
- State: Tamil Nadu
- District: Thiruvarur
- Taluka: Nannilam
- Elevation: 60 m (200 ft)

Population (2001)
  - Total: 9,880

Languages
  - Official: Tamil
- Time zone: UTC+5:30 (IST)
- PIN: 610105
- Vehicle registration: TN-50

Nannilam is a Town and Taluk in Thiruvarur District in the Indian state of Tamil Nadu. It is the headquarters town for Nannilam Taluk.

The town is a main hub for the nearby villages. Many of the population are farmers. Nannilam is located 30 km west of Karaikal and 30 km east of Kumbakonam. The people mainly depend on agriculture, almost 70% of the population are employed in agriculture.

Most of the villages developed along the river banks like saliperi village. The Tirumalarajanar River (a branch of Kaveri) flows in Nannilam taluk.

== Demographics ==
According to the 2001 Indian census, Nannilam then had a population of 9880. Males constitute 50% of the population and females 50%. Nannilam has an average literacy rate of 75%, higher than the national average of 59.5%: male literacy is 81%, and female literacy is 68%. 10% of the population is under 6 years of age.

== Politics ==
Nannilam assembly constituency (SC) is part of Nagapattinam (Lok Sabha constituency).

The Population density (people per km^{2}) of Nannilam assembly constituency is just 60 against India's 393.83 in 2010 (Just 15% of average India's Population density).

== Landmarks ==
Madhuvaneswarar Temple, an old Shiva temple which is located center of the town.

== Schools ==
- Vallalar Gurugulam Matric & Higher Secondary School, Nannilam.
- Guru Nursery and primary school, Nallamangudi, Nannliam.
- Ezhumalaiyan polytechnic at Kollumangudi
- Arooran Polytechnic at Sorakudi
- Central University of Tamilnadu at Neelakudy (Near kangalancherry), Tiruvarur District
- Tamil Nadu ITI at Vandampalai.
- Merit Higher Secondary School at Senthamangalam, Tiruvarur District
- Sankara Matriculation (CBSE Syllabus) School at Peralam
- Government Higher Secondary School and High School at Nannilam, Peralam, Poonthottam, Mudikondan, Srivanjiam
- George Higher Secondary School at Vishnupuram, Eravanchery, Nannilam Taluk
- Panchayat Union School at Kammangudi, Vadagudi (post), Nannilam Taluk
- Panchayat Union Primary School at Moolangudi, Anaikuppam (post), Nannilam Taluk
- Maha Jana Sabha govt aided elementary school established by Vadhyaar Somu Iyer, vadhyaar Venugopala ayyar and later succeeded by Sethurama Iyer.
- Thangam Nadunilai Palli, Nallamagudi.
- Panchayat Union Elementary School, Thirumaignanam-609403.
- Bharathidasan university near EB OFFICE Nannilam

== Notable people ==
- Kailasam Balachander, Tamil film director
- Piraisoodan, lyricist
- R. Madhi, cinematographer
- Nakkeeran, Writer.

== See also ==
- Poongulam
