= Tiruvarur district =

Thiruvarur district
- District of Tamil Nadu
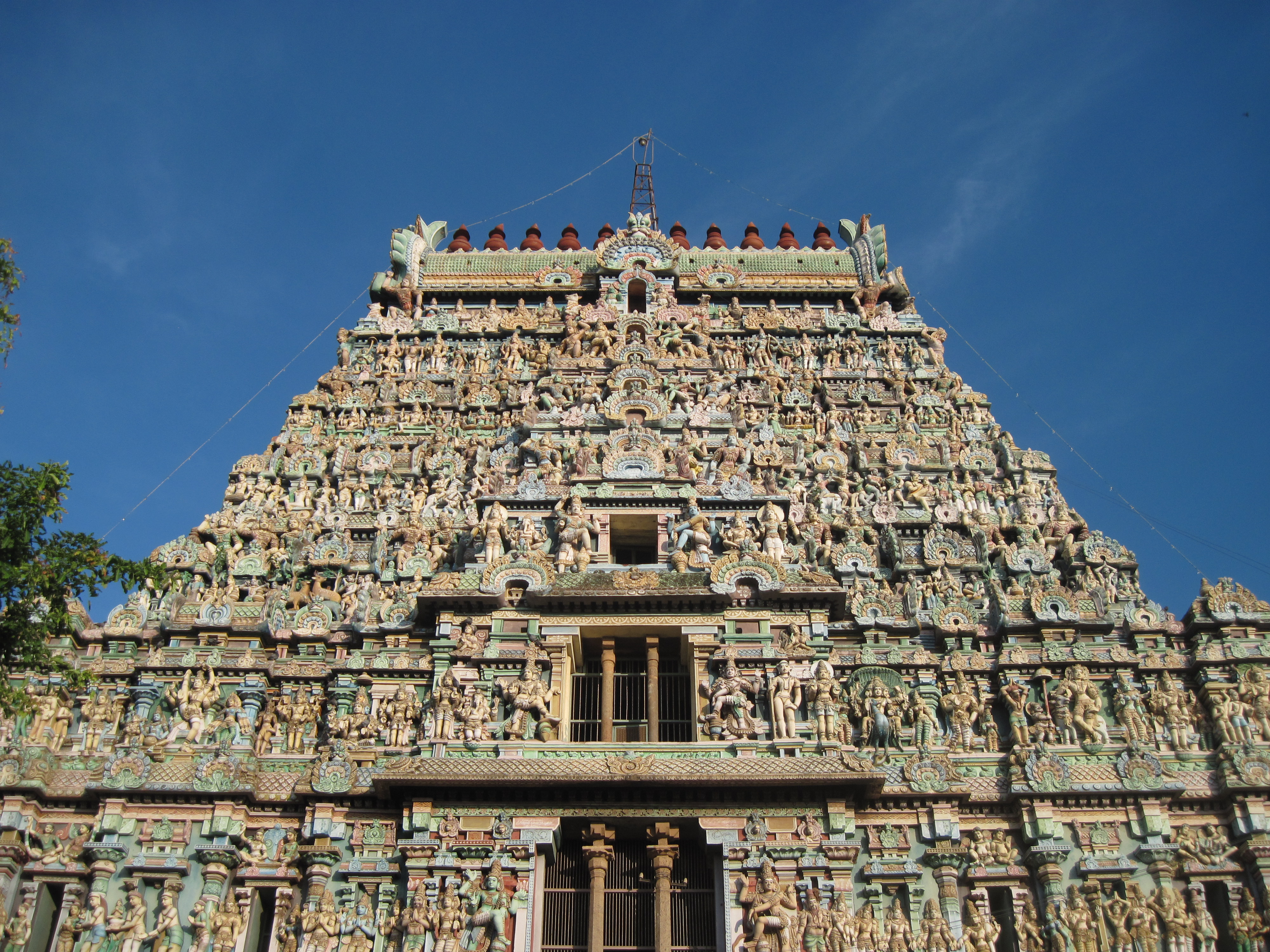
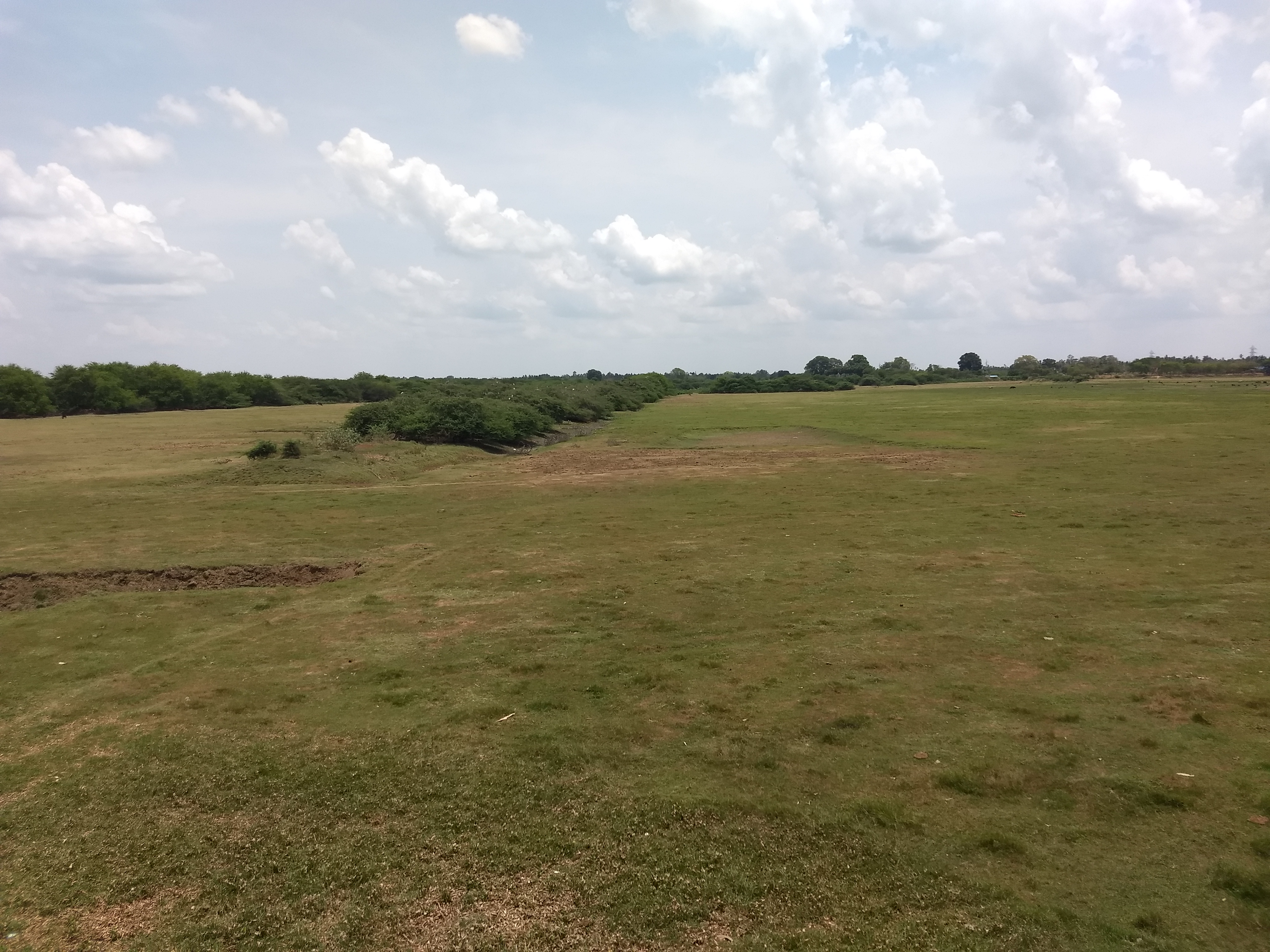
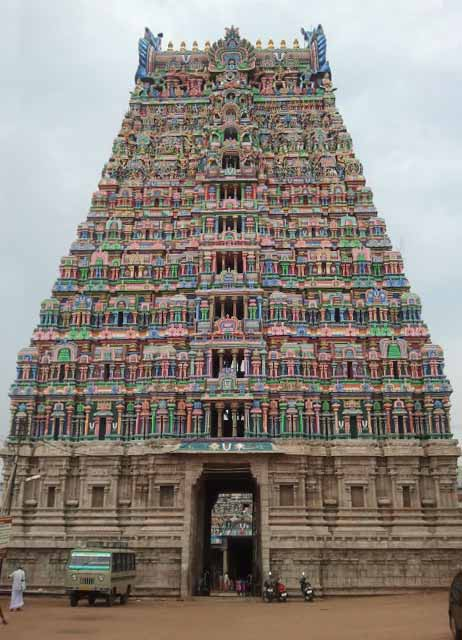
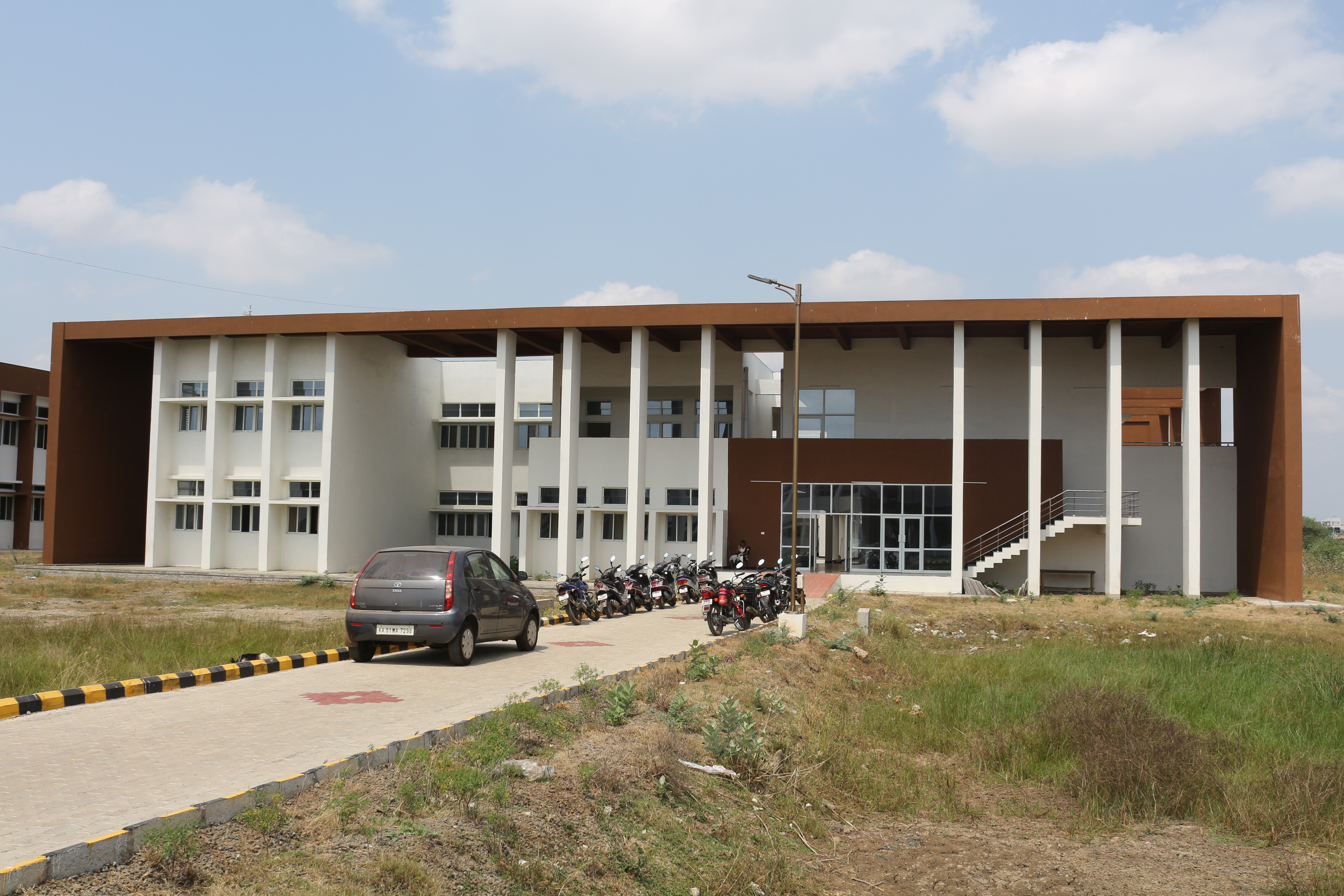
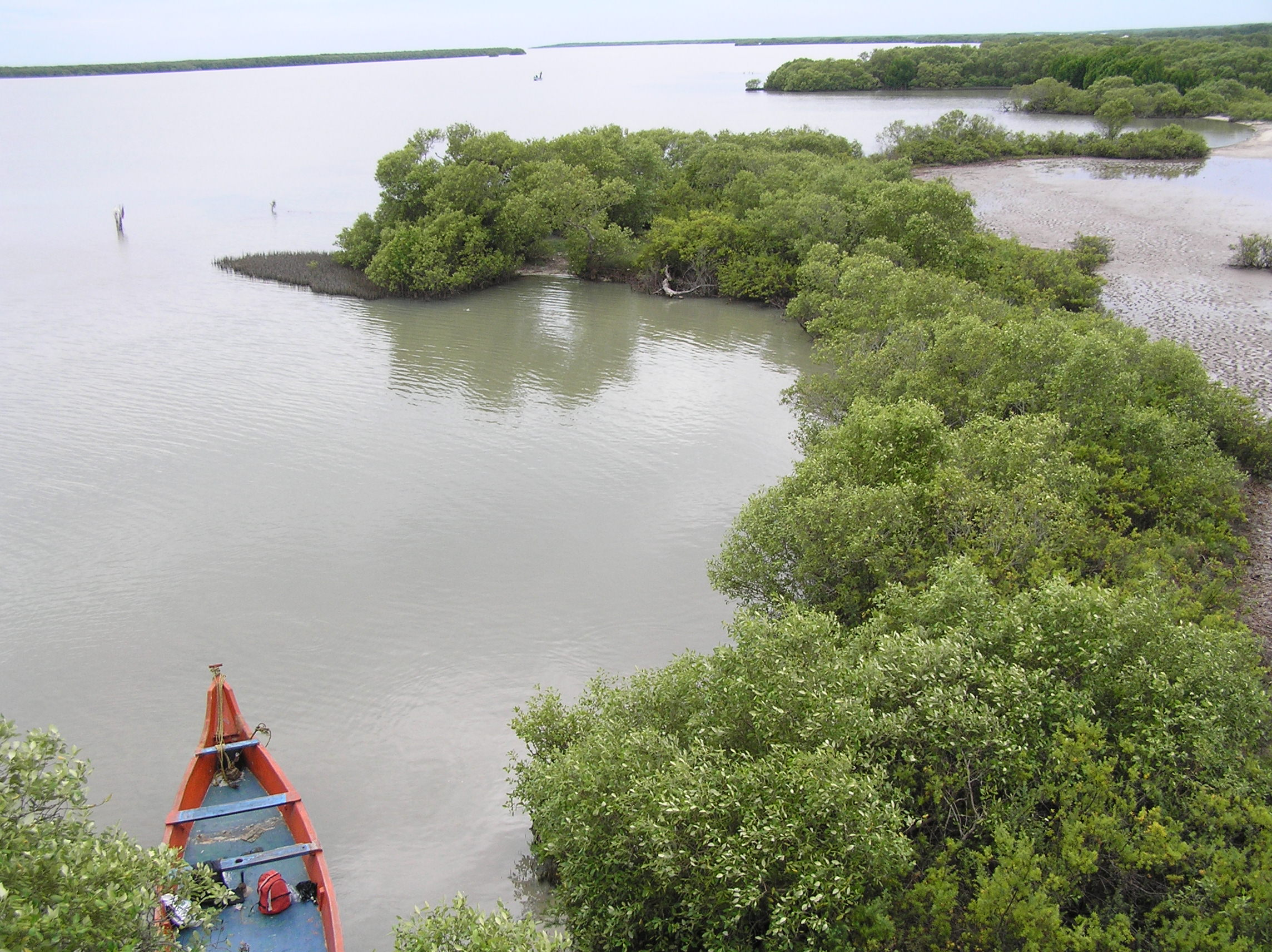
- Clockwise from top-left: Thyagaraja Temple in Thiruvarur, Vaduvoor Bird Sanctuary, Rajagopalaswamy Temple, Mannargudi, Mangroves in Muthupet Lagoon

- Location in Tamil Nadu
- Tiruvarur district
- Coordinates: 10°46′17.76″N 79°38′12.48″E
- Country: India
- State: Tamil Nadu
- Municipal Corporations: Thiruvarur, Mannargudi, Tiruthuraipoondi, Koothanallur
- Headquarters: Thiruvarur
- Talukas: Kudavasal, Mannargudi, Nannilam, Needamangalam, Thiruthuraipoondi, Thiruvarur, Valangaiman, Koothanallur. Muthupettai

Government
  - Collector: V.Mohanachandran I.A.S

Population (2011)
  - Total: 1,264,277

Languages
  - Official: Tamil
- Time zone: UTC+5:30 (IST)
- PIN: 610xxx
- Telephone code: 04366,04367
- Vehicle registration: TN-50(6 Taluks),TN-68(Valangaiman Taluk)"" TN-49""(Mutupetai Taluk)""
- Website: tiruvarur.nic.in

Thiruvarur district is one of the 38 districts in the Tamil Nadu state of India. As of 2011, the district had a population of 1,264,277 with a sex-ratio of 1,017 females for every 1,000 males.

== Geography ==
The district occupies an area of 2,161 km^{2}. The district is bounded by Nagapattinam district on the east, Mayiladuthurai district on the north, Thanjavur District on the west, Palk Strait on the south and a small border on the northeast with the Karaikal district of the union territory Puducherry.

== Demographics ==
Historical population
Year	Pop.	±% p.a.
1901	515,656	—
1911	543,671	+0.53%
1921	532,715	−0.20%
1931	547,925	+0.28%
1941	588,632	+0.72%
1951	682,392	+1.49%
1961	745,666	+0.89%
1971	869,636	+1.55%
1981	980,972	+1.21%
1991	1,100,096	+1.15%
2001	1,169,474	+0.61%
2011	1,264,277	+0.78%

Religions in Tiruvarur district (2011)
Religion	Percent
Hinduism	89.60%
Islam	7.60%
Christianity	2.63%
Other or not stated	0.17%

According to 2011 census, Thiruvarur district had a population of 1,264,277 with a sex-ratio of 1,017 females for every 1,000 males, much above the national average of 929. 20.39% of the population lived in urban areas. A total of 121,973 were under the age of six, constituting 62,280 males and 59,693 females. Scheduled Castes and Scheduled Tribes accounted for 34.08% and 0.24% of the population respectively. The average literacy of the district was 74.86%, compared to the national average of 72.99%. The district had a total of 327,219 households. There were a total of 540,168 workers, comprising 60,508 cultivators, 200,126 main agricultural labourers, 7,264 in house hold industries, 144,527 other workers, 127,743 marginal workers, 9,375 marginal cultivators, 95,062 marginal agricultural labourers, 3,176 marginal workers in household industries and 20,130 other marginal workers.

Tamil is the predominant language spoken by 99.40% of the population.

== History ==
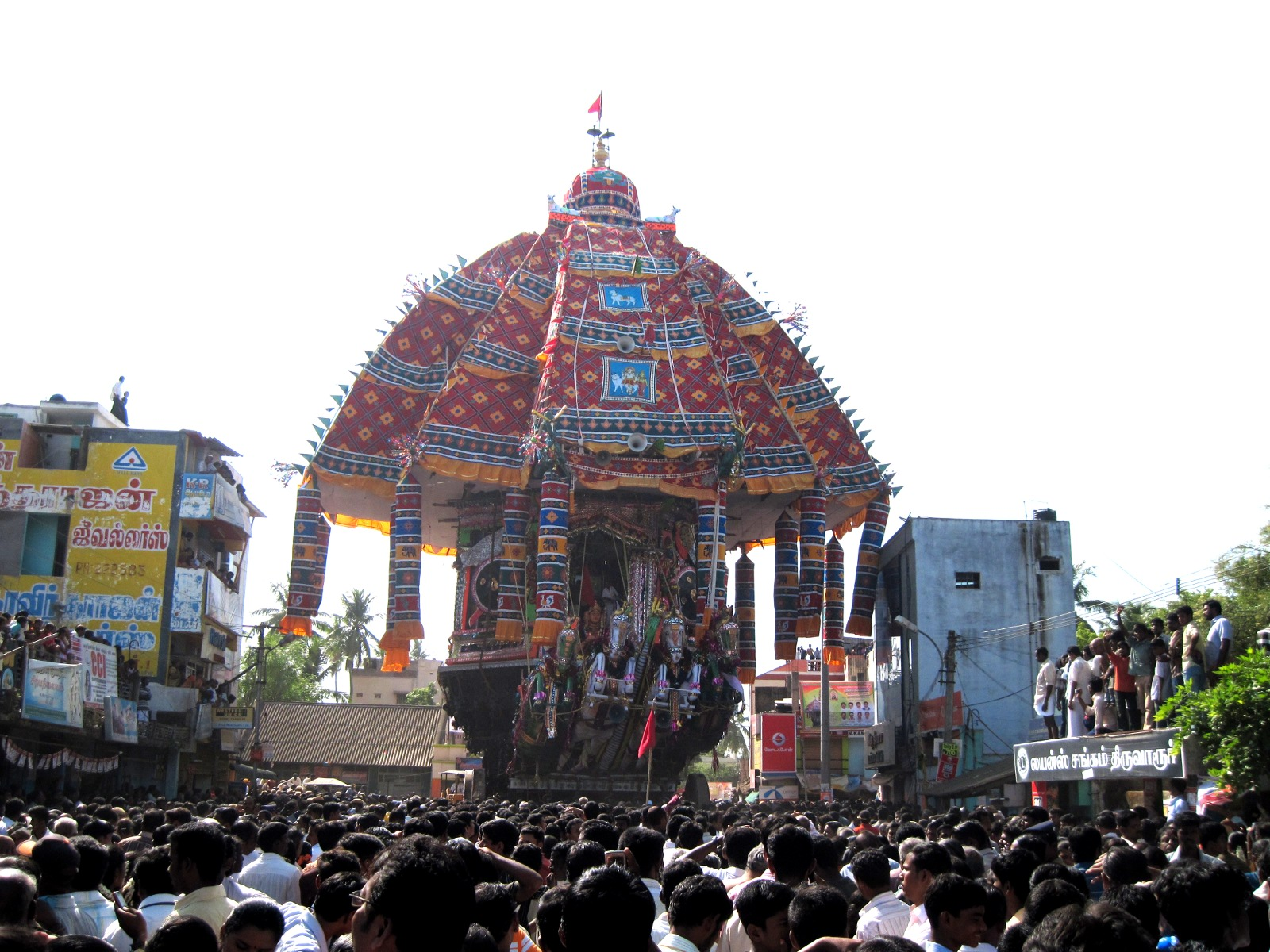
Thiruvarur temple car

The Thiruvarur district, along with the Nagapattinam district was part of the Thanjavur District before 1991. After that, the present Taluks of Thiruvarur district and Nagapattinam district were separated from the Thanjavur District, and formed the Nagapattinam district. The present Thiruvarur district was formed in 1997 by bifurcating the then Nagapattinam District and joined valangaiman taluk of thanjavur district. Major towns are:

- Thiruvarur
- Mannargudi
- Thiruthuraipoondi
- Koothanallur
- Kudavasal
- Needamangalam
- Muthupet

== Administration ==
Thiruvarur district is made up of Eight taluks:

- Kudavasal
- Mannargudi
- Nannilam
- Needamangalam
- Thiruthuraipoondi
- Thiruvarur
- Valangaiman
- Koothanallur
- Muthupet

=== Villages ===
Village	Taluk
Abivirutheeswaram	Kudavasal
Vilamal	Thiruvarur
Kattur	Thiruvarur
Manakkal	Thiruvarur
Thandalai	Thiruvarur
Achudamangalam	Nannilam
Adambar Ukkadai	Kudavasal
Adambar	Nannilam
Adambar	Nannilam
Adhanur	Needamangalam
Adichapuram	Mannargudi
Adippuliyur	Kudavasal
Adiyakkamangalam	
Agarathirumalam	Nannilam
Agarathirunallur	Kudavasal
Agaravelukudi	Needamangalam
Akkarai Kottagam	Mannargudi
Aladikaruppur	Kudavasal
Alangottai	Mannargudi
Alangudi	Nannilam
Alathur	Kudavasal
Alathur	Mannargudi
Alivalam	Tiruvarur
Ammaiyappan	Kudavasal
Anaikuppam	Nannilam
Anaivadapathi	Kudavasal
Annadanapuram	Nannilam
Annavasal	Kudavasal
Anniyur	Kudavasal
Arasavanangadu	Kudavasal
Aravathur	Mannargudi
Arpar	Kudavasal
Asesham	Mannargudi
Athicholamangalam	Kudavasal
Athikkadai	Mannargudi
Athikkottai (Thiruvarur)	
Athikottai	Mannargudi
Ayikkudi	Kudavasal
Ayyampettai	Nannilam
Deepangudi	Kudavasal
Devarkandanallur	Kudavasal
Elaiyur	Kudavasal
Elangarkudi	
Elavangargudi	Kudavasal
Engan	Kudavasal
Erukattur	Koothanallur
Jambuvanodai	Thiruthuraipoondi
Kadalangudi	Kudavasal
Kamalapuram	Kudavasal
Kamugakudi	Nannilam
Kamukakudi	Kudavasal
Kandiramanickkam	Kudavasal
Kangalanchery	
Kankoduthavanitham	Kudavasal
Kappanamangalam	Kudavasal
Karaiyappalaiyur	Kudavasal
Karuvakkurichi	
Karuvakkurichi	Mannargudi
Kattimedu	
Kattur	
Keelaperumalai
Keerangudi	Kudavasal
Killiyur	
Kodikkalpalayam	
Koothanur	
Kunniyur	Mannargudi
Lakshmangudi	Mannargudi
Manjakkudi	
Mela Amaravathi	
Melamaravakkadu	
Melathiruppalakudi	Mannargudi
Munnavalkottai	Needamangalam
Nachikulam	
Nedumbalam	
Pakkam Kottur	
Palayakkottai	Mannargudi
Paravakottai	Mannargudi
Paruthiyur	
Pillur	
Podakkudi	Koothanallur
Poongulam	
Poonthottam	Nannilam
Rettakudi	Nannilam
Saliperi	
Sannanallur	Nannilam
Semmangudi	Kodavasal
Sengalipuram	
Serugudi	Kudavasal
Sethanipuram	
Sirupuliyur	Nannilam
Sithamalli	
Solapandi	
Someswarapuram	Papanasam
Srivanchiyam	
Thappalampuliyur	
Thattathimoolai	
Thediyur	Kudavasal
Thirumakkottai	Mannargudi
Thirupampuram	Kudavasal
Thiruveezhimizhalai	Kudavasal
Ullikkottai	Mannargudi
Vadamattam	
Vaduvur	
Vangathangudi	
Budamangalam	Mannargudi
Nadappur	Thiruvarur Taluk
Keelathiruppalakudi	Mannargudi

== Politics ==
District	No.	Constituency	Name	Party	Alliance	Remarks
Tiruvarur	166	Thiruthuraipoondi (SC)	K. Marimuthu	CPI	LDF	Won as SPA candidate; party switched to TVK+ post-election; outside support to TVK government
Tiruvarur	167	Mannargudi	S. Kamaraj	AMMK	AIADMK+	
Tiruvarur	167	Mannargudi	S. Kamaraj	IND	TVK+	Outside support to TVK government; Expelled from AMMK
Tiruvarur	168	Thiruvarur	K. Poondi Kalaivanan	DMK	SPA	
Tiruvarur	169	Nannilam	R. Kamaraj	AIADMK	AIADMK+	Supported TVK; Later declared support for EPS

== Religion ==
- Nellivananathar Temple
- Rathnapureeswarar Temple
- Muthupet Dargah
- Vilvaranyeswarar Temple

== See also ==
- List of districts of Tamil Nadu
