= Tiruvarur taluk =

Tiruvarur Taluk (Thiruvarur Taluk) is a taluka in Thiruvarur district of the Indian state of Tamil Nadu. The headquarters of the taluk is the town of Tiruvarur.

In addition to the town of Tiruvarur there are thirty-four panchayat villages in Tiruvarur Taluk.

== Demographics ==
According to the 2011 census, the taluk of Thiruvarur had a population of 151,674 with 74,701 males and 76,973 females. There were 1,030 women for every 1,000 men. The taluk had a literacy rate of 79.25%. Child population in the age group below 6 years were 7,425 Males and 7,242 Females.

- Adiyakkamangalam
