= Needamangalam taluk =

Needamangalam Taluk (Nidamangalam Taluk) is a taluk in Thiruvarur district of the Indian state of Tamil Nadu. The headquarters of the taluk is the town of Needamangalam.

== History ==
The celebrated battle between the armies of Uthiyan Cheral Athan and Chozhan Karikaal VaLavan during the Sangam Age, c. 100 CE, was fought at Venni (Sangam poem: Purananuru-66) at the place where main Vennar river branches into three.

== Demographics ==
According to the 2011 census, the taluk of Needamangalam had a population of 147,451 with 72,695 males and 74,756 females. There were 1028 women for every 1000 men. The taluk had a literacy rate of 74.99. Child population in the age group below 6 was 6,869 males and 6,643 females.

== Geography ==
Needamangalam Taluk is crossed by the Vennar River in the north and the Korayar river in the south. Near the Bay of Bengal, the Venner River branches into three major distributaries, the northern branch retains its original name, Vennar. Other two branches are the Paminiyaar and the Koraiyar. They flow down to Muthupet Lagoon and from there join the sea.

== Cultural aspects ==
Needamangalam is notable for the temples located around it, these include: Kasi Viswanathar Temple, Santhana Ramaswamy Temple, Kogamugaeswarer Temple, Mariyamman Temple, Yamunambal Temple, Drowpathi Amman Temple, Iyyappan Temple, Bathrakaliamman Temple & Aangeneya Temple). the town also host a Christian church and a Mosque.

The town of Needamangalam is a main hub for the villagers of the taluk, the majority of whom are farmers. Back in the 1950s - 1970's the town served as a wholesale market for paddy crops, and other crops.

Many people originally from Needamangalam taluk now work in Gulf countries and United States.

== Scenic places ==
Three kilometres from the town of Needamangalam is a place that is called Munar Thalaippu, this is the picnic spot for the people living in Needamangalam.

== Notable people ==
- N. Gopalaswami, former Chief Election Commissioner of India.
