= Nannilam taluk =

Coordinates: 10°53′00″N 79°37′00″E

Nannilam taluk is a taluk in Thiruvarur district of the Indian state of Tamil Nadu. The headquarters of the taluk is the town of Nannilam.

== Demographics ==
According to the 2011 census, the taluk of Nannilam had a population of 137,743 with 69,110 males and 68,633 females. There were 993 women for every 1000 men. The taluk had a literacy rate of 77.25. Child population in the age group below 6 was 6,600 Males and 6,276 Females.
