= Mannargudi taluk =

Coordinates: 10.663°N 79.445°E

Mannargudi taluk is a taluk in Thiruvarur district of the Indian state of Tamil Nadu. The headquarters of the taluk is the town of Mannargudi.

== Demographics ==
According to the 2011 census, the taluk of Mannargudi had a population of 308,059 with 152,132 males and 155,927 females. There were 1025 women for every 1000 men. The taluk had a literacy rate of 75.15. Child population in the age group below 6 was 13,403 Males and 12,729 Females.
