= Kudavasal taluk =

Coordinates: 10°52′20″N 79°29′09″E

Kudavasal taluk is a taluk in Tiruvarur district of the Indian state of Tamil Nadu. The headquarters of the taluk is the town of Kudavasal.

== Demographics ==
As of 2011, Kudavasal taluk had a population of 205,625 people, of which 103,028 were female and 102,597 male, making the sex ratio 1,004 females to every 1,000 males. The taluk had a literacy rate of 75.78%. The population of children below 6 years old was 18,701, of which 9,454 were male and 9,247 female.
