= Bob-cut Sengamalam =

Temple elephant with hairstyle

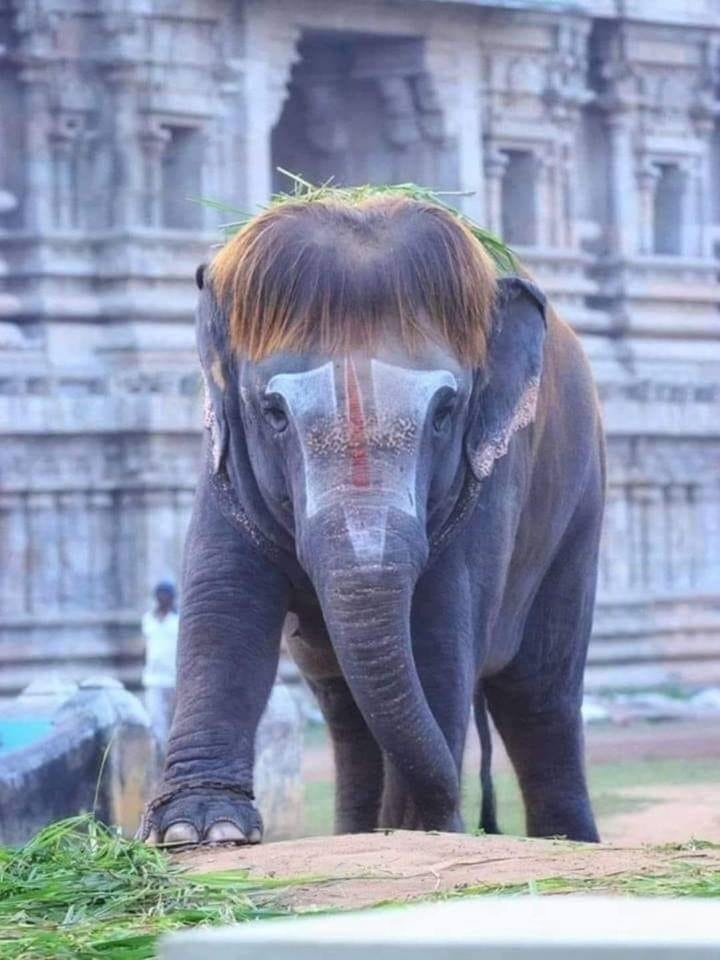
- Sengamalam with her bob-cut hairstyle
- Species: Elephas maximus (Asian Elephant)
- Sex: Female
- Born: c. 1988 (age approx. 38); Likely Assam, India
- Nationality: India
- Known for: Bob cut hairstyle, Mannargudi Temple Elephant
- Owner: Mannargudi Rajagopalaswamy Temple

Sengamalam is a female temple elephant of the Rajagopalaswamy Temple in Mannargudi, Tamil Nadu, India. She is well known for her distinctive bob-cut hairstyle, which has attracted media and public attention. Sengamalam regularly participates in the temple's daily rituals and major festivals, including the annual Brahmotsavam and Theppotsavam.

== Background ==
Sengamalam was brought to the Rajagopalaswamy Temple from Kerala on January 13, 2003, though Sengamalam had been brought from Assam beforehand. She has become an important part of temple activities such as daily rituals, processions and annual festivals like Brahmotsavam and helps accompany the deities in festivals.

== Hairstyle and care ==
Sengamalam became an internet sensation because of her eclectic style bangs (bob cut). Her mahout S. Rajagopal, who maintained her, got the inspiration from watching a video of an elephant with similar hairstyle and replicate the same for her with permission. Her hair needs constant attention, as its washed 3 times a day in the summer, and at least once a day in other seasons. A special shower was installed that worth ₹45,000 to help keep her cool in the heat.

== Public recognition ==
Sengamalam’s hairstyle has gained a lot of attention, with videos and pictures shared widely on social media. In 2020, her images circulated again, making her one of the most recognizable temple elephants online. Social media users frequently compared her look to a professionally styled human haircut. Her devoted followers and even critics often called her a “high-maintenance queen” and noted her one-of-a-kind fashion. Sengamalam's looks have been showcased in local and national television, as well as in publications related to temples. She is celebrated as a cultural icon and a mark of devotion, and her prominence extends to the devotees coming to Mannargudi. Sengamalam is also special for her unique talent of playing mondhar, the mouth organ, to greet the visitors, and has become quite popular.

== Cultural role ==
Beyond her internet fame, Sengamalam remains an important part of temple life. She takes part in religious processions, blesses devotees, and the local community views her as both a sacred presence and a cultural icon.

== See also ==
- Rajagopalaswamy Temple, Mannargudi
- Temple elephant
