= Vaduvoor Bird Sanctuary =

Sanctuary in India

- IUCN category IV (habitat/species management area)
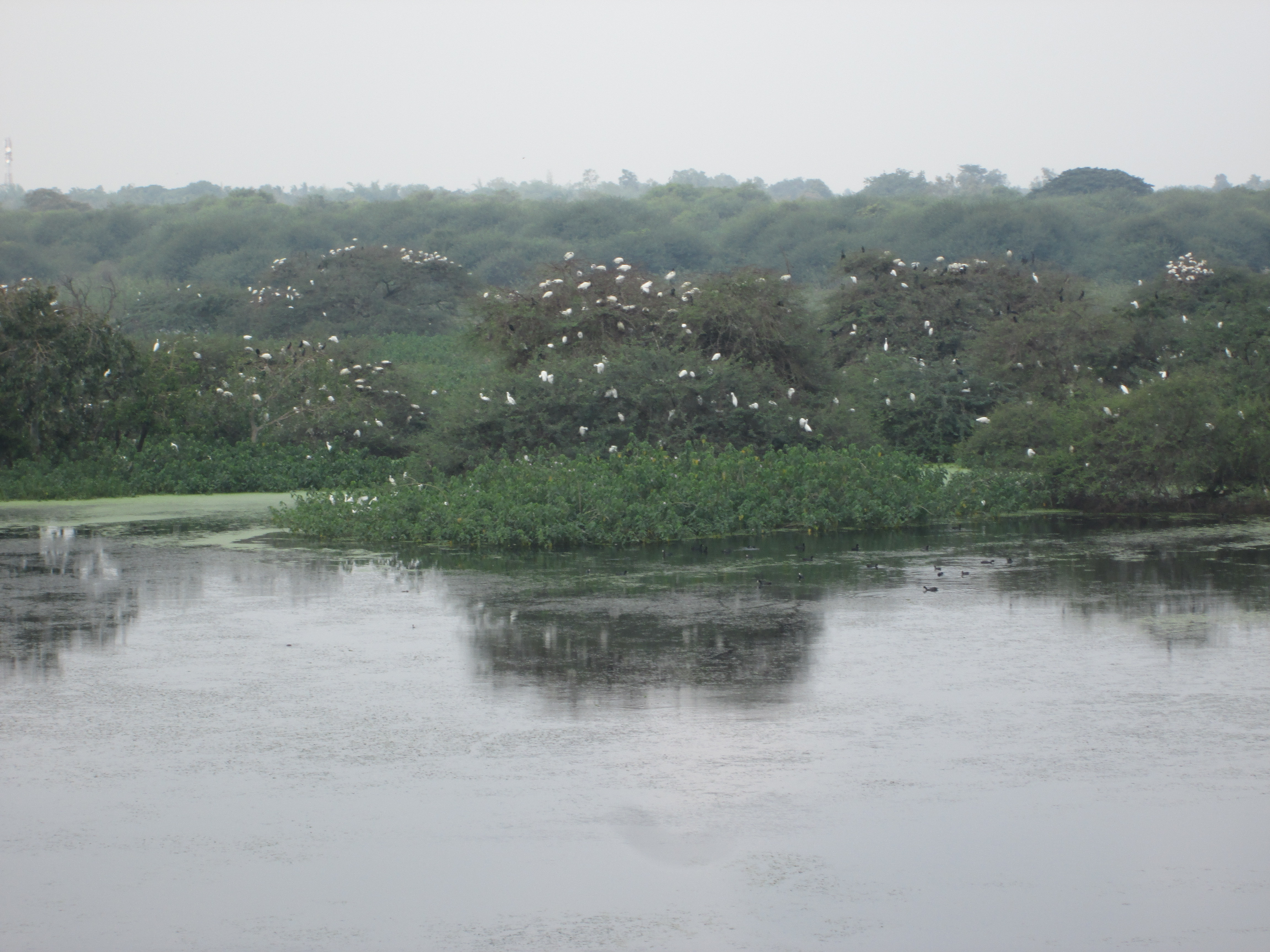
- A group of birds seen at their nest in the tree

- Location within Tamil Nadu Location within India
- Interactive map of Vaduvoor Bird Sanctuary
- Location: Tamil Nadu, India
- Nearest city: Thanjavur
- Coordinates: 10.698943°N 79.322469°E
- Established: 1999

Ramsar Wetland
- Official name: Vaduvur Bird Sanctuary
- Designated: 8 April 2022
- Reference no.: 2493

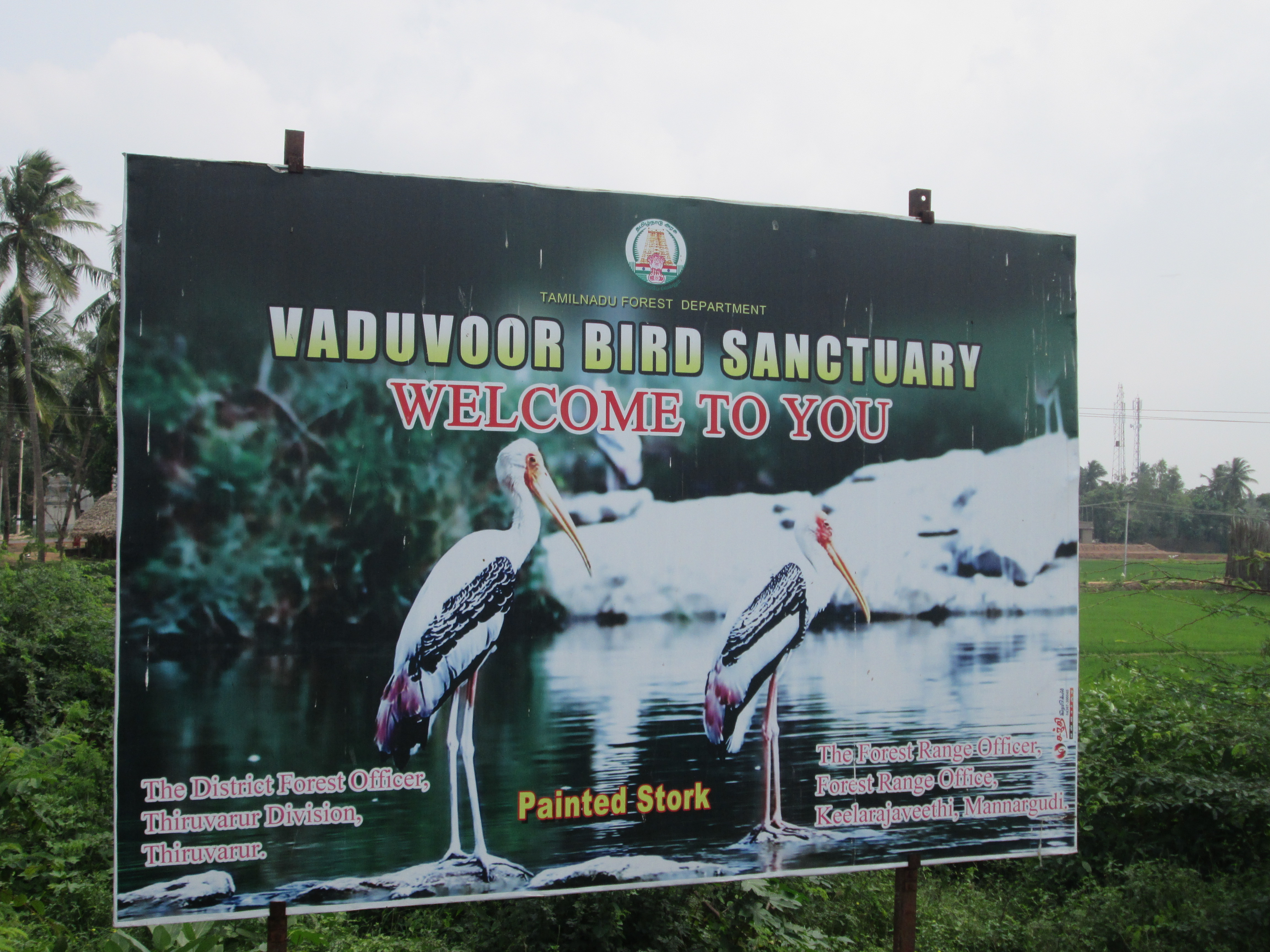
Welcome sign for visitors

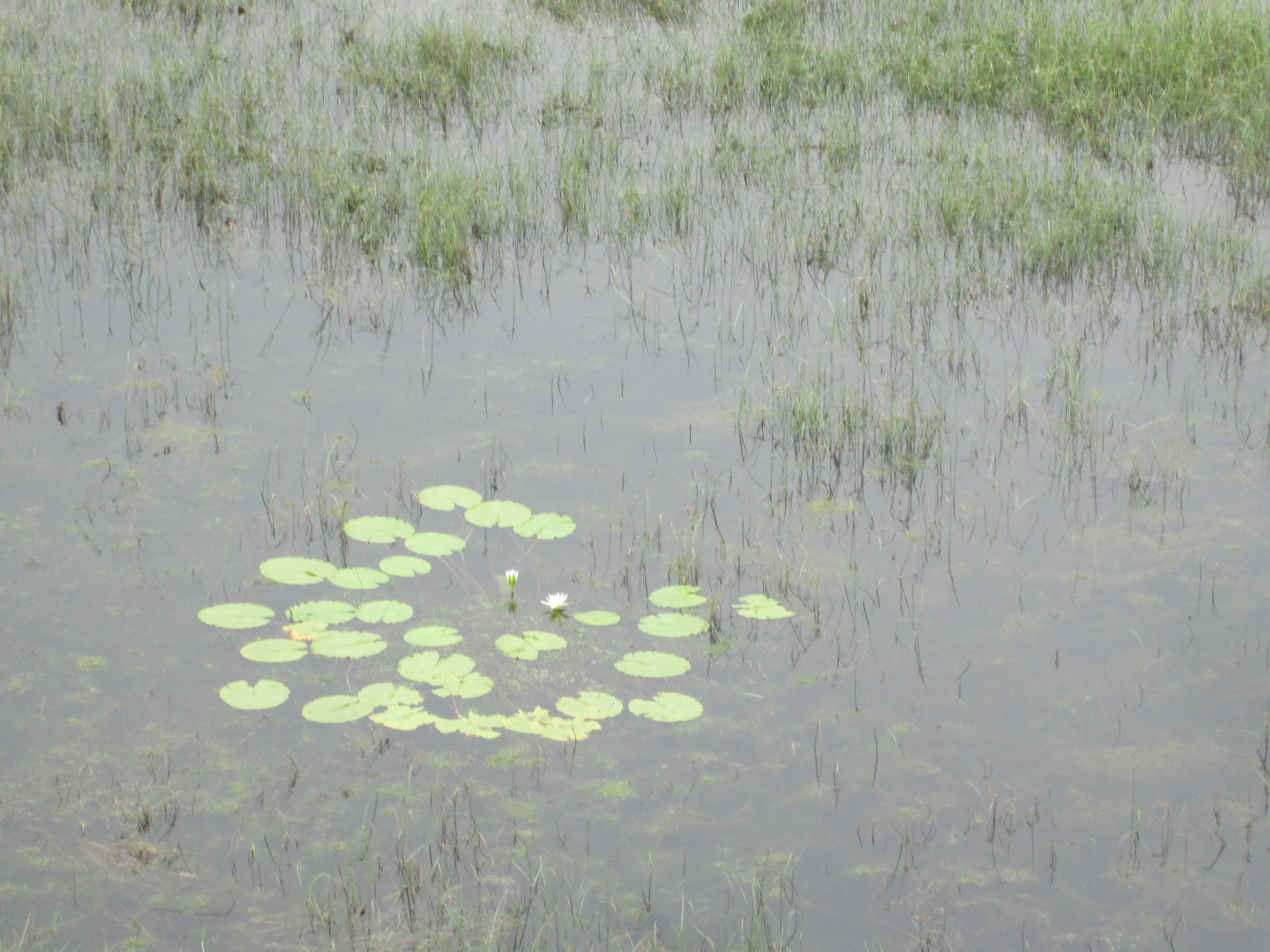
Irrigation pond with lotus flowers

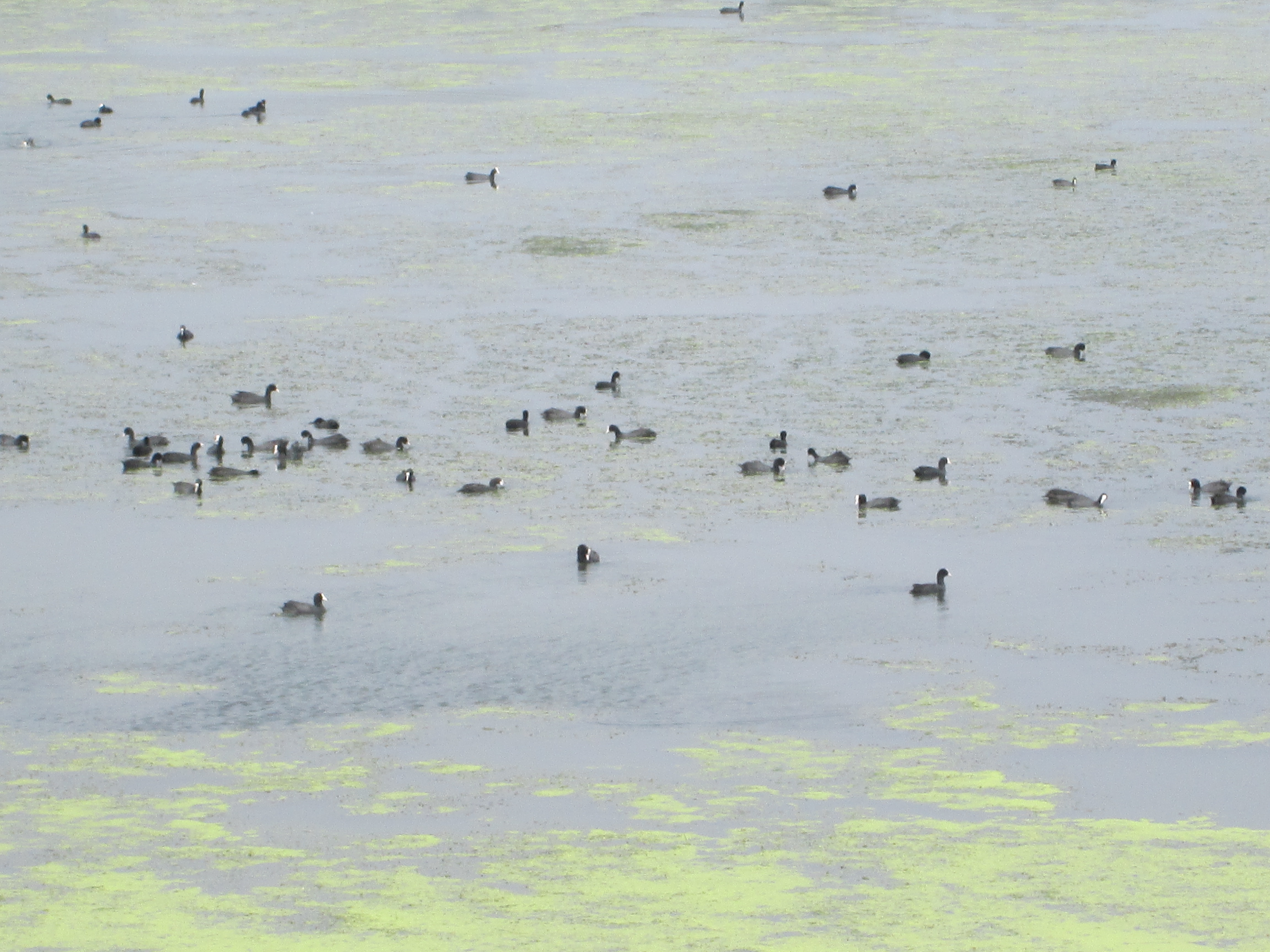
A huge group of birds in a pond

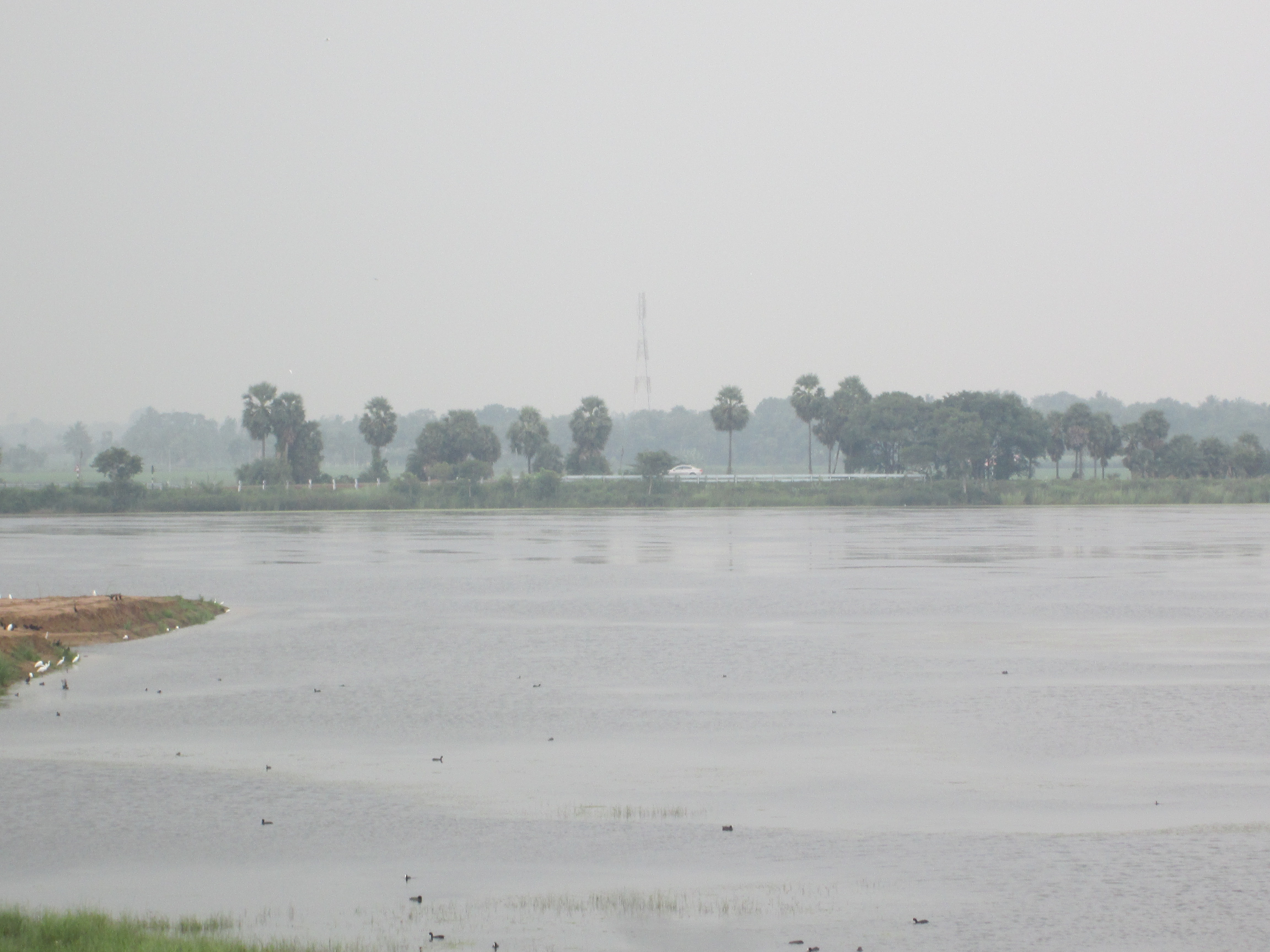
Thanjavur-Mannargudi state highway, seen from the sanctuary

Vaduvoor Bird Sanctuary is a 128.10-hectare area located in Vaduvoor lake, Mannargudi Taluk, Thiruvarur District, Tamil Nadu, India. The sanctuary is about 25 kilometers from Thanjavur and 14 kilometers from Mannargudi on the Thanjavur-Kodiakkarai State Highway 63. It was created in 1999.

The irrigation tank receives water from November to April every year which attracts numerous foreign birds from Europe and America. The sanctuary attracts more than 40 species of water birds like the white ibis, painted stork, grey pelican, pintail, cormorant, teal, heron, spoonbills, darter, coot, open bill stork, and pheasant–tailed jacana. The sanctuary is a favorite spot for migratory birds, and during the months of November and December more than 20,000 winged visitors reach this area. The sanctuary has basic facilities for tourists to stay overnight and enjoy watching the birds from the two watch towers.

Bird migration is a seasonal phenomenon. When the temperature escalates in Europe and in the North America, the birds move to more favourable climes. The wetlands in this region are quite suitable for the migratory birds as they provide suitable environment for food, shelter and reproduction. The farmers of this region also love the arrival of migratory birds, as the irrigation water becomes fertile once it is enriched with the excretion of the birds.

The state government has appointed officers for prevention of both hunting and poaching. Poaching and hunting is illegal and is a punishable offence. The villagers are aware of this and a friendly environment for the shelter of the birds prevails. The small town is a good agricultural land and rice is grown in plenty.

== History ==
The Vaduvoor Birds Sanctuary was created in 1999. The sanctuary was designated as a protected Ramsar site in 2022.

== Bird species ==
The Vaduvoor Bird Sanctuary attracts more than 40 species of water birds like white ibises, painted storks, grey pelicans, pintails, cormorants, teals, herons, spoonbills, darters, coots, open bill storks, and pheasant tailed jacanas. The sanctuary is a favorite spot for migratory birds during the months of November and December. More than 2000 winged visitors reach this area.

== Location ==
The Vaduvoor Bird sanctuary is located in the Vaduvoor Lake, which is 25 km from Thanjavur and 14 km from Mannargudi on the Thanjavur-Kodiakkarai State Highway 63.

== Climate ==
Climate data for Vaduvoor
Month	Jan	Feb	Mar	Apr	May	Jun	Jul	Aug	Sep	Oct	Nov	Dec	Year
Mean daily maximum °C (°F)	21.0 (69.8)	25.0 (77.0)	32.0 (89.6)	38.0 (100.4)	42.0 (107.6)	42.0 (107.6)	37.0 (98.6)	35.0 (95.0)	35.0 (95.0)	34.0 (93.2)	29.0 (84.2)	23.0 (73.4)	32.8 (91.0)
Mean daily minimum °C (°F)	09.0 (48.2)	11.0 (51.8)	17.0 (62.6)	23.0 (73.4)	29.0 (84.2)	31.0 (87.8)	29.0 (84.2)	28.0 (82.4)	26.0 (78.8)	23.0 (73.4)	18.0 (64.4)	12.0 (53.6)	21.3 (70.4)
Average precipitation mm (inches)	7.0 (0.28)	13.0 (0.51)	7.0 (0.28)	6.0 (0.24)	5.0 (0.20)	20.0 (0.79)	66.0 (2.60)	66.0 (2.60)	53.0 (2.09)	2.0 (0.08)	1.0 (0.04)	2.0 (0.08)	248 (9.8)
Source: Best time to visit, weather and climate Vaduvoor

== Transport ==
By road

- Buses are available 24x7 from both Thanjavur and Mannargudi.

By train

- The nearest railway stations are Thanjavur Junction railway station and Mannargudi railway station.

By air

- The nearest international airport from Vaduvoor is Tiruchirapalli International Airport, Tamil Nadu, roughly two hours' drive from Vaduvoor (85 km). It is well connected to a spectrum of cities in India and abroad such as Bangalore, Chennai, Singapore, and Malaysia.

== Nearby places ==
- Kothandaramaswamy temple, Vaduvur
- Brihadisvara Temple, Thanjavur
- Rajagopalaswamy Temple, Mannargudi
- Muthupet mangroves and lagoon

== See also ==
- List of birds of South India
- List of birds of Tamil Nadu
- List of wildlife sanctuaries of India
