= Thirumakkottai =

Village in Tamil Nadu, India

Thirumakkottai Temple Village
- Village
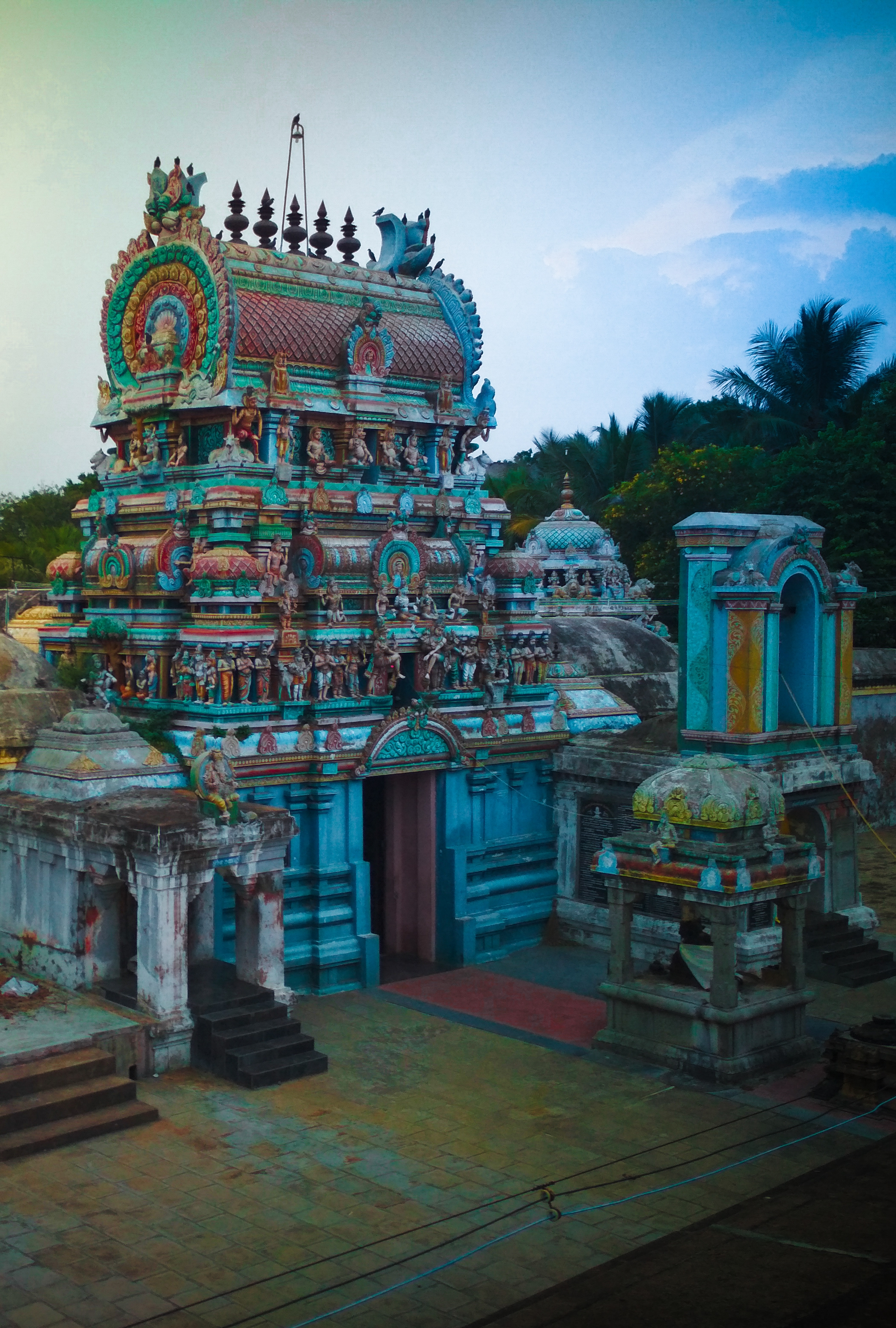
- 1000-year-old Gnanapureeshwar Temple Thirumakkottai.
- Nickname: Thirumai
- Location in Tamil Nadu, India Thirumakkottai (India)
- Coordinates: 10.52°N 79.43°E
- Country: India
- State: Tamil Nadu
- District: Thiruvarur
- Taluk: Mannargudi
- Region: Chola Nadu

Government
  - Body: Department of Hindu religious and endowment board
- Elevation: 6 m (20 ft)

Population (2011)
  - Total: 4,770

Languages
  - Official: Tamil
- Time zone: UTC+5:30 (IST)
- PIN: 614017
- Telephone code: 04367
- Vehicle registration: TN 50

Thirumakkottai (Thirumai ) ( Birth name Thirumeignanapuram ) is a village in Mannargudi municipality in Thiruvarur district (formerly part of Thanjavur district) in the Indian state of Tamil Nadu. The village is Thirumakkottai consist of many streets like North street, South street, Bazaar Street, New street, Sivan koil street, Ponniyamman Temple Street, Theradi street, Nallan Pillai street.

== Geography ==
Thirumakkottai has an average elevation of 6 metres (19 feet).

== Economy ==
As an agricultural village, Thirumakkottai's economy largely depends on the income from agriculture. The crops cultivated include rice, cotton, sugarcane, and pulses like urad and mung bean. The agriculture around this area mainly depends on the rivers Koraiyaru, Mullaiyar, and Pamaniyar. Other sources of irrigation are bore-wells.

There is a Gas Turbine power plant in this village, which supplies electricity to nearby districts.

== Temples ==
The place was once a forest of Paarijatha trees, which are endemic plants having sweet-smelling flowers.

This village is surrounded with temples and tanks. One important temple is Sree Gnanapureeshwarar temple, which is a vast temple complex with a more than 1000-year-old history. "Gnanapureeshwar" is a word dedicated to Lord Siva. Thirikulam, a tank situated opposite to this temple, is famous for curing Ven Kushtam, i.e. white leprosy.

The temple was built by the Chola King Kiruthasekaran, as per inscription in temple wall it appears to be more than 1000 years old. This place is known by many names such as Gnanapureesuram, Pachima (west) Parijatha Vanam, Thirumeignaanapuram, Thirumelkottai Mahanam, and Thirumakkottai. He kept Thirumakkottai as his capital. The famous of this temple is the deity is surrounded by 16 Vinayagar (Pillaiyar) in different locations and positions. This is the only place in the world where such a divine setup is established. This village is related to the history of Ramayana. History says that Sri Rama visited this village to meet his guru (master) Rishi Vasistha while travelling to Lanka to get Sita back.

Other than this Siva temple, another big and famous temple is Perumal Kovil and the main deity is Renganathar with his concert Renganayagi thayar. In addition there are a lot of village goddess temples like Maariyamman temple, Ponniyamman temple, Veeranar Temple and Adaikkalakatthar Temple.

This village is literally called the Temple Village

== Demographics ==
=== Thirumakkottai -I ===
Thirumakkottai -I is a large village located in Mannargudi Taluka of Thiruvarur district, Tamil Nadu with total 548 families residing. The Thirumakkottai -I village has population of 2075 of which 1027 are males while 1048 are females as per Population Census 2011.

In Thirumakkottai -I village population of children with age 0-6 is 218 which makes up 10.51% of total population of village. Average Sex Ratio of Thirumakkottai -I village is 1020 which is higher than Tamil Nadu state average of 996. Child Sex Ratio for the Thirumakkottai -I as per census is 847, lower than Tamil Nadu average of 943.

Thirumakkottai -I village has lower literacy rate compared to Tamil Nadu. In 2011, literacy rate of Thirumakkottai -I village was 76.41% compared to 80.09% of Tamil Nadu. In Thirumakkottai -I Male literacy stands at 82.95% while female literacy rate was 70.15%.

=== Thirumakkottai - II ===
Thirumakkottai - II is a large village located in Mannargudi Taluka of Thiruvarur district, Tamil Nadu with total 675 families residing. The Thirumakkottai - II village has population of 2695 of which 1301 are males while 1394 are females as per Population Census 2011.

In Thirumakkottai - II village population of children with age 0-6 is 250 which makes up 9.28% of total population of village. Average Sex Ratio of Thirumakkottai - II village is 1071 which is higher than Tamil Nadu state average of 996. Child Sex Ratio for the Thirumakkottai - II as per census is 938, lower than Tamil Nadu average of 943.

Thirumakkottai - II village has higher literacy rate compared to Tamil Nadu. In 2011, literacy rate of Thirumakkottai - II village was 80.78% compared to 80.09% of Tamil Nadu. In Thirumakkottai - II Male literacy stands at 87.54% while female literacy rate was 74.55%.

==== Thirumakkottai Panchayat ====
The entire village belongs to one community, and all of them are relatives. In the adjacent area of Maharajapuram, Perumal Kovil Natham, Thirumani eri and Karuppayi Thoppu (both places fall under Thirumakkottai Panchayat). Later, Muslims migrated to this village for doing trade. Their population is now considerably increased and they are spread over the bazaar area. The bazaar mainly deals with consumer durable businesses, but most people prepare to visit nearby town Mannargudi or Pattukottai.

It is a self-contained village, because apart from Agamudaiyar Thevar, goldsmiths, barbers, nathaswaram vidhuvans, Schedule Caste, laborers, and dobbys, are also living to fulfill the day today requirements.

The village has a well organized Grama Sabha Committee. It maintains the property belonging to the village and takes care of development of the village.

== School ==
There are two type of schools in this village. For 1 to 5th standard, Panchayat Union Elementary School, Udhayam primary school And for 6 to 12th standard and also Government Higher Secondary School's ( Not co-education separate Boys and girls school ) is located in Main Road Thirumakkottai.

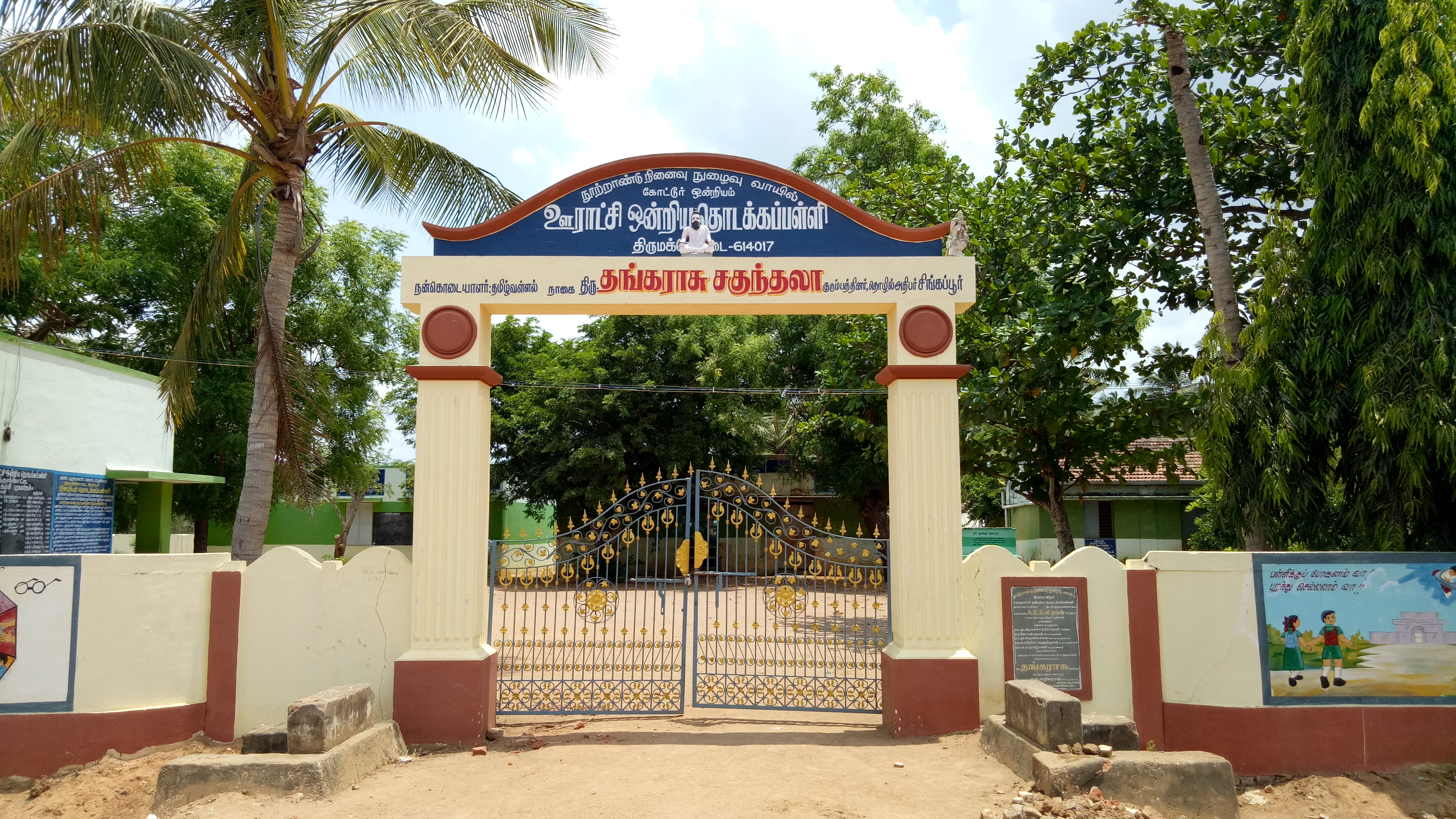
1 to 5th standard, Panchayat Union Elementary School, Thirumakkottai

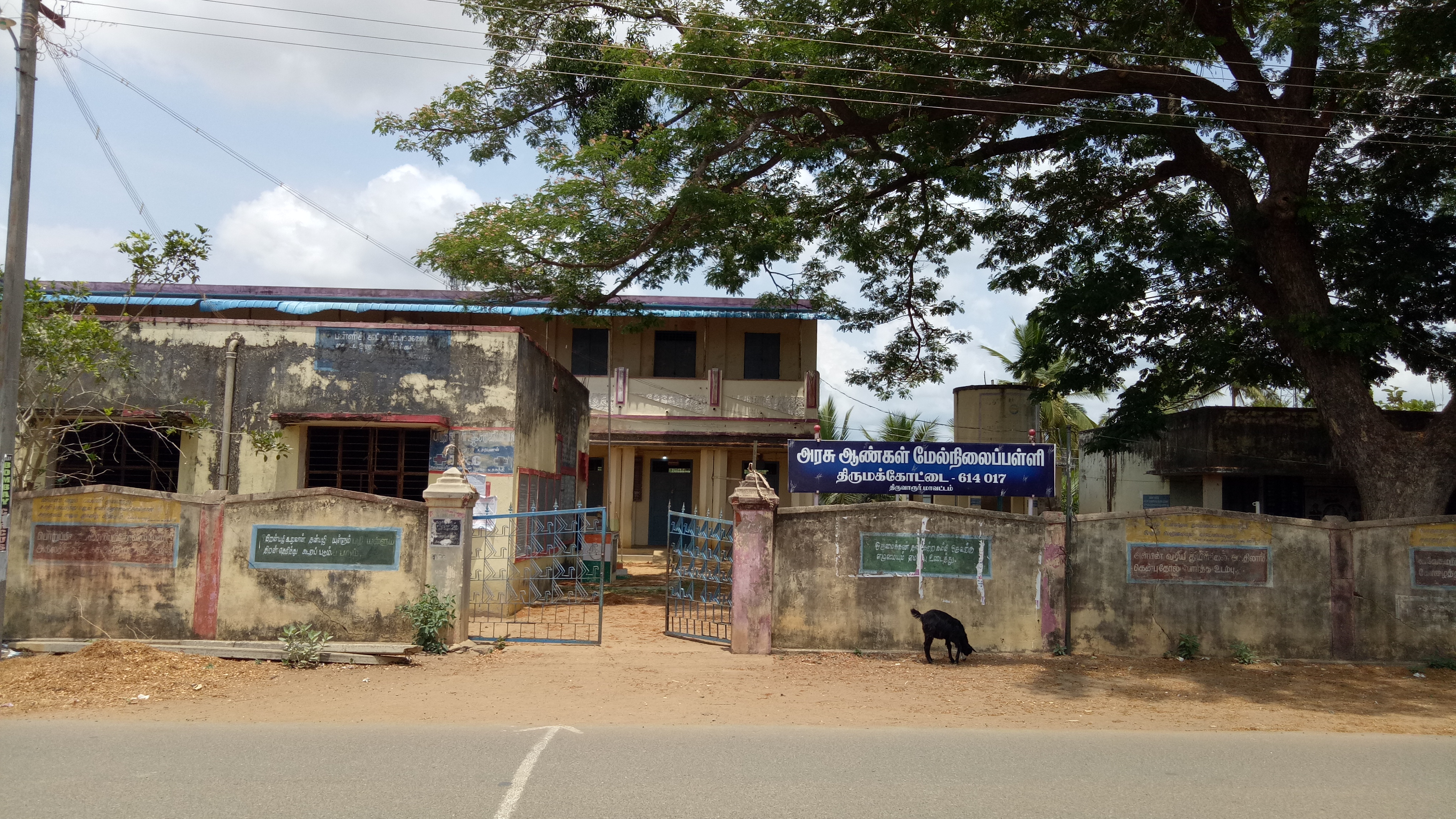
Government Boys Higher Secondary School is located in Main Road Thirumakkottai.

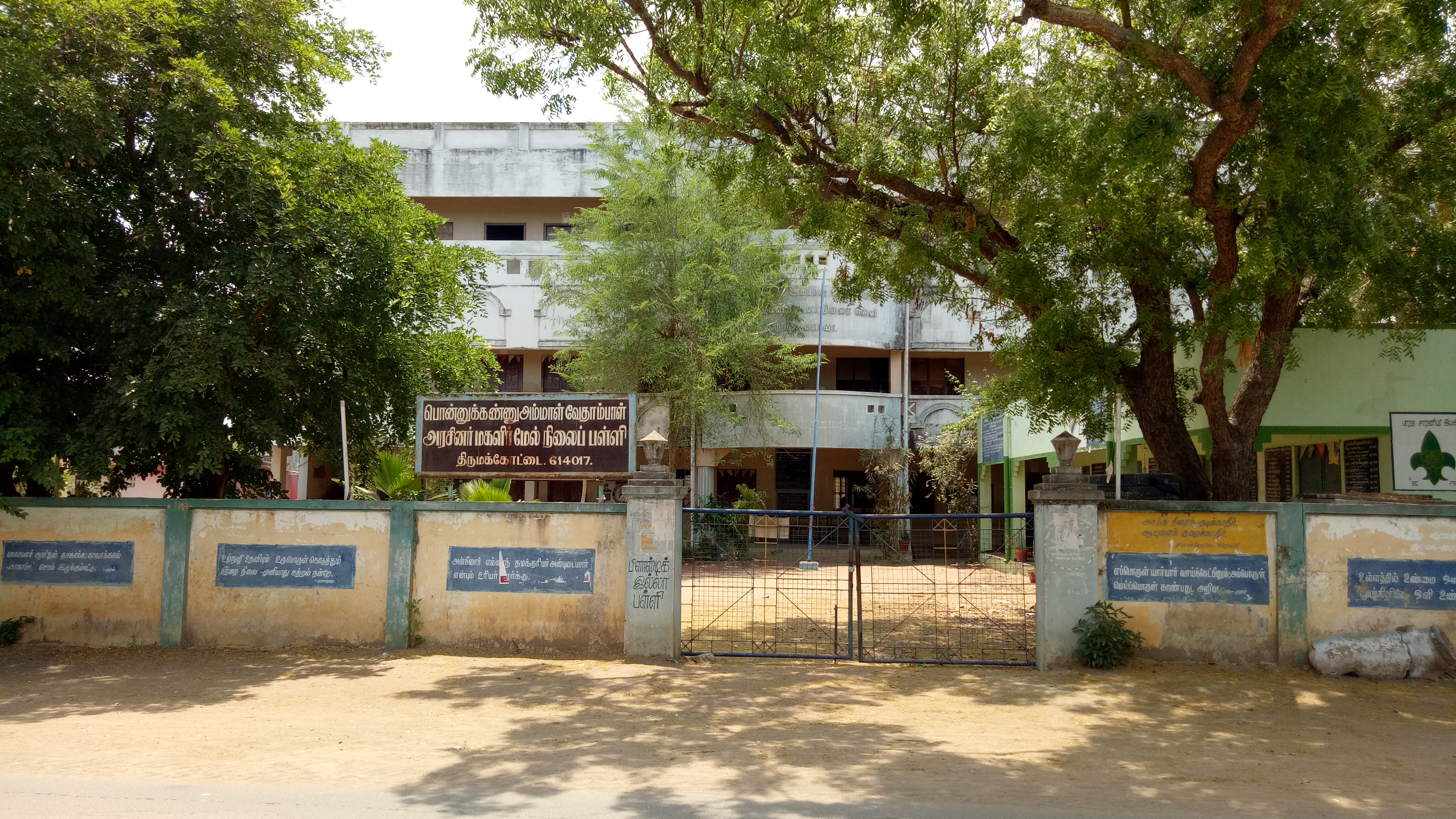
Government girls Higher Secondary School is located in Main Road Thirumakkottai.

== Diaspora ==
Thirumakkottai earns a large amount of foreign money through its globally spread out community. Most families have at least one member working abroad. Most of them are in Singapore, fewer people live in America, Canada, London, Malaysia, Australia, Saudi Arabia, Dubai and Kuwait.

== Bank's ==
Indian overseas Bank and City Union Bank is located in this village. The Bank have attached ATM Center And this place has a private ATM.

== Education ==
ARJ engineering college is situated around 10 km from Thirumakkottai on the road to Mannargudi. STET women's college is nearby, where students from nearby towns study.

ARJ engineering college group has started the ARJ polytechnic college.

Government schools in primary and higher secondary levels, and one women's school, are available in this village. More than 1000 students from in and around this village attend them.

== Power plant ==
A gas turbine power plant is commissioned at Thirumakkottai by the TNEB; it has a capacity of 107 MW.

== Transportation ==
Thirumakkottai to Mannargudi (16 km)

Thirumakkottai to Pattukkottai (23 km)

Thirumakkottai to Chennai(404 km)

Nearest major railway station is Mannargudi (16 km)

Nearest international airport is Tiruchirapalli (111 km).
