= Mannargudi =

Mannargudi Dakshina Dwarka, Rajamannargudi
- Town
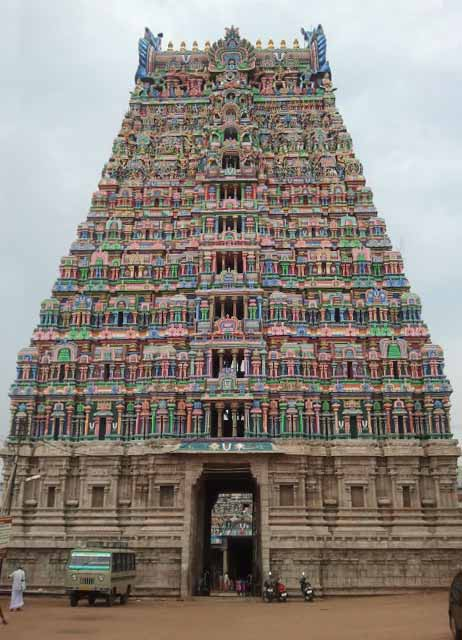
- The temple tower of Sri Vidhya Rajagopalaswamy temple, the most prominent landmark in the town
- Nickname: Mannai
- Mannargudi, Tamil Nadu
- Coordinates: 10.664900°N 79.450700°E
- Country: India
- State: Tamil Nadu
- District: Tiruvarur
- Taluk: Mannargudi
- Region: Chola Nadu

Government
  - Type: Selection Grade Municipality
  - Body: Mannargudi Municipality

Area
  - Town: 11.55 km^{2} (4.46 sq mi)
- Elevation: 45 m (148 ft)

Population (2011)
  - Town: 66,999
  - Density: 5,801/km^{2} (15,020/sq mi)
  - Metro: 105,336

Languages
  - Official: Tamil
- Time zone: UTC+5:30 (IST)
- PIN: 614001
- Vehicle registration: TN 50

Mannargudi (Tamil pronunciation: [mannaːrgɯɖi]) is a town in Thiruvarur district in the Indian state of Tamil Nadu. It is the headquarters of the Mannargudi taluk. The town is located at a distance of 28 km (17 mi) from the district headquarters Thiruvarur, 12 km from Needamangalam, 36 km from Kumbakonam, 40 km from Thanjavur, and 310 km (190 mi) from the state capital Chennai. Mannargudi is known for the Rajagopalaswamy temple, a prominent Vaishnavite shrine.

Mannargudi was founded as an agraharam village by the Medieval Cholas during the 7th century A.D. The town was subsequently ruled by various dynasties including the Chola king Rajadhiraja Chola (1018–1054 CE), Vijayanagar Empire, Delhi Sultanate, Thanjavur Nayaks, Thanjavur Marathas and the British Empire. Mannargudi was a part of the erstwhile Tanjore district until India's independence in 1947 and Thanjavur district until 1991. It subsequently became a part of the newly formed Tiruvarur district. The town is known for agriculture, metal working and weaving. The region around Mannargudi has considerable mineral deposits.

Mannargudi is administered by a municipality established in 1866. As of 2011, the municipality covered an area of 11.55 km^{2} (4.46 mi^{2}) and has a population of 67,999. Mannargudi comes under the Mannargudi assembly constituency which elects a member to the Tamil Nadu Legislative Assembly once every five years and it is a part of the Thanjavur constituency which elects its Member of Parliament (MP) once in five years. Roadways are the major mode of transportation to the town and it also has rail connectivity. The nearest seaport, Nagapattinam Port, is located 52 km (32 mi) from Mannargudi, while the nearest airport, Tiruchirappalli International Airport, is located 97 km (60 mi) from the town. Mannargudi is a fifth largest town in delta region after Thanjavur, Kumbakonam, Thiruvarur and Nagapattinam

== Etymology ==
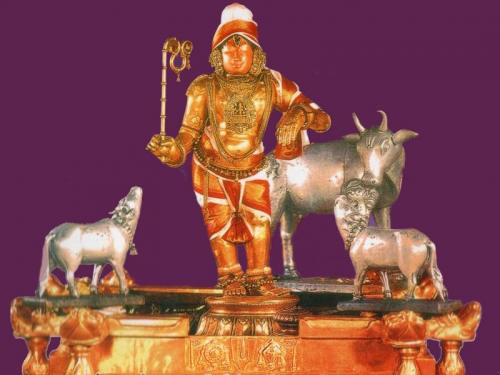
Srividhya Rajagopalaswamy of Mannargudi with cows

The word Mannargudi is derived from the Tamil word Mannar referring to Vishnu and gudi referring to a place, meaning the "Place of Vishnu". The town was also called "Mannarkovil" or "Rajamannarkoil" after the Rajagopalaswamy temple. The town is locally referred as "Mannai". Hindus refer the place as "Dakshina Dwarka", meaning Southern Dwarka. The town was known during the period of Nayaks for the 25 ft (7.6 m) tall compound wall around the Rajagopalaswamy temple, leading to the adage Mannargudi Mathil Azhagu, (meaning "the walls of Mannargudi are beautiful"). The town is also called "Koil mattrum Madil Nagaram" referring to the compound wall around the temple.

== History ==
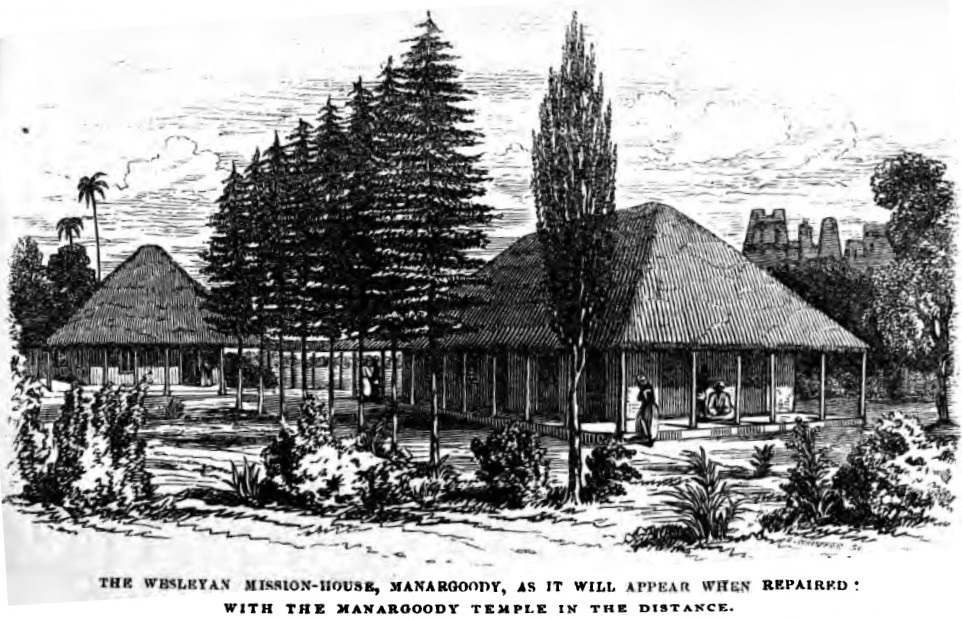
The Wesleyan Mission-House, Manargoody, as it will appear when repaired, with the Manargoody Temple in the distance (November 1855, p. 120, Rev. Thomas Hodson)

Mannargudi was founded as an agraharam village during 7th century. After that Rajadhiraja Chaturvedimangalam by the Medieval Chola king Rajadhiraja Chola (1018–1054 CE), who constructed the Jayam Kondanathar temple and the Rajathirajeswara temple. The Rajagopalaswami temple is believed to have been constructed by Kulothunga Chola I (1070–1125 CE), with bricks and mortar, indicated by various stone inscriptions found at the site. The town started to grow around the temple. Successive kings of the Chola empire, Rajaraja Chola III (1216–56 CE) and Rajendra Chola III (1246–79 CE), and Thanjavur Nayak king Achyuta Deva Raya (1529–1542 CE) expanded the temple. The temple contains inscriptions of the Hoysala kings and information about grants by Vijayanagara kings, and many records of the later Nayaks and Marathas. A fort was constructed under the rule of the Hoysala kings, and Hindu temples were built under the leadership of both Hoysala and Pandya rulers.

Mannargudi was conquered by the Delhi Sultanate in 1311 CE. Following brief occupations by the Madurai Sultanate and the Hoysalas, it became a part of the Vijayanagar Empire. After the decline of Vijayanagar Empire, Mannargudi was ruled by the Thanjavur Nayaks. The Thanjavur Nayaks made the temple as their dynastic and primary shrine and made significant additions. The current temple structure, hall of thousand pillars, main gopuram (temple gateway tower) and the big compound wall around the temple were built by the king Vijaya Raghava Nayak (1532–1575 CE). Raghunathabhyudayam, a doctrine by Nayaks explains the donation of an armour studded with precious stones to the main deity of the temple by the king. It is believed Vijaya Raghava Nayak erected the large tower in front of the temple so that he could view the Srirangam Ranganathaswamy temple. He was also called "Mannarudasan" as he carried out extensive renovations of the Rajagopalaswami temple complex and is credited by some to have reclaimed the land from the surrounding forest.

The Thanjavur Marathas gained control during the later part of 18th century until its annexation by the British East India Company in 1799. It was constituted as a municipality during 1866 and was a part of the erstwhile Tanjore district. The town was the headquarters and the only town in Mannargudi taluk. The town emerged as one of the chief centres of inland trade in the district during the British rule. Rice, betel leaves, groundnut, oil, metal articles and clothes were the major exports. A Methodist mission was established in the town during the third decade of the 19th century. During 1944, Chinese copper coins were unearthed from Thaliketti village in the region, dated to Sui period (585 CE) to the end of Song period (1275 CE). The coins indicate a possible Buddhist influence in the region. Mannargudi continued to be part of Tanjore district until India's independence in 1947 and Thanjavur district until 1991 and subsequently a part of the newly formed Tiruvarur district.

== Geography and climate ==
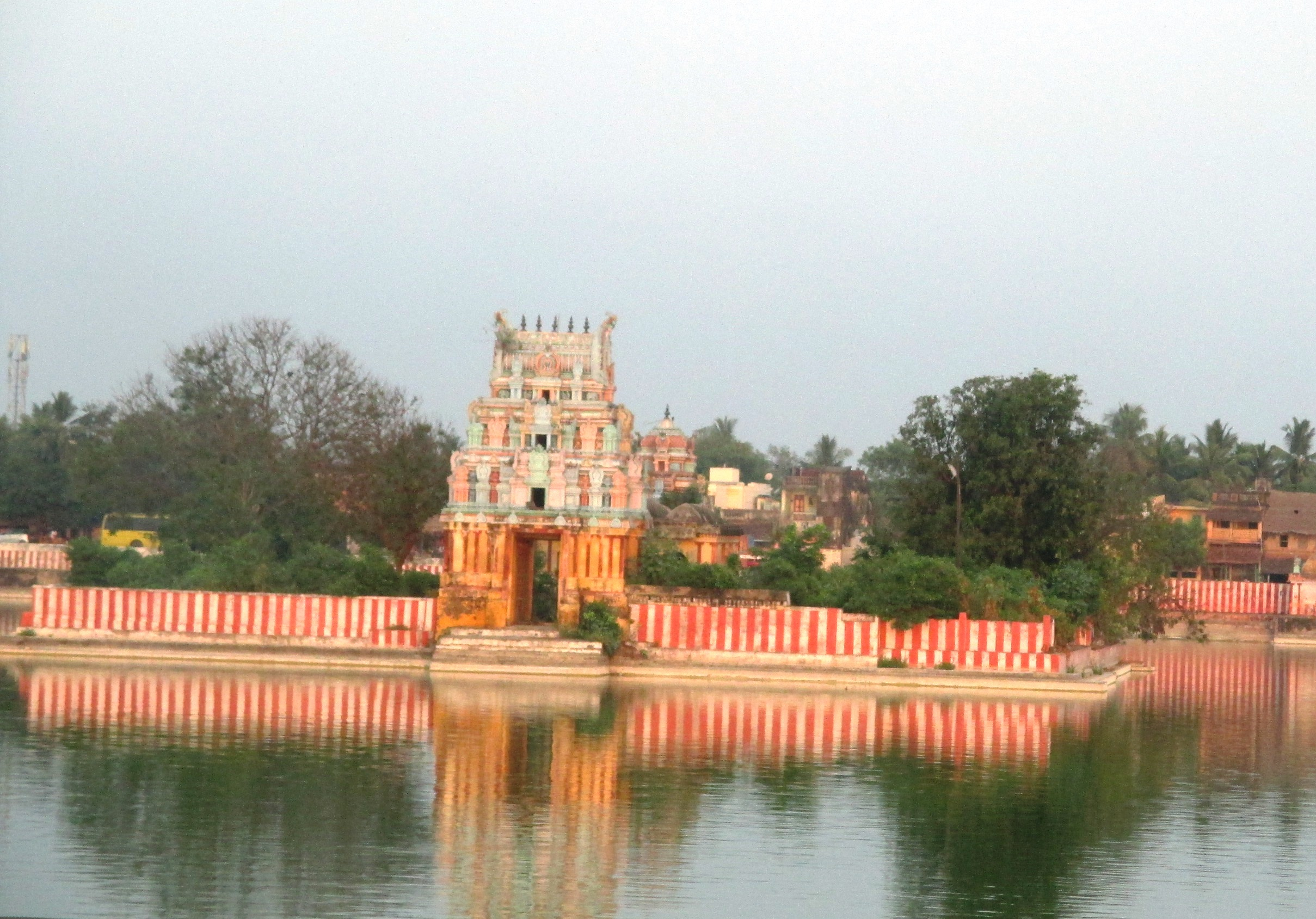
Haridra Nadhi – the temple tank in Mannargudi and one of the largest tanks in the state belonging to the Sethubhava Religious Charities

Mannargudi is located at 10.67°N 79.43°E. It has an average elevation of 6 m (20 ft). Mannargudi is situated on the banks of Pamaniyar River, a branch of the Vettar (distributary of Kaveri) and is covered with fertile soil conducive for rice cultivation. The topography is completely flat and the town is a part of the fertile Cauvery Delta. Mannargudi is situated at a distance of 300 km (190 mi) from the state capital Chennai and 28 km (17 mi) from Tiruvarur, the district headquarters. The nearest airport is at Tiruchirappalli, 90 km (56 mi) away from the town. The nearest seaport is at Nagappattinam, located 52 km (32 mi) from Mannargudi.

Like in the rest of the state, the period from November to February in Mannargudi has a climate full of warm days and cool nights. The onset of summer is from March to the end of June. The average temperature range from 37 °C (99 °F) in January to 22.5 °C (72.5 °F) in May and June. Summer rains are sparse and the first monsoon, the South-West monsoon, usually sets in June and continues until September. North-East monsoon usually sets in October and continues until January. The rainfall during North-East monsoon is relatively higher and is beneficial to the district at large because of the heavy rainfall and the Western ghats feeding the river Cauvery. The average rainfall is 37 inches (940 mm), most of which is contributed by the North-East monsoon. The most common trees planted in the town are jack fruit, coconut, tamarind and palmirah.

== Economy ==
Agriculture is the principal occupation of the people of Mannargudi. Mannargudi is also known for cloth weaving and metal industries. Being an agricultural town, Mannargudi's economy largely depends on the income from agriculture. The crops cultivated include paddy, cotton, sugarcane, and pulses like urad and mung bean. The agriculture around the town mainly depends on the rivers Koraiyaru, Mullaiyar and Pamaniyar, while the other sources of irrigation are bore-wells. There are no big industries around the town, while there are a few small scale industries like a sugarcane factory, a fertilizer industry, a beer factory and a chemical factory in and around the town. There is a gas treatment and filling plant in Edayarnatham, a village in the outskirts of Mannargudi. A 107.8 MW Combined Cycle Power plant of Tamil Nadu Electricity Board (TNEB) functions at Thirumakkottai, a village 18 km (11 mi) away from Mannargudi.

Mannargudi town has one of the largest coal reserves in the country. The total quantity of lignite reserves identified in the area is around 19,500 million tonnes. Exploration of coal bed methane in the area was not started until 2008. The commercial exploration of the coal bed methane reserves located under built up and agricultural areas became difficult with the protest of farmers in the region.

== Demographics ==
Religious census
| Religion | Percent(%) |
| Hindu | 90.13% |
| Muslim | 6.82% |
| Christian | 2.62% |
| Sikh | 0.08% |
| Buddhist | 0.01% |
| Jain | 0.22% |
| Other | 0.1% |
| No religion | 0.02% |

Historical population
| Year | Pop. | ±% |
|---|---|---|
| 1871 | 17,735 | — |
| 1881 | 19,409 | +9.4% |
| 1891 | 20,395 | +5.1% |
| 1901 | 20,449 | +0.3% |
| 1911 | 21,398 | +4.6% |
| 1921 | 21,636 | +1.1% |
| 1931 | 22,764 | +5.2% |
| 1941 | 23,288 | +2.3% |
| 1951 | 29,860 | +28.2% |
| 1961 | 33,558 | +12.4% |
| 1971 | 42,783 | +27.5% |
| 1981 | 51,738 | +20.9% |
| 1991 | 56,554 | +9.3% |
| 2001 | 61,478 | +8.7% |
| 2011 | 66,999 | +9.0% |
1871: 1881–1931: 1941–1961: 1961–2001: 2011:

According to 2011 census, Mannargudi had a population of 66,999 with a sex-ratio of 1,018 females for every 1,000 males, much above the national average of 929. A total of 6,174 were under the age of six, constituting 3,135 males and 3,039 females. Scheduled Castes and Scheduled Tribes accounted for 8.39% and 1.16% of the population respectively. The average literacy of the town was 82.92%, compared to the national average of 72.99%. The town had a total of 17372 households. There were a total of 22,640 workers, comprising 1,131 cultivators, 1,546 main agricultural labourers, 534 in house hold industries, 17,682 other workers, 1,747 marginal workers, 66 marginal cultivators, 215 marginal agricultural labourers, 75 marginal workers in household industries and 1,391 other marginal workers. Like in the rest of the state, Tamil is the most common language spoken in the town.

As per the religious census of 2011, Mannargudi had 90.13% Hindus, 6.82% Muslims, 2.62% Christians, 0.08% Sikhs, 0.01% Buddhists, 0.22% Jains, 0.1% following other religions and 0.02% following no religion or did not indicate any religious preference.

As of 2008, a total 4.006 km^{2} (990 acres) (34.68%) of the land was used for residential, 0.314 km^{2} (78 acres) (2.72%) for commercial, 0.35 km^{2} (86 acres) (3.07%) for industrial, 4.136 km^{2} (1,022 acres) (35.81%) for public & semi public purposes including educational and open spaces. As of 2008, there were a total of 28 notified slums, with 12,275 comprising 19.97% of the total population residing in those.

== Culture ==
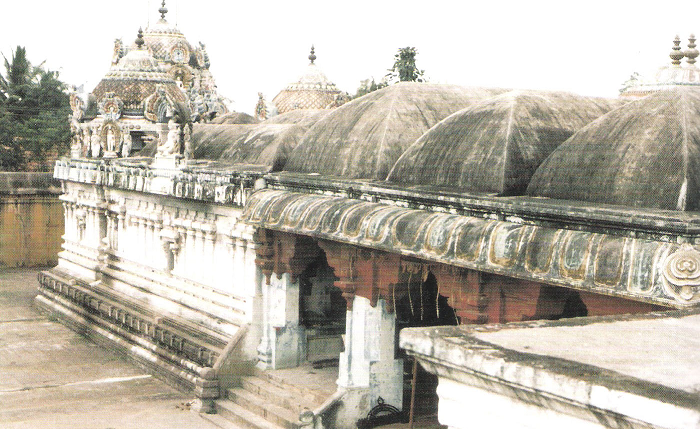
Mannargudi Mallinatha Swamy temple, a historic Jain monument in the city

Mannargudi has three prominent Hindu temples, namely, Jayamgondanatha temple, Rajathi Rajeswara temple and Raja Gopalaswamy temple. Pamani Naganathar Temple, a padal petra sthalam in Pamani is also located nearby, northerly.

Rajagopalaswamy temple is the most prominent landmark in the town. During the Tamil months of Panguni (March–April), the most prominent festival of the temple, namely, Pangunith Thirivuzha, is celebrated. Theppothsavam, the float festival, celebrated during the Tamil month of Aani (June–July) and Adipooram, the chariot festival, celebrated during the Tamil month of Aadi (July-Aug) are other prominent festivals of the temple that attract visitors from nearby villages and towns to Mannargudi. The Nayak kings of the 15th century promoted music in the temples. Instruments like Mukhavina, Dande, Kombu, Chandravalaya, Bheri and Nagaswaram were commonly used in the temple service. Haridra Nadhi, the Venugopalaswamy temple tank associated with Sethubhava Mutt, is one of the largest temple tanks in the state. Hindu pilgrims take a holy dip in the tank during festive occasions.

Mannargudi has four mosques, located at Theradi, Keela Raja Veethi, Big Bazar Street and Thamari Kuzlam Vada Karai.

Mallinatha Swamy temple is a Jain temple located in the town. Mallinathar is the 19th Tirthankara of the Jainism. It is an ancient temple built during the reign of the Chola dynasty in the twelfth century and is one of the prominent ancient Jain temples in the state. Apart from the idol of Mallinathar, there are idols of Dharma Devi, Saraswathi Devi, Padmavathy Devi, Jawalamalini Amman among others.

The Vaduvoor Bird Sanctuary, located 12 km (7.5 mi) is a prominent visitor attraction for the people of Mannargudi. Muthupet Lagoon, a mangrove forest located 29 km (18 mi) away from the town, is another tourist attraction for the citizens of the town.

== Administration and politics ==
Municipality Officials
| Chairman | Mannai. T. Chozharajan |
| Commissioner | TBA |
| Vice Chairman | R. Kailasam |
Elected Members
| Member of Legislative Assembly | S.Kamaraj |
| Member of Parliament | Su. Murasoli |

The municipality of Mannargudi was established in 1866 with a committee of twelve members during British rule. Until the early years of the 20th century, Mannargudi remained one of the five municipalities in erstwhile Tanjore district. As of 2008, the municipality covered an area of 11.55 km^{2} (4.46 mi^{2}) and had a total of 33 members. The functions of the municipality is devolved into six departments: General, Engineering, Revenue, Public Health, Town planning and the Computer Wing. All these departments are under the control of a Municipal Commissioner who is the supreme executive head. The legislative powers are vested in a body of 33 members, one each from the 33 wards. The legislative body is headed by an elected Chairperson assisted by a Deputy Chairperson. The municipality has allocated a budget of ₹8,751,164 for the year 2010–11.

Mannargudi comes under the Mannargudi State Assembly Constituency and it elects a member to the Tamil Nadu Legislative Assembly once every five years. From the 1971 elections, the assembly seat was won by Dravida Munnetra Kazhagam (DMK) 5 times during the 1971, 1989 2011, 2016 and 2021 elections, the Communist Party of India five times during the 1977, 1980, 1996, 2001 and 2006 elections and the All India Anna Dravida Munnetra Kazhagam (AIADMK) twice during the 1984 and 1991 elections. The current Member of Legislative Assembly (MLA) of the constituency is Dr. T R B Rajaa from the DMK Party. He has done notable projects for the constituency. The Mannai Express train project was officially inaugurated in his term and he has widened this massive project. Vaduvur Indoor Stadium in Vaduvur is another landmark of Mannargudi and milestone in his political career.

Mannargudi is a part of the Thanjavur Lok Sabha constituency and elects a member to the Lok Sabha, the lower house of the Parliament of India, once every five years. R. Venkataraman, who served as the President of India from 1987 to 1992, was elected from the constituency during the 1951 elections.

== Education ==
There are 17 schools and three arts colleges in Mannargudi. The Findlay Higher Secondary School (formerly Findlay College), founded by the Wesleyan Mission in 1845, is the oldest educational institution in the town. Originally started as a secondary school, the college was upgraded to a high school and a college in 1883. It was affiliated to the Madras University in 1898. There are two engineering colleges and two polytechnic colleges in the town. The Mannai Rajagopalaswami Government Arts College, founded in 1971, and the Sengamala Thayar Educational Trust Women's College are the two colleges in the town.

== Utility services ==
Electricity supply to Mannargudi is regulated and distributed by the Tamil Nadu Electricity Board (TNEB). The town and its suburbs forms the Trichy Electricity Distribution Circle.

Historically, water supply to the town was provided from a 12 km (7.5 mi) long channel dug from the Vadavar canal. Water supply is provided by the municipality of Mannargudi from groundwater through feeders. In 2010–2011, a total of 3.53 million litres of water was supplied every day for households in the town.

About 24 metric tonnes of solid waste are collected from Mannargudi every day by door-to-door collection. Subsequently, the source segregation and dumping is carried out by the sanitary department of the municipality. The coverage of solid waste management had an efficiency of 83% as of 2001. There is limited underground drainage system in the town and the major sewerage system for disposal of sullage is through septic tanks, open drains and public conveniences. The municipality maintains 15 km (9.3 mi) of storm water drains and 35 km (22 mi) kutcha drains in Mannargudi.

There are three hospitals, two maternity centres and eight private hospitals and clinics. There are 2,609 street lamps in Mannargudi: 584 sodium lamps, 2,013 tube lights and five high mast beam lamp. The municipality operates four markets, namely vegetable markets, weekly market, farmer's market (uzhavar santhai) and fish market that cater to the needs of the town and the rural areas around it.

== Transportation ==
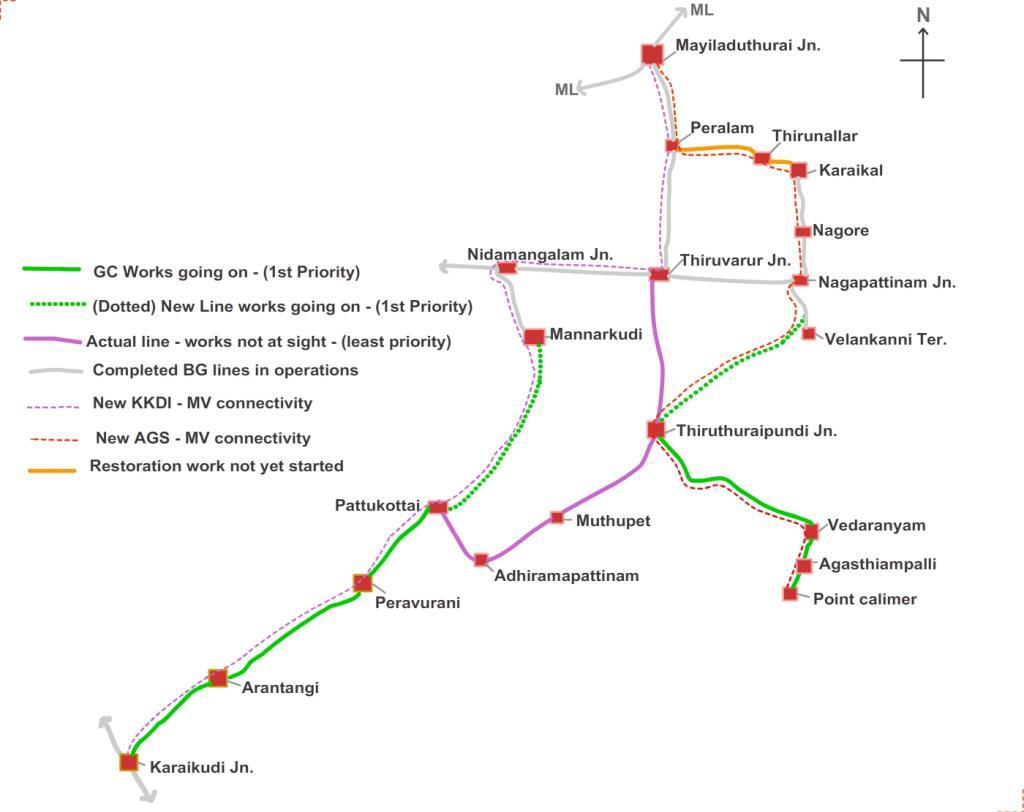
Mayiladuthurai to Karaikudi Via Nidamangalam and Mannargudi

The State Highway SH-63 connecting Thanjavur with Kodikkarai, SH-66 connecting Kumbakonam with Adirampattinam, SH-202 connecting the district headquarters Tiruvarur with Muthupet and SH-146 connecting Mannargudi with Sethubavachatram, are the major highways connecting Mannargudi with other towns. There are two bus stands in the town, with the major bus stand having 19 bus bays and a TNSTC ticket reservation counter. The Tamil Nadu State Transport Corporation operates daily services connecting cities to Mannargudi. The corporation operates a computerised reservation centre in the bus stand. The State Express Transport Corporation operates long-distance buses connecting the town to cities like Chennai, Tirupati and Bengaluru, other long route buses operated by government from this town to rest of the places Tiruchirapalli, Coimbatore, Madurai, Salem, Erode, Vellore, Kanchipuram, Tiruvannamalai, Puducherry, Tiruppur, Palani, Theni, Pudukkottai, Karaikudi, Rameshwaram etc. The major inter-city bus routes are to towns like Kumbakonam, Mayiladuthurai, Nagapattinam, Thanjavur, Tiruvarur, Thiruthuraipoondi, Karaikal, Vedaranyam, Jayankondam and Pattukkottai. Now the Ring Road about 22 km is under progress due to reduce traffic.

Mannargudi station is connected to Nidamangalam rail line by a branch line covering a distance of 18 km (11 mi). The expansion of the line to broad gauge was completed and opened to passenger traffic on 27 September 2011, with an express train to Chennai. The nearest railway junction is Needamangalam Junction. There are daily passenger trains to Thanjavur and Mayiladuthurai and an express train each to Coimbatore and Chennai from Mannargudi., Thrice a week Express train to Tirupati (Wed, Fri & Sat) and Weekly Express Train to Rajasthan also being operated from mannargudi (Monday) . The Railway link from Mannargudi to Pattukkottai is under progress.

The nearest seaport is Nagapattinam Port, 52 km (32 mi) away, while the nearest airport is the Tiruchirappalli International Airport, 97 km (60 mi) from the town.
