= Rajagopalaswamy Temple, Mannargudi =

Hindu temple in Tiruvarur

Sri Vidhya Rajagopalaswamy Temple
- Champakaranya Kshetram
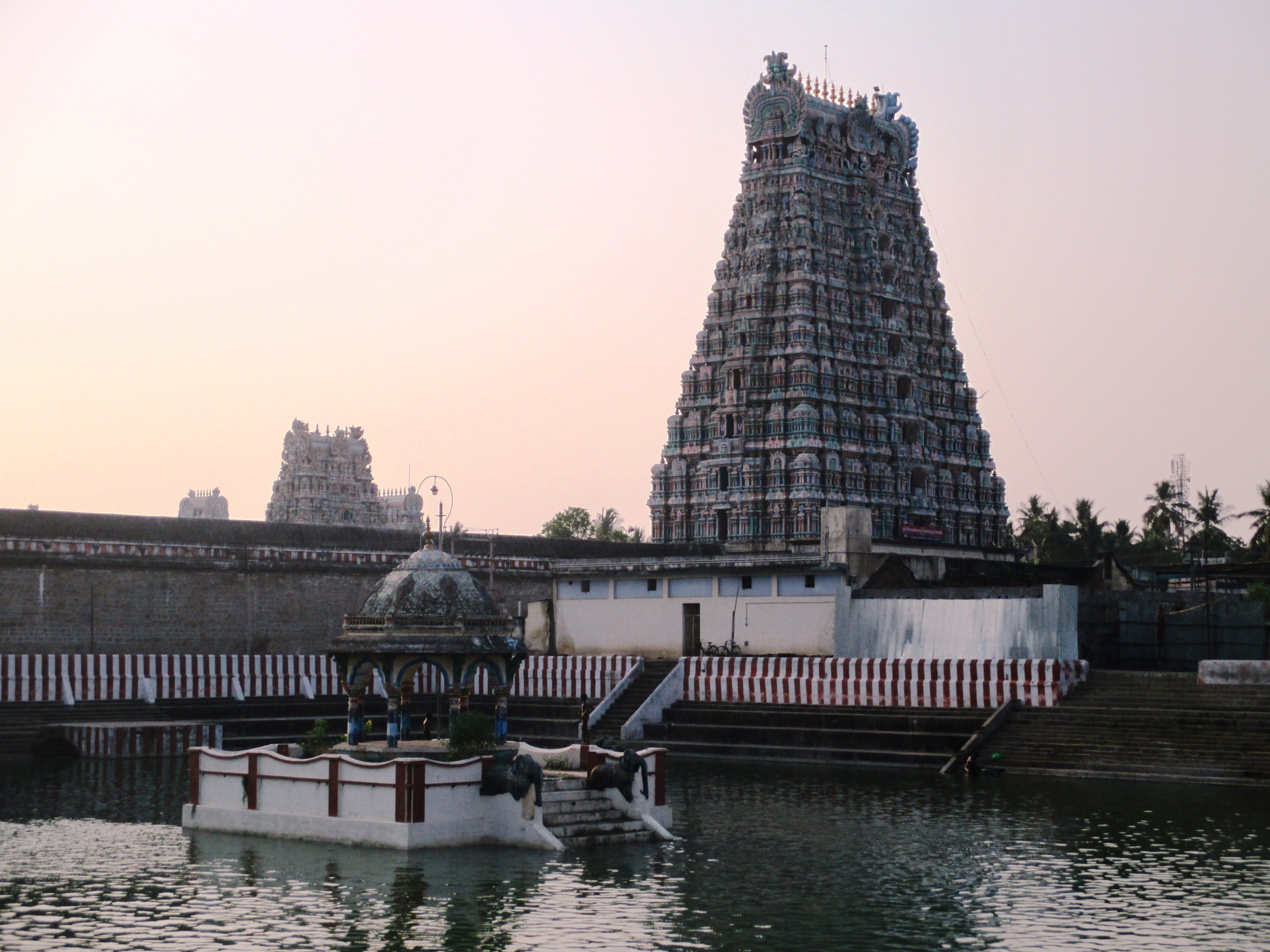

- Location in Tamil Nadu

Religion
- Affiliation: Hinduism
- District: Tiruvarur
- Deity: {{hlist|Sri Vidhya Rajagopalaswamy (Krishna)|Sri Sengamala (Vīraśaktī svarūpa of Bhogśaktī Rukmiṇī).
- Festivals: Panguni Brahmotsavam, Thiruvadipooram, Teppotsavam, Thirupavithrotsavam, Navaratri Utsavam, Kolatta Utsavam, Deepotsavam, Adhyayana Utsavam, Dolotsavam, Etc.
- Features: Tower: 16; Temple tank: Haridra Nadhi, Krishna Theertham, Etc.

Location
- Location: Mannargudi
- State: Tamil Nadu
- Country: India
- Coordinates: 10°40′1″N 79°26′32″E

Architecture
- Type: Tamil architecture
- Creator: Kulothunga Chola I, Later Chola Kings
- Elevation: 46.93 m (154 ft)

Website
- https://hrce.tn.gov.in/hrcehome/index_temple.php?tid=14267

Sri Vidhya Rajagopalaswamy temple is a Vaishnava shrine located in the town of Mannargudi, Tamil Nadu, India. The presiding deity is Rajagopalaswamy, a form of Krishna and his consort Lakshmi, who is worshipped as Sri Sengamala Thayar. The temple is spread over an area of 9.3 ha (23 acres) and is an important Vaishnava shrines in India. The temple is called Champakaranya Kshetram, Dakshina Dwaraka (Southern Dvaraka) along with Guruvayoor by Hindus, Vanduvaraapathi and Vasudevapuri. It is considered first among the 108 Abhimana Kshethram of Vaishnavate tradition.

Originally this ancient temple was first constructed by Kulothunga Chola I at 10th century and Chola Kings Rajaraja Chola III, Rajendra Chola III and later expanded by Thanjavur Nayaks during the 16th century. The temple has three inscriptions from the period and also mention in the religious texts. A granite wall surrounds the temple, enclosing all its shrines and seven of its nine bodies of water. The wall is celebrated in Tamil as “Mannargudi Mathil Alagu”, meaning "the beauty of the walls," highlighting its grandeur and cultural significance. The temple has a 47 m (154 ft) rajagopuram, the temple's gateway tower. The temple is associated with nine theerthams (sacred water bodies): Haridranadhi, Durvasa Theertham (also called Gajendra Theertham), Thirupparkadal, Gopika Theertham (also known as Gopralaya Theertham), Rukmini Theertham, Sanghu Theertham, Chakkra Theertham, Agnikunda Theertham, and Krishna Theertham, along with the Pambani River. Among them, Haridra Nadhi, the temple tank associated with the temple is outside the temple complex and is considered one of the largest temple tanks in India.

Pundarikakshan is believed to have appeared as Krishna to sages Gopillar and Gopralayar.

Six daily rituals and three yearly festivals are held at the temple, of which the chariot festival, celebrated during the Tamil month of Panguni (March–April), being the most prominent. The temple is maintained and administered by the Hindu Religious and Endowment Board of the Government of Tamil Nadu.

== Architecture ==
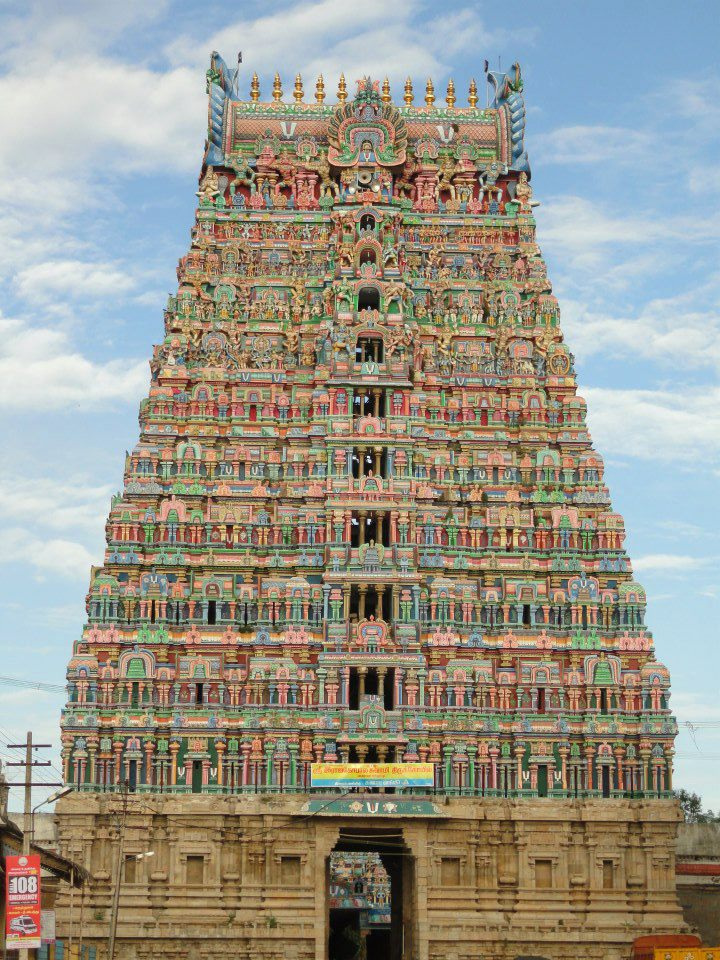
The image of Rajagopuram, the main entrance

The history of Mannargudi in centered around the Rajagoplaswamy temple. The temple has a large gopuram (gateway tower) facing east with a temple tank in the north eastern direction. The central shrine is located axial to the gateway and the flagpost and approached through a series of pillared halls. The image of the presiding deity is 156 inches tall and sported in a seated posture with his consorts Satyabhama and Rukmini on his sides. There is a big tank at the entrance of the shrine where rain water is collected. The temple complex has 16 gopurams (tower gateways), 7 prakarams (outer courtyard), 24 shrines, seven mandapams (halls) and nine sacred theerthams (temple tanks). The utsava (festival deity) is a bronze figure from the Chola period. It shows keshabanda type of coiffure and restrained ornamentation, atypical of the Chola bronzes of the 11th century. The temple tank is called Haridra Nadhi, 353 m (1,158 ft) long and 255 m (837 ft) broad (9.3 ha (23 acres)), making it one of the largest temple tanks in India. The shrine of Sengamalathayar (also called Hemabhujavalli) is located in the second precinct around the sanctum. The temple has a thousand pillared hall.

=== Shrines and Temple Orientation ===
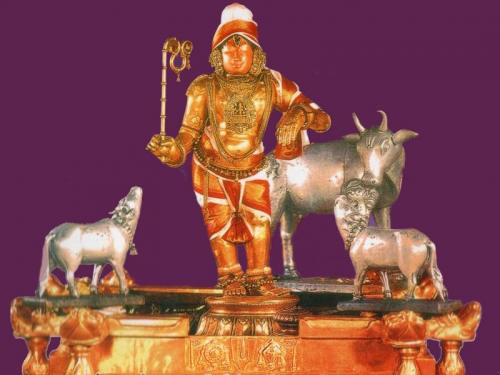
Sri Vidhya Rajagopalaswamy

The temple complex of Mannargudi Rajagopalaswamy Temple includes 24 shrines, primarily dedicated to Vishnu in various forms, Sri Lakshmi as Sengamala Thayar, and numerous Alwars and Vaishnava acharyas. The central sanctum enshrines Sri Paravasudeva Perumal, accompanied by Sri Devi and Bhu Devi. The processional deity, Sri Vidya Rajagopalan, is depicted in a majestic seated posture flanked by his consorts Sri Rukmini and Sri Satyabhama, reflecting the divine cowherd form (Gopala) of Krishna. The Mahamandapam (Sabha) in front of the sanctum has ornate brass-plated pillars and opens into the first circumambulatory path, Thiruvaimozhi Prakara, considered the most sacred passage around the sanctum. Within this innermost prakara are shrines for Vinayaka (Ganesha) and Durga, the latter venerated locally as Vishnudurgai and Gajendra Azhwar, a rare feature shared with temples like Srirangam. Moving westward from the sanctum, the Ardha Mandapam and additional mandapas house associated icons and are used for daily and festival rituals.

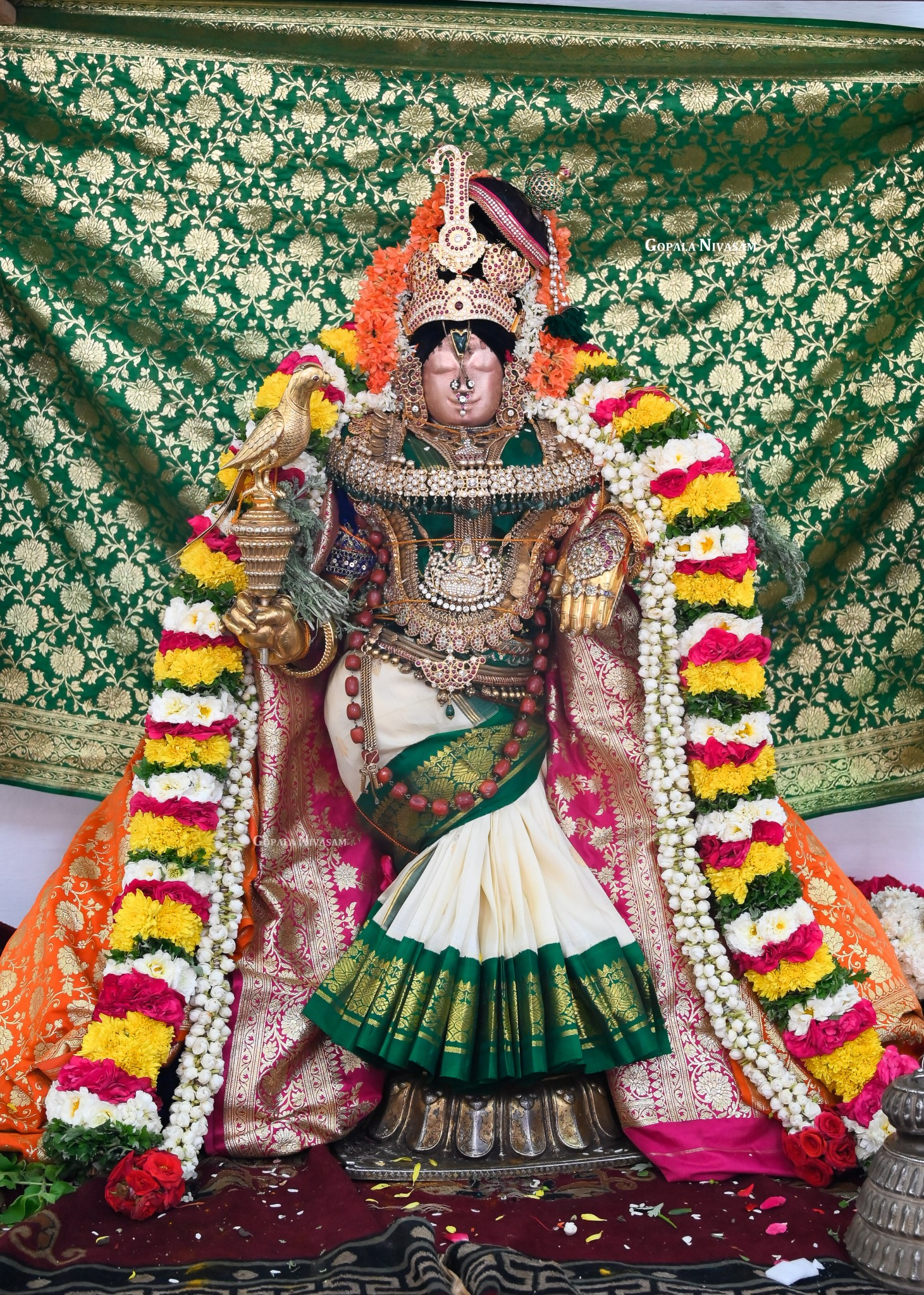
Sri Perumal in Andal Thirukolam

The second prakara called as Garuda Prakaram also contains the shrines of Garuda, followed by Jaya and Vijaya (gatekeepers of Vaikuntha) and the Utsava Murti of Perumal. Within its precinct is another sanctum dedicated to other avatars of Vishnu namely Venugopala, Lakshmi Narasimha, Ananta Padmanabha, Lakshmi Narayana and Gajendra Varada reflecting the theological significance of various forms associated with Vaishnavism. To the north of this prakara lie shrines for Vishvaksena, the leader of Vishnu's entourage and Sutravati Devi; these are followed by a vahana mandapa that houses ornaments made with gold and silver used for decorating the temple. A tunnel is also said to run underground below this area. The Champaka Prakaram is the third enclosure and is so called because of the champaka trees at one time to be found here and contains several shrines and ritual structures. The others include ones dedicated to Andal, Nammalvar, Manavala Mamunigal, Periyalwar and Kulasekhara Alwar along with Tirumangai Alwar and Kumudavalli as well Thondaradippodi Alwar and Anjaneya also believed to be engaged in worship of Chakkarathazhwar. A mandapam close by is used for conducting Kodai Utsavam and Vasantha Utsavams. The temple kitchen named the Madaippalli, dedicated for Madaipalli Nachiyar is also located in this prakara.

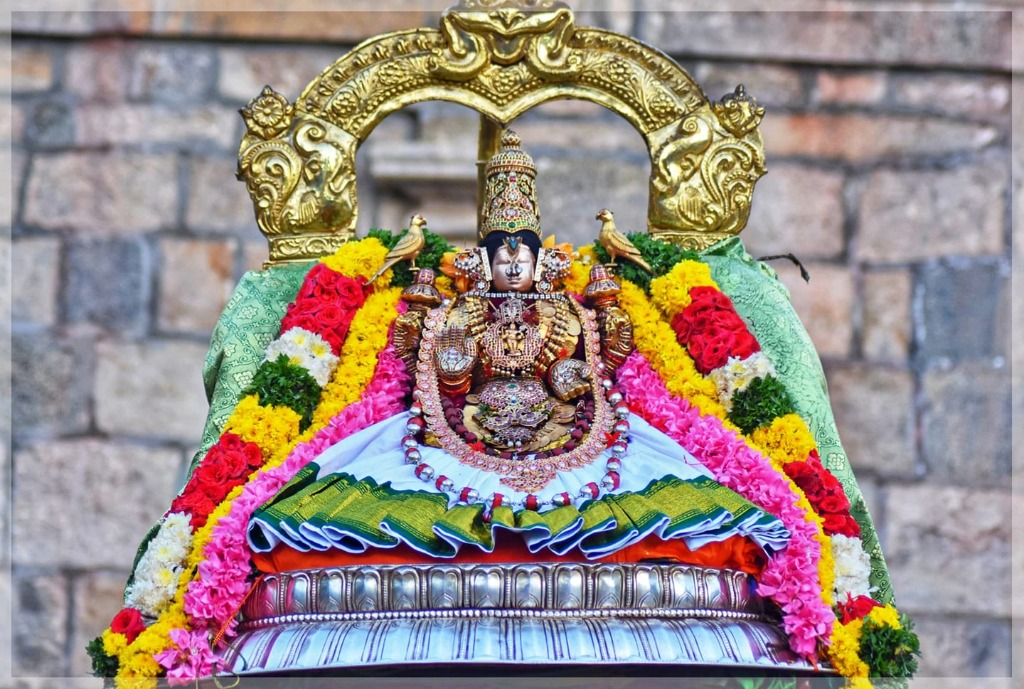
Sri Sengamala Thayar

The shrine of Sri Sengamala Thayar, a central and independently celebrated deity of the temple, is situated in the southern section of this prakara. It houses the Moolavar (Sri Shenbagavalli Thayar) and Utsavar (Sri Sengamala Thayar). The shrine complex includes the Nritya Mandapam, the Glass Mandapam, the Vaikunta Sabha (Rohini Mandapam), and the Flagmast with sculptures of Garuda and Suparni, a rare representation. On Fridays and during festivals like Mattaiyadi Utsavam, Thayar Adhyayana Utsavam, and Ekasimhana Utsavam, Thayar receives special abhishekam and darshan rituals, often accompanied by the chanting of the Gadya Traya composed by Ramanuja. From here a temple abode for Sri Rama, with mandapams such as Nritya Mandapam, Mahamandapa also an Artha Mandapam ' and the Sri Paduka Mandapam along with Paramapada Vasal and Pancha Parva Uthsava Mandapas. The holy Punnai Tree, the sthala vriksha of the temple grows in close vicinity with Yagasala where performance of Vedic rituals and yagas takes place. In front of the central shrine stands the Vadya Mandapam with sculpted images of Achyutappa Nayak, Vijaya Raghava Nayak and Rani Champakalakshmi. Nearby, the Uttara Mandapam and the Perarulalan shrine is employed during the Pagal Pattu and Brahmotsavam festivals.

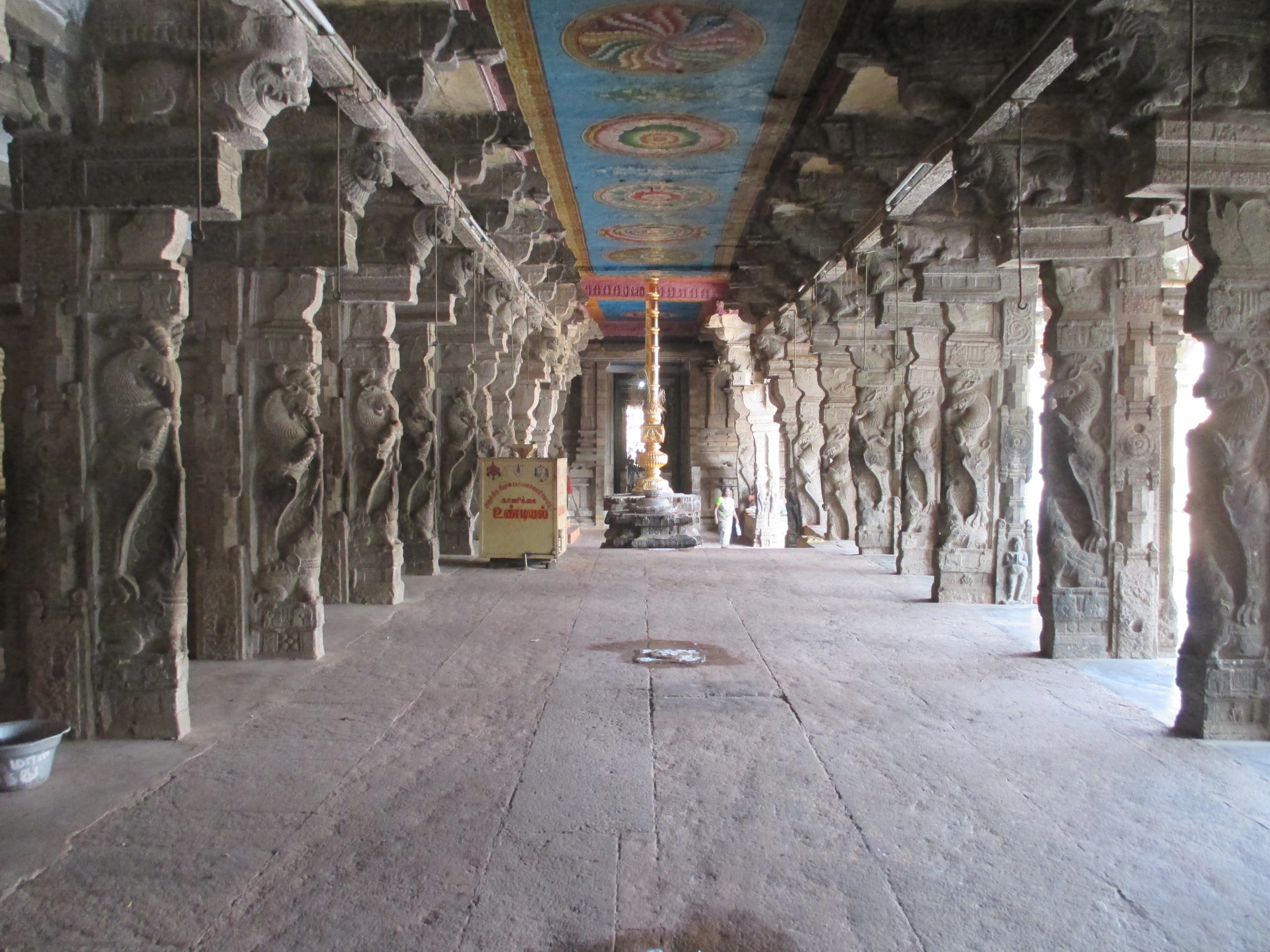
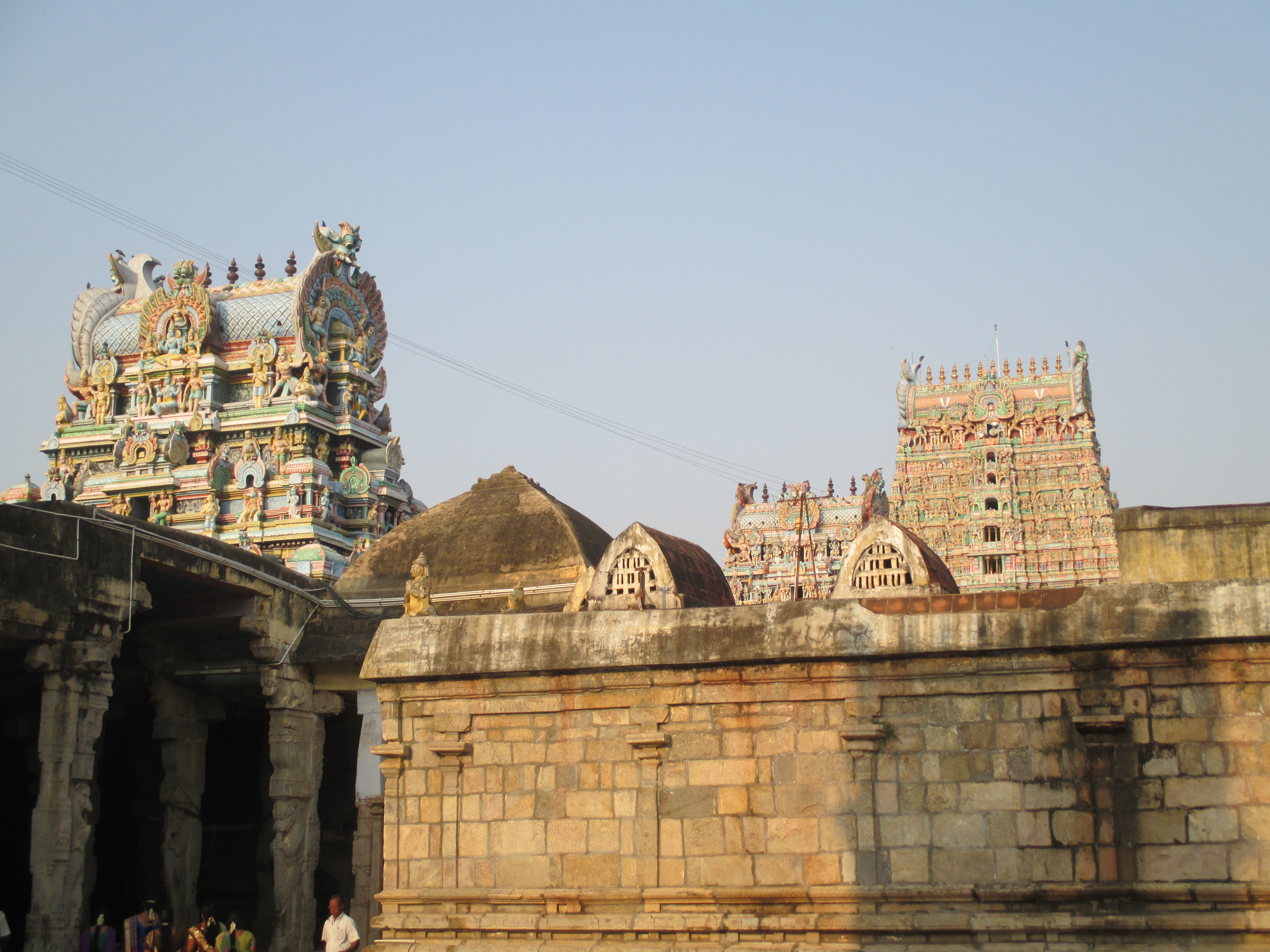
Image of shrines in the temple

The fourth prakara, Kasi Prakaram, includes the grand Thousand-Pillared Mandapam, the Tirumamani Mandapam—central to Vaikuntha Ekadasi rituals—and mandapams for Vedic discourse and public worship. Shrines for Kurattalwar, Udayavar (Ramanuja), and Sri Nigamata Maha Desikan—the only Vadakalai shrine in the temple—are located here. A public drinking water well and other practical structures are also situated in this area.The fifth circumambulatory path, Nachiyar Prakaram, is unique in that it hosts the chariot procession of Sri Sengamala Thayar, a rare tradition where the goddess, rather than the lord, takes part in a separate ratha utsavam. The prakaram includes multiple gopurams, such as the Western Gopuram used historically by Thanjavur kings, and sacred tanks reserved for Thayar's worship. It also contains the Elephant shelter, Cow Shed, Sixteen-Pillared Mandapam for the Tiruvandikkappu ritual, and the Yoga Narasimha shrine. A newly constructed mandapam offers a prominent view of the Krishna Gopura, adding to the temple's ceremonial architecture. Together, these shrines reflect a vibrant ecosystem of Vishnu devotion, Lakshmi worship, Alwar veneration, and rich liturgical tradition. The spatial arrangement, iconography, and ceremonial use of each shrine contribute to the temple's status as a significant center of Sri Vaishnavism in Tamil Nadu.

=== Halls of the Temple ===
The Rajagopalaswamy Temple complex features a series of richly constructed mandapams (pillared halls) that serve as both architectural highlights and focal points during temple rituals and festivals.

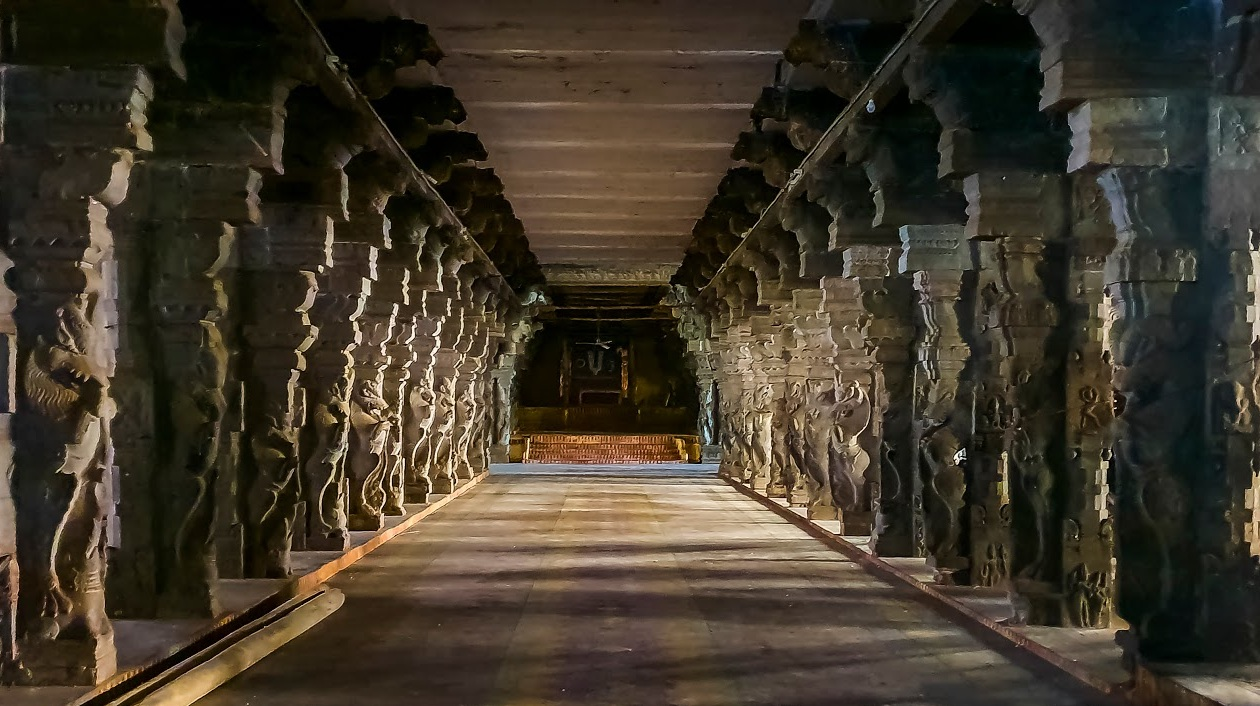
Thousand-Pillared Mandapam

These halls are strategically located across the prakarams (circumambulatory enclosures), contributing to the functional layout of the temple and enhancing the visual and devotional experience of devotees. Several circumambulatory paths—such as Tiruvunnazhi Prakaram, Garuda Prakaram, Champaka Prakaram, Kasi Prakaram, and Nachiyar Prakaram—are known for their spaciousness and architectural elegance. The mandapams located along these paths play a central role during major temple events, especially the annual Brahmotsavam and the Adhyayana Utsavam.

The temple features seven principal mandapams, each associated with specific utsavams and traditions:

- Vallala Maharaja Mandapam: This hall is actively used during the Pagal Pathu portion of the Adhyayana Utsavam and during the Kollatta Utsavam, a unique local celebration. It is also a point of royal historical interest, reflecting regal patronage.
- Thousand-Pillared Mandapam: One of the most iconic halls in the temple, it hosts the Raa Pathu segment of the Adhyayana Utsavam and major celebrations like the Navaratri Utsavam. It is known for its vast space and rows of intricately carved granite pillars, exemplifying Nayak architecture.
- Garuda Vahana Mandapam: This mandapam plays a key role during the Garuda Sevai on the twelfth day of the Panguni Brahmotsavam, where the utsava murti of Perumal is brought here before being seated in the Chapparam (processional canopy).
- Yanai Vahana Mandapam: During the Panguni Brahmotsavam, most vahana processions commence from this mandapam. It acts as a preparatory area for the various festival mounts of the deity.
- Lattice-Window Mandapam (Palakani Mandapam): Known for its elegant stone lattice work that allows for a balcony-style view, this mandapam is used during Rohini Nakshatram when the Utsavar Sri Perumal proceeds here for Thirumanjanam (ritual bathing ceremony).
- Butter Pot Mandapam (Vennai Thazhi Mandapam): Associated with the Vennai Thazhi Utsavam, a Krishna-themed celebration during the Brahmotsavam, this mandapam is where Sri Rajagopalan is taken in procession to recreate the divine play of Krishna stealing butter.
- Mast-Wood Vehicle Mandapam (Punnai Vahana Mandapam): This hall is central to the Punnai Vahana Utsavam during Brahmotsavam, in which the deity is taken across the temple's sacred precincts, traditionally even symbolizing a journey across the Kaveri River.

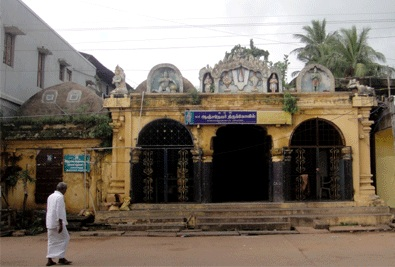
Vennai Thazhi Mandapam

Additional functional mandapams found throughout the temple include the Nritya Mandapam, Maha Mandapam, Artha Mandapam, and the Sixteen-Pillared Mandapam (Sri Paduka Mandapam), each of which plays a role in ritual recitations, darshan arrangements, and seasonal ceremonies. The Pancha Parva Utsava Mandapam, Paramapada Entrance, and Yagasala further support the temple's extensive festival calendar and Vedic rites. These mandapams not only reflect the temple's rich architectural legacy but also form the sacred stage upon which the temple's ceremonial life unfolds throughout the year.

== History ==
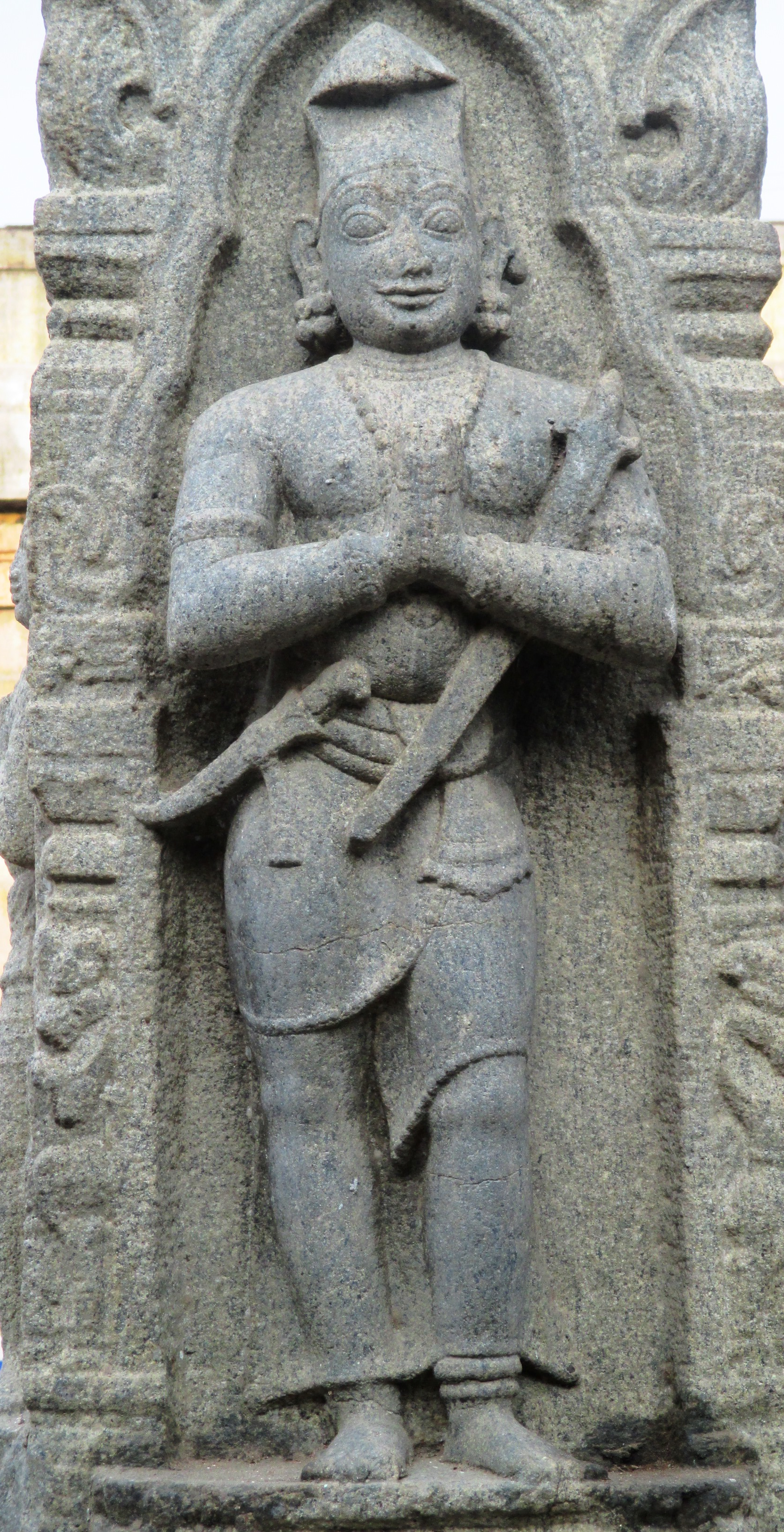
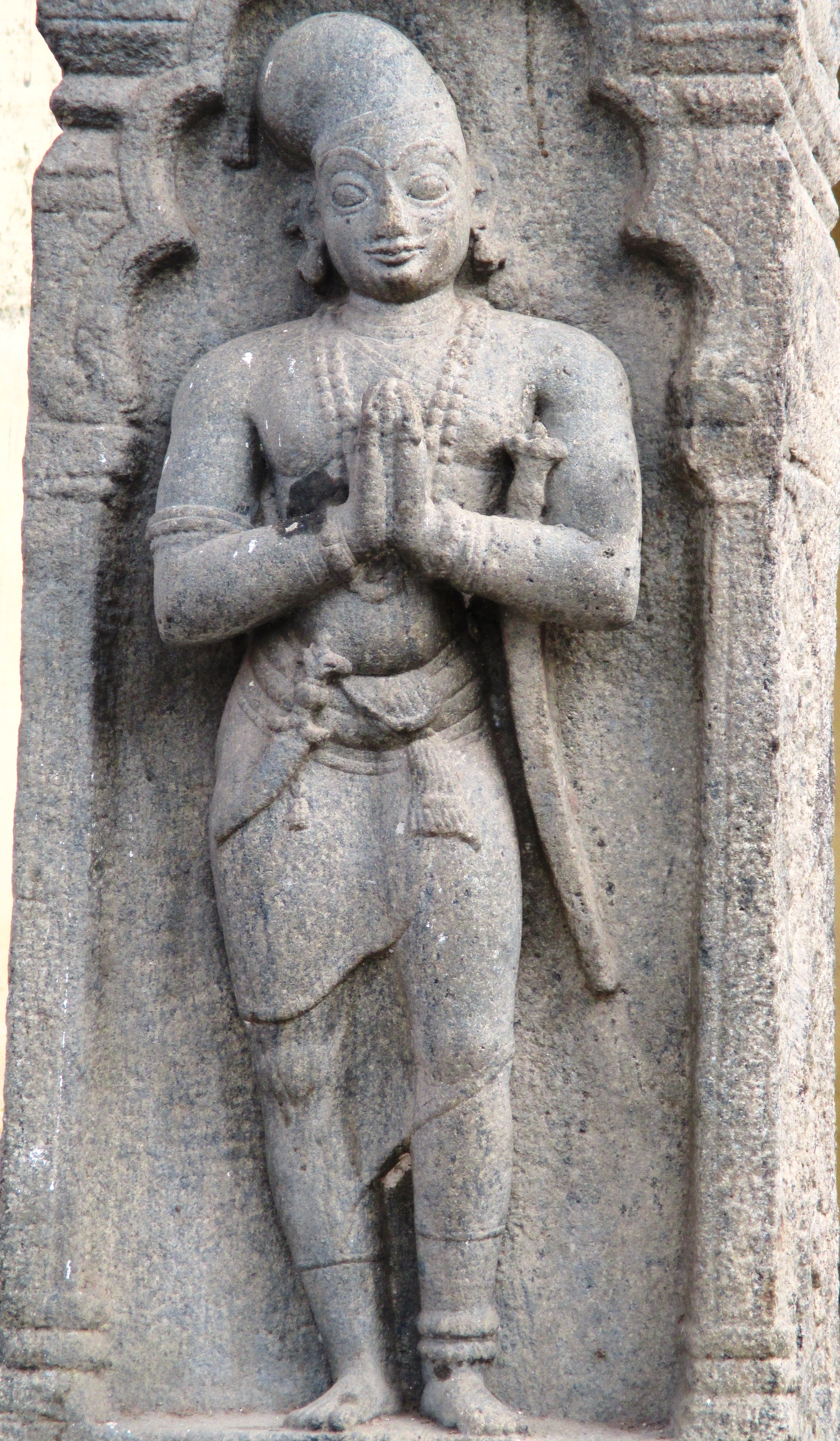
Sculptures in the temple

The original temple was first constructed by Kulothunga Chola I(1070-1125 CE) according to a stone inscription found at the site. The place Mannargudi is termed Sri Rajathi Raja Chathurvedhi Mangalam and the town started to grow around the temple. Successive kings of the Chola Empire, Rajaraja Chola III, Rajendra Chola III and kings of Thanjavur Nayaks, Achyuta Deva Raya expanded the temple. The temple contains inscriptions of the Hoysala kings and some Vijayanagara grants, and many records of the later Nayaks and Marathas. The Thanjavur Nayaks made the temple as their dynastic and primary shrine and made significant additions. The current temple structure, hall of 1000 pillars, main gopuram (temple gateway tower) and the big compound wall around the temple was built by the king Vijayaraghava Nayak (1532–1575 CE). Raghunathabhyudayam, a doctrine by Nayaks explains the donation of an armour studded with precious stones to the main deity by the king. He erected the big tower in the temple so that he can view the Srirangam Ranganathaswamy temple from the top of Mannargudi. The Nayaks were specially interested in music and it was promoted in both the temples. Instruments like Mukhavina, Dande, Kombu, Chandravalaya, Bheri and Nadhasvaram were commonly used in the temple service.

According to historian K.V. Soundararajan, the Rangantha temples in South India built during the 9th and 10th centuries have a systematic arrangement of subsidiary deities as seen in this temple along with the Appakkudathaan Perumal Temple at Koviladi, Sowmya Narayana Perumal temple at Thirukoshtiyur, Veeraraghava Perumal Temple at Thiruvallur and Rangantha temple at Srirangapatna.

== Festival ==
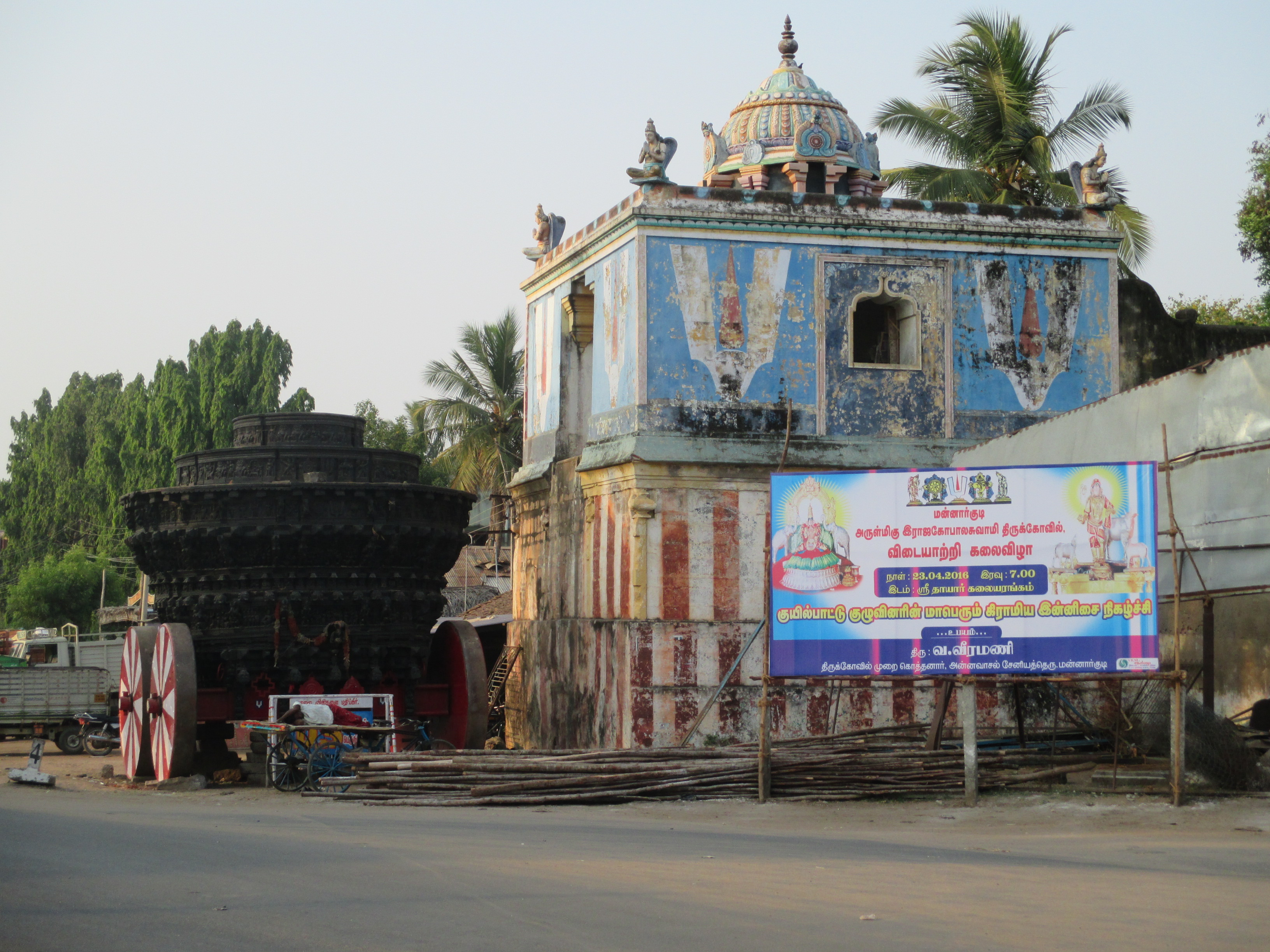
Chariot of Rajagopalaswamy temple

=== Temple Timings ===
The temple doors open early in morning (Vishwaroopam sevai) and remain accessible for devotees until noon, reopening in the evening for further worship. Morning: 06:00 AM to 12:30 PM and Evening: 04:30 PM to 09:00 PM. The temple conducts Six Kaala Puja as part of the daily rituals, the timings are as follows: Vishwaroopam at 06:00 AM., Thiruvannathal at 08:00 am., Kalasanthi at 09:30 am., Uchikaalam at 11:30 AM., Sayaratsai at 06:00 PM., Thiruvarathanam at 07:30 PM and Arthajamam: 09:00 PM. Each ritual comprises three parts: alangaram, neivethanam and deepa aradanai to the Lord. These timings may vary during festivals and special occasions and processions.

=== Annual Utsavams ===
The Brahmotsavams, Monthly Utsavams, other annual festivals at this temple are also a testimony to the tradition and culture of the community. Those or ongoing festivities occur in every month of the Tamil calendar and has their basis in Vaishnavite practices. The main festival is the eighteen-day Panguni Brahmotsavam, concluding with Twelve days Vidayatri Vizha, Krishna Theertham Teppotsavam. Thiruvadipooram Ustavam, Vaikunta Ekadashi, Navaratri, Theppotsavam (float) and other annual Utsavam were performed in a year as per temple traditions.

==== Panguni (March–April) ====
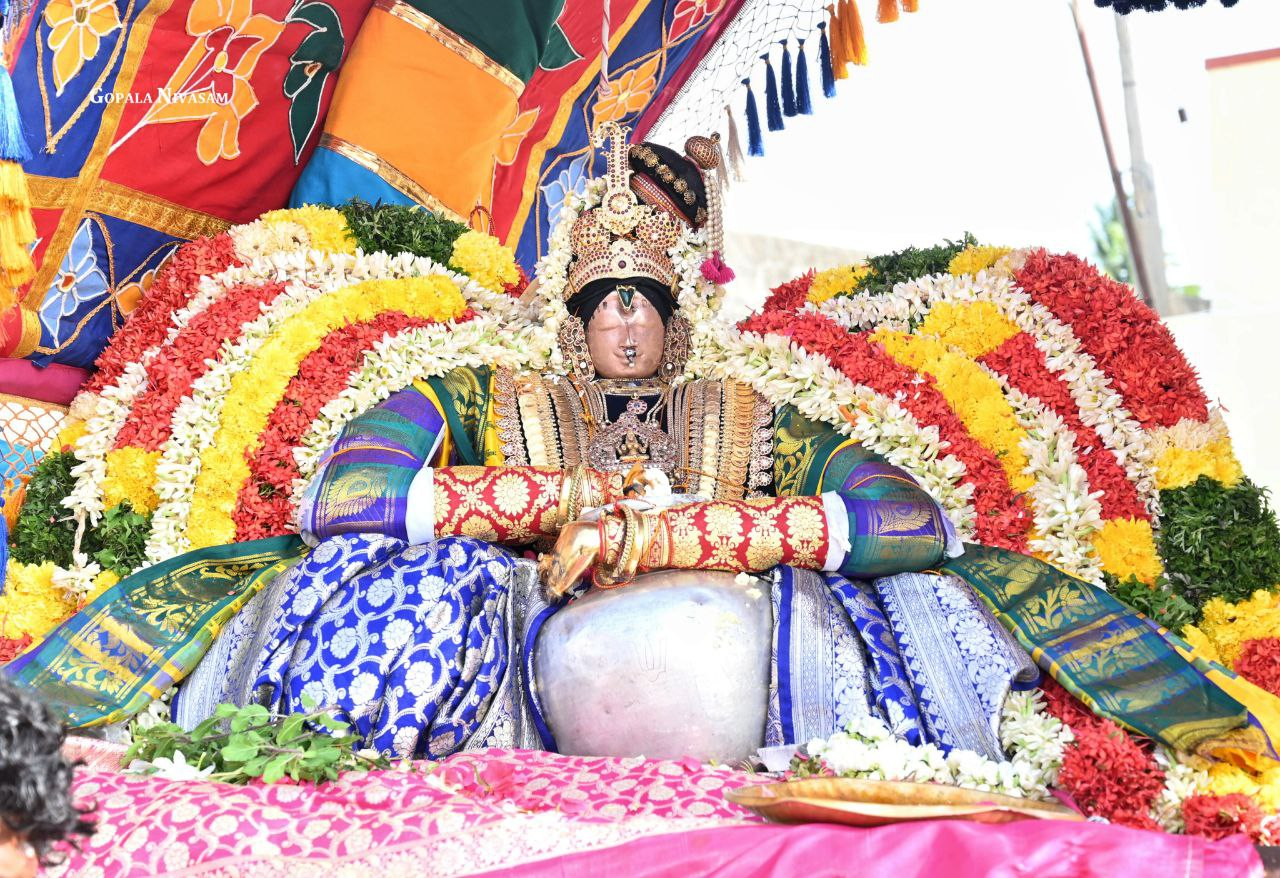
Vennai Thazhi Sevai

The major festivals celebrated in the temple are 18-day Panguni Brahmotsavam in honor of Sri Sri Vidhya Rajagopalaswamy's Thirunakshatram. During the second day, the enactment of the famous story of Krishna taking away the dress of bathing females, the females requesting the clothes back and Krishna singing the flute. The festival deity is placed in the punnai tree, the branches of which are hung with garments and ornaments. On the sixth day, Sri Rajagopalan appears in Raja Alankaram and mounts the rare Kanda Peranda Pakshi Vahanam, a celestial bird venerated in all Divya Desams and uniquely associated as His exclusive mount. On the twelfth day, the renowned Garuda Sevai takes place—one of the most revered events in Vaishnavite tradition. Sri Perumal on Golden Garuda Vahanam with Twin Umbrella Sevai was most important day and sixteenth day would be that of highly devotional Vennai Thazhi Utsavam, which is sanctified in few Divya Desams. But Mannargudi utsavam alone has this rare and the most personal devotee service offered fresh butter types directly by the devotees into Sri Rajagopalan's Thirumeni. This is a rare gesture of direct giving and its significance is the devotee is very close to Sri Krishna, it is only this that reflects Mannargudi's Unique spiritual culture.

The Chariot Festival, celebrated on Panguni Rohini, marks the Thirunakshatram (birth star day) of Sri Vidhya Rajagopalaswamy and is the most prominent festival of the temple. It is celebrated during the Tamil month of Panguni (March–April); devotees pull a chariot round the streets of Mannargudi. Verses from the Nalayira Divya Prabandham are recited by a group of temple priests and music made with nagasvaram (pipe instrument) and tavil (percussion instrument) is played. In addition to the Panguni Brahmotsavam, the temple observes several other important festivals throughout the Tamil calendar. Chithirai (April–May): Chithirai Kodai Utsavam, a spring festival consisting of processions and special alankarams is celebrated in the temple during Chithirai. Garuda Sevai is the main festival Sri Rajagopalan is taken in procession on the Golden Garuda Vahanam around the streets on Akshaya Tritiya, most important day for the Vaishnavites. Vaikasi (May–June): In this month the temple observes Vasanthotsavam. The feast is dedicated to him and features daily processions with flowered Dress and Concluding with the Udhaya Garuda Sevai. Aani (June - July) is celebrated by floating festival, Theppotsavam. Theppam (float procession) is the main feature of the festival, which takes place at Haridra Nadhi Teppakulam (temple-tank).

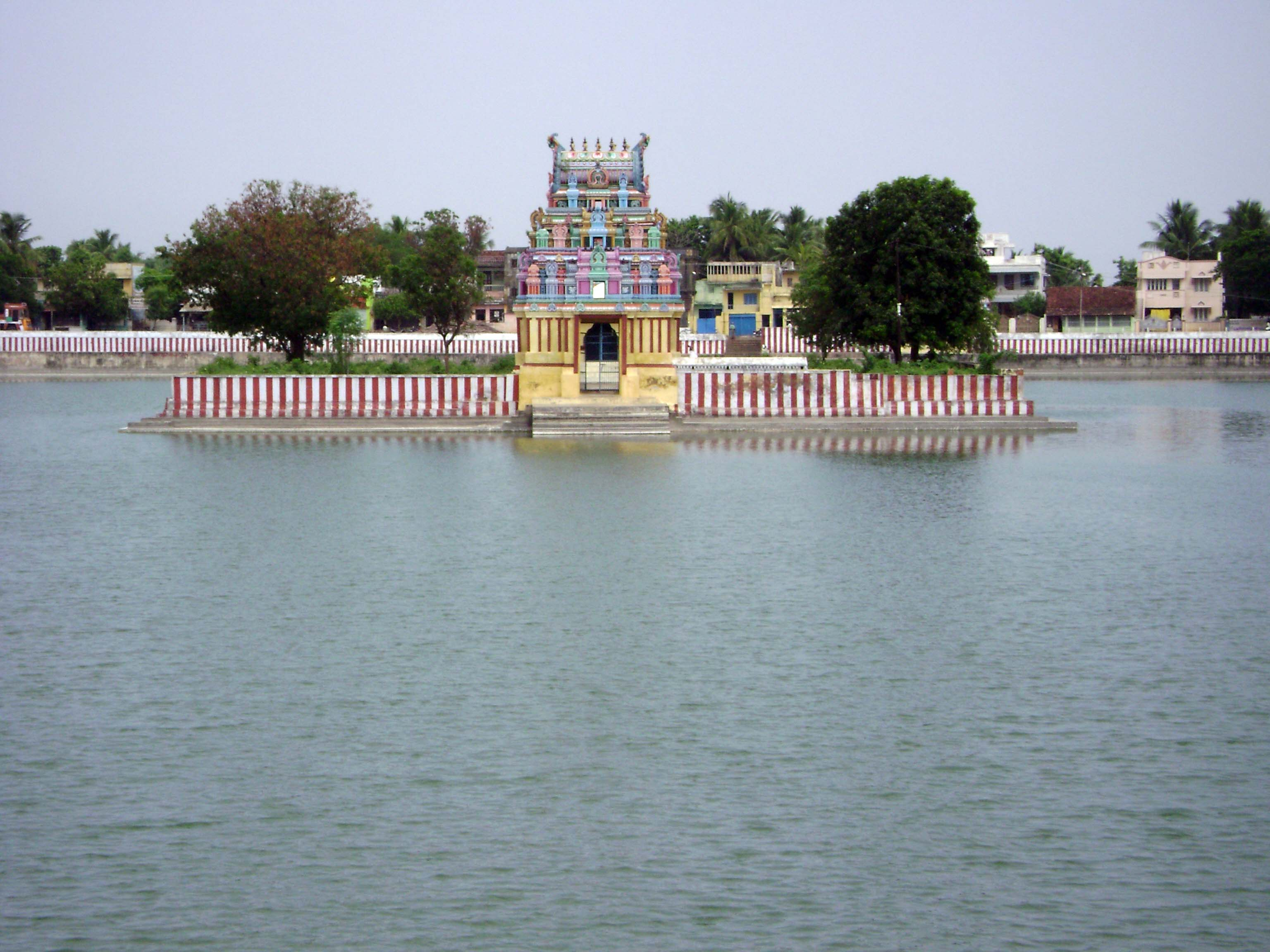
Haridra Nadhi Teppakulam

In the Tamil month of Aadi (July–Aug), observing two important festivals Thiruvadipooram Brahmotsavam and Jyeshtabhishekam. The Thiruvadipooram Sri Thayar Brahmotsavam is celebrated in honor of Sri Sengamala Thayar's Thirunakshatram (Pooram also known as Purva Phalguni), during Utsavam Thayar was venerated in the form of Andal, considering Sri Rajagopalan as Raja Mannar, reflecting divine wedding theme central to Vaishnavite devotion. Alongside this Jyeshtabhishekam is performed, during Thirumanjanam the Swarna Kavasam (golden armor) of deity was removed, offering the Nijaroopa Darshanam to pilgrims. The Tamil month of Aavani (Aug–Sep) is marked by two important observances: Uriyadi Utsavam and Thirupavithrotsavam. In connection with Sri Krishna Jayanthi, (Uriyadi Utsavam) the playful act of breaking butter pots was celebrated. Following this Thirupavithrotsavam is conducted for ten Days as a sacred purification rite. The festival includes homams (sacred fire offerings), Pavithra Samarpanam (adorning the deities with sanctified threads), and culminates with the Theerthavari. Purattasi (Sep–Oct): Navaratri Utsavam, a significant festival dedicated to Sri Sengamala Thayar, Celebrated with Raksha Bandhan rituals. On Vijayadasami Sri Rajagopalaswamy mounted on the Golden Horse Vahanam, followed by a ceremonial ambhu poduthal. Aippasi (Oct–Nov): Deepavali Kolatta Utsavam, a ten-day festival held in connection with Deepavali. The event features Kolattam performances by children, devotional music, and lamp lighting throughout the temple. In the month of Karthigai (Nov–Dec) the temple observes the Karthikai Deepotsavam, coinciding with the sacred Karthikai Deepam, an important festival in Tamil Vaishnavite tradition. A prominent feature of the festival is the ceremonial lighting of the Sokkappanai, a towering structure made from dried palm stems. Margazhi (Dec–Jan): Adhyayana Utsavam, one of the important festival in Vaishnavite tradition. Festival continued for 21 days, Pagal pathu and Ra Pathu. During all the days, Hymns from Nalayira Divya Prabandham.

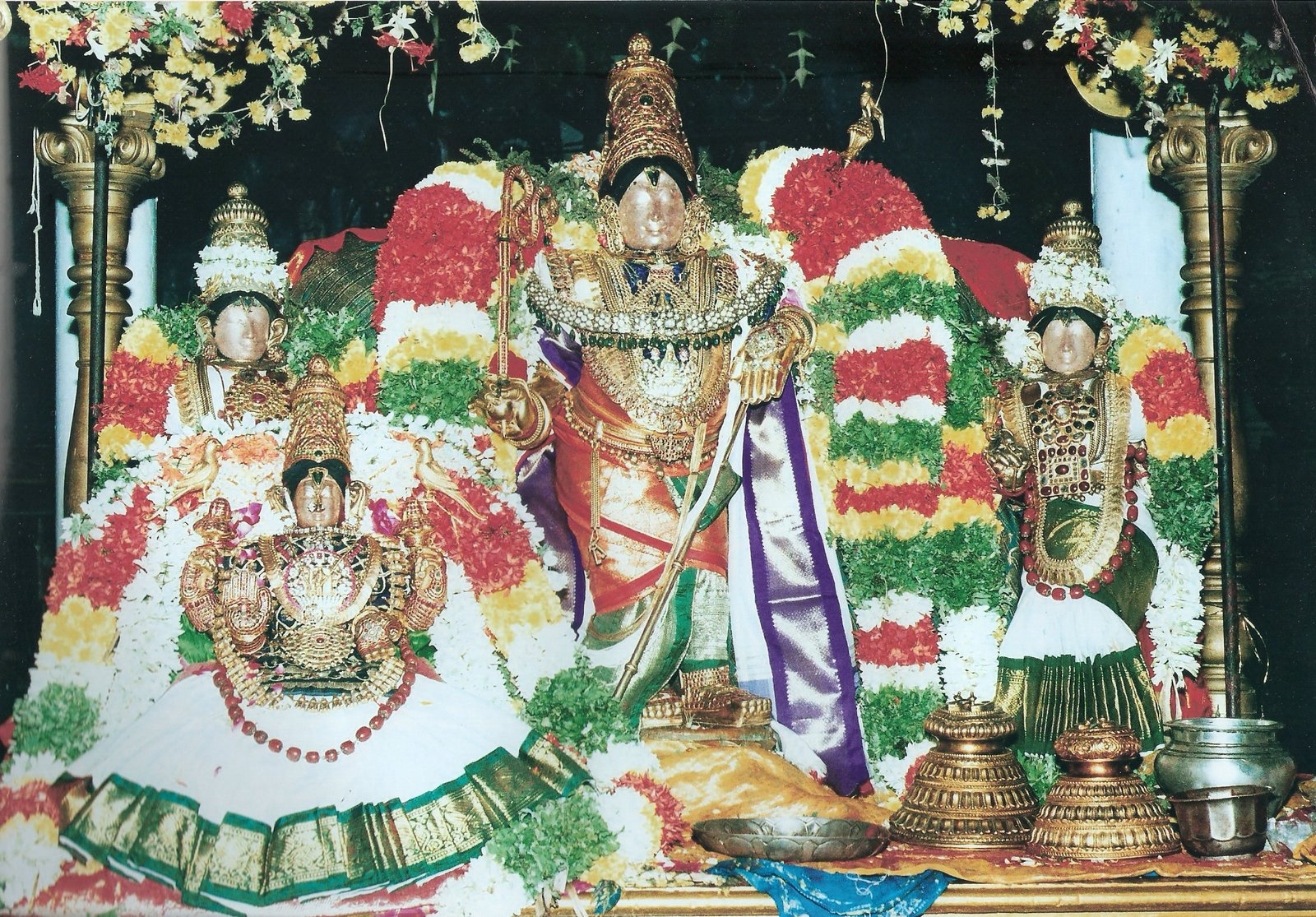
Ekasimmasanam Sevai

Thai (Jan–Feb): Temple celebrates Thai Utsavam with a series of events. It begins with the Makara Sankranti Theerthavari and Perumal Procession. Next day, Sri Sengamala Thayar with Kanu Procession, during evening Perumal with Kanu Paarivettai in Golden Horse Vahanam. On the third day Pranaya Kalahotsavam and on fourth day Ekasimmasanam Serthi unjal sevai. The 10-day Adhyayana Utsavam for Sri Sengamala Thayar is also celebrated in this month. The Thirunakshatram of Moolavar Sri Shenbagalakshmi Thayar falls on the Thai Poosam, celebrated with Special thirumanjanam and Theerthavari. Maasi (Feb–March): The Kannadi Unjal Sevai also known as Maasi Dolotsavam is the principal festival of this month. During this utsavam Maasi Magham Theerthavari is celebrated at Haridra Nadhi. These festivals deeply rooted in Vaishnavite tradition, reflect the spiritual and cultural significance of Sri Vidhya Rajagopalaswamy Temple throughout the year.

== Religious importance ==
The verse numbered 3295 in Nalayira Divya Prabandham part of Thiruvaimozhi, appearing in Fourth Centum, Sixth Decade and Tenth Verse, composed by Nammazhvar. In the traditionally (Thiruvaimozhi Vyakhyanam – Eedu), this corresponds to section 4-6-10.

unniththu maRRoru dheyvam thozhAL avanai allAl

num ichchai solli num thOL kulaikkap padum annaimIr!

mannap padu maRai vANanai vaN thuvarApathi

mannanai Eththumin Eththudhalum thozhudhAdumE

This particular verse of Thiruvaimozhi was reverentially offered at the Mannargudi Sri Rajamannar Temple by Manavala Mamunigal, a revered Sri Vaishnava acharya. The location associated with this recital is the Dakshina Dwaraka (Southern Dvaraka) of the temple. There is also a belief that in this Thiruvaimozhi pasuram, Nammazhvar may have actually directed his praise towards the presiding deity of Mannargudi; however, the temple is traditionally regarded as an Abhimana Sthalam. Swami Manavala Mamunigal is also composition of the Sri Gopāla Vimśati, offered in praise of Sri Vidya Rajagopalaswamy and Sri Kamala Stuti, dedicated to Sri Sengamala Thayar, the divine consort of Sri Rajagopalan. This stuti extols the benevolence, compassion and supreme grace of the goddess. In these stotras, Mamunigal glorified Sri Vidya Rajagopalaswamy and Sri Sengamala Thayar, emphasizing the sacred significance of Mannargudi as their divine abode.

Thirumangai Alvar is believed to have built the tall flag post outside the temple with the help of cotton bales. He also is believed to have sung praises about the presiding deity, but the songs were lost with time. The other Alvars who are believed to have visited the temple at various periods were seemingly lost in memory under the beauty of the presiding deity and were at loss of words. Sri Purandara dasaru, a Kannada Hari dasa, known as Pithamaha of Carnatic music had visited this place and glorified the God by composing a Kannada song " Kande Mannaru Krisha na" and "Mannaru Krishnanege Mangala". He is from Vijaya nagara empire. Even Sri Vijaya Dasaru also has composed song on this God.
