= Odampokki River =

River in Tamil Nadu, India

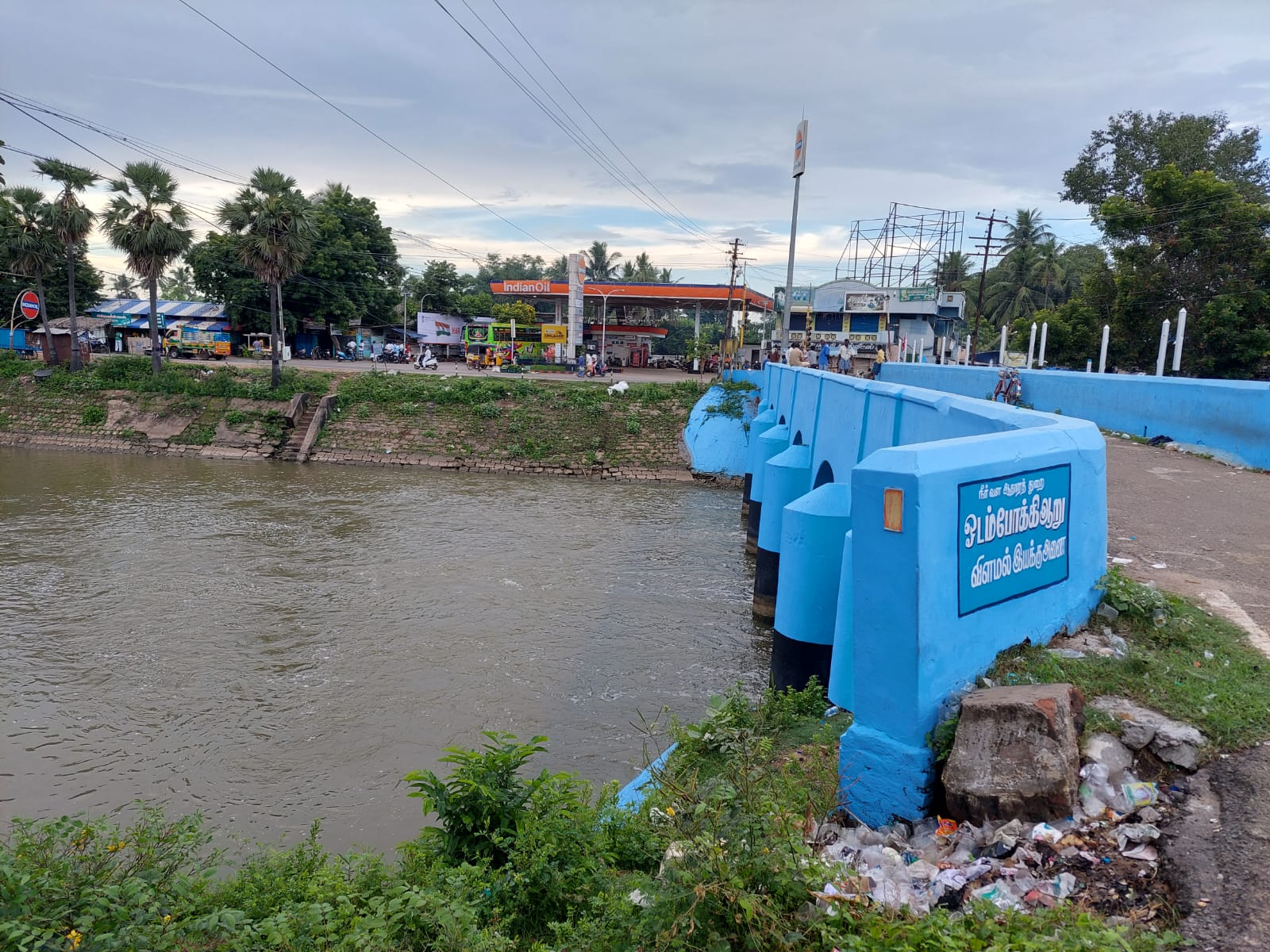
Odampokki river

Odampokki is a distributary of Vettar River flowing in the Tiruvarur district of the Indian state of Tamil Nadu. This river originates near the Engan village and passes through Thiruvarur town. Valavaikkal River branches off from Odampokki river near Ammaiyappan village.

== See also ==
List of rivers of Tamil Nadu
