= Kadathur, Tiruppur =

Kadathur
- Village
- Location in Tamil Nadu, India
- Coordinates: 10.61843°N 77.399956°E
- Country: India
- State: Tamil Nadu
- District: Tiruppur district
- Elevation: 325 m (1,066 ft)

Population (2011)
  - Total: 3,056

Languages Tamil, English
  - Official: Tamil
- Time zone: UTC+5:30 (IST)
- PIN: 642203
- Telephone code: 04252

Kadathur is a village in the Madathukulam Taluk of Tiruppur district in the Indian state of Tamil Nadu.

== History ==
Kadathur was part of Coimbatore District until 2008, when a new district Tiruppur district was carved out.

== Geography ==
It is situated on the banks of the river Amaravathi.

This village is surrounded by agriculture fields, coconut groves and Marutha (Arjuna) Trees.

== Landmarks ==
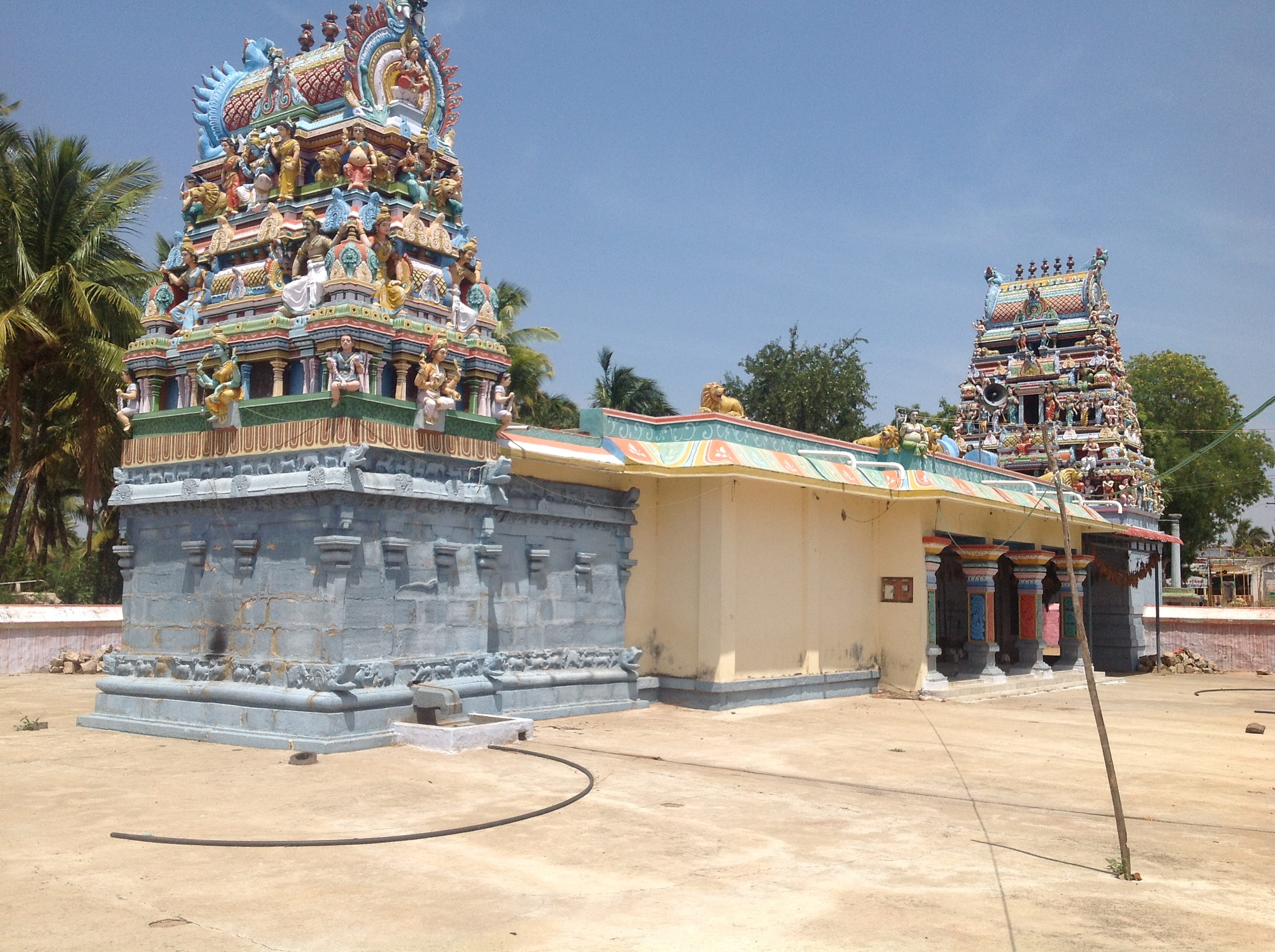
Temple of the Deity, Marudha Kaliamman. A small temple in Dravidian architecture style.

Arjuneswarar Temple's presiding Deity is Arjuneswarar, which is a tall Lingam.

== Transport ==
This village is situated approximately 20 km from Udumalaipettai and connected by town buses.
