= Kaundinya (disambiguation) =

Kaundinya may refer to:

- Kaundinya, the first disciple and arahant of Gautama Buddha
- Kaundinya I (Preah Thong), one of the legendary co-founders of the Kingdom of Funan
- Name of a famous rishi (seer) of Ancient India
  - Hindu Gotra or clan name, named after the rishi Kaundinya
- Koundinyasana, balancing posture in yoga
- Kaundinya River, a river in southern India
- Koundinya Wildlife Sanctuary, wildlife sanctuary and elephant reserve in Andhra Pradesh, India
- Kaundinyapur, village in Maharashtra, India

== See also ==
- Kondanna (disambiguation), Pali translation
