= Engan Brahmapurisvarar Temple =

Siva temple, Tiruvarur district, Tamil Nadu

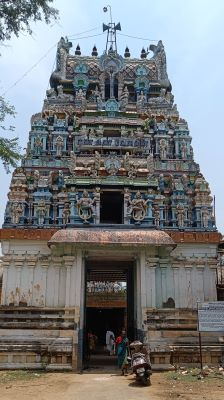
- Rajagopura of Engan Brahmapurisvarar Temple

Religion
- Affiliation: Hinduism

Location
- Location: Engan
- State: Tamil Nadu
- Country: India
- Interactive map of Engan Brahmapurisvarar Temple
- Coordinates: 10.81351°N 79.54254°E

Architecture
- Type: Dravida architecture

Engan Brahmapurisvarar Temple is a Siva temple located in Engan at a distance of 13 km. from Tiruvarur in Tiruvarur district of Tamil Nadu, India.

== Presiding deity ==
The presiding deity is known as Brahmapurisvarar and the Goddess is known as Periyanayaki. Vanni is the temple tree. The temple tank is Kumara tirtta.

== Muruga shrine ==
In this temple, the shrine of Muruga is considered as the primary shrine. The shrine of Muruga can be reached through the southern entrance of the temple.

== Other shrines ==
This temple is also known as Brahmeesvaram. It has rajagopura facing east and another entrance facing south. The shrine of the Goddess is found in the north of front mandapa. It has one prakara. In the kosta, Dakshinamurti, Ardhanarishvara, Brahma and Durga are found.

== Photogallery ==
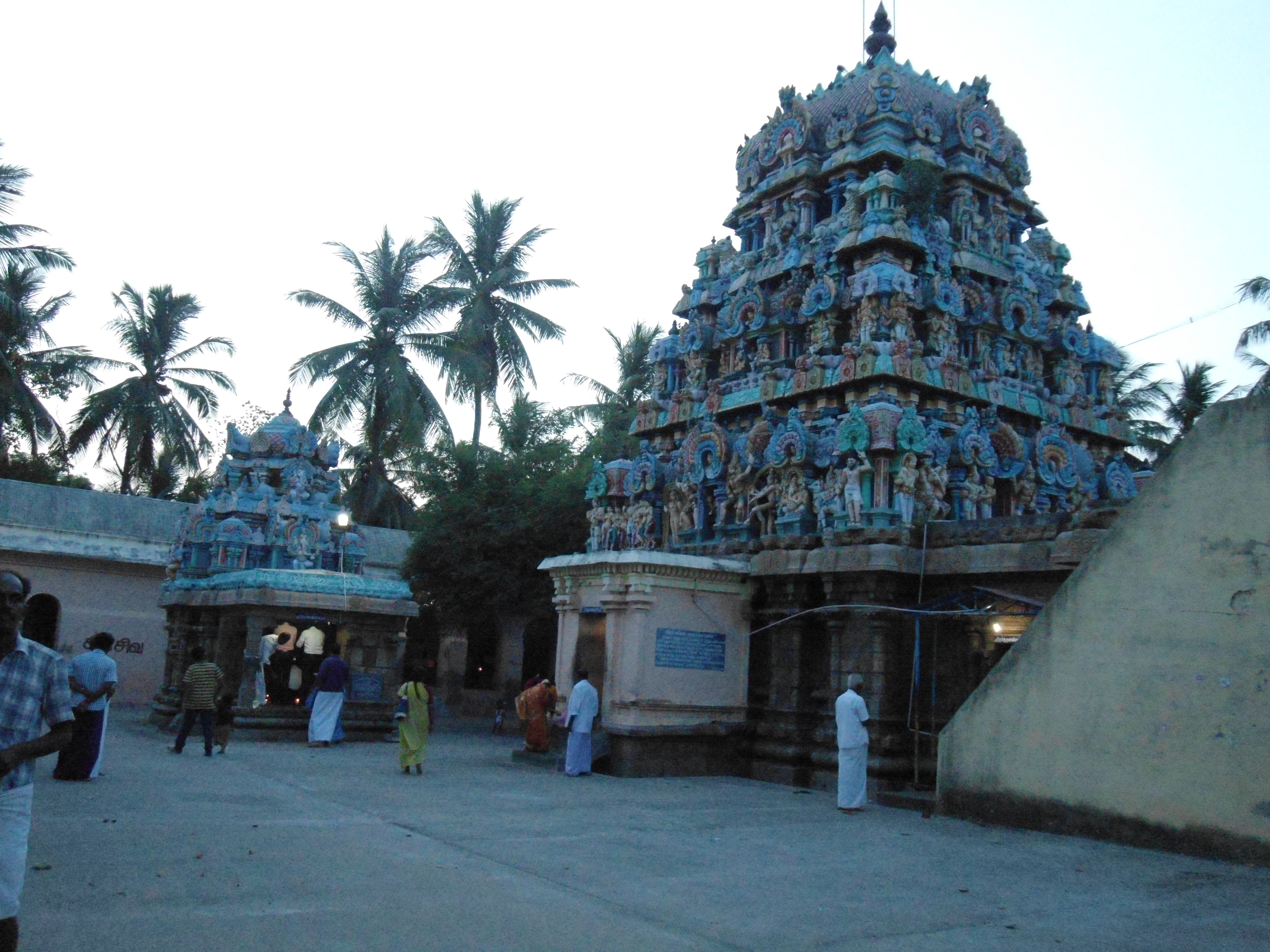
The temple complex

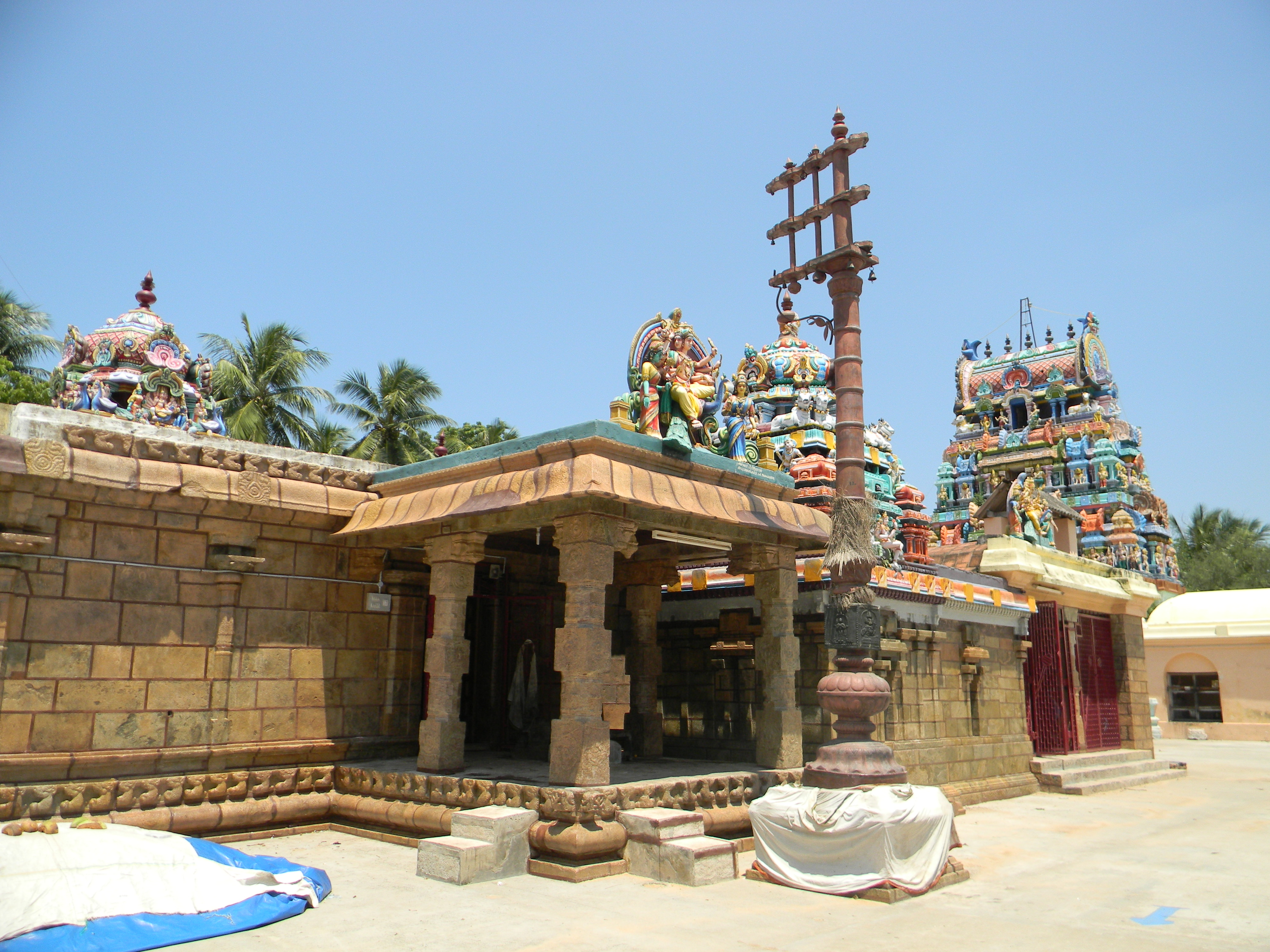
Another view of the temple

Southern entrance
