= Cnemaspis rashidi =

Scientific classification
- Kingdom: Animalia
- Phylum: Chordata
- Class: Reptilia
- Order: Squamata
- Suborder: Gekkota
- Family: Gekkonidae
- Genus: Cnemaspis
- Species: C. rashidi

Binomial name
- Cnemaspis rashidi Sayyed et al., 2023

Species of lizard

Cnemaspis rashidi is a species of diurnal, rock-dwelling, insectivorous gecko endemic to India. It is reported from Western Ghats of India and the species is found in Kottamalai near Rajapalayam, Tamil Nadu. It is one among the 94 species described in the genus Cnemaspis. It is known as Rashid's dwarf gecko since it is the smallest species of the genus Cnemaspis. The back side of the body is with attractive yellow, white and black colors. The total length from snout and vent is 2 inches.

== Habitat ==
Rashid's dwarf gecko is found at an elevation of 1245 meters of MSL.
