= Venjamakoodal =

Venjamakoodal (venjamangudalur)
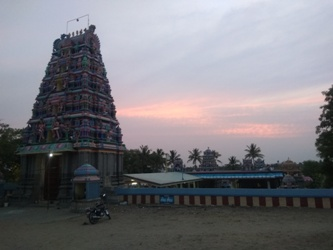

- Location in Tamil Nadu

Religion
- Affiliation: Hinduism
- Deity: Shiva

Location
- Location: Tamil Nadu, India
- State: Tamil Nadu
- Country: India
- Coordinates: 10°48′55″N 77°59′44″E

Architecture
- Type: Dravidian architecture

Located at Venjamangudalur near Karur, this temple is classified as one of the Kongu Naattu temples. Karuvoor Aanilai is another Shivastalam located nearby. The sanctum of this temple bears depictions of the 7 Thevara temples in Kongu Naadu.

== Legend ==
The temple is counted as one of the temples built on the banks of River Kaveri. Chitaru, joins Amaravati River and another tributary named Kudanganaru runs near the temple. Legend has it that a hunter king by name Venchan is said to have worshipped Shiva here and hence the name Venchamaakoodal. Shiva is said to have appeared in the guise of an old priest and blessed Sundarar with gold. The king of Devaas, Indiran, is said to have worshipped the Lingam here to get rid of his sins.

== Temple structure ==
This shiva temple is more than 1200 years old. This temple has a 5 tiered Rajagopuram. The presiding deity lord shiva is called as Vikriteswarar and the Ambal his consort is called as Vikritambika. Both the Shiva and the Ambal shrines face east. The main Lingam inside the sanctum sanctorum is 5 feet in height and the female deity's image is 2.5 feet in height. This shivasthalam has been patronised by the kings of Pandiya Naadu and many rock cut inscriptions of Pandiya Period have been found in this temple. There are shrines to the Panchalingams, Bhairavar, the 63 Nayanmars and others in this temple. The Theerthama is Vikrita Theertham.

== Poems on this temple ==
It is one of the shrines of the 275 Paadal Petra Sthalams. Sundarar composed the thevara Pathigam here. Arunagirinathar has also visited temple.

== Festivals ==
The annual Brahmotsavam is celebrated in the Tamil month of Maasi with processions on vahanams and the temple chariot.

== Location ==
To reach this temple, one has to travel south-west 16 km from Karur on the way to Aravankurichi until Thalapatti. Then go in a branch road about 10 km to reach "Venjamangudanur". The temple is located on the east bank of river Kudaganaaru.

== Photogallery ==
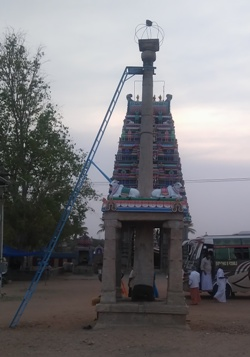
Front view

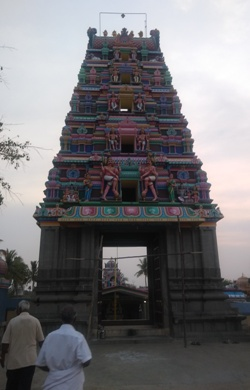
Rajagopuram

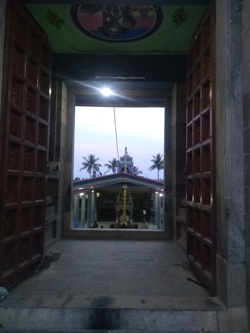
Entrance

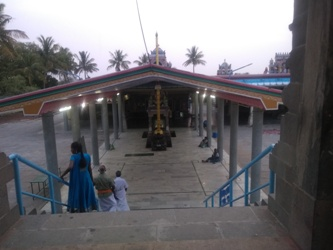
Frpnt Mandapa

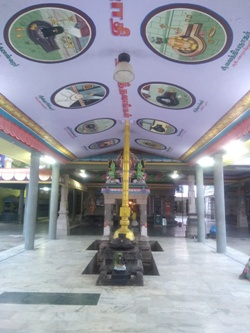
Flagpost

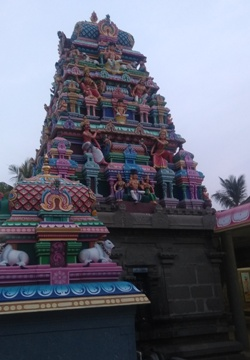
Vimana of the presiding deity

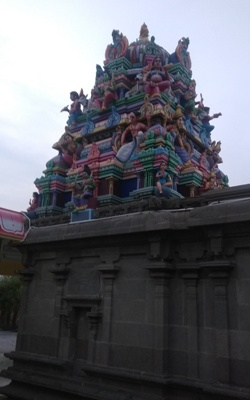
Vimana of the Goddess
