= Athoor =

Aathoor
- Town
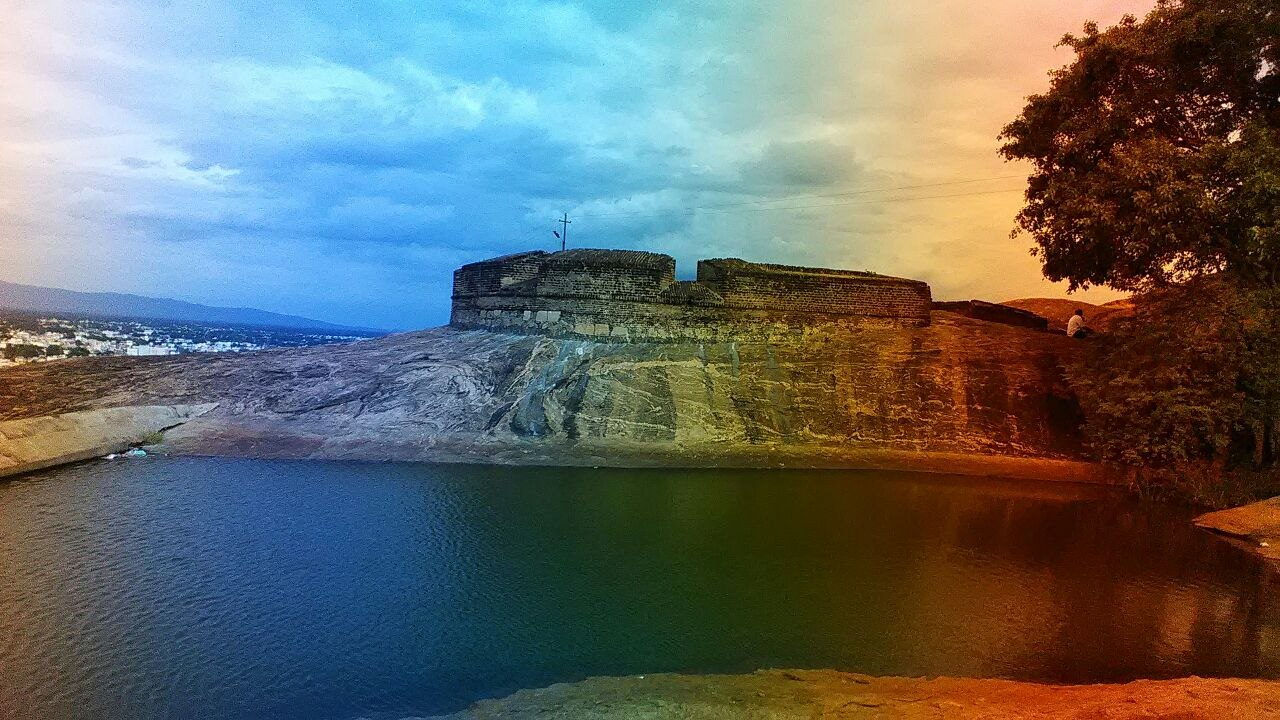

- Location in Tamil Nadu, India Aathoor (India)
- Coordinates: 10.2871°N 77.8532°E
- Country: India
- State: Tamil Nadu
- District: Dindigul

Population
  - Total: 15,300

Languages
  - Official: Tamil
- Time zone: UTC+5:30 (IST)
- PIN: 624701
- Telephone code: 0451
- Vehicle registration: TN-57
- Nearest city: Dindigul, Madurai
- Sex ratio: 10:9 ♂/♀
- Literacy: 83%%
- Lok Sabha constituency: Dindigul
- Vidhan Sabha constituency: Athoor
- Website: www.athoor.iwarp.com

Athoor is a town in the Dindigul district of India between Dindigul and Batlagundu about 3 km west of Sempatti. It is one of the legislative assemblies of Tamil Nadu. Rice cultivation is the major occupation.

Kamarajar Sagar Dam is situated in the west part of the town. The population is around 15,300. The Kodaganar River runs through the town, joining the Kaveri River. Athoor has a Catholic church which is about 50 years old, which contains a Roman Catholic Higher Secondary school.

Sadayandi Temple is situated in the hill caves. Every year during the month of Aadi, the temple hosts the Aadi Amavasai festival, which attracts thousands of people annually.

== Notable sites ==
Shri Kasi Vishwanathar temple, located in Athoor, is one of the oldest temples in the area. The temple is over 1000 years old, and many devotees in and around Athoor worship there. In December, the Karthikai Festival is celebrated in the temple.

Another temple in Athoor is the Shri Vandi Kali Amman temple. Once a year, a festival called 'Thirevela' is celebrated here. Another festival happens in the month of October.

Another church in Athoor is the Church of Our Lady of Assumption. The church was built by Fr. Clement Montaud SJ. The village has a sizeable number of Catholics.

== Geography ==
Kamarajar Dam at Kamarajar Lake is a 400-acre monsoon-fed lake 6 km west of Athoor village. Fishermen in their coracles on the lake and coconut and banana plantations and cardamom estates are the common sights on the surrounding hills.

The nearest towns are Dindigul (12.1 km), Nilakottai (14.5 km), Reddiyarchatiram (17.9 km), Vattalkundu (18.5 km).

Akkaraipatti, Alamarathupatti, Athoor, Bodikamanvadi, Chettiapatti, and Gandhigram, among others, are the villages along with this village in the same Athoor Taluk.

== Politics ==
Athoor Assembly constituency is part of Dindigul (Lok Sabha constituency).
