= Arichandranathi River =

River in Tiruvarur, Tamil Nadu, India

Arichandranathi River is a river flowing in the Tiruvarur district of the Indian state of Tamil Nadu.

== See also ==
- List of rivers of Tamil Nadu
