= Kannamangalam, Tiruvannamalai district =

Kannamangalam
- Panchayat town - District of Tiruvannamalai
- Location in Tamil Nadu, India
- Coordinates: 12.7522°N 79.1478°E
- Country: India
- State: Tamil Nadu
- District: Tiruvannamalai
- Nearest city: ARANI, Vellore

Area
  - Total: 1.90 km^{2} (0.73 sq mi)
- Elevation: 223.87 m (734.5 ft)

Population (2011)
  - Total: 7,399
  - Density: 3,890/km^{2} (10,100/sq mi)
- Demonym: Aranians

Languages
  - Official: Tamil
- Time zone: UTC+5:30 (IST)
- PIN: 632311
- Telephone code: 04173
- Vehicle registration: TN 97
- Sex ratio: 998 ♂/♀
- Lok Sabha constituency: Arani
- Vidhan Sabha constituency: Arani
- Avg. summer temperature: 40 °C (104 °F)
- Avg. winter temperature: 20 °C (68 °F)

Kannamangalam, previously referred as Mangalam is a panchayat town in Tiruvanamalai district in the Indian state of Tamil Nadu. It is located around 21 km from Vellore. Places with the suffix "mangalam" were believed to have been given as charity by the Kings of a particular reign, "Kannamangalam" was thus named by the same criteria. The Naganathi River, which passes through locality serve the water needs of the town during seasonal periods. Mudaliars and Muslims form the majority of the population in Kannamangalam town. Where as, Vanniyars are abundant in neighbouring villages.

== Demographics ==
As of 2011 India census, Kannamangalam had a population of 7399. Males constitute 49% of the population and females 51%. Kannamangalam has an average literacy rate of 75%, higher than the national average of 59.5%: male literacy is 83%, and female literacy is 67%. In Kannamangalam, 10% of the population is under 6 years of age.

== Schools and colleges ==
- Desia Matriculation Higher Secondary School. Kattukkanalur Village Panchayat
- Girls Higher Secondary School, Kattukkanalur Village Panchayat
- Government Higher Secondary School, Kattukkanalur Village Panchayat
- Vel's Vidhyashram Matriculation Higher Secondary School.
- Little rose nursery and primary school, Kilvallam.
- St Mary’s School of Nursing, Mttukudisai
