= Vettar River =

River in Tamil Nadu, India

Coordinates: 10°49′35″N 79°51′05″E

The Vettar River or Vettaaru is a river in the Kaveri delta that flows through the Thanjavur, Tiruvarur, and Nagapattinam districts of the Indian state of Tamil Nadu.

== Course ==
The Vettar is a distributary of the Vennar River, and begins northwest of Thennankudi at the Thenperambur dam in Thanjavur district. The Vettar branches off to the northeast, while the Vennar continues to the east. The river flows to the north of Melattur, before turning to the southeast as it passes to the south of Valangaiman. North of Koradacheri, it turns back to the northeast, passing to the north of Thiruvarur. A distributary of the Vettar, the Odampokki River originates near Engan village and flows through Thiruvarur. After passing Engan, the Vettar continues flowing to the east, through Nagapattinam district, before it empties into the Bay of Bengal in the town of Nagore near Karaikal Port

== See also ==
List of rivers of Tamil Nadu
