= Komugi =

Komugi (こむぎ, 小麦, コムギ) is a Japanese name meaning "wheat". It may refer to:

== Fictional characters ==
- Komugi (コムギ), a female character from Hunter × Hunter
- Inukai Komugi (犬飼こむぎ), the female protagonist of Wonderful PreCure!
- Musashi Komugi (武蔵 小麦), a male character from Hen Semi
- Nakahara Komugi (中原 小麦), a female character from The SoulTaker and the main character in Nurse Witch Komugi

== Locations ==
- Komugi River, a river in the Indian state of Tamil Nadu
