= Arjuneswarar =

Arjuneswarar Temple
- கோமதி அம்மன் உடனுரை அர்ச்சுனேஸ்வரர் திருக்கோவில்
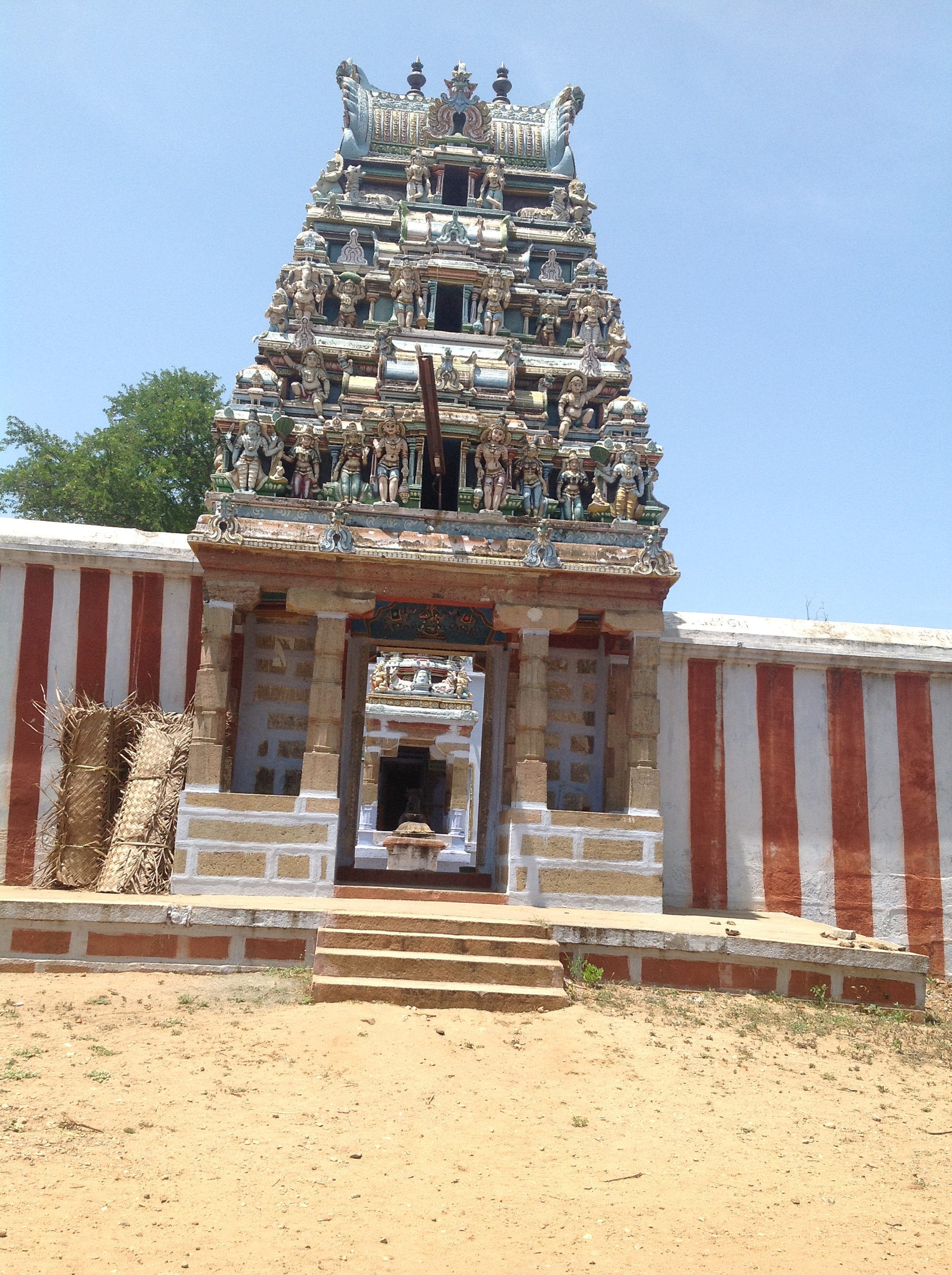
- Arjuneswarar Koil East

- Kadathur, Location in Tamil Nadu

Religion
- Affiliation: Hinduism
- District: Tirupur
- Deity: Arjuneswarar (Shiva) Gomathi Amman
- Features: Temple tank: Amaravathi River

Location
- Location: Kadathur
- State: Tamil Nadu
- Country: India
- Interactive map of Arjuneswarar Temple
- Coordinates: 10°37′14″N 77°23′56″E

Architecture
- Type: Dravidian architecture
- Creator: Cholas

Specifications
- Direction of façade: East
- Elevation: 325 m (1,066 ft)

Arjuneswarar Koil is situated on the banks of Amaravathi River in Kadathur village, in Tiruppur district.

The main deity, Moolavar in this temple is Arjuneswarar. The alternate names for the Moolavar are Marudheesar, Marudhudaiyar and Marundheesar. The consort of the main deity is worshiped in the name of Gomathi Amman.

== History ==
This lingam was buried under the roots of an Arjuna tree for a long time. Hence we can see the impressions of the roots of the tree on the body of the lingam. During the Mahabharatha time Pandavas had lived in the areas around Dharapuram a nearby town. It is a belief that during that period, Arjuna had worshipped this Linga. This is one of the reason's why the deity has been named Arjuneswarar.

In the nearby village called Karathozhuvu, there were many cattle. These used to visit the nearby village of Kaniyur which had lot of fruit bearing trees. On their way back to Karathozhuvu, these cattle were seen discharging the milk in their udder on the root of a Marudha Tree. The king of those time ordered the tree to be cut. When the root was cut, blood was seen oozing from the root and the Linga was discovered. The King removed the ring from his finger and arrested the blood. This can be still seen on the body of the Linga.

The temple was built during the Chola reign. The temple is being maintained by donations and grants from many people, who are native to this region. This temple is administered by the HR&CE of Tamil Nadu. The maintenance of the temple is done by the Arjuneswarar Trust.

== Special Features ==
Amaravathy River flows around the temple. In the morning sun's rays fall on the river and get reflected on to the Lingam. Two times in a year Sun's rays directly fall on the Lingam. The Gomathi Amman temple is on the right side of the Lord which is a special feature. Just like in Kashi, there is a cremation ground right in front of the Deity's sanctum.

The Gomathi Amman Sannithi is to the right of Moolavar. There is a large mound (Tamil: புற்று) near the entrance to the Amman Sannithi. Earlier, there was a wall between the Sivan and Ambal Sannithi.

The temple has a marble statue of Sri Dakshinamurthy, which was brought from Kashi. The temple has a separate sannithi for Lord Saneeshwara.
