= List of rivers of Tamil Nadu =

This article lists the main rivers which flow in Tamil Nadu. Out of the below rivers, Kaveri, Thenpennai, Palar, are the three largest rivers of Tamil Nadu followed by Vaigai River, Noyyal River, Cheyyar River, Then Pennai, Vellar River (Northern Tamil Nadu), Vellar River (Southern Tamil Nadu), Moyar River, Pampar River, Bhavani River, Thamirabarani River, Vaippar River are the major rivers in Tamil Nadu. (Listed in the order of longest rivers first). Sarabanga nadhi ( Idappadi) Nallaru ( Aninasi ) Kausika nadhi ( Periyanaickan palayam)

== A ==
1. Adyar River
2. Amaravati River
3. Ambuliyar River
4. Agniyar River
5. Arasalar River
6. Agaram Aru
7. Arjuna River
8. Ayyanarkovil River
9. Adappar River
10. Arani River
11. Agniar River - Tirupur

== B ==
1. Bhavani River
2. Bambar River

== C ==
1. Chittar
2. Coonoor
3. Cooum
4. Cheyyar

== G ==
1. Gadilam River
2. Gingee River
3. Gomukhi River
4. Goddar River
5. Gadananathi River
6. Guduvaiyar River
7. Gundar River

== H ==
1. Hanumannathi River
2. Harichandra River

== J ==
1. Jambunathi River

== K ==
1. Kallar River
2. Kamandala River
3. Kaveri River
4. Kedilam River
5. Kollidam River
6. Kodaganar River
7. Komugi River
8. Kaundinya River
9. Kowsika River
10. Kudamurutti River
11. Kundha River
12. Kottagudi River
13. Karipottan River
14. Kottagudi River
15. Karuppanathi River
16. Karunaiyar River
17. Kottamalaiyaru River
18. Kothaiyaru River
19. Kowsika River
20. Kundar River
21. Kaattar River
22. Kosasthalaiyar River
23. Kousika River
24. Kodayar River
25. Korai River

== M ==
1. Malattar River
2. Manimuthar River (tributary of Thamirabarani)
3. Manimuthar River (tributary of Vellar)
4. Thirumanimuthar River (tributary of Kaveri)
5. Manimuthar River (tributary of Pambar)
6. Mayura River
7. Moyar River
8. Mudikondan River
9. Markanda River
10. Mundhal Odai River
11. Mottaiyar River
12. Mullaiyar River
13. Manjalaru
14. Marudaiyaru River (Ariyalur)

== N ==
1. Noyyal River
2. Naganathi River
3. Nanganjiyar river
4. Nandalar River
5. Nattar River
6. Nallar River

== O ==
1. Odampokki River

== P ==
1. Pazhayar River
2. Pachaiyar River
3. Pambar River (Northern Tamil Nadu)
4. Pambar River (Southern Tamil Nadu)
5. Pahrali River
6. Palar River
7. Parambikulam River
8. Ponnaiyar River
9. Pykara River
10. Pandavaiar River
11. Pamaniyar River

== R ==
1. Rajasingiyaru River
2. Ramanathi River

== S ==
1. Samriti Shanmuganadhi River
2. Sigur River
3. Siruvani River
4. South Pennar River
5. Suvetha River
6. Sarabanga River
7. Sarugani River
8. Santhana varthini River

== T ==
1. Thamirabarani River
2. Thenpennai River
3. Tondiar River
4. Thirumalairajan River
5. Thennar River
6. Thirumanimutharu River
7. Thennar River

== U ==
1. Uppar River
2. Upper Gundar River

== V ==
1. Vaigai River
2. Vaippar River
3. Vanniyar River
4. Vennaaru River
5. Varaganathi River
6. Vashista River
7. Veera Chozhan river
8. Vellar River (Northern Tamil Nadu)
9. Vellar River (Southern Tamil Nadu)
10. Vedamaliyaru River
11. Vettar River
12. Vennar River
13. Valavaikkal River
14. Vari River
15. Vembar River
16. Vellanguruchi River

== See also ==
- List of Lakes in Tamil Nadu
