= Kaattar River =

River in Tamil Nadu, India

Kaattar is a river flowing in the Tiruvarur district of the Indian state of Tamil Nadu.

== See also ==
List of rivers of Tamil Nadu
