= Kundha River =

River in Tamil Nadu, India

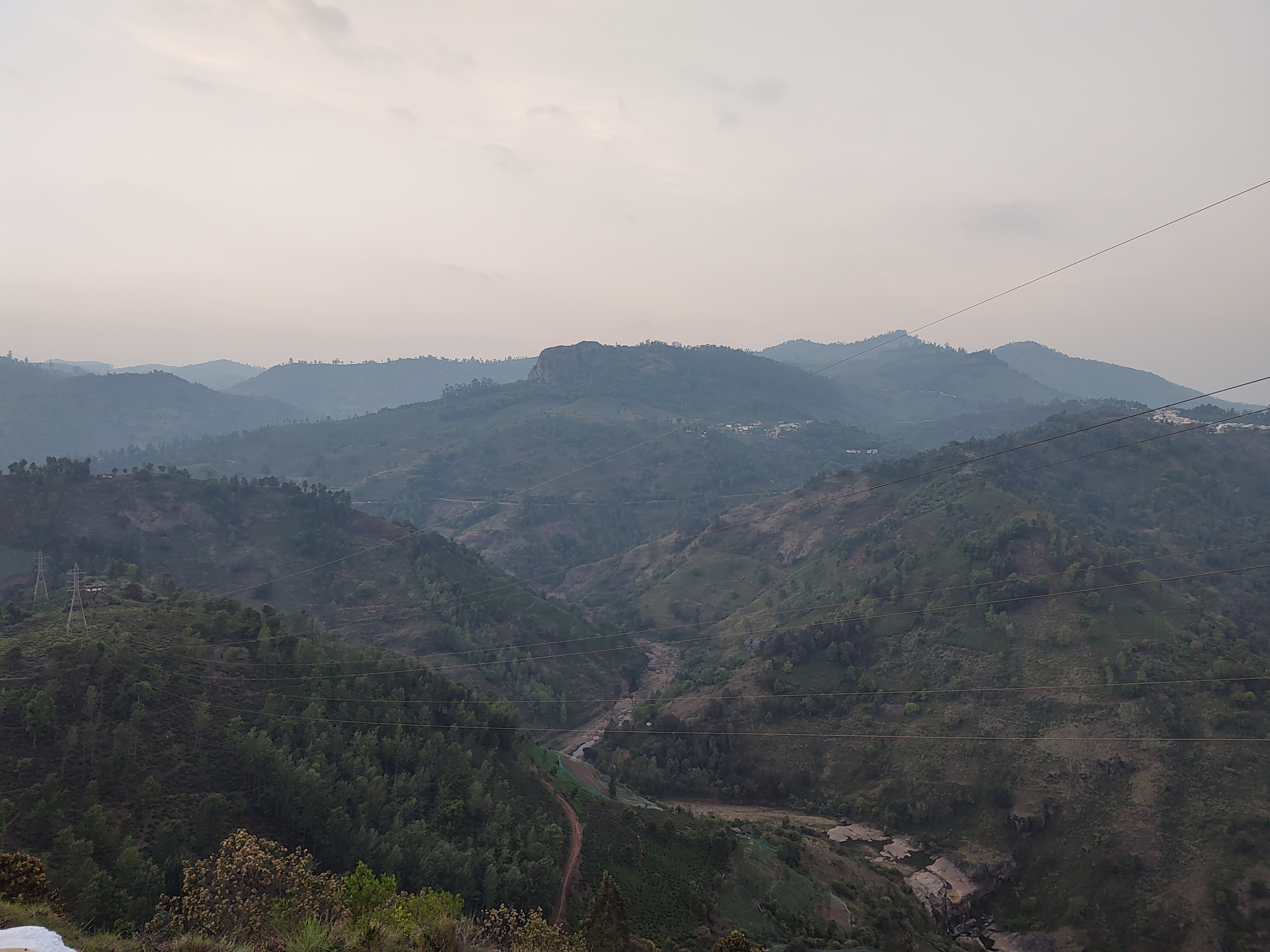
view of Kundha river

The Kundha River or the Kundah River, flows through the Erode district of the Indian state of Tamil Nadu.

The river is bisected by the Kundah Power House. These dams provide hydroelectricity to the area, but residents have raised concerns about the environmental impacts.

== See also ==
- List of rivers of Tamil Nadu
