= Goddar River =

Goddar is a river flowing in the Vellore district of the Indian state of Tamil Nadu.

== See also ==
List of rivers of Tamil Nadu
