= Nandalar River =

Nandalar Nandalaru

Location
- Country: India
- State: Tamil Nadu
- Region: South India
- Origin: Kumbakonam, Tamil Nadu

Physical characteristics
- Source
  - location: Kumbakonam
  - coordinates: 10°58′15.3″N 79°23′06.3″E
  - elevation: 20 m (66 ft)
- Mouth: Bay of Bengal
  - location: Tharangambadi, Mayiladuthurai, Tamil Nadu, India
  - coordinates: 11°01′07″N 79°51′20″E
  - elevation: 0 m (0 ft)
- Length: 60 km (37 mi)

Nandalar (நண்டலாறு) is a branch river of Cauvery River and flowing between Tiruvarur district and Mayiladuthurai district of the Indian state of Tamil Nadu. It act as a border line for Thiruvarur and Mayiladuthurai Districts.

== Etymology ==
As per the local peoples, Nandalaru => Nandu(Crab)+Kal(Rock)+Aaru Crab's Fossil in Rock found in this river. So this river got the name as Nandalaru.

== Origin ==
Nandalar is a branch of River Cauvery.Nandalar river split from Cauvery near Kumbakonam and it flown through Kumbakonam, Komal, Avazhikkarai, Nallaathur. It drained in Bay of Bengal between village Chandrapadi and Tharangambadi.

== See also ==
List of rivers of Tamil Nadu
