= Thoovanam Waterfalls =

Waterfalls in Kerala, India

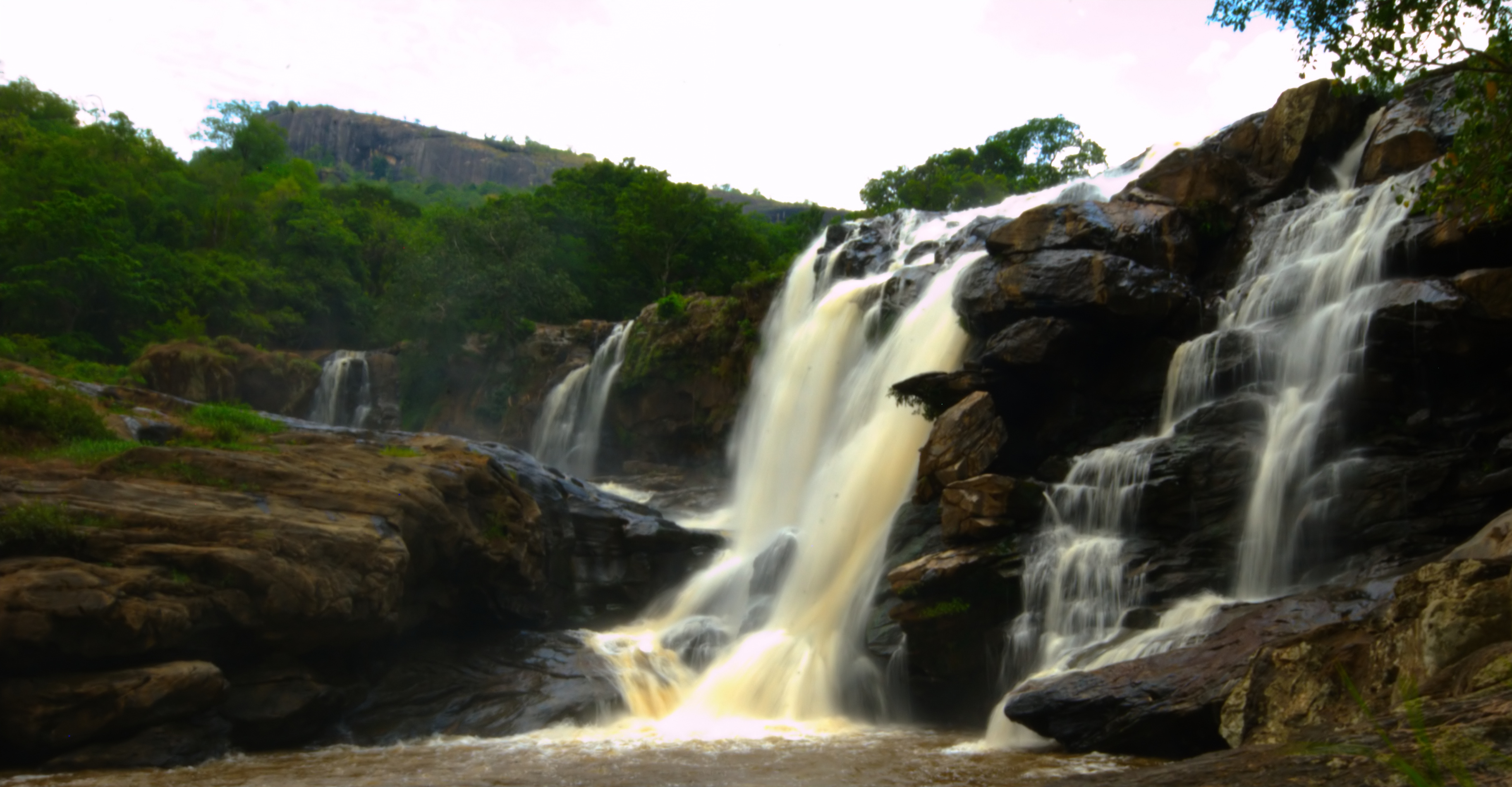
- Interactive map of Thoovanam Waterfalls
- Location: Munnar, Idukki district, Kerala, India
- Coordinates: 10.2871°N 77.1880°E
- Total height: 84 ft (26 m)

Thoovanam Falls is a waterfall located near Munnar, Idukki district, Kerala, India. It is located in within the Pambar river of Chinnar Wildlife Sanctuary at a distance of eight kilometers from the Marayur-Udumalai state highway. The waterfall falls from a height of 84 feet.

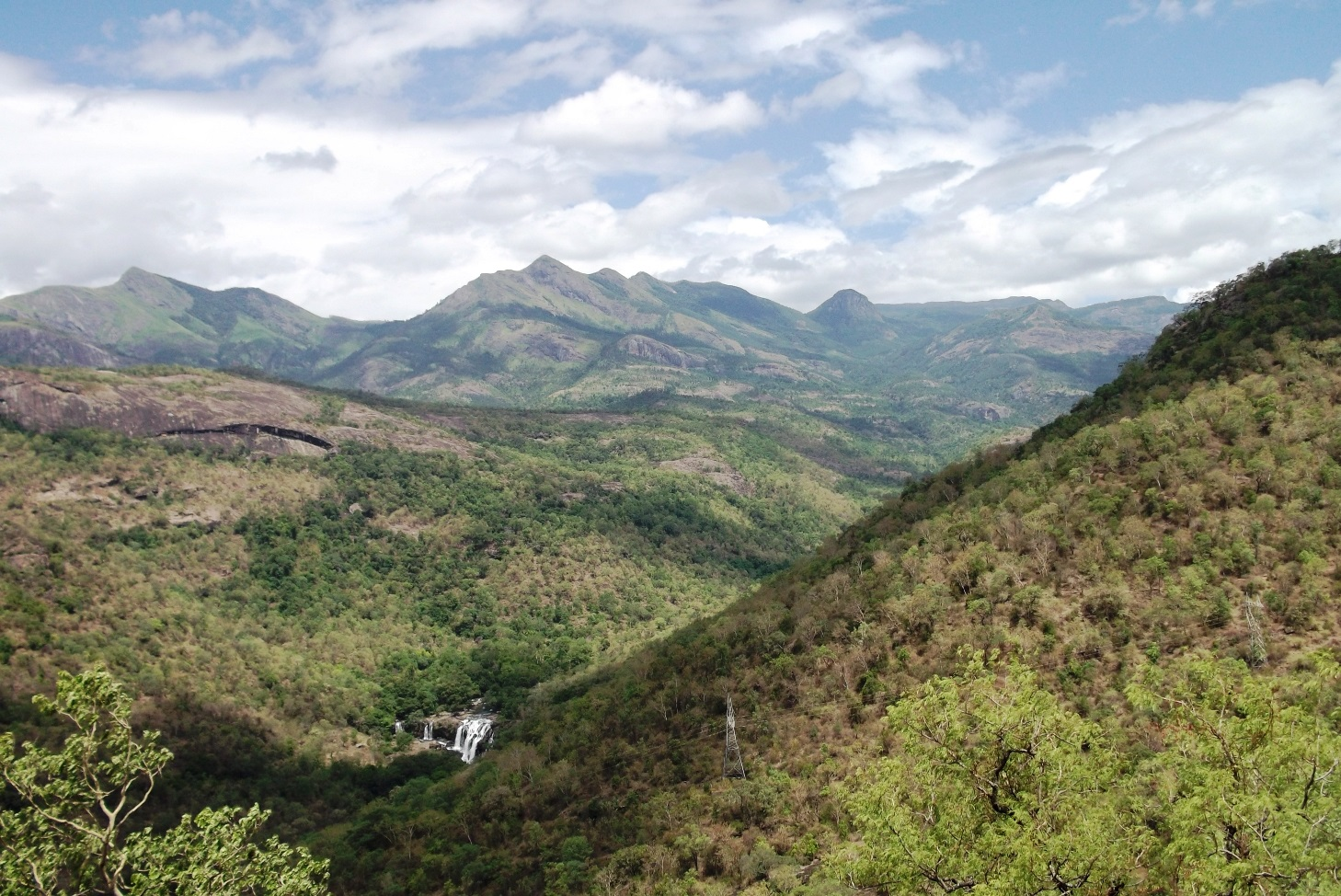
Taken from State Highway 17

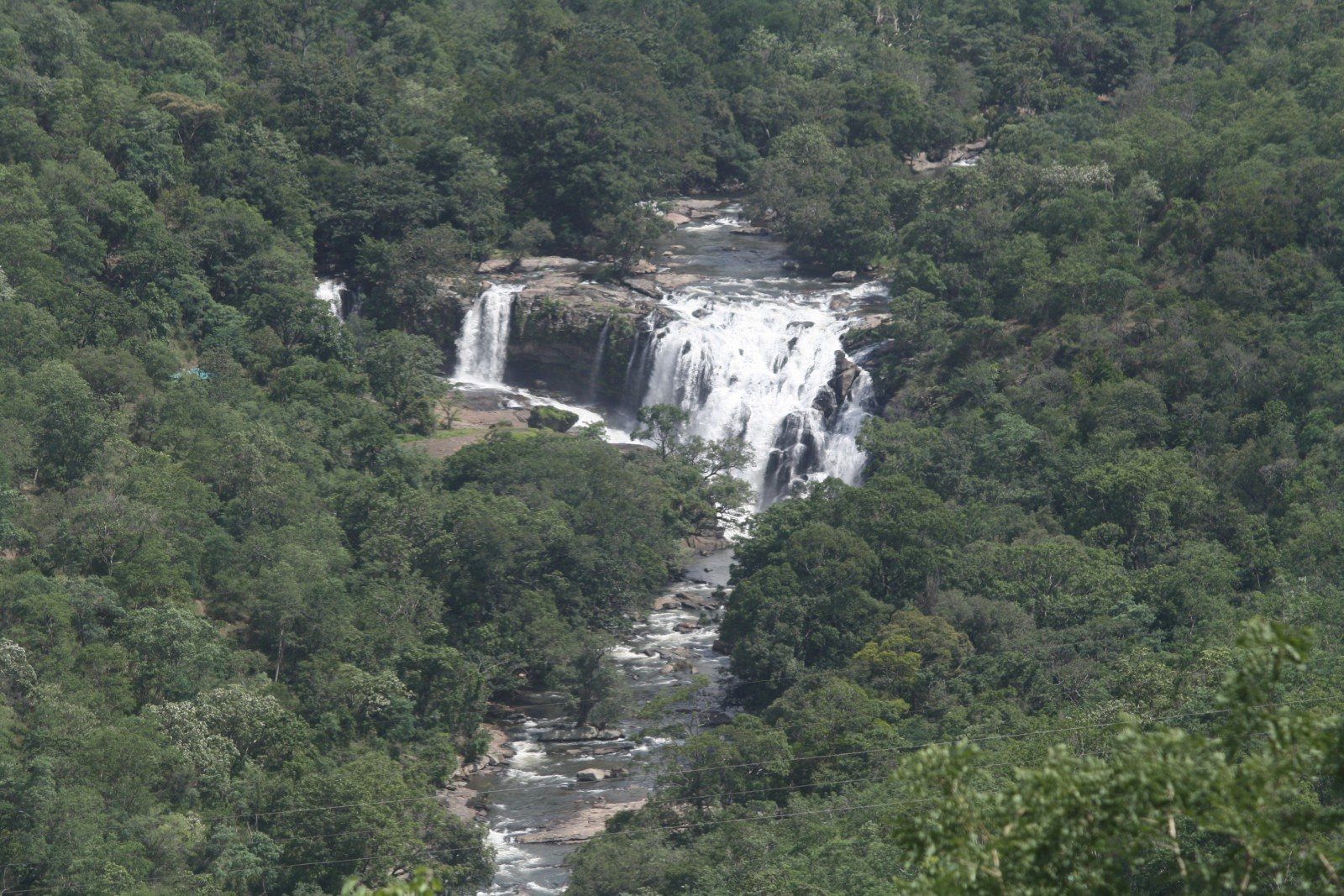
Taken from State Highway 17
