= Gundar River =

River in Tamil Nadu, India

Coordinates: 9°10′N 78°29′E

Gundar River flows through Madurai, Virudhunagar and Ramanathapuram districts of the Indian state of Tamil Nadu. The origin of Gundar is Sathuragiri hills, and it flows through Tirumangalam, Kamuthi and ends itself into Gulf of Mannar.

== See also ==
- List of rivers of Tamil Nadu
