= Upper Gundar River =

Upper Gundar is a river flowing in the Sivagangai district of the Indian state of Tamil Nadu.

== See also ==
List of rivers of Tamil Nadu
