= Kowsika River =

River in Tamil Nadu, India

Kowsika Mahanadi is a river flowing in the Virudhunagar district of the Indian state of Tamil Nadu.

== Flood ==
In 2006, a flood on the river had a significant impact on the lives of people living on the riverbank. River water entered the homes of residents near the river. There haven't been any major floods since 2006.

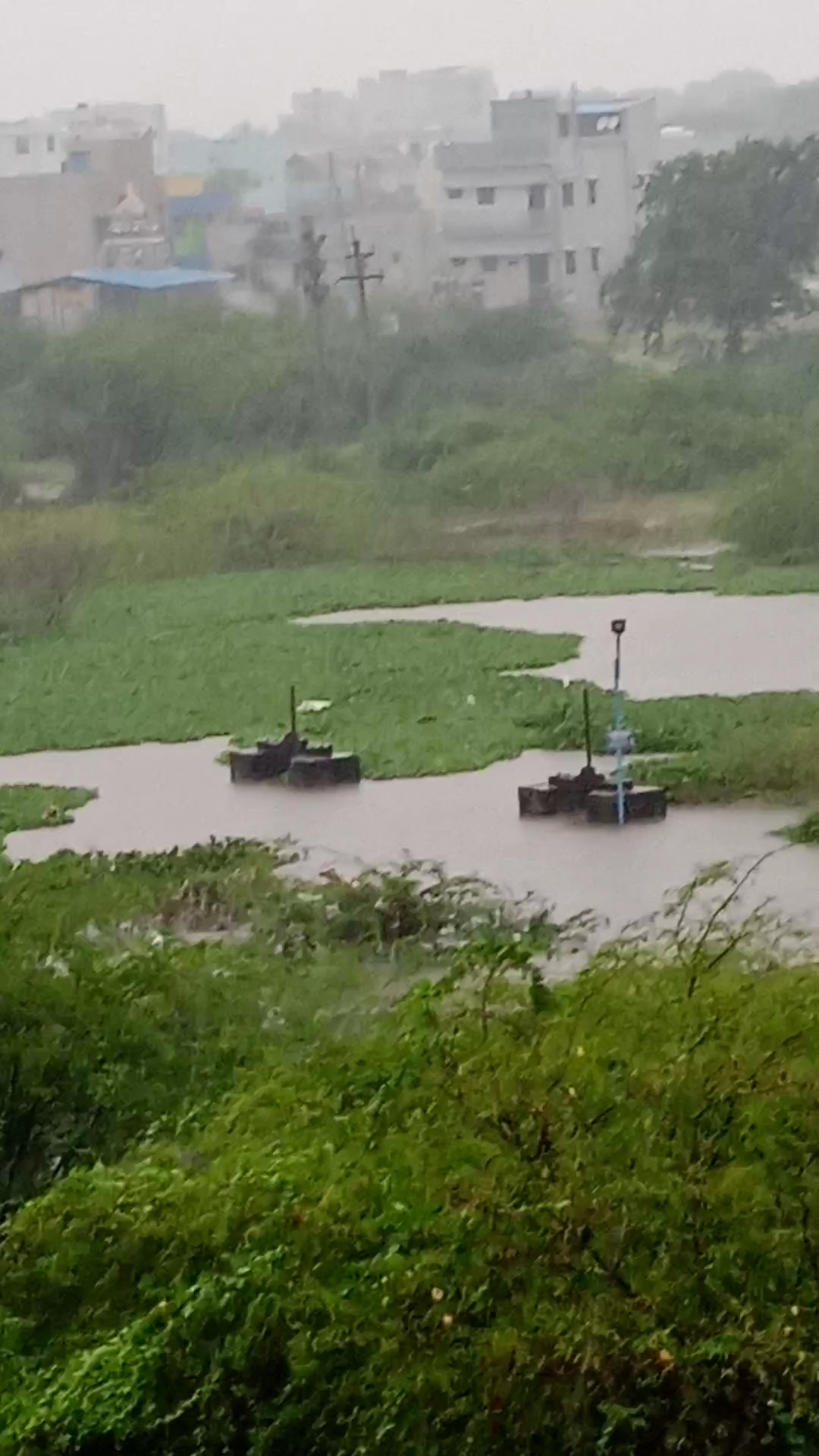
Kowsika Mahanadi river flood December 18,2023

== Project ==
Government has allot fund to clean & raise wall on both side of river bank to save Kowsika river in 2025.

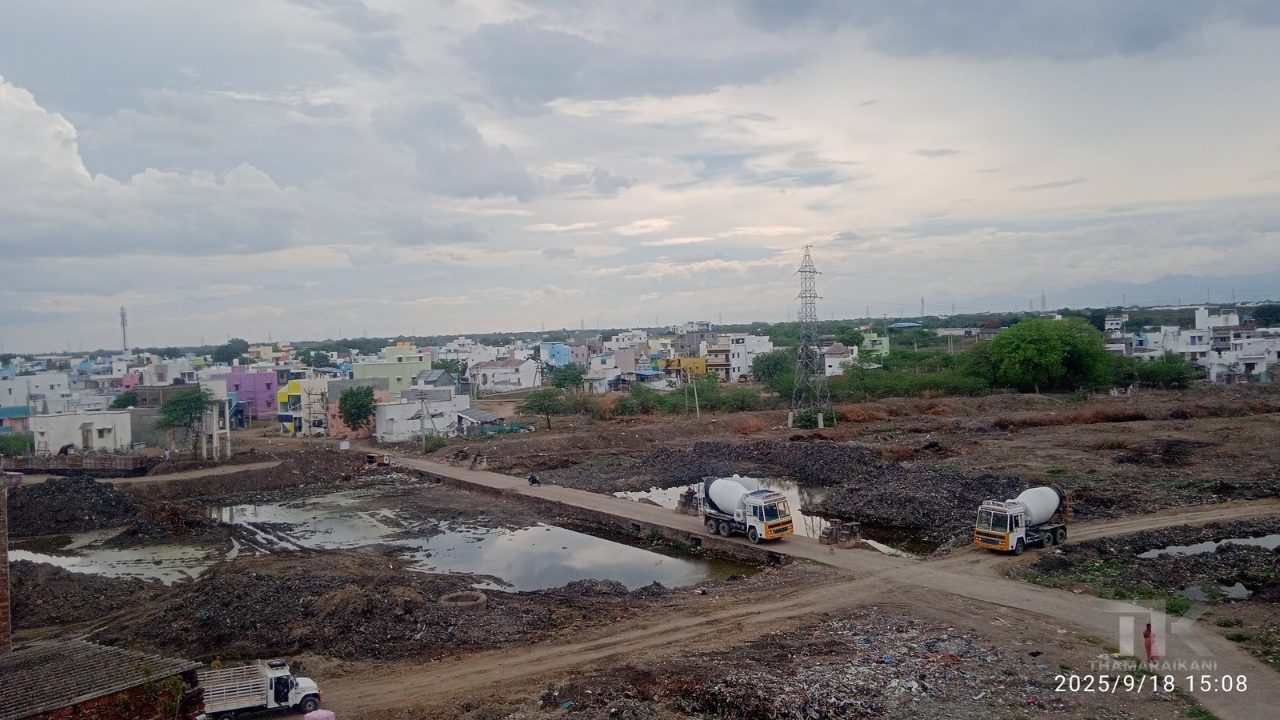

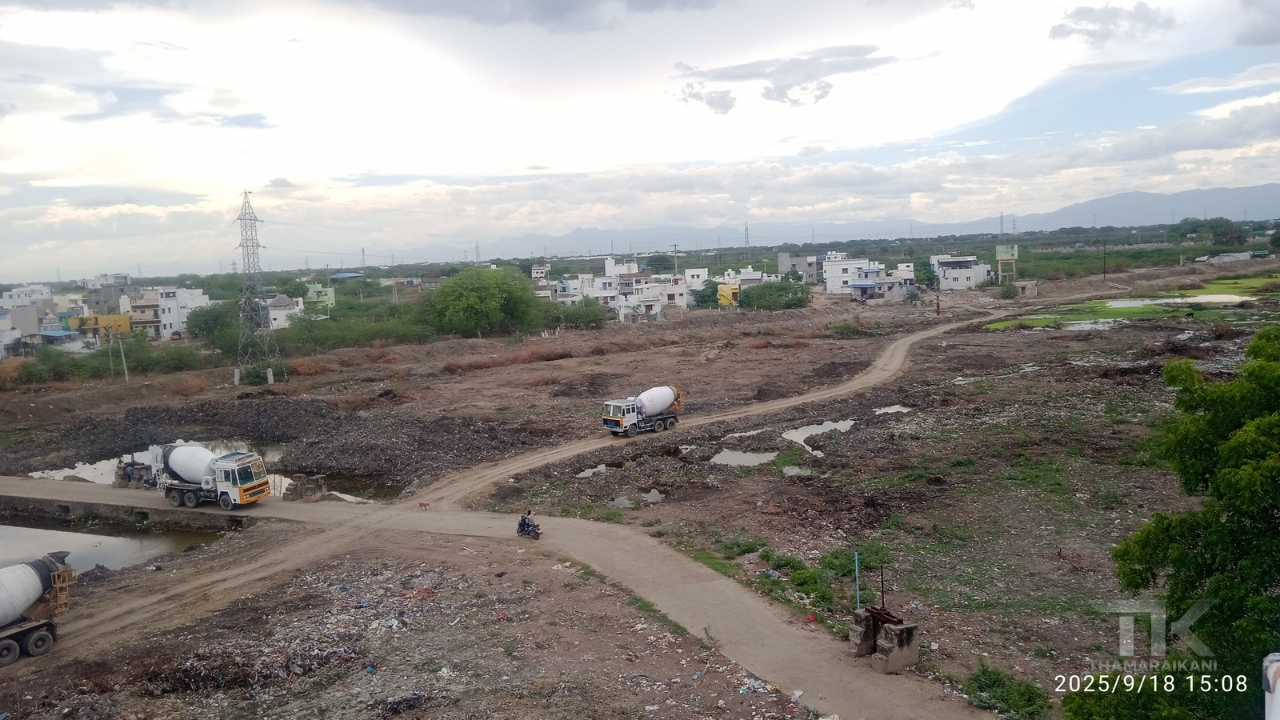
Construction work going on raising wall in both side of river bank

== See also ==
List of rivers of Tamil Nadu
