= Pambar River (Kerala) =

River in Idukki district of Kerala, India

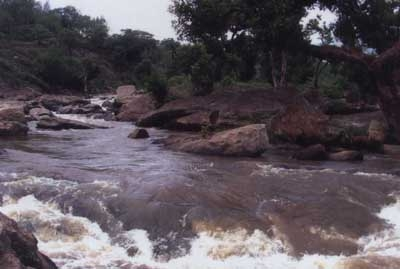

Location
- Country: Idukki District, Kerala, India

Physical characteristics
- Source
  - location: Talaiyar at
  - coordinates: 10°8′N 77°7′E
  - elevation: 2,073 metres (6,801 ft)
- Mouth
  - location: Amaravathi River at
  - coordinates: 10°21′2″N 77°14′14″E
  - elevation: 473 metres (1,552 ft)
- Length: ~31 kilometres (19 mi)

Pambar River originates near Anamudi in Idukki district of Kerala state in South India.

== Route ==
It traverses Turner's Valley in Eravikulam National Park and flows into the Chinnar Wildlife Sanctuary through the Taliar Valley between Kanthalloor and Marayoor Villages and eastwards through the sanctuary. The Pambar, Kabani and Bhavani are the only rivers of the 44 in Kerala that flow eastwards. It is joined by seasonal rivulets and a few perennial streams originating from sholas in the upper reaches.

The Pambar merges with the Chinnar River at Koottar. The Chinnar forms the interstate boundary along the northwest edge of the sanctuary and becomes the Amaravati River in Tamil Nadu, reaches the Amaravathi Reservoir and Dam and eventually joins the Kaveri River near Karur.

== Waterfalls ==
The spectacular Thoovanam Waterfalls lie on the Pambar River deep within the Sanctuary. This breathtaking cascade is a major tourist attraction. Guided trekking from Karimutti Forest Station can be arranged.

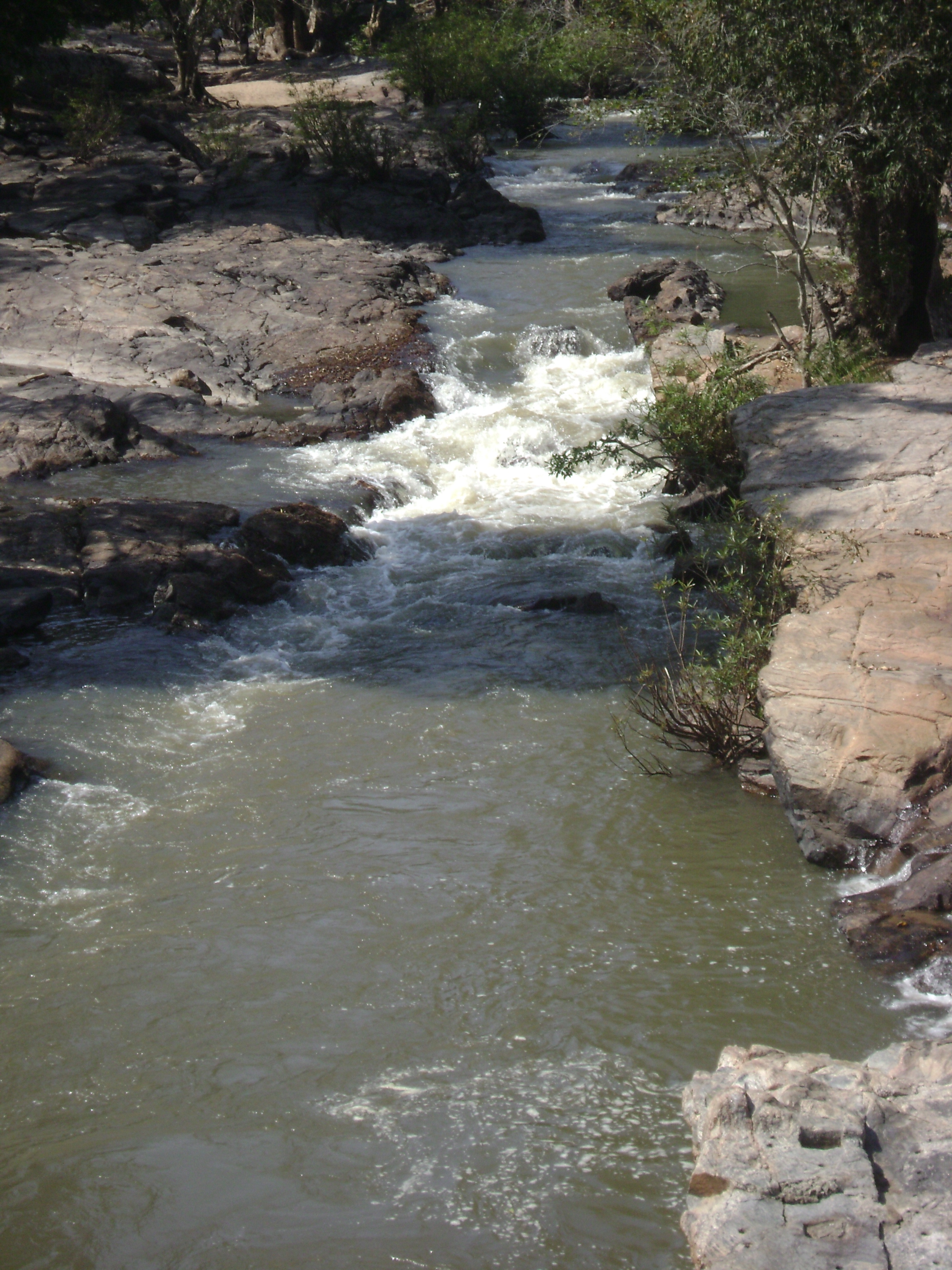
Pambar River near SH 17

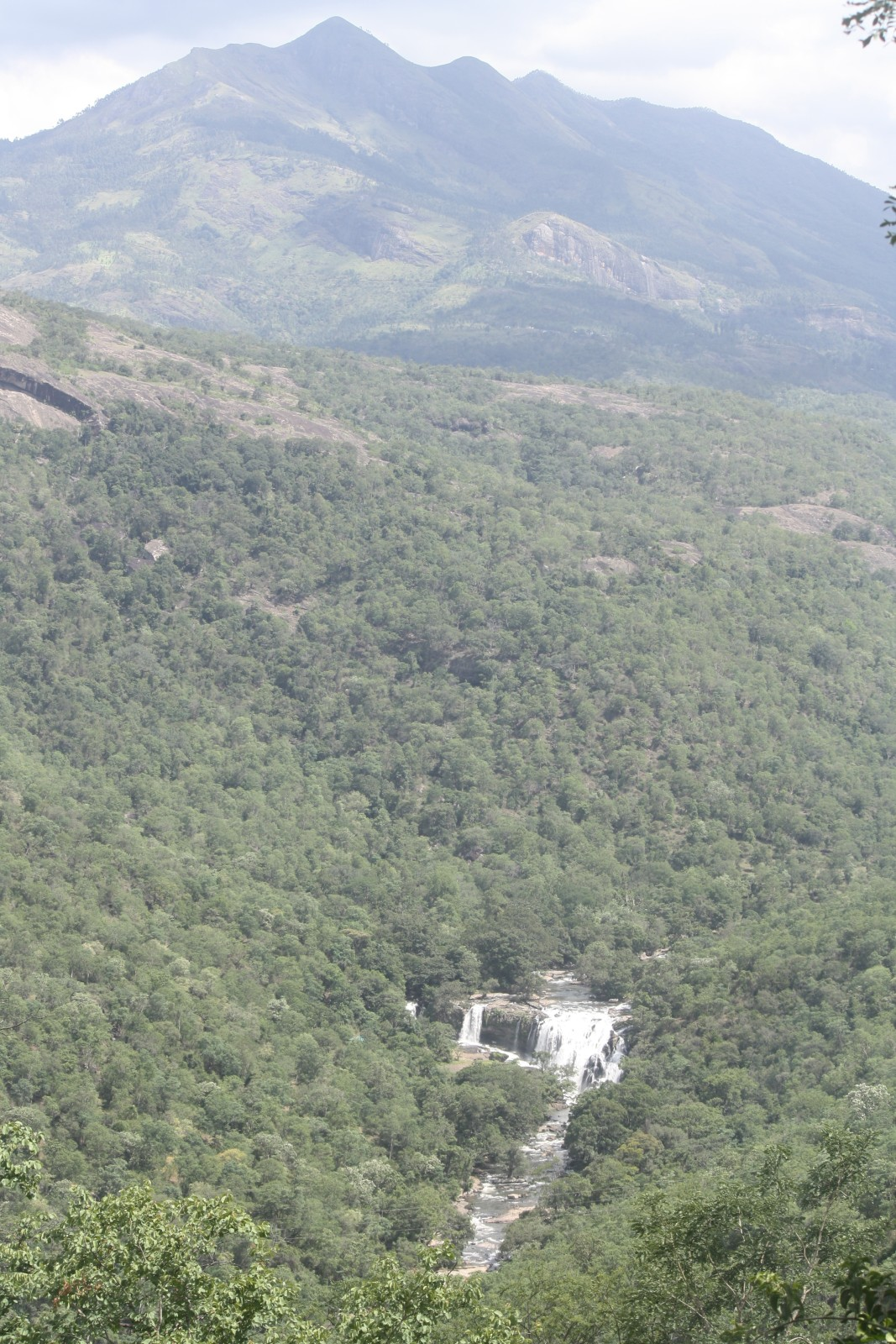
Thoovanam falls view from State Highway 17 in Kerala

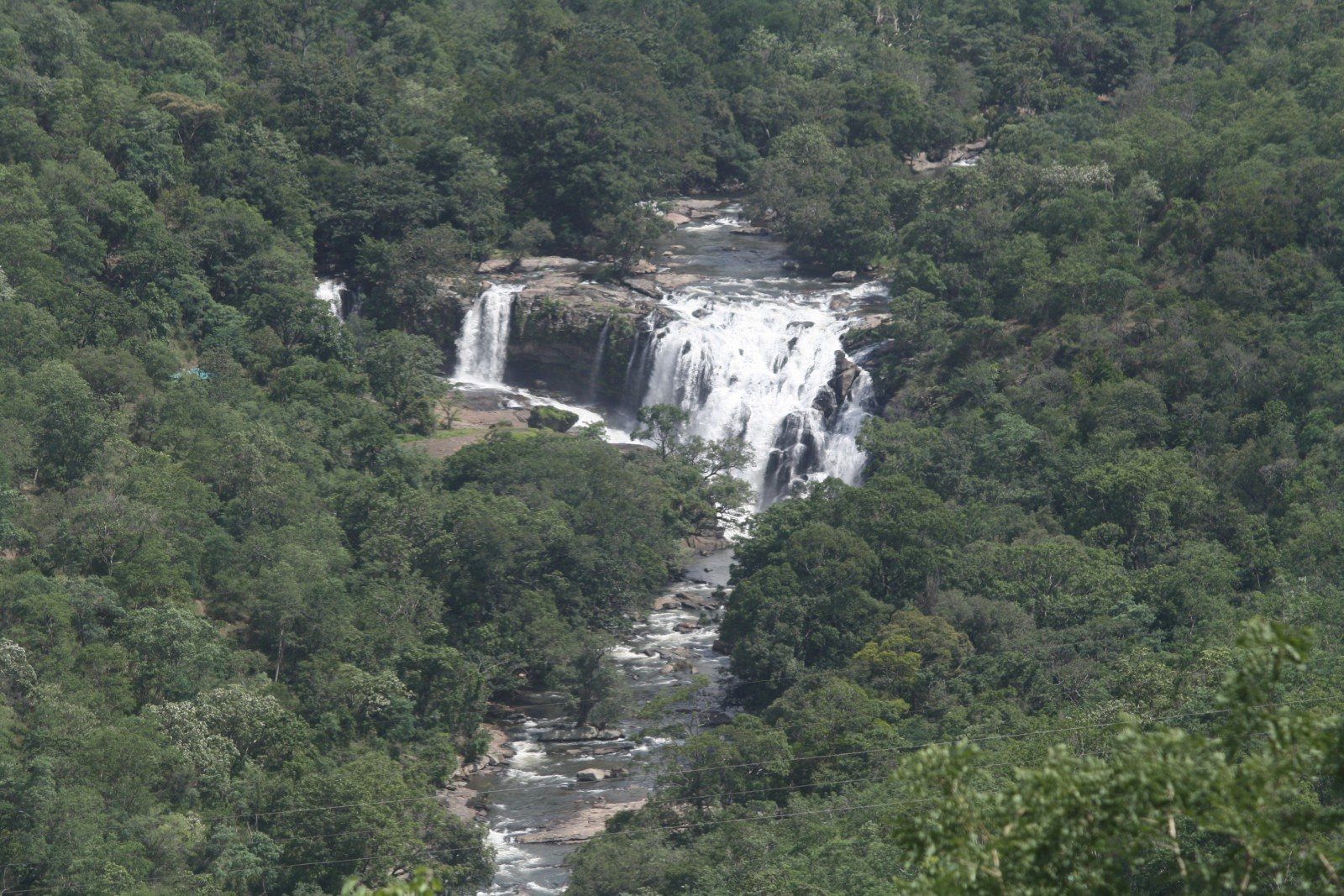
Zoom in view of Thoovanam falls
