= Bambar River =

River in Tamil Nadu, India

The Bambar is a river flowing in the Sivagangai district of the Indian state of Tamil Nadu.

== See also ==
- List of rivers of Tamil Nadu
