= Sarugani River =

Coordinates: 9°42′N 78°48′E

Sarugani is a river flowing in the Sivagangai district of the Indian state of Tamil Nadu.

== See also ==
- List of rivers of Tamil Nadu
