= Kodaganar Dam =

Kodaganar Dam (a.k.a.Alagapuri Dam)
- Interactive map of Kodaganar Dam (a.k.a.Alagapuri Dam)
- Location: Alagapuri, Dindigul District, Tamil Nadu, India
- Coordinates: 10°35′40″N 77°58′20″E
- Opening date: 1977 and 1995

Dam and spillways
- Height: 12.75 metres (41.8 ft)

Kodaganar dam, also known as Alagapuri dam an irrigation dam built on Kodaganar River, located in Alagapuri village, near Vedasandur, Dindigul District in Tamil Nadu state of India. First built in 1977 the dam collapsed in 1977 flooding downstream due to multiple factors. The Dam was later fully reconstructed and reopened in 1994.

It irrigates some of the driest parts of Dindigul district and Karur district through minor canals alongside Kodaganar River till it joins River Cauvery near Karur.

== Construction ==
Kodaganar Dam was constructed in 1977 as an earthen gravity and masonry dam with regulators, with five vertical lift shutters each 3.05 m wide. The original dam was 15.75 m high from the foundation basement with height of 11.45 m above the river bed. The storage capacity at full reservoir level was 12.3 million cubic meters, while the flood capacity was 1275 cubic meter per second. A 2.5 m free board above the maximum water level was provided.

== Dam failure ==
Following heavy rains in the Kodaikanal range during 1978 in Western Ghats, flooding happened due to overtopping by flood waters. The waters which flowed over the downstream slopes of the embankment and breached the dam along various reaches. In addition, there was an Earthquake registered during the period of failure although the foundation was strong. Tough shutters were promptly operated during flood, the staff could only partially lift the shutters, due to power failure the additional stand-by generator commissioned did not help either. The staff then opted for the manual operation of shutters. In spite of all efforts, water eventually overtopped the embankment. Water gushed over the rear slopes, as a cascade of water was eroding the slopes. Breaches of length 20 m to 200 m were observed. It appeared as if the entire dam was overtopped and breached. Flooding happened downstream and the dam then part of Madurai district and Tiruchirappalli district with many lives lost downstream mostly in present-day Aravakuruchi taluk.

== Reconstruction ==
The dam was later fully reconstructed and reopened in mid-1990s with a height of 12.75 meters.
