= Markandeya River (Eastern Ghats) =

Coordinates: 30°07′N 76°46′E

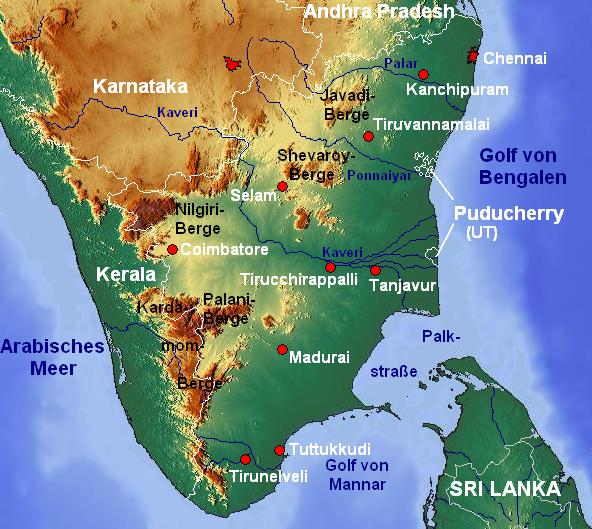
- Map showing the river

Physical characteristics
- Mouth
  - location: Ponnaiyar River
- Length: 18.4 mi (29.6 km) (In Tamil Nadu)

The Markandeya or Markanda is a river in the Indian states of Karnataka and Tamil Nadu. It flows into the South Pennar River near Krishnagiri Dam in Krishnagiri district of Tamil Nadu.

== Dam ==
Karnataka has built a dam across Markandeya river near Yargol village in Kolar district to provide drinking water to Kolar, Malur and Bangarpet taluks and 40 other villages. Karnataka has also obtained the required permission to build the dam across Markandeya river to store 500 million cubic metres of water at a cost of Rs 240 crores. However, objecting to the project, Tamil Nadu moved the Supreme Court against the proposed dam across River Markandeya, claiming that since Markandeya river is a tributary of Ponnaiyar River, any construction of the dam by Karnataka would obstruct the natural water flow downstream. Also since a large number of people in Tamil Nadu depend upon Ponnaiyar River water for irrigation as well as drinking purpose, the livelihood of farmers in Krishnagiri, Dharmapuri, Tiruvannamalai, Villupuram and Cuddalore districts would be affected by the construction of dam. Tamil Nadu further argued that constructing reservoirs in one of the tributaries of Ponnaiyar River was a violation of the Inter-State Water Disputes Act. Karnataka, on the other hand, questioned maintainability of the suit as well as the application by Tamil Nadu. It contended that about 75 to 80% of the project had been completed, it should be allowed to complete the remaining portion. Meanwhile, the government of Karnataka contended that it has not violated the terms of both agreements — 1892 and 1933 — and that as per the 1933 agreement, there is no requirement to get consent from Tamil Nadu if a dam is being constructed for the supply of drinking water. Also the consent of the Madras Government will not be required under the agreement of 1892 for the construction of any anicut (dam) if there is to be no irrigation under it. The counsel for Karnataka also stated that 75% of the river basin and the catchment area lies in Tamil Nadu and hence the dam across Markandeya river will not affect Tamil Nadu. Since the National Water Policy-2002 accords the highest priority to drinking water, Karnataka should be allowed to continue with the project.

== See also ==
- Ponnaiyar River
- List of rivers of Tamil Nadu
