= Engan Murugan Temple =

Engan Murugan temple
- Entry to the shrine of Muruga

Religion
- Affiliation: Hinduism
- Deity: Murugan

Location
- Location: Engan
- State: Tamil Nadu
- Country: India

Architecture
- Type: Dravidian

Engan Murugan Temple is a temple dedicated to the Tamil god Muruga situated as a separate shrine in the campus of Engan Brahmapurisvarar Temple in Engan in the Thiruvarur District of Tamil Nadu, India. It is a popular tourist destination. Engan is located 13 kilometres from Thiruvarur.

== The shrine of Muruga ==
The shrine of Muruga can be reached through the south entrance.

== Legend ==
According to popular folklore, the sculptor who sculpted the idol of Murugan or Shanmughantheswara in this temple was the same person who carved the sculpture at Sikkal and Ettukudi. Upon sculpting the idol at Sikkal, the sculptor cut his right thumb so as to ensure that he would not create anything anywhere which would surpass the beauty of the image at Sikkal. After sculpting the idol at Ethukudi, he, however, found the idol excelling the one at Sikkal in beauty and hence blinded himself as punishment. Hence while sculpting the idol of Murugan at Engan, the sculptor had to rely on the assistance of a woman as he was blind himself. By mistake, while sculpting, he cut a finger belonging to the woman and blood began to ooze. These droplets of blood fell on his eyes curing him of his blindness. Once the sculptor realised that he could now see, he exclaimed in amazement "Engan! Engan!" meaning "My eyes" in the Tamil language.

== Photogallery ==
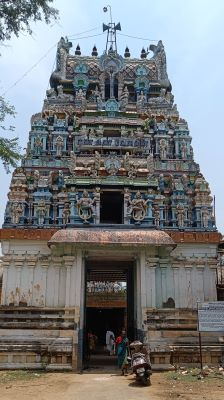
Rajagopura of Brahmapurisvarar temple

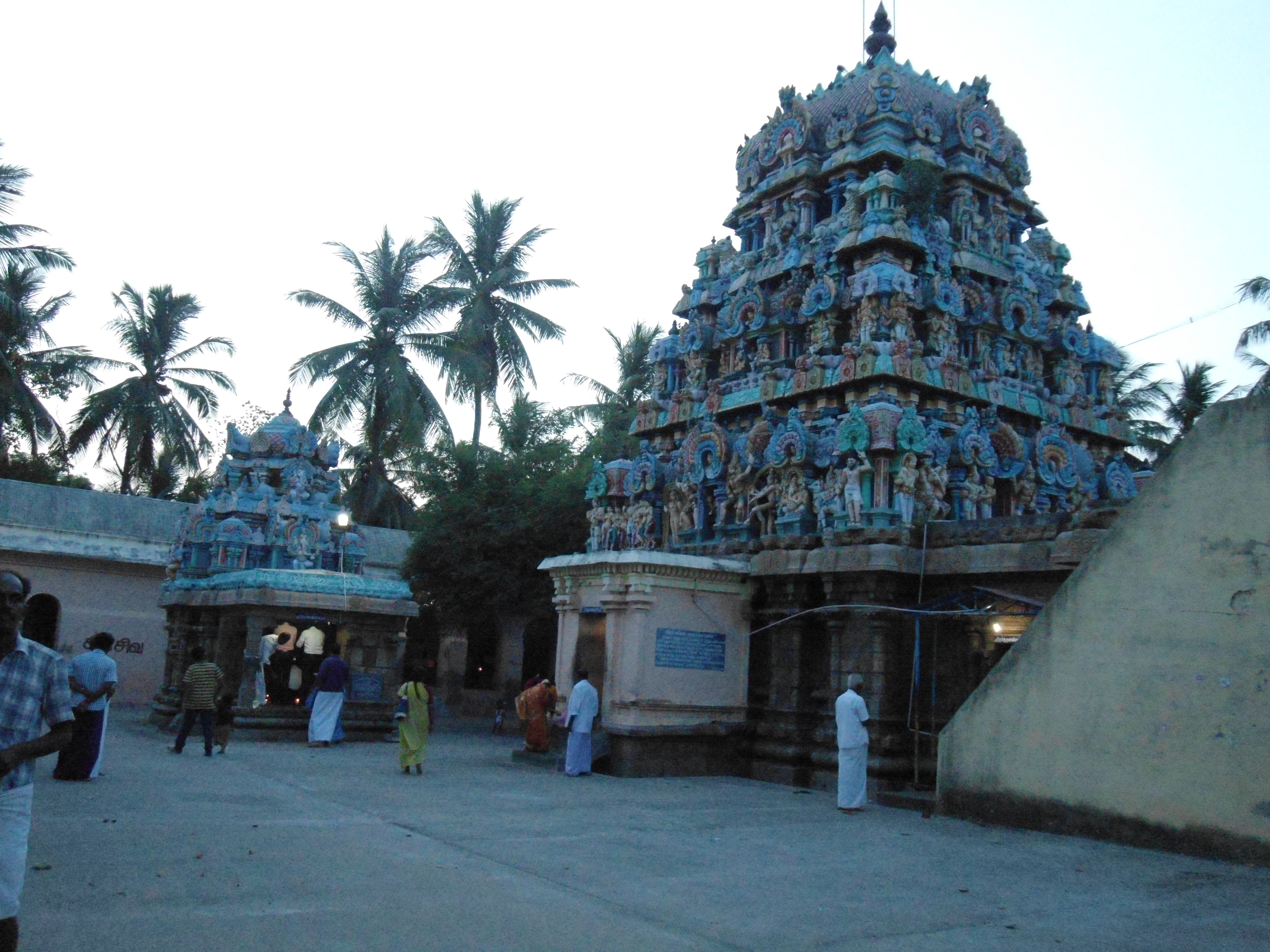
The Complex of Brahmapurisvarar temple

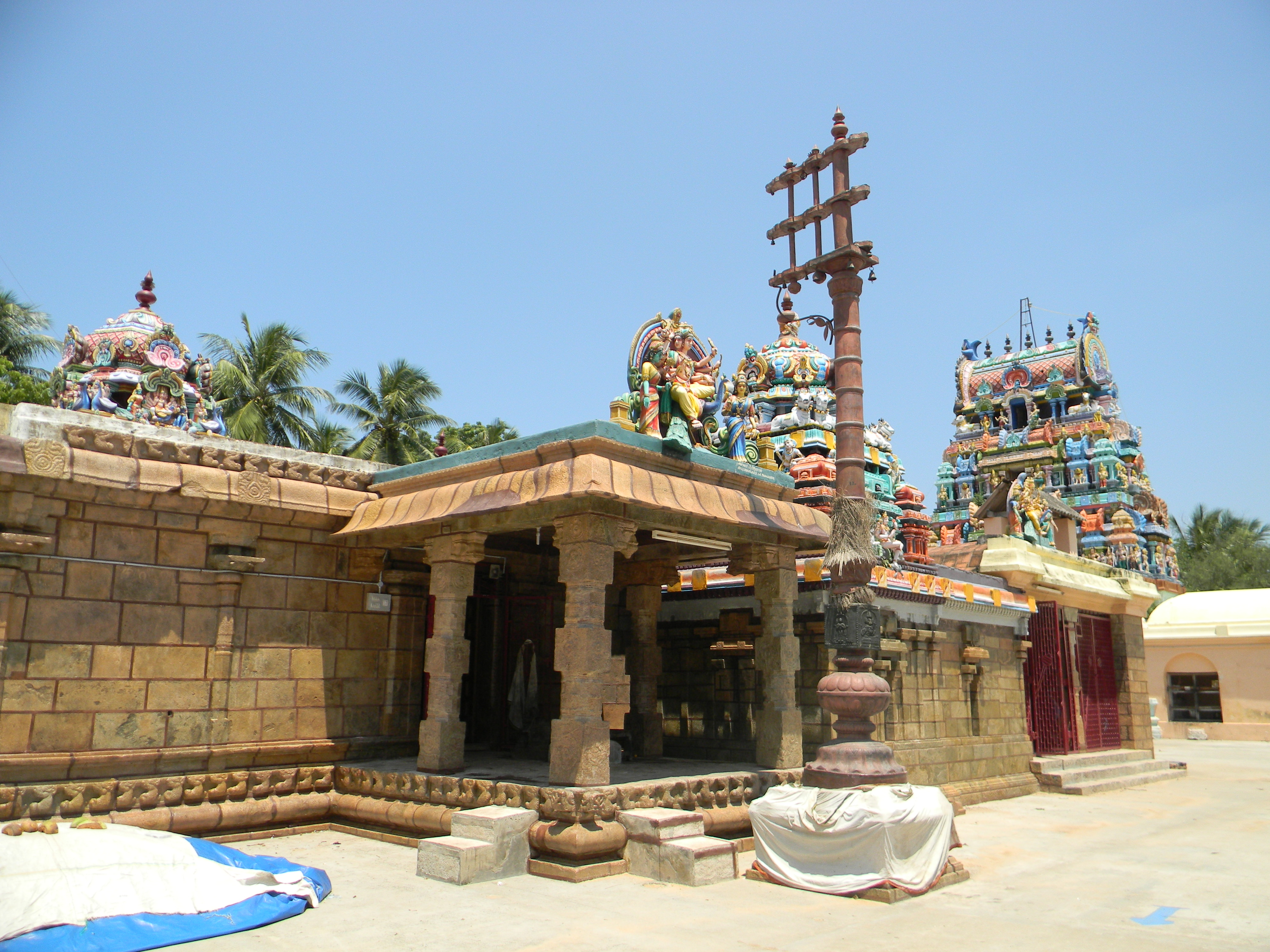
Another view of Brahmapurisvarar temple
