= Thennar River =

River in Tamil Nadu, India

Thennar is a river flowing in the city of Karaikudi of Sivagangai district of the Indian state of Tamil Nadu.

It runs for nearly 30 km starting from Nattar Canal in Karaikudi Municipal Corporation and runs through other parts of Sivaganga district and merges with Pampaar river in Ramanathapuram district.

== See also ==
- List of rivers of Tamil Nadu
