= Mullaiyar River =

River in Tamil Nadu, India

Mullaiyar is a river flowing in the Tiruvarur district of the Indian state of Tamil Nadu. It is a tributary of the Kaveri river, and flows into the Bay of Bengal.

== Course ==
The river is a tributary river of Kaveri and cuts into the Koraiyar River, then flows through Tiruvarur district and joins the sea Bay of Bengal near the city of Karaikal.

== See also ==
- List of rivers of Tamil Nadu
