= Nanganjiyar River =

Nanganjiyar is a river flowing in the Karur district of the Indian state of Tamil Nadu. It is a tributary of the Amaravati River.

== See also ==
List of rivers of Tamil Nadu
