= Pandavaiar River =

River in Tamil Nadu, India

Pandavaiar is a river flowing in the Tiruvarur district of the Indian state of Tamil Nadu.

== See also ==
- List of rivers of Tamil Nadu
