= Kodavanar River =

River in India

The Kodavanar River, is a river in the Palni Hills in Tamil Nadu. It is a tributary of the Amaravati River.
