= Kundar River (India) =

Coordinates: 13°49′N 77°28′E

Kundar is a river flowing in the Madurai district of the Indian state of Tamil Nadu.

== See also ==
List of rivers of Tamil Nadu
