= Avazhikkarai (village) =

- village
- Location in Tamil Nadu, India Avazhikkarai (India)
- Coordinates: 11.000755°N 79.727622°E
- Country: India
- State: Tamil Nadu
- District: Mayiladuthurai
- Elevation: 8 m (26 ft)

Languages
  - Official: Tamil
- Time zone: UTC+5:30 (IST)
- PIN: 609306
- Telephone code: 0091-4364
- Vehicle registration: TN51- TN82-
- Nearest city: Mayiladuthurai, Karaikkal
- Literacy: 100%
- Lok Sabha constituency: Mayiladuthurai
- Vidhan Sabha constituency: Poompuhar

Avazhikkarai is a village in the Tharangambadi Taluk and Mayiladuthurai district of Tamil Nadu, India.

== Etymology ==
Avazhikkarai=Aa(Cow)+vazhi(way)+karai(path) =>way for the cows and woodcutters to reach the Nedum kadu(long forest) named Nedungadu. Nandalar River flown through this village so karai means hear as sidewall of Nandalar.

== Literacy ==
100% of people known to read and write Tamil Language

== Gallery ==
The village people draw these types of traditional patterns at Festival time

Vinayagar Temple

== Nearest Notable Places ==
- Mayiladuthurai (23 km)
- Tharangambadi (16 km)
- Poompuhar (30 km)
- Karaikkal (16 km)
- Thirunallar (8 km)
