= Kamarajar Lake =

- Location within Tamil Nadu
- Location: Dindigul District, Tamil Nadu, India
- Coordinates: 10.295°N 77.811°E
- Surface area: 400 acres (160 ha)

Kamarajar Lake is a 400-acre (1.6 km^{2}) monsoon-fed water body 6 km (3.7 mi) from Athoor village in Dindigul District, Tamil Nadu, which is formed by the Kamarajar Sagar Dam. This lake is a beautiful location with the hills of the Western Ghats overlooking it. Fishermen in their coracles, coconut and banana plantations and cardamom estates are the common sights. Swimming is allowed.

Some eco-friendly resorts are along the northern border of the lake provide for tourists. Coconut trees and mango trees are plenty in the area, making a tropical atmosphere prevalent here.

Taking walks through the countryside in the area is one of the most popular activities in this area. Several walking trails are present around Kamarajar Lake. Most places worth seeing near Kamarajar can be walked to in a reasonable amount of time using these walking trails.

Many birds can be sighted along the trails. Birds such as peacocks, storks, kingfishers, cranes, herons and sunbirds are all known to frequent the area. In fact, one bird watching group from Great Britain was even able to document seeing 160 different species of birds in a short span of four days. Trekking is another popular tourist activity in the area.

Although tigers are not seen in this area, other types of wildlife do flourish in this region. It is common to see leopards, mongooses, monkeys, barking deer, Indian bison and wild boar throughout the area.
