= Agaram Aru River =

River in Tamil Nadu, India

Coordinates: 12.873894°N 78.907049°E

Uttara kaveri (Agaram Aru) is a river flowing in the Vellore district of the Indian state of Tamil Nadu.

== See also ==
List of rivers of Tamil Nadu
