= Kottagudi River =

Coordinates: 9°59′N 78°57′E

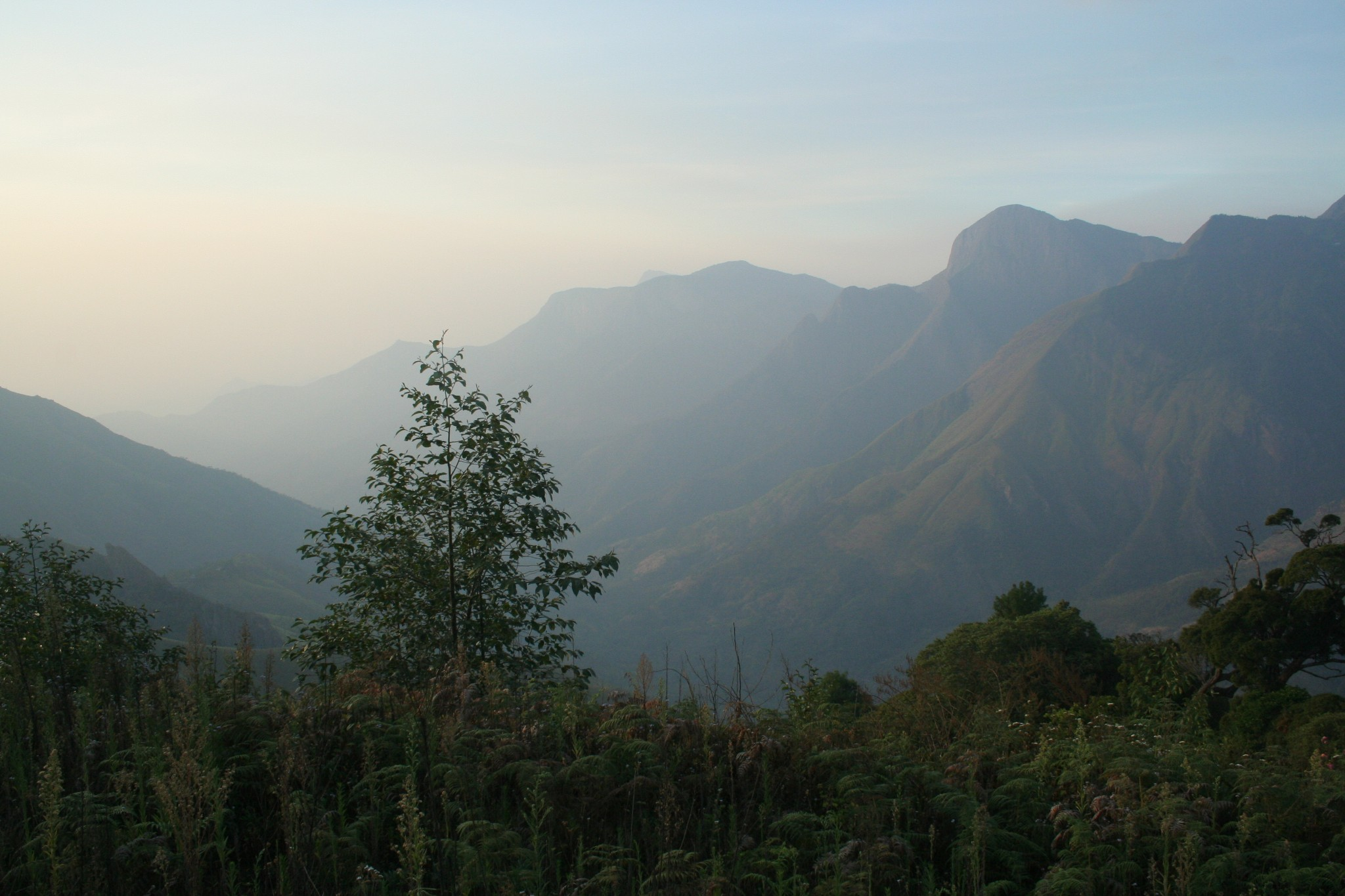
Valley at the source. Looking SSE.

Kottagudi is a river flowing in the Theni district of the Indian state of Tamil Nadu. Kottagudi river flows from Meesapulimala in the foothills of Athiyuthu, Anakarai in western ghats. It is a tributary river and stretches for a distance up to 40 km and later merges with Veerapandi river(an extension of Mullaiperiyar river.) It acts as the main water source and used for drinking in nearby villages and towns like Bodinayakanur, Durairajapuram etc. Flash floods in this river has been reported during rainy season.

The first water supply scheme was executed in 1944 and another in 1988 across this river. Currently, the total quantity of water supplied from the river is about 7.13 MLD, which translates to 90 litres per capita per day (LPCD). Government have proposed to build a new check dam in order to facilitate the water supply.

There is a check dam already available in Naripatti village.

== See also ==
List of rivers of Tamil Nadu
