= Naganathi River =

Naganathi (also Naganadhi) is a river flowing in the Vellore and Tiruvannamalai districts of the Indian state of Tamil Nadu.

The river originates near the Jawadhu Hills and flows for approximately 30 kilometres through Vellore district before joining the Kamandala River in Tiruvannamalai district.

Naganadhi is primarily a rain-fed seasonal river, historically dependent on monsoon rainfall. Over time, reduced rainfall, groundwater depletion and land-use changes led to the river drying up in several several stretches by the early 21st century.

== Rejuvenation efforts ==
Since 2014, rejuvenation efforts by local communities have been ongoing, supported by the Art of Living Foundation and the District Rural Development Agency (DRDA) under the Mahatma Gandhi National Rural Employment Guarantee Act (MGNREGA) scheme. Initiatives involved the construction of recharge wells, boulder check dams, and watershed structures to improve groundwater recharge and surface flow.

Reports show measurable improvements in groundwater levels, return of surface flow in some parts of the river, and green cover along the banks.

== See also ==
List of rivers of Tamil Nadu
