= Kondanna =

Kondanna may refer to

- Kondanna Buddha, one of the 29 Buddhas of Theravāda Buddhism
- Kaundinya (Pāli: Añña Koṇḍañña), one of the first five Buddhist monks

== See also ==
- Kaundinya (disambiguation)
