= Chinnar River =

River in South India

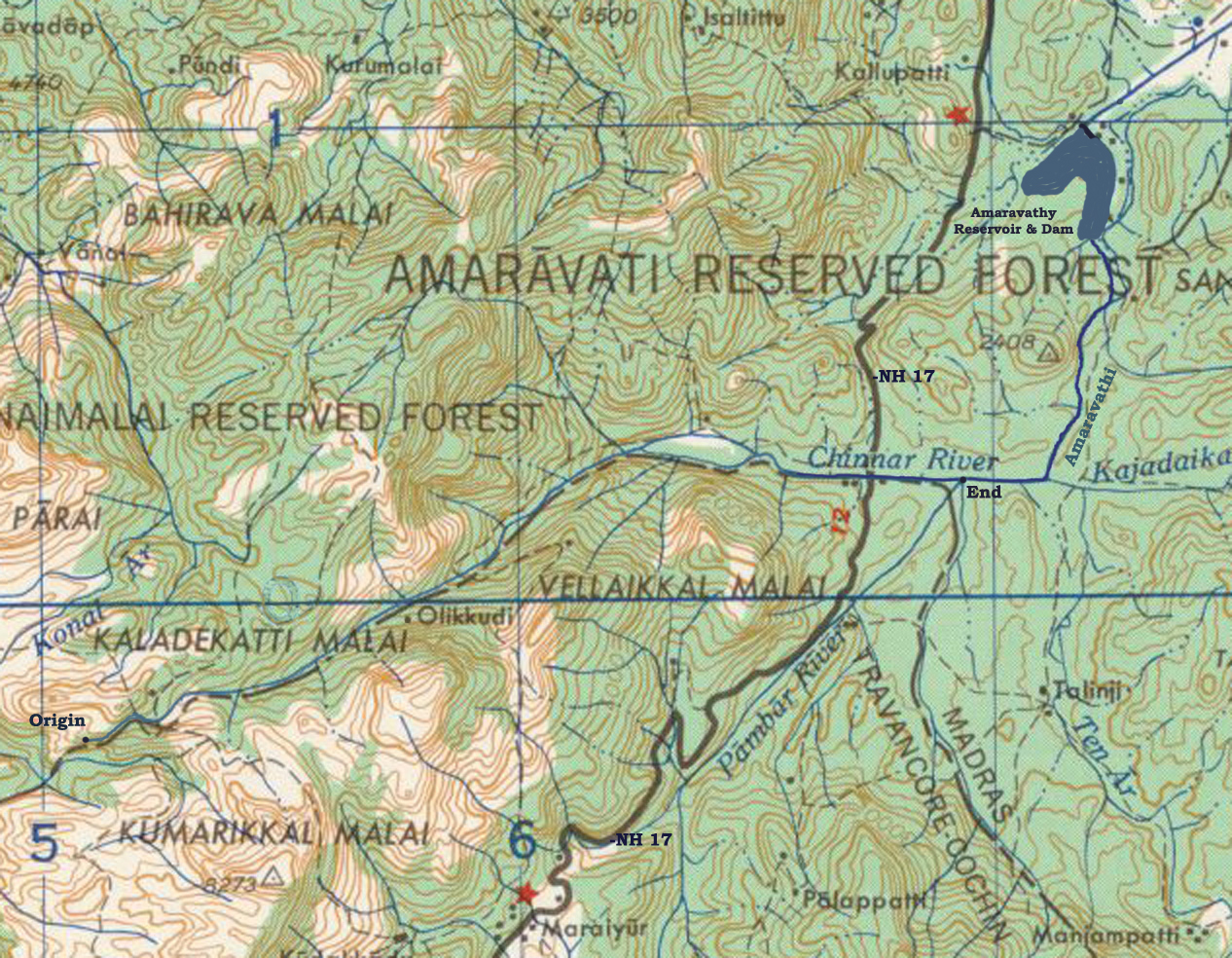
- Chinnar river and Pambar river merge to become Amaravati river

Location
- Country: Idukki District, Kerala, India

Physical characteristics
- Source
  - location: Anamalai Hills
  - coordinates: 10°19′N 77°06′E
  - elevation: 1,829 meters (6,001 ft)
- Mouth
  - location: Amaravati River
  - coordinates: 10°21′2″N 77°14′14″E
  - elevation: 473 meters (1,552 ft)
- Length: 18 km (11 mi)

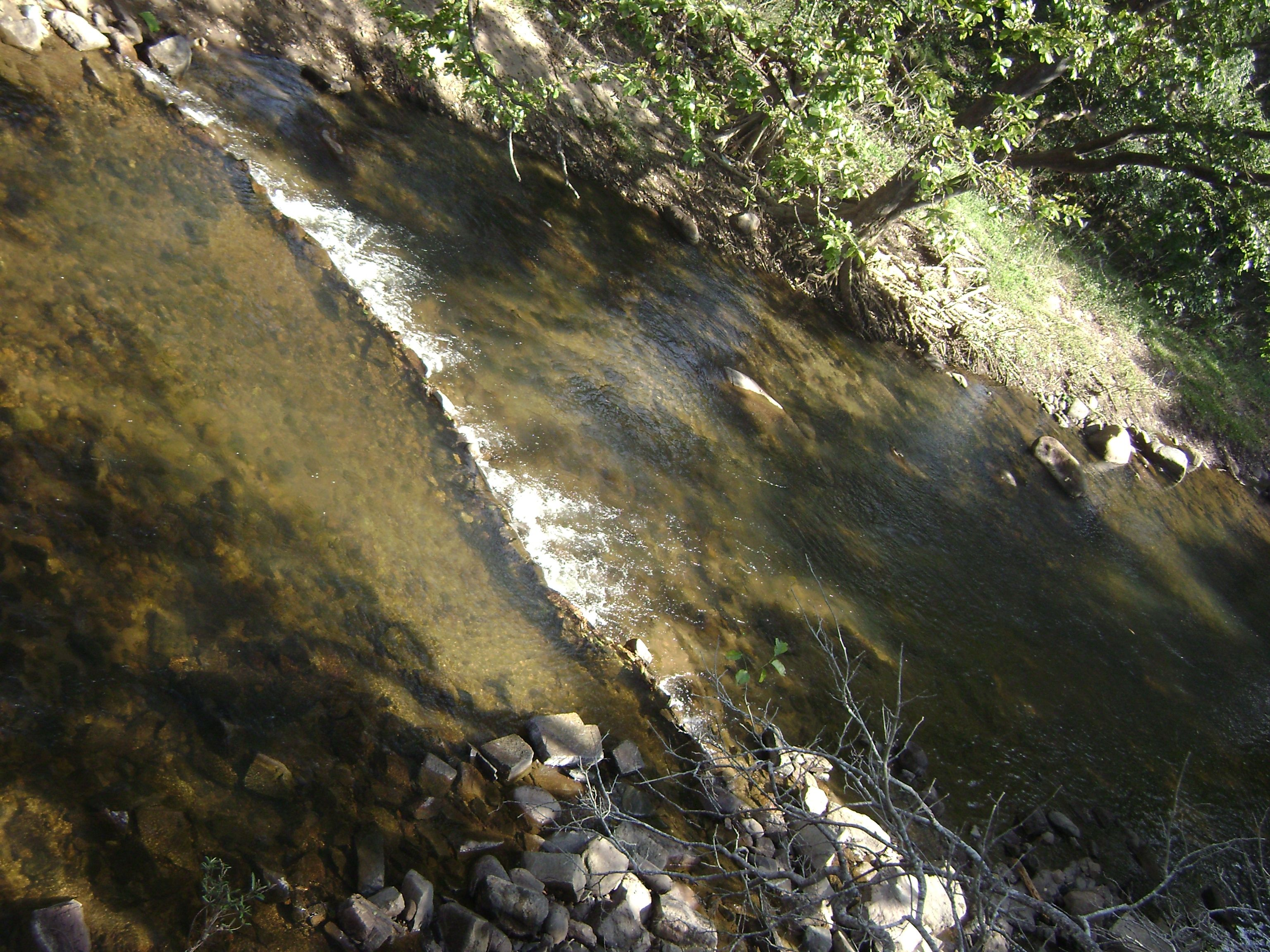
Chinnar river from SH 17 border bridge between Tamil Nadu and kerala

The Chinnar River originates in the Annaimalai Hills below a grassy pass between the hills Kumarikkal Mala (8,275 ft) and Kaladekatti Malai In Idukki District, Kerala state South India. The 18 km long Chinnar river defines the East-West Tamil Nadu/Kerala state boundary along the northern edge of the Chinnar Wildlife Sanctuary and the southern edge of the Indira Gandhi Wildlife Sanctuary. Several adult crocodiles were reported in the Chinnar river in 1992.

== Route ==
The river first proceeds through a large shola then past the Muthuvar settlement of Olikkudi at 10.331°N 77.1435°E. There is another small village #2 at 10.3553°N 77.1839°E. There are Kerala and Tamil Nadu border checkpoints on either side of the river where a SH 17 road bridge crosses the river at 10.35241°N 77.21775°E. 2 km east it is joined from the south by the Pambar River at Koottar where a comfortable tree house accommodation is available. Here it crosses into Indira Gandhi Wildlife Sanctuary in Tamil Nadu and becomes the Amaravati River.

== Tributaries ==
The river is joined by a small stream from the south at a small village, 2. 2 km east of the NH 17 road bridge, while the river is joined from the south by the Pambar River at Koottar. The western part of the Manjampatti Valley catchment basin drains into the end of the Chinnar River. This Valley is drained by the stream Ten Ar and a smaller unnamed stream 2 km to its west. The unnamed stream is the N-S political boundary between Tamil Nadu and Kerala. The top of the ridge above this stream to the west is the western limit of the catchment. This unnamed stream joins the Pambar River at the point they both join the Chinnar River at the north west corner of the Valley.
