= Karipottan River =

Karipottan is a river flowing in the Namakkal district of the Indian state of Tamil Nadu.

== See also ==
List of rivers of Tamil Nadu
