= Mundhal Odai River =

Mundhal Odai is a river flowing in the Tirunelveli district of the Indian state of Tamil Nadu.

== See also ==
List of rivers of Tamil Nadu
