= Vedamaliyaru River =

River in Tamil Nadu, India

Vedamaliyaru is a river flowing in the Tirunelveli district of the Indian state of Tamil Nadu.

== See also ==
List of rivers of Tamil Nadu
