= Kamandala River =

River in Tamil Nadu, India

Coordinates: 12°37′39″N 79°22′44″E

Kamandala is a river flowing in the Tiruvannamalai district of the Indian state of Tamil Nadu. Padavedu is centrally located among Vellore, Thiruvannamalai and Arani in the Vellore – Polur (Thiruvannamalai) route. While going from Vellore, there is a junction called Santhavasal at 32 km from Vellore town and from this junction you have to turn right (towards west) and travel further for about 6 km to reach Padavedu.

Padavedu is the avatara sthalam of Parasuramar, one of the Dhasavadharams of Mahavishnu There are more than 10 ancient temples of the 12th century. Sri Renugambal Temple is one of the important Sakthi Sthalams. Ramar is seen in a meditative posture with 'Chin mudhra' in Sri Yoga Ramachandra moorthy temple. Sri Varadharaja Perumal temple and Sri Ammayappar temple were once buried under the sand and have been excavated and renovated. In Subramanya Swamy temple, Lord Subramania is seen standing on his peacock. Legend has it that Lord Subramania was conferred the title "Deva Senapathi" only on this hill top at the behest of Goddess Renugambal. Sri Lakshmi Narsimhar temple is having Goddess Laskhmi seated on the right lap of Lord Narasimhar (usually She will be on the left lap). Sri Kailasa Vinayagar temple where the Vinayagar is about 5.5 feet high. Sri Kailasanadhar Temple is where Lord Shiva is seen with Uma devi in human form but in a vandalized condition. Sri Venugopla Swamy Temple that is on a hill near a forest with a few hanging bridges. Vel Temple is where 'Vel' consecrated by Siddhar Bhogar is present. Sri Veera Anjaneyar temple is where there is a beautiful 8-foot tall Anjaneyar.

== See also ==
- List of rivers of Tamil Nadu
