= Kottamalaiyaru River =

River in India

Kottamalaiyaru is a river flowing in the Tirunelveli district of the Indian state of Tamil Nadu.

== See also ==
- List of rivers of Tamil Nadu
