= Kodaganar River =

Waterway in Tamil Nadu, India

The Kodaganar River is a waterway in Tamil Nadu, India. It is a tributary of the Amaravati River.
