= Kaundinya River =

River flowing through south India

The Kaundinya River is a non-perennial river and tributary of the Palar River flowing in the Chittoor district of Andhra Pradesh and Vellore district of Tamil Nadu.

== See also ==
List of rivers of Tamil Nadu
