= Komugi River =

River in India

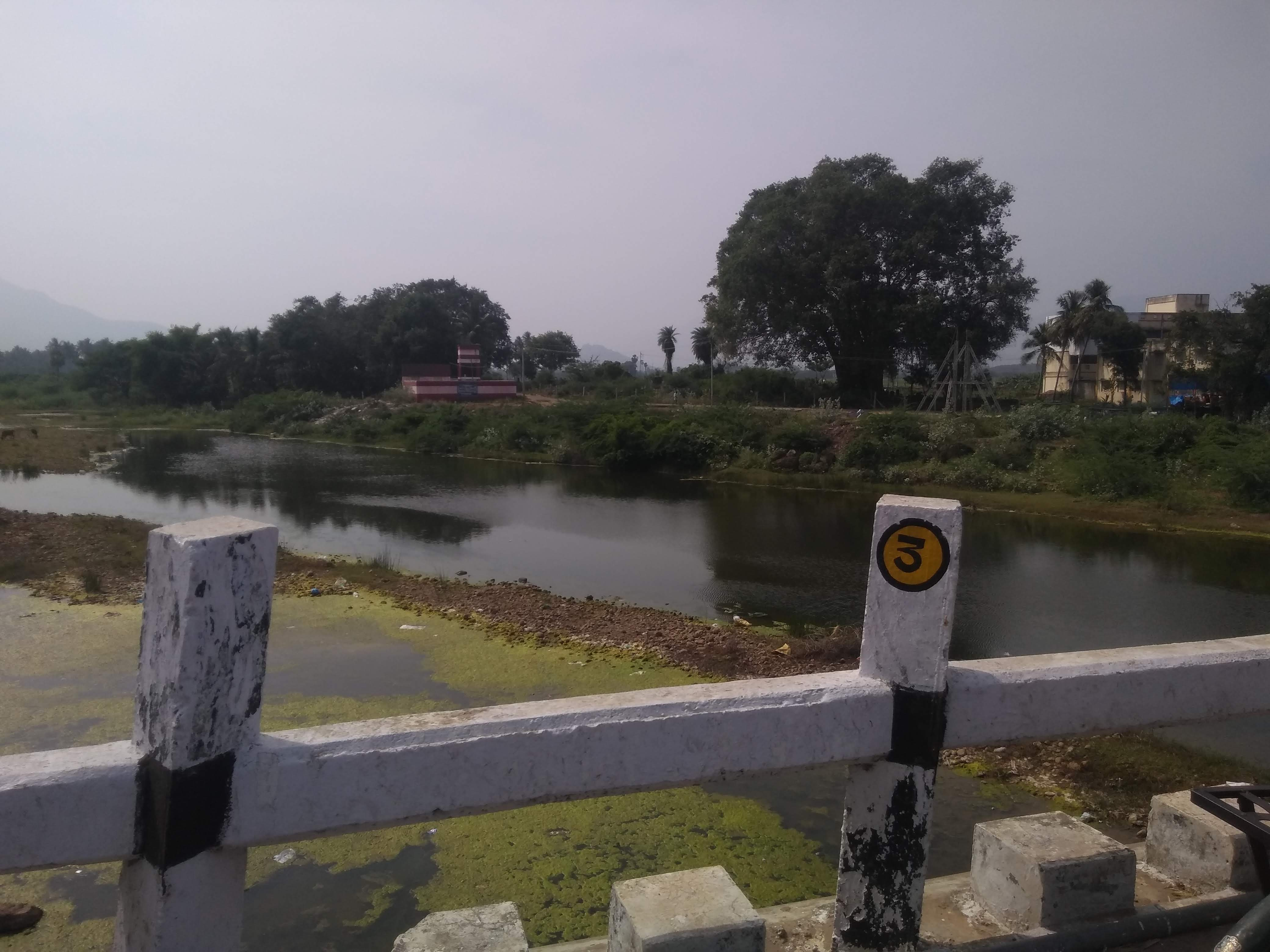
Komugi River

Komugi is a river flowing in the Kallakurichi district of the Indian state of Tamil Nadu.

== See also ==
List of rivers of Tamil Nadu
