= Engan, India =

Engan
- village
- Country: India
- State: Tamil Nadu
- District: Tiruvarur

Population (2001)
  - Total: 2,724

Languages
  - Official: Tamil
- Time zone: UTC+5:30 (IST)

Engan is a village in the Thiruvarur taluk of Thiruvarur district in Tamil Nadu, India. The Engan Murugan Temple, a popular Hindu shrine is located here.

== Demographics ==
As per the 2001 census, Engan had a population of 2,724 with 1,359 males and 1,365 females. The sex ratio was 1004. The literacy rate was 67.34.
