= Amaravati River =

Amaravathi River Aanporunai
- River Amaravathi and its tributaries
- Etymology: from Purananuru 36

Location
- Country: India
- Location: Udumalaipettai- Dharapuram-Aravakurichi-Karur, Tamil Nadu

Physical characteristics
- Source
  - location: Anamalai Hills, Chinnar River, Pambar River at
  - coordinates: 10°21′2″N 77°14′14″E
  - elevation: 473 meters (1,552 ft)
- Mouth
  - location: Karur at
  - coordinates: 10°57′36″N 78°4′53″E
  - elevation: 360 feet (110 m)
- Length: 282 km (175 mi)
- Basin size: 8,380 km^{2} (3,240 sq mi)

Basin features
- River system: Kaveri
- Tributaries
  - right: Nanganji, Kodavanar

The Amaravati River is the longest tributary of the Kaveri River in the fertile districts of Udumalpet, Dharapuram and Karur Tamil Nadu state, South India.

== Course ==
The 282-kilometre (175 mi) long Amaravati River begins at the Kerala/Tamil Nadu border at the bottom of Manjampatti Valley between the Anaimalai Hills and the Palni Hills in Indira Gandhi Wildlife Sanctuary and National Park in Tirupur district. It descends in a northerly direction through Amaravathi Reservoir and Amaravathi Dam at Amaravathinagar. It is joined by the Kallapuram River at the mouth of the Ajanda valley in Udumalaipettai. Through Dharapuram and Aravakurichi it joins with the Kaveri at Thirumukkudalur, about 10 kilometres (6 mi) from Karur.

Nanganji, Kodavanar, Shanmuga nadhi, Uppar, Kudumiar, Thenar and many other tributaries join with the Amravati river. Other tributaries also include Pambar and Chinnar rivers from Kerala.

== Use ==
This river irrigates over 60,000 acres (240 km^{2}) of agricultural lands in Tiruppur and Karur districts. The Amaravathi Dam has 4 megawatts of electricity generating capacity installed. The Amaravathi River and its basin, especially in the vicinity of Karur, are heavily used for industrial processing water and waste disposal and as a result are severely polluted due to large amount of textile dyeing and bleaching units. But nowadays in karur, the changes are vicinity by seeing Amaravati river on its clean surface because of pollution controlled by government.

== History ==
The ancient names of the river is Aanporunai and Aambravathi. Amaravathi, invokes the greenery and Kalpavriksha tree of Lord Indra's heaven. The name Amaravathi echoes the Hindu past and present of southern India. By Hindu religion, river is from the grace of goddess Ambaal form the heaven. The Amaravathi river swells into life in the Anjanad valley (Anaimalai, Kerala state) of the Western Ghats, whose slopes are awash with Kurinji blossoms once every 12 years, descends to the plains near Udumalaipettai, Tamil Nadu, and flows to make the rich plains of Dharapuram and Karur . It is one of the longest rivers (282 km) in Tamil Nadu, which join with the river Cauvery, near Karur.

== Gallery ==
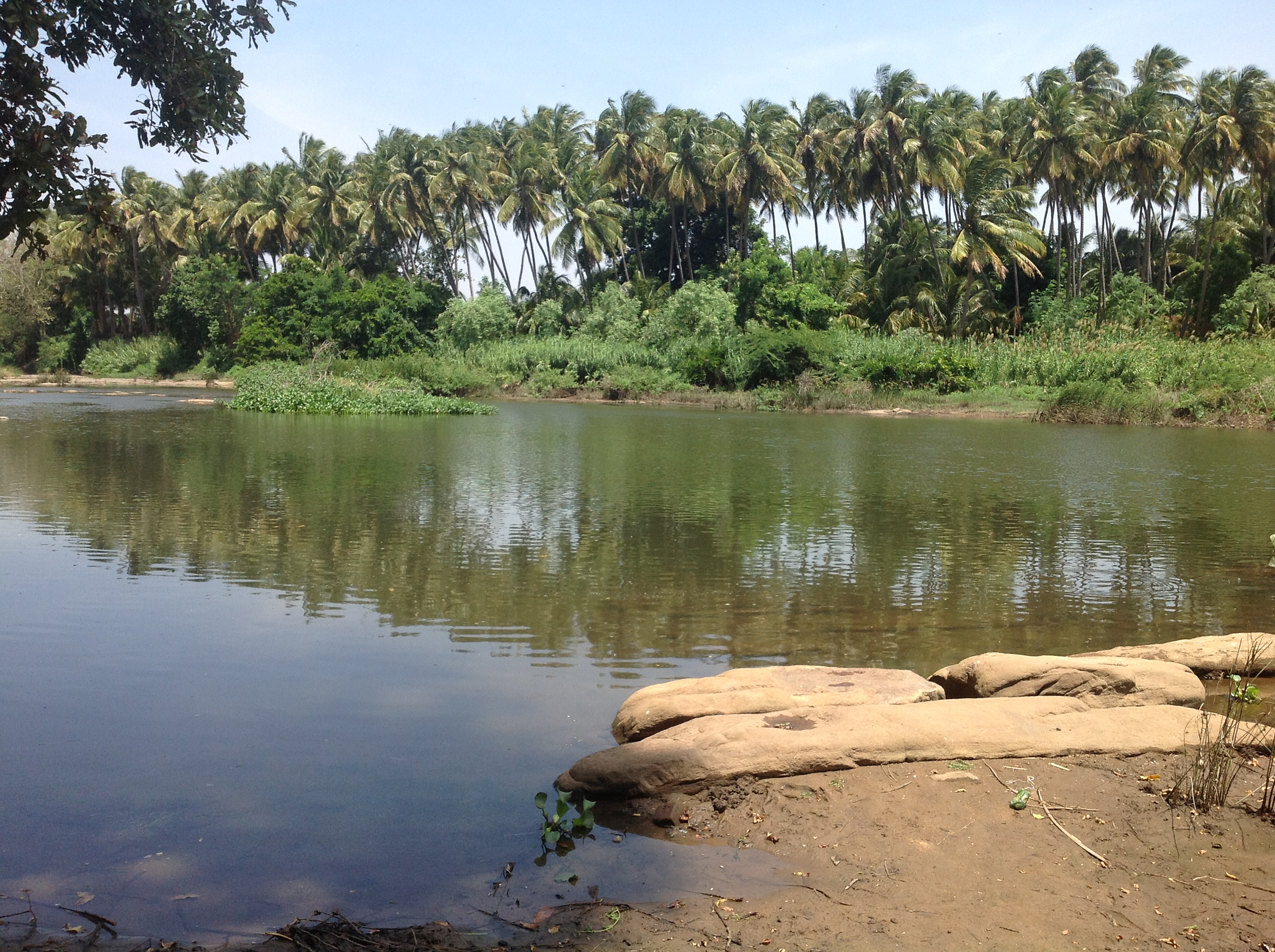
The view of Amaravathy River near the Arjuneswarar Temple in Kadathur

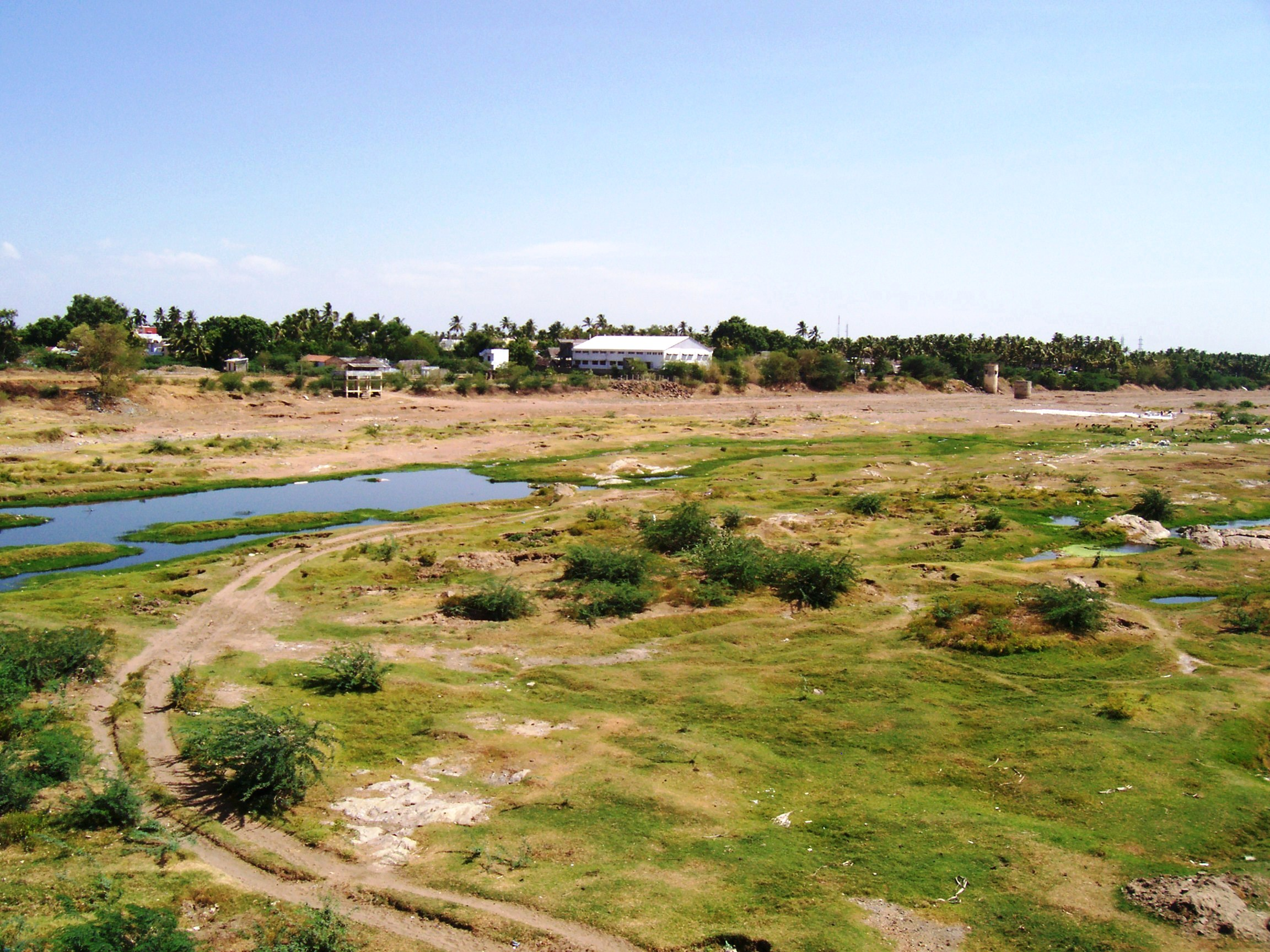
The wide Amaravathi River bed at Karur

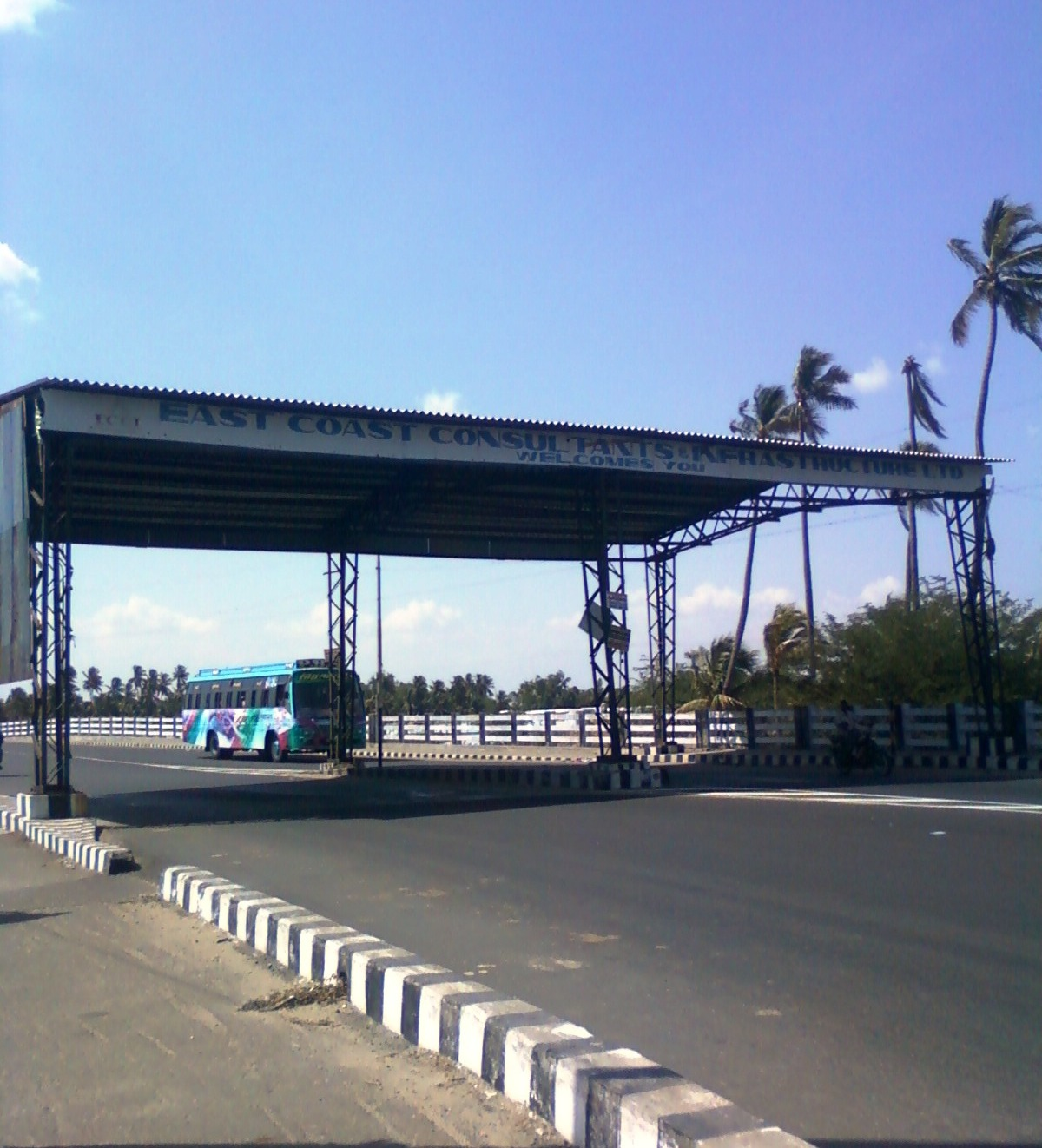
Toll plaza near Karur on NH7
