= Kovilvenni =

Town in Thiruvarur, India

Coordinates: 10°47′N 79°22′E

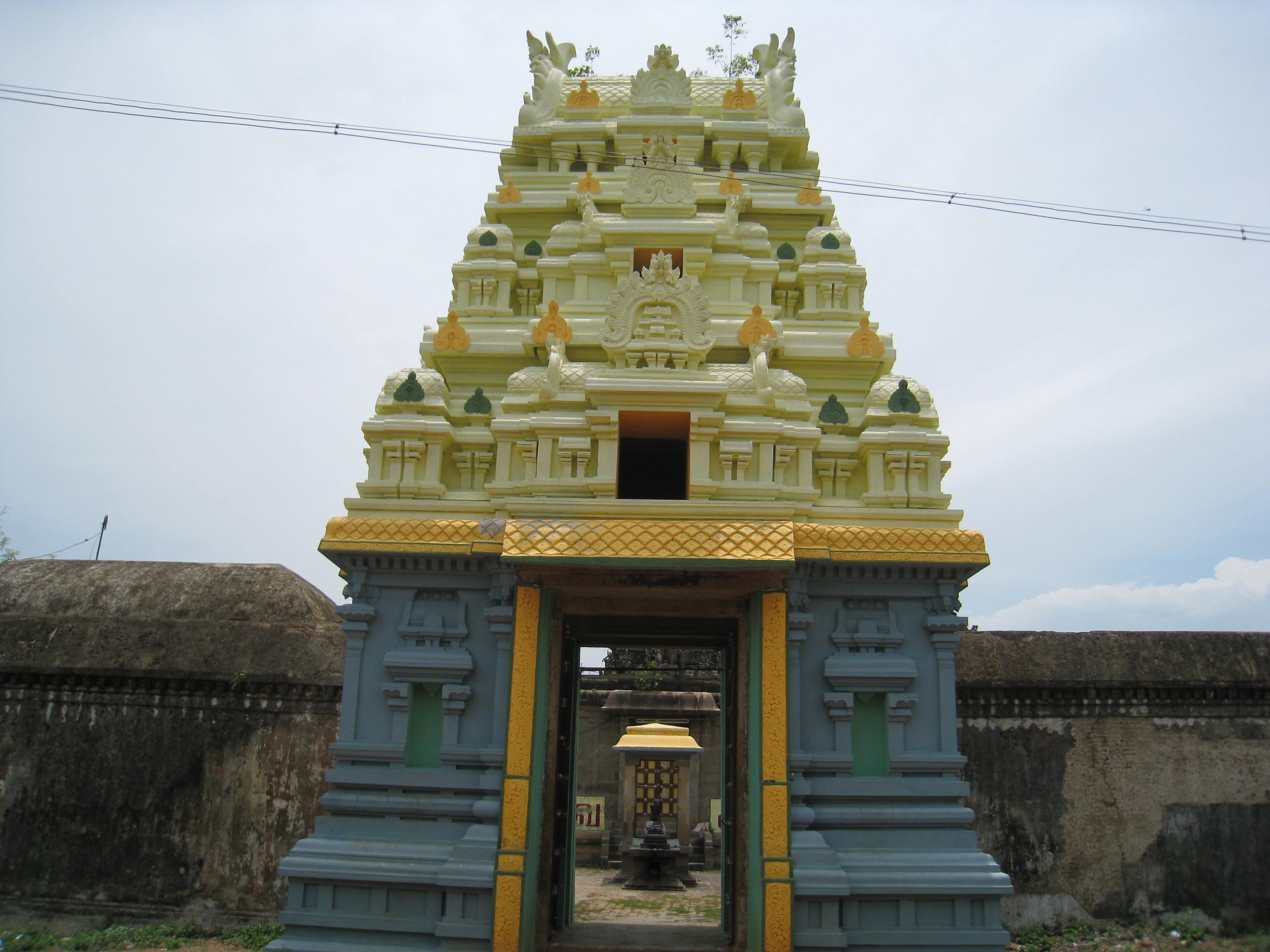
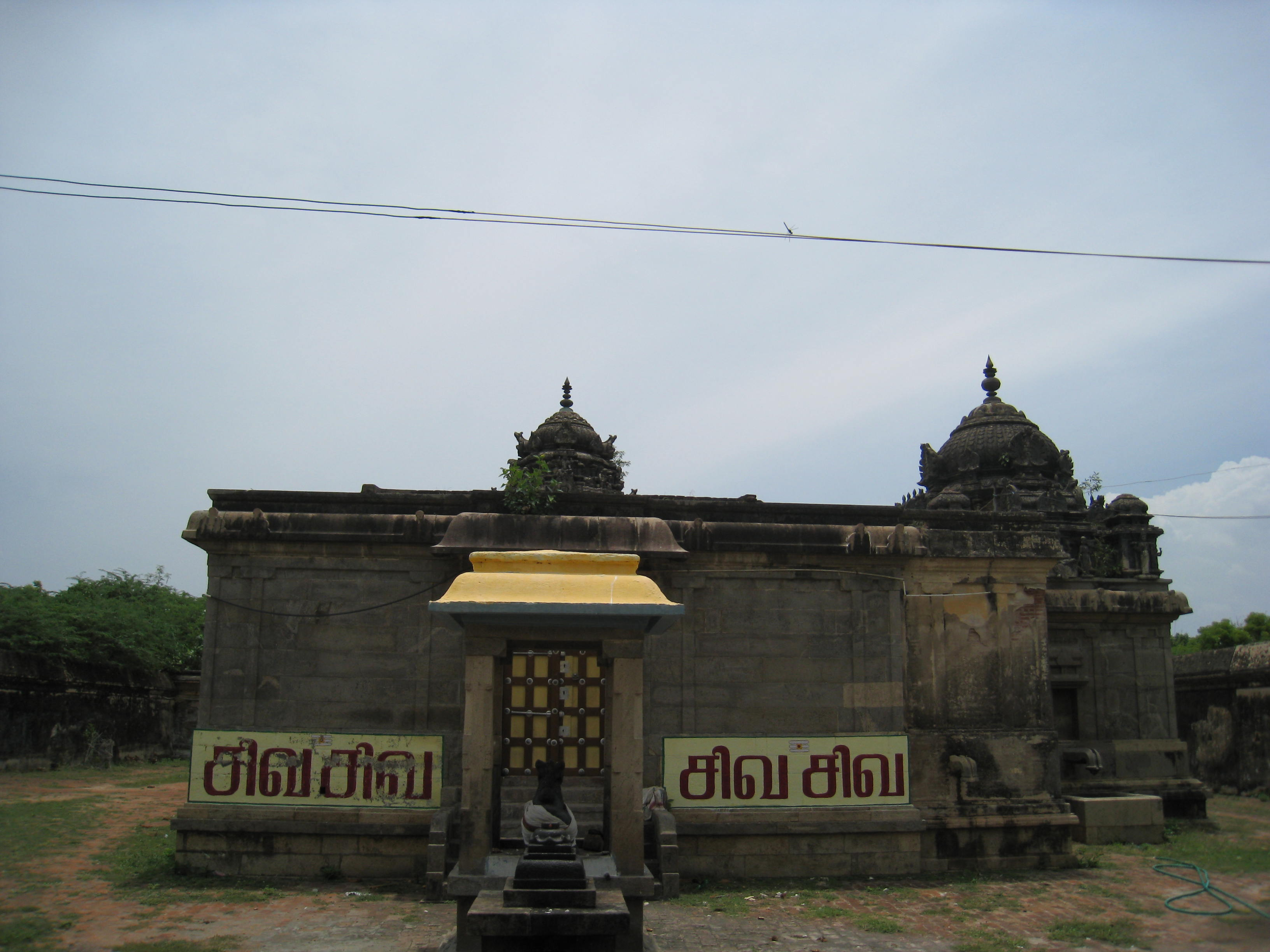
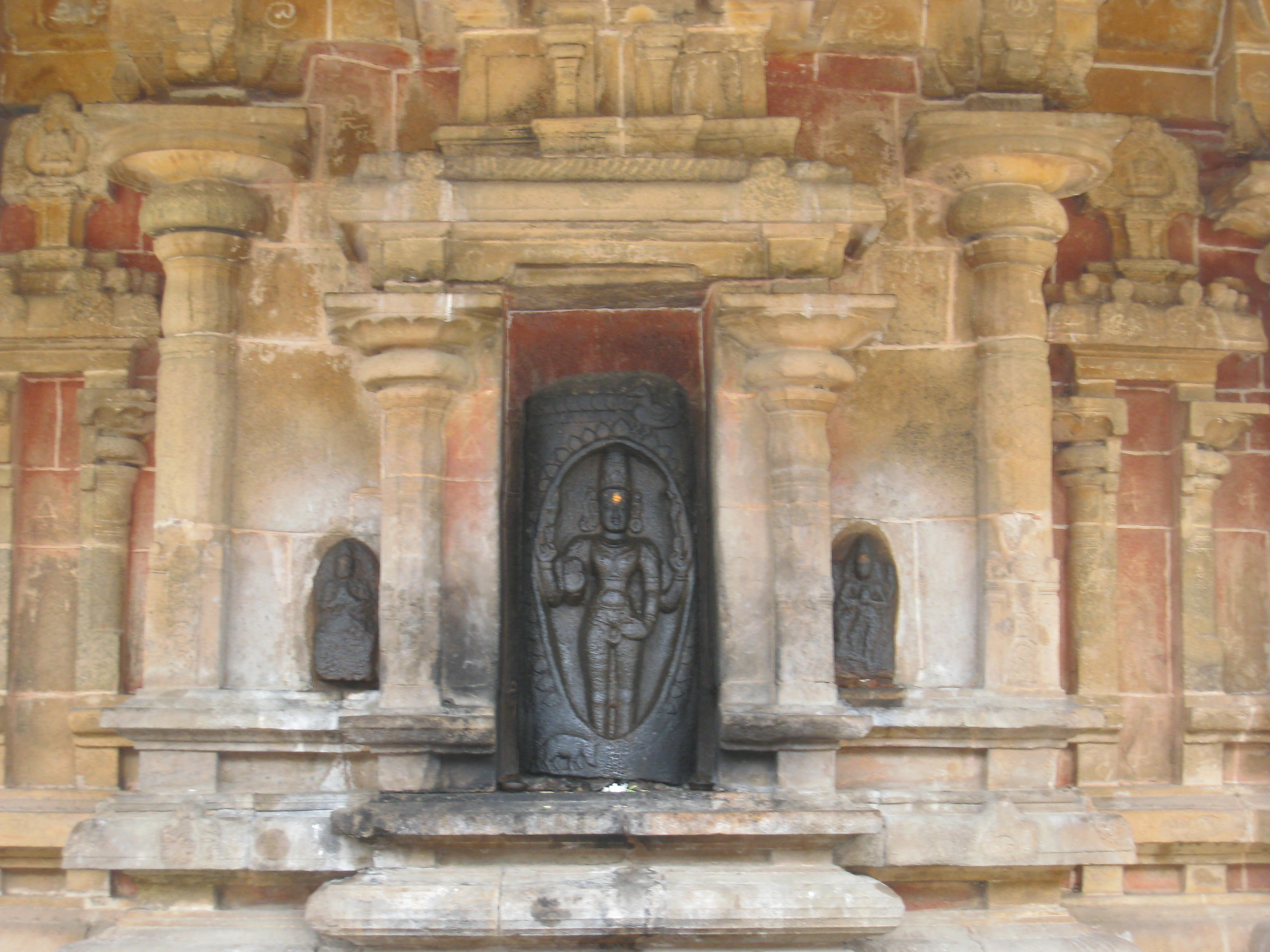
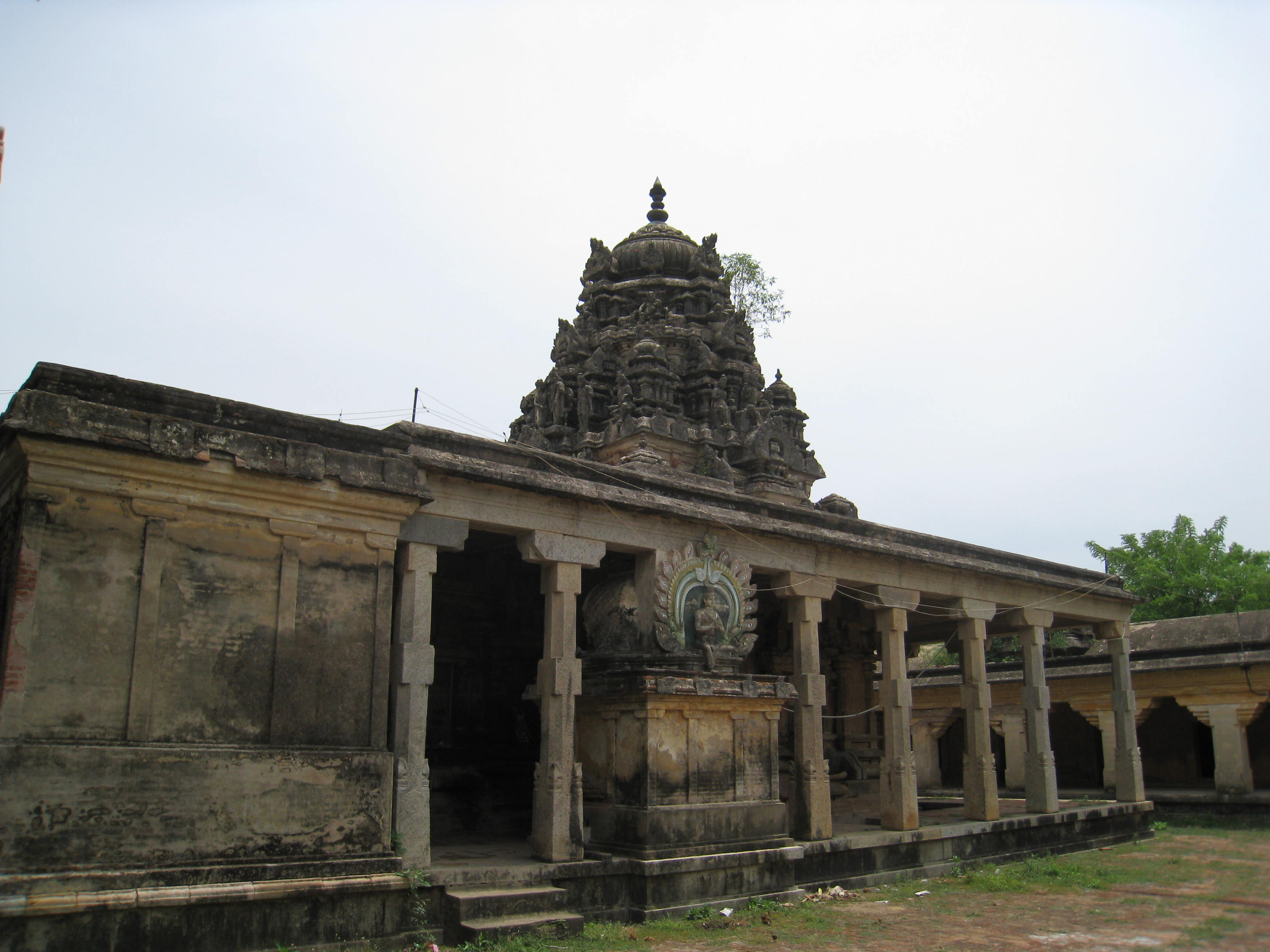
Karumbeswarar temple, Kovilvenni

Kovilvenni or Koilvenni is a town near Needamangalam in the district of Thiruvarur. It is 24 km away from Thanjavur.

== History ==
Kovilvenni was under the Chola Kingdom during the ancient period. The great Battle of Venni took place between the Cholas and the Cheras here.

=== Battle of Venni ===
Signboard, Kovilvenni

Battle of Venni was fought by the Early Chola dynasty's Karikala Chola with a confederacy of Pandya and Chera kings. The battle resulted in absolute victory for Karikala. Following his defeat, the Chera dynasty king Uthiyan Cheralathan starved himself to death. The battle is considered historical and dated approximately to 190 CE.

== Educational Institutions ==
The top ranked Engineering college in Thanjavur district and Thiruvarur district, the Anjalai Ammal Mahalingam Engineering College is in Kovilvenni. St. Marcinas Higher Secondary School is in Kovilvenni near Ammapettai.
