= Koraiyar River (Tiruvarur district) =

River in Tamil Nadu, India

The Koraiyar River is a non-perennial river in the Tiruvarur district of the Indian state of Tamil Nadu. It is in the southern part of the Kaveri delta that covers much of the region of Chola Nadu. The Koraiyar begins as a distributary of the Vennaaru River where that river is dammed northwest of Needamangalam in Needamangalam taluk. After branching off from the Vennaaru, it flows southeast to the southwest of Needamangalam. It continues southeast for some distance, then turns sharply to the east. It follows this eastern course for some distance then turns southward west of Podakkudi. It follows a southern course through Mannargudi taluk then turns to the southwest north of Thillaivilagam in Thiruthiraipoondi taluk. Flowing to the east of Muthupet, it turns southeast and subsequently empties into Muthupet Lagoon.
