= Needamangalam =

Needamangalam Neeradum Mangalam, Needa
- Town Panchayat
- Nidamangalam
- Location in Tamil Nadu, India
- Coordinates: 10.771°N 79.414°E
- Country: India
- State: Tamil Nadu
- District: Thiruvarur district
- Region: Chola Nadu

Government
  - Type: Town Panchayat
  - Body: Needamangalam Town Panchayat

Population (2011)
  - Total: 147,451

Languages
  - Official: Tamil
- Time zone: UTC+5:30 (IST)
- PIN: 614 404
- Telephone code: (91)4367
- Vehicle registration: TN-50

Needamangalam or Nidamangalam, is a town panchayat in Thiruvarur district in the Cauvery Delta of the Indian state of Tamil Nadu. Needamangalam was originally part of the composite Tanjore Dist during the British Raj period until 1997. In the 18th and 19th century, it was also called Yamunambalpuram. Needamangalam is the headquarters of the Needamangalam Taluk. The town is located 30 km east of Thanjavur, 80 km east of Tiruchirappalli and 318 km south of Chennai. Needamangalam is a junction for two busy highways, National Highway 67 and State Highway SH 66.

== History ==
According to Poruna-raatr-uppadai, Karikala Chola fought Battle of Venni (now Kovilvenni) near Needamangalam in which both Pandya and Chera suffered crushing defeat. Besides the two crowned kings of the Pandya and Chera countries, eleven minor chieftains took their side in the campaign and shared defeat at the hands of Karikala. The Chera king, who was wounded on his back in the battle, committed suicide by starvation. Venni was the watershed in the career of Karikala which established him firmly on his throne and secured for him some sort of hegemony among the three crowned monarchs. Venni which is also known as Vennipparandalai and now it is known as Kovilvenni. Kovilvenni is situated at a distance of 3 km from Needamangalam.

== Geography ==
The town is surrounded by three rivers and town limit could not extend any more within those boundaries. Hence it is also named as Needatha Mangalam means "Limited Area". Needamangalam Taluk is crossed by the Vennar River in the north and the Koraiyar River in the south. Near the Bay of Bengal, the Venner River branches into three major distributaries, the northern branch retains its original name, Vennar. Other two branches are the Pamaniyar and the Koraiyar. They flow down to Muthupet Lagoon and from there join the sea.

=== Climate ===
Needamangalam is abutted by the Vennar River in the north and the Koraiyar River in the south. Needamangalam experiences abundant rainfall during rainy season and severe weather drop towards November and December of every year.

== Demographics ==
=== Population ===
According to the 2011 census, the taluk of Needamangalam had a population of 147,451 with 72,695 males and 74,756 females. There were 1028 women for every 1000 men. The taluk had a literacy rate of 74.99. Child population in the age group below 6 was 6,869 Males and 6,643 Females.

== Landmarks ==
- Cauvery Delta is known for rich heritage, culture, music and spirituality. Music and culture flourished during Sangam and Chola periods in the entire Delta region. Many musicians like Meenakshi Sundaram Pillai, Shanmugavadivel, Neelakanda Shastri who contributed to carnatic musics & experts in Tavil and Nadaswaram instruments based musics, prime cultural music played at wedding and temple festivals in Tamil Nadu were based out of Needamangalam.
- Apatsahayesvarar Temple, Alangudi or Guru Sthalam, a Hindu temple dedicated to Lord Shiva is one of the Navagraha (nine planets) temples situated in the Cauvery delta at a distance of 5 km from Needamangalam.
- There is an underground sub-way passage (currently abandoned) connecting Needamangalam Chathiram to Thanjavur Maratha Palace, originally built by Thanjavur Marathas for a secret and diplomatic escape route from Thanjavur Palace.
- Kovilvenni (3 km from Needamangalam) also known as "Venniparanthalai" is a famous place during Chola period for the celebrated battles between Uthiyan Cheral Athan and Chozhan Karikaal Valavan.
- The town of Needamangalam is a main hub for the villagers of the taluk, the majority of whom are farmers. Back in the 1950s - 1970's the town served as a wholesale market for paddy crops, and other crops.

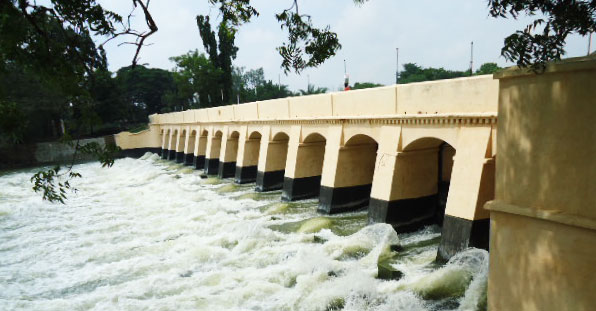
Nidamangalam Thalappu

- One kilometres from the town of Needamangalam, there is a spot called Munar Thalaippu, the Koraiyar headworks where three rivers discharge by means of fine masonry sluice. It is a picnic spot where the main Vennar branches into three distributaries namely Vennar, Koraiyar, Pamaniyar. The Water Storage and Dams were built by Cholas as a measure to control the flow during flood season and boost agriculture to the entire region. Huge crowd is witnessed during Diwali, Pongal festivals at this spot and the name "Neeradu Mangalam" to the town also comes from this aspect that it has got three rivers branching out. Government of Tamil Nadu recently named Munar Thalaippu as a State Tourism spot and announced financial packages, to improve facilities.

== Transport ==
=== Rail ===
Nidamangalam Junction railway station acts a connecting station to Mannargudi railway station. Trains connecting Mannargudi to various places like Chennai Egmore (Mannai express), Tirupati (Pamani Express), Coimbatore Chemmozhi Express. Thanjavur, Trichy, Nagapattinam, Karaikkal, Velankanni, Mayiladuthurai pass via Needamangalam. There is a long pending demand for a ROB at Needamangalam Junction which is announced during 2013-14 budget by Tamil Nadu Government and work in progress. The "Great Southern of India Railway", a.k.a. Southern Railway zone opened its first line for traffic between Nagapattinam and Tanjore in 1861 that runs via Needamangalam Junction. Subsequently, the line was extended up to Tiruchirappalli in March 1862.

=== Road ===
- SETC operates long distance daily day as well overnight buses from Mannargudi/Pattukottai to Chennai that runs via Needamangalam.
- SETC operates buses from Velankanni to various cities in Kerala and Nagercoil, Tamil Nadu and Bengaluru, Karnataka that runs via Needamangalam.
- Yogalakshmi Travels and Rathi Meena Travels operates daily bus services to Chennai.
- TNSTC, Kumbakonam operate buses to Trichy and Thanjavur, Kumbakonam, Mannargudi, Velankanni and Nagapattinam with the frequency of a bus in every five minutes.

=== Air/Sea ===
Nearest Airport is Tiruchirappalli International Airport at a distance of 80 km from Needamangalam, and nearest seaport is Nagapattinam Port at a distance of 50 km from the town.

== Notable people ==
- N. Gopalaswami - Former Chief Election Commissioner of India is from Needamangalam.
