= Vennaaru River =

River in Tamil Nadu, India

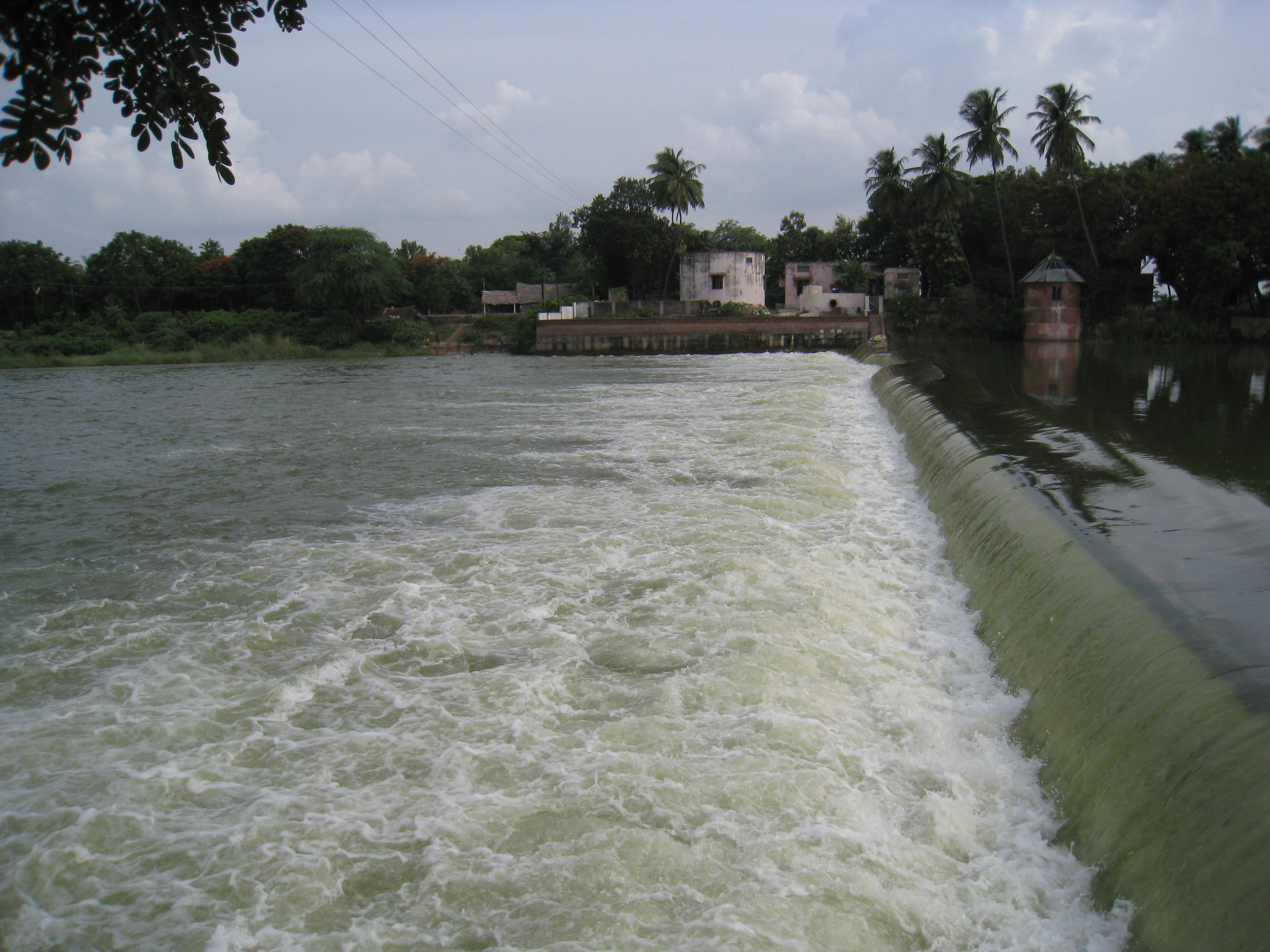
Vennaaru River

The Vennar River or Vennaaru is a river and distributary of the Kaveri River in the Kaveri delta. It flows through the Thanjavur, Tiruvarur, and Nagapattinam districts of Tamil Nadu, India. It was derived from Needamangalam with the names of Koraiyaru, Vennaru, Pamaniyaru.

== Course ==
The river begins at the Grand Anaicut at the eastern end of Srirangam Island, where it branches off from the Kaveri. After diverging from the Kaveri, the Vennar flows east. Northwest of Thennankudi, at the Thenperambur dam, the Vennar splits into a northern and southern branch. The northern branch becomes the Vettar River, while the southern branch continues east as the Vennar. The river flows to the north of Thanjavur and Ammapettai before turning to the southeast towards Needamangalam. Northwest of Needamangalam, there is another dam across the river, and the river splits again, into three branches. The Pamaniyar and Koraiyar Rivers begin as the two southern branches created by this divergence, while the Vennar continues through the northern branch.

After this divergence, the Vennar continues flowing southeast, and splits once again south of Koradacheri, with one branch initially flowing steadily southeast and later more to the south, while the other branch initially flows more steeply southeast and later flows steadily east. Both branches eventually rejoin in Nagapattinam district. After the convergence, the Vennar flows east again, before turning to the northeast and emptying into the Bay of Bengal south of Velankanni.

== History and Etymology ==
The name Vennaaru originates from the 'Venniaaru' which was constructed by Karikal Cholan after his famous victory at Vennipparanthalai battle. Like other rivers in the Kaveri delta, the Vennar was important for transportation during the Chola period. One branch of the river was dug out and expanded by the Chola King Parantaka I.

== Gallery ==
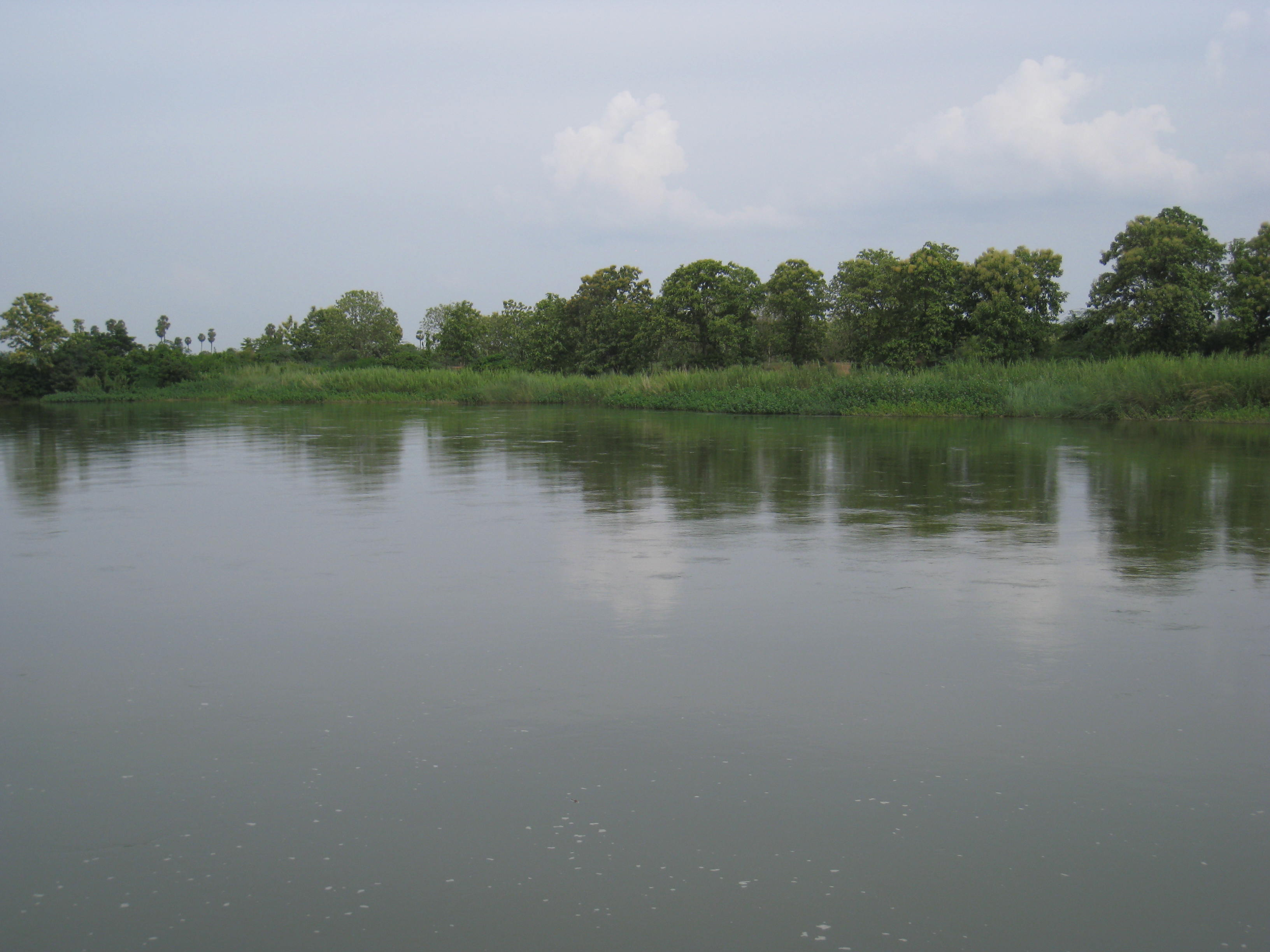
Vennaaru River

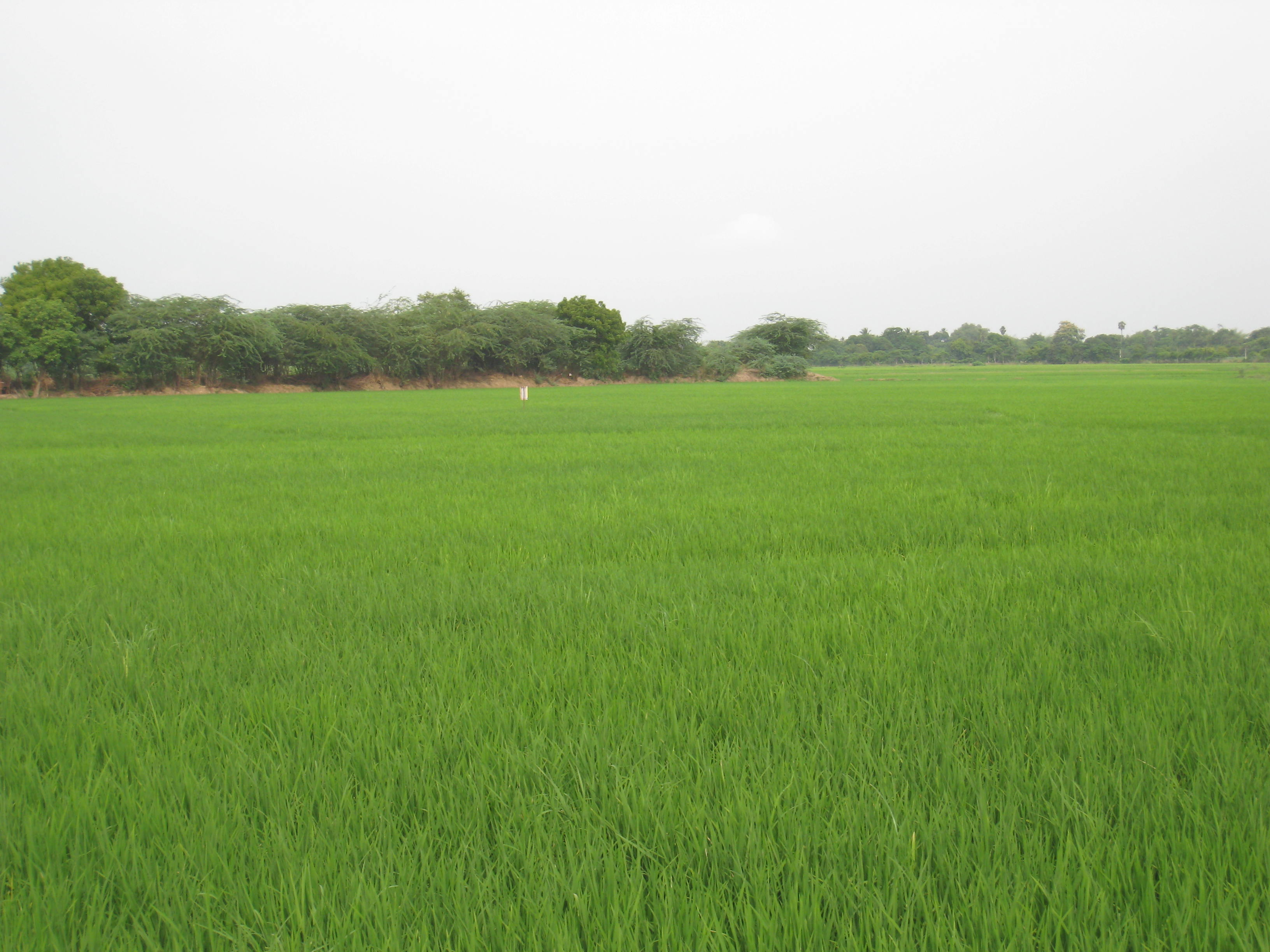
Paddy Fields around Vennaaru River
