= Kameswaram =

Kameswaram Thirupoondi East
- Village
- Interactive map of Kameswaram
- Coordinates: 10.61°N 79.83°E
- Country: India
- State: Tamil Nadu
- District: Nagapattinam
- Taluk: Kilvelur
- Ooratchi Ondriyam: Keezhaiyur
- Pincode: 611110

Government
  - Type: Grama Panchayat

Population
  - Total: 5,600
- Demonym: Indian

Languages
  - Official: Tamil
- Time zone: UTC+5:30 (IST)
- Postal code: 611110
- Vehicle registration: TN-51
- Lok Sabha constituency: Nagapattinam
- Legislative Assembly constituency: Kilvelur

Kameswaram is a coastal village in the Nagapattinam District of Tamil Nadu state in India. It is referred to as Thirupoondi East in government records. In 2018, it was one of the villages heavily affected by Cyclone Gaja.

Earlier, the 2004 Indian Ocean earthquake and tsunami had also destroyed much of the village, taken lives and negatively impacted its residents, mostly fishermen, farmers, shop keepers and labourers.

== Geography and demographics ==
Kameswaram contains nine administrative wards: Vairavankadu – I, Vairavankadu – II, Vettar Kadu, Meenavar Theru, Anaiyan Thoppu, Kallar Nagar, Sivan Koil Theru, Melakkadu, and Thandava Moorthi Kadu. There are 39 temples and a church spread over the nine wards. There are 61 traditional village ponds which are used to harvest rain water. The population of the village is heterogeneous including predominantly low-income and traditionally marginalized communities. According to the 2011 census of India, Kameswaram comprises about 1535 households.

== Facilities ==
=== Anganwadis and Schools ===
There are four functioning Anganwadis to take care of toddlers (from the age of 2) while their parents go to work. There are three government primary schools run by the village Panchayat. In addition, there is a government aided St. Sebastian Primary School. Finally, there are two private schools: the St. Valanar Primary School and the St Sebastian High school.

Nursing School and Dialysis Center

The Fundación Esperanza y Alegría of Spain set up the COHAJ hospital in Kameswaram in 2008. It now serves as a Auxiliary Nurse and Midwife training centre and offers dialysis services to local patients.

=== Sanitation, Eco-Innovation and a Rural Living Lab ===
In the aftermath of the tsunami Kameswaram was helped by many NGOs and international agencies, who left once their projects were completed. However, the NGO, Friend In Need India Trust or FIN created by the academic Shyama V. Ramani, decided to remain in the village, and open a Living Rural Lab for the development and introduction of pro-poor innovations to improve access to sanitation and clean water, community waste management as well as gender equality. FIN’s stewardship in Kameswaram mainly involved facilitating the construction, diffusion and improvement of existing Ecological sanitation models. The impact of the activities of Friend In Need Trust has been a notable reduction in open defecation and related diseases, improvement in adolescent health and school attendance, increased awareness and adoption of ecological and circular economy principles and replication of the sanitation model in other rural contexts. In 2007, Kameswaram village received the Nirmal Gram Puraskar or Clean Village award, heralding that its residents were ready to make the behavioural switch from open defecation to toilet usage. Since then, Kameswaram has been the site of multiple academic research studies contributing to reflections on inclusive innovation, development interventions and sanitation policy.
