= Arunachalesvarar Temple, Ammapettai =

Hindu temple in Tamil Nadu, India

Coordinates: 10.7992°N 79.3236°E

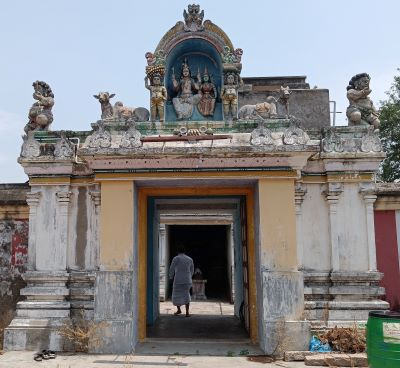
Arunachalesvarar Temple, Main entrance

Arunachalesvarar Temple is a Siva temple located at Ammapettai in Papanasam taluk, Thanjavur district of Tamil Nadu, India, at a distance of 21 km east from Thanjavur.

== Presiding deity ==
The presiding deity is Arunachalesvarar. The Goddess is known as Dharmasamvarthani. Though the main entrance is in the east, devotees prefer to come to the temple through the south entrance.

== Structure ==
The temple has prakara, vimana of the presiding deity and goddess. In the mahamandapa, the bali pitham and an image of Nandi are found. In the left Nataraja sabha, shrines of goddess and Navagraha are found. In the right side of the shrine of the sanctum sanctorum shrine of Somaskanda and in the left shrine of Vikramakali are found. In the prakara shrines of Vinayaka, Muruga, Kasilingam, Gajalakshmi, Ramalingam, Chandikesvara, Durga, Sanisvara, Bhairava and Sivasurya are found. In the kosta, Vinayaka, Dakshinamurti, Lingodbhava, Brahma and Durga are found.

== Puja ==
Puja is held twice. The festivals of this temple include Pradosha, Sankadaharasaturtti, Teypirai Ashtami, Karthikai Somavaram, and Tiruvathirai.

== Kumbhabhishekham ==
The Kumbhabhishekham of this temple was held on 15 September 2005.

== Photogallery ==
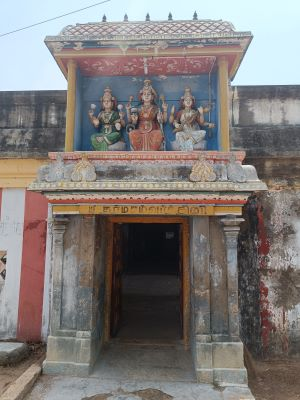
Southern entrance

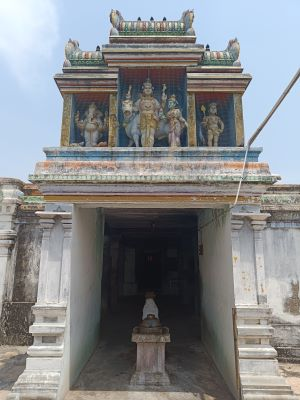
Facade of inner mandapa

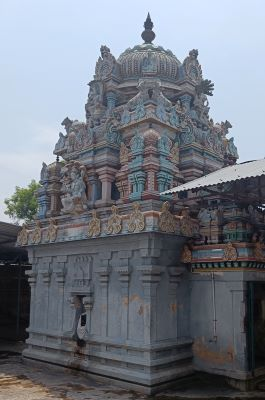
Vimana of the presiding deity

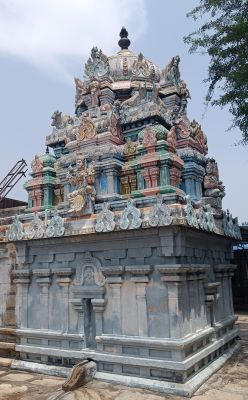
Vimana of the goddess

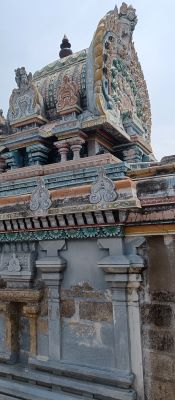
Vimana of Somaskanda

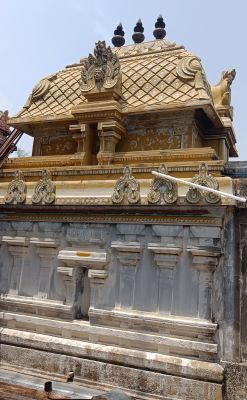
Vimana of Nataraja
