= Pamaniyar River =

River in Tamil Nadu, India

Coordinates: 10°20′N 79°30′E

The Pamaniyar or Pamani River is a non-perennial river in the Tiruvarur district of the Indian state of Tamil Nadu. The river is part of the Kaveri delta, and is in the southern part of that system. The Pamaniyar originates as a distributary of the Vennaaru River, which it branches off from at a dam northwest of Needamangalam in Needamangalam taluk. It flows south from this point into Mannargudi taluk, passing to the east of Mannargudi and Asesham. It continues to flow south, where its course is parallel to State Highway 202 for some distance. After it is joined on its right bank by the Kannanar River, its largest tributary, it flows southeast into Thiruthiraipoondi taluk. It then passes to the west of Muthupet before emptying into Muthupet Lagoon.

== See also ==
List of rivers of Tamil Nadu
