= Muthupet =

Town in Tamil Nadu, India

Muthupet Pearlpet City
- Muthupet Exam Level Municipality town
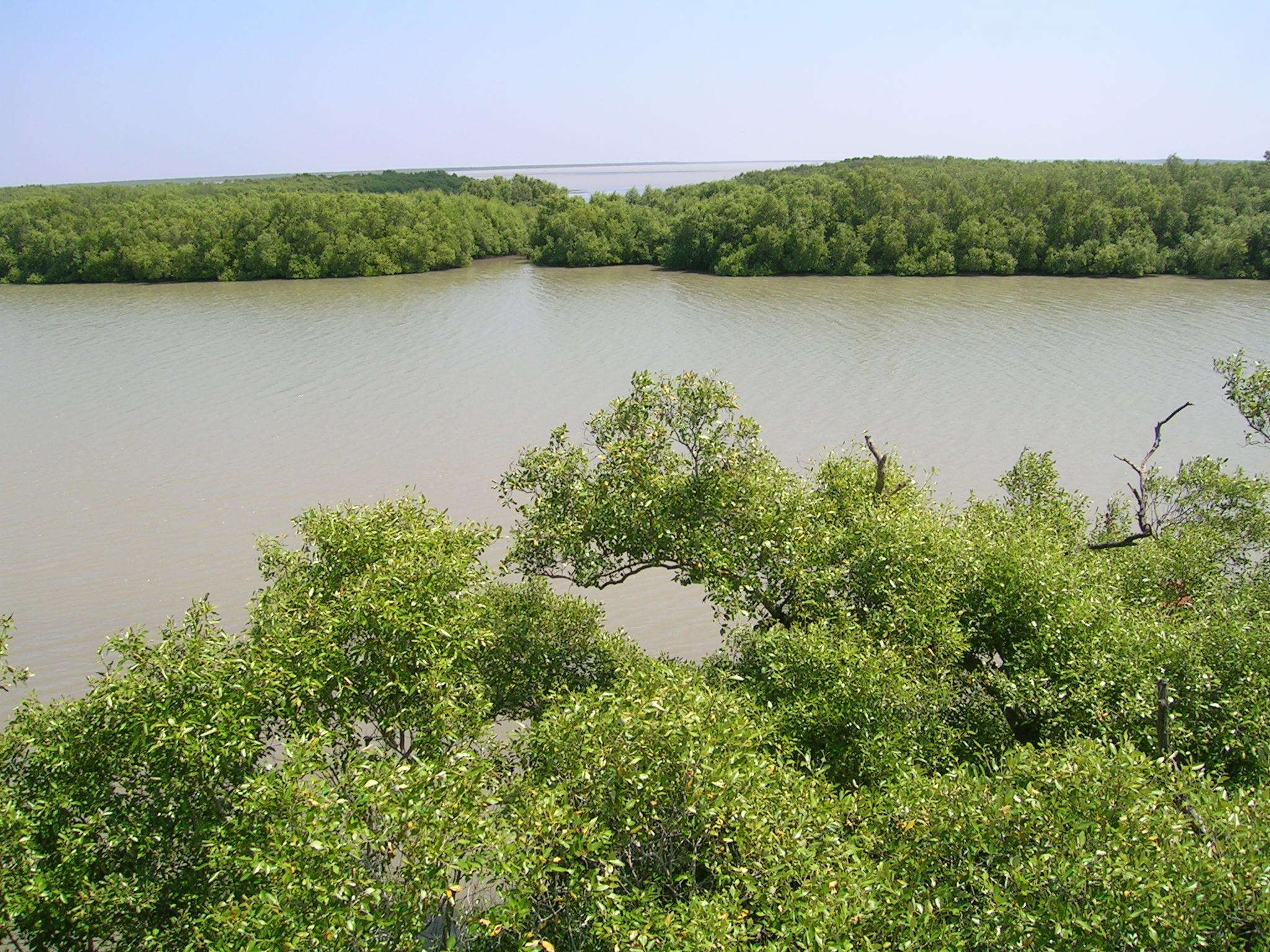
- A view of the lagoon and the ocean beyond
- Nickname: taluka city
- Location in Tamil Nadu, India
- Coordinates: 10.396°N 79.494°E
- Country: India
- State: Tamil Nadu
- District: Thiruvarur
- Area: Cauvery Delta
- Mandalam: Chola Nadu

Government
  - Type: Taluka City Town
  - Body: Muthupet Town Panchayat
  - Chairman: Dravida Munnetra Kazhagam

Area
  - Total: 11.80 km^{2} (4.56 sq mi)

Population (2011)
  - Total: 41,722
- Demonym: Muthupettaiyan

Languages
  - Official: Tamil
- Time zone: UTC+5:30 (IST)
- PIN: 614704, 614738
- Area code: 04369
- Vehicle registration: TN 50
- Website: http://www.townpanchayat.in/muthupettai

Muthupet is a panchayat town and taluk in the Thiruvarur district in the Indian state of Tamil Nadu. It is also known as Pearlpet. Muthupet comes under the Thiruthuraipoondi assembly constituency which elects a member to the Tamil Nadu Legislative Assembly every five years. The current member of the legislative assembly (MLA) is Marimuthu of the Communist Party of India, a part of the Nagapattinam (Lok Sabha constituency), which elects its member of parliament (MP) every five years. The Muthupet city in-town panchayat was constituted in 1962. The town comes under the administrative territory of the Thiruvarur District. It extends over an area of 11.80 km^{2}.

== Geography ==
Muthupet is a panchayat town and taluk in the Tiruvarur District. It is located between Thiruthuraipoondi and Pattukkotai, and around 360 km from Chennai. The town lies adjacent to the Bay of Bengal and is in the southernmost part of the Kaveri Delta. Muthupet is bordered by the Korayar and Bamaniyar rivers to the east and west respectively. The rivers Koriayar and Pamaniyar join near Muthupet, where a lagoon lies that is rich in fish.

Muthupet is a prominent location for fishing, pearl hunting, and bird hunting. Fishing industries are also prominent and produce finfish (koduva), shrimp and crab. A natural mangrove forest, Alayathi Kadu, is one of the largest of its kind in India.

In the early hours of 16 November 2018, Muthupet was heavily affected by Cyclone Gaja. Wind speed reached up to 140-160 kmph in Muthupet, devastating hundreds of huts and thousands of trees. Many houses were destroyed during the cyclone. As a result of over 500 electric poles and over 20 transformers falling down, Muthupet did not regain its power supply until 20 days after Cyclone Gaja struck.

=== Mangroves and lagoons ===
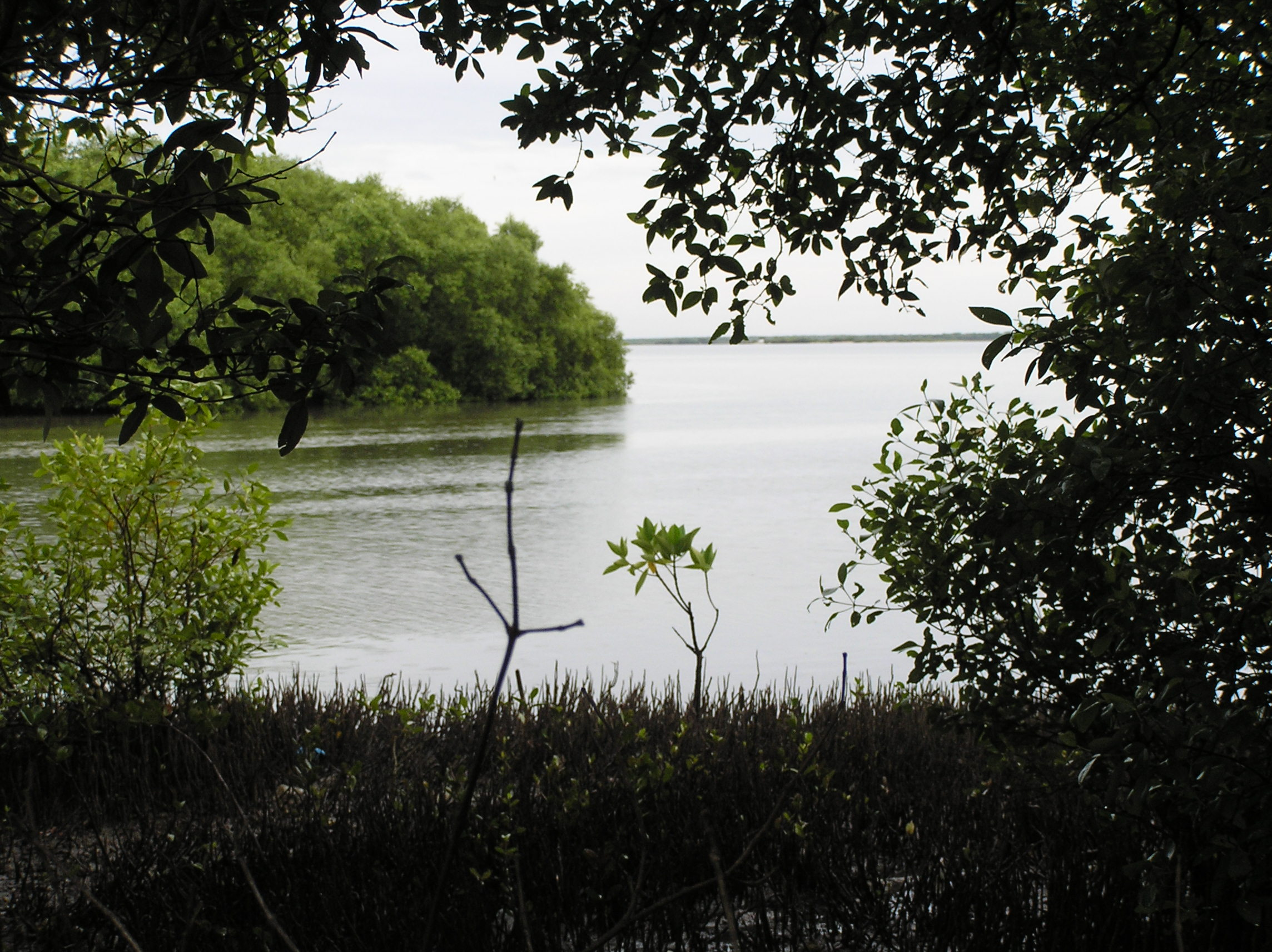

Muthupet mangrove forest is located at the southern end of the Kaveri delta, covering an area of approximately 13,500 ha of which only 4% is occupied by well-grown mangroves. The rivers Paminiyar, Koraiyar, Kilaithankiyar, Marakkakoraiyar and other tributaries of the river Kaveri flow through Muthupet and its adjacent villages. At the tail end, they form the Kaveri Lagoon before meeting the sea.

The northern and western borders of the lagoon are occupied by muddy silt ground which is devoid of mangroves. The mangroves beyond Muthupet Lagoon are discontinuously found along the shore and extend up to Point Calimere. Muthupet mangrove forest was under the control of Chatram Department from 1853 to 1912 (Chengappa, 1918). The government of the presidency of Madras Gazette (1937) shows that, from 1923 to 1936, half of the revenue obtained from selling mangrove products was paid to the revenue department and the remaining half was spent to maintain the "chatrams" (charity homes). The government declared the Muthupet mangrove forest as revenue forest in February 1937 and, accordingly, the mangrove forest was handed over to the forest department of the Madras presidency.

The forest is maintained by the Tamil Nadu Forest Department. The mangrove forest is divided into the Palanjur, Thamarankottai, Maravakkadu, Vadakadu, Thuraikadu and Muthupet reserve forests.

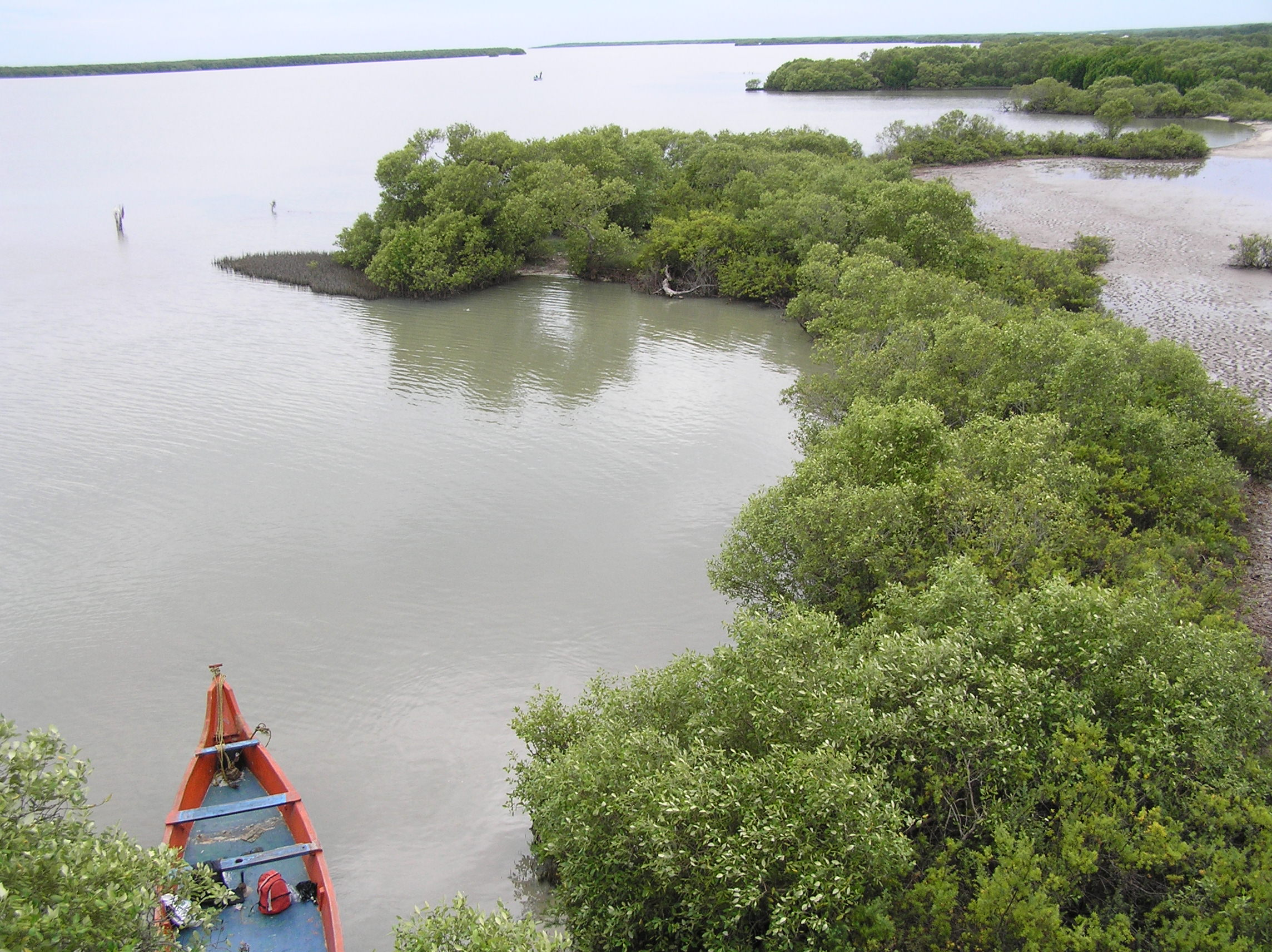

Muthupet reserve forest covers the lagoon, river creeks and the mudflats. Muthupet Lagoon (Mullipallam) is a natural lagoon that is 8 km from nearby Muthupet town and can only be reached by boat. The lagoon is shallow with an average depth of 1 m. The bottom of the lagoon is formed of silt clay substratum. The tidal fluctuations can be observed by the exposure of oyster beds and roots during low tide.

These tidal fluctuations play a major role in dispersing mangrove seeds. Dense mangroves mostly cover the lagoon shore. Islets are found on the western side and submerged during high tide. The salinity is a major environmental factor that controls zonation of Muthupet mangrove forest. Avicennia marina is the single dominant plant species.

The southern mudflat separates the lagoon from the adjacent sea, which creates a permanent lagoon mouth with seasonal shallow waterways. The width of the mudflat increases from the lagoon mouth to the east. The mudflat is dry in summer, but the presence of dead gastropods under the surface soil layer and the erosion of soil at the centre of the mudflat cause the submergence of the mudflat during floods. The distance of the mangroves from the fluctuating water level differs between the lagoon shore and seashore of the same mudflat.

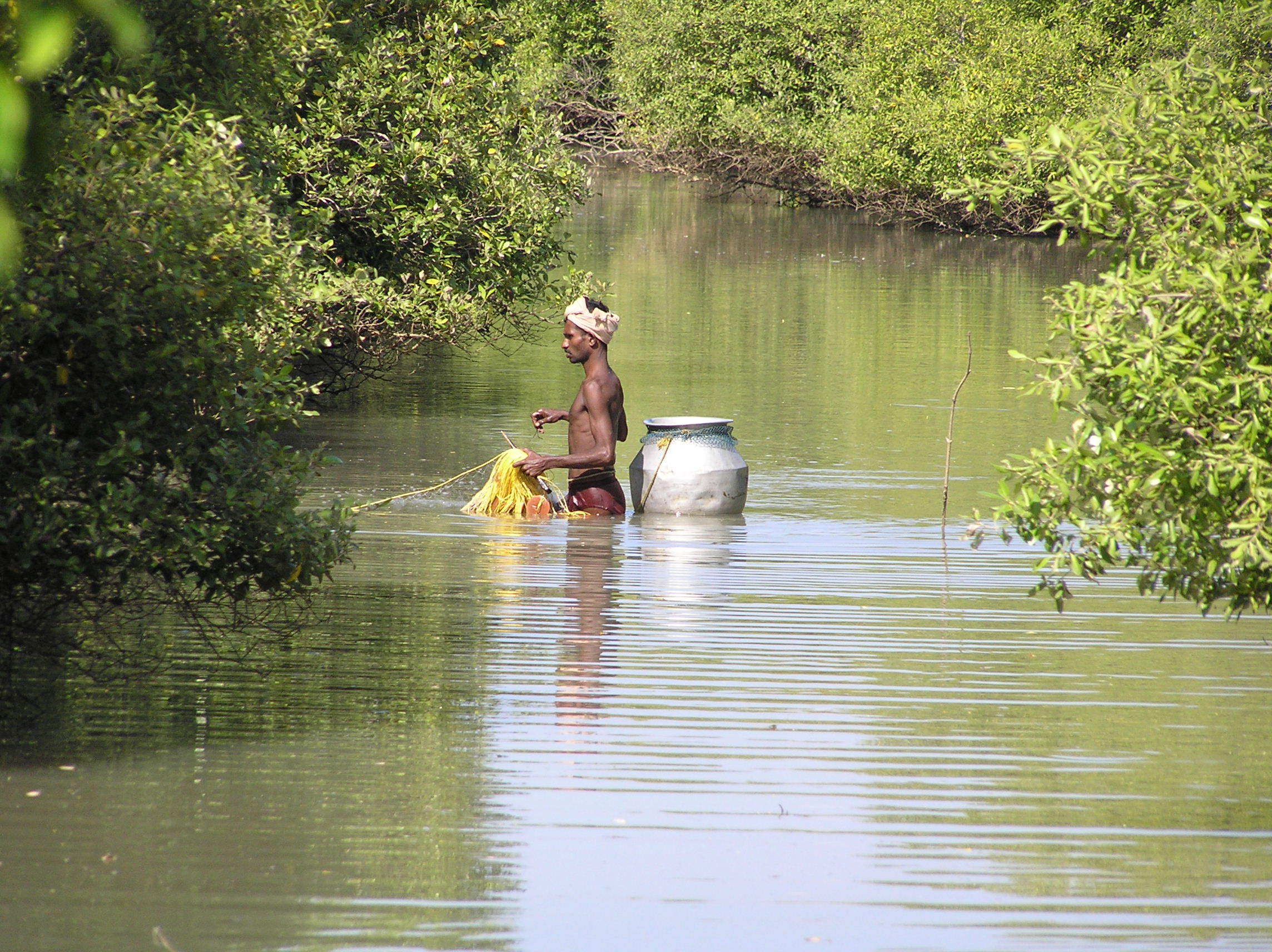

The mangroves have grown close to the water level at the lagoon side but not at the seashore. The reason may be the difference in the nature of fine clayey silt deposition that is carried by the rivers. The salt marshes are found under herb as well as lining the inner side of the forest. In the degraded central part of the mudflat, the soft fine silt is found only around the salt marshes. The remaining barren ground is hard clay, which may be due to the erosion of the surface silt by wind or floodwater. Thousands of partially decomposed rooted trunks found on the southeastern side of Muthupet lagoon are indications of past, indiscriminate exploitation.

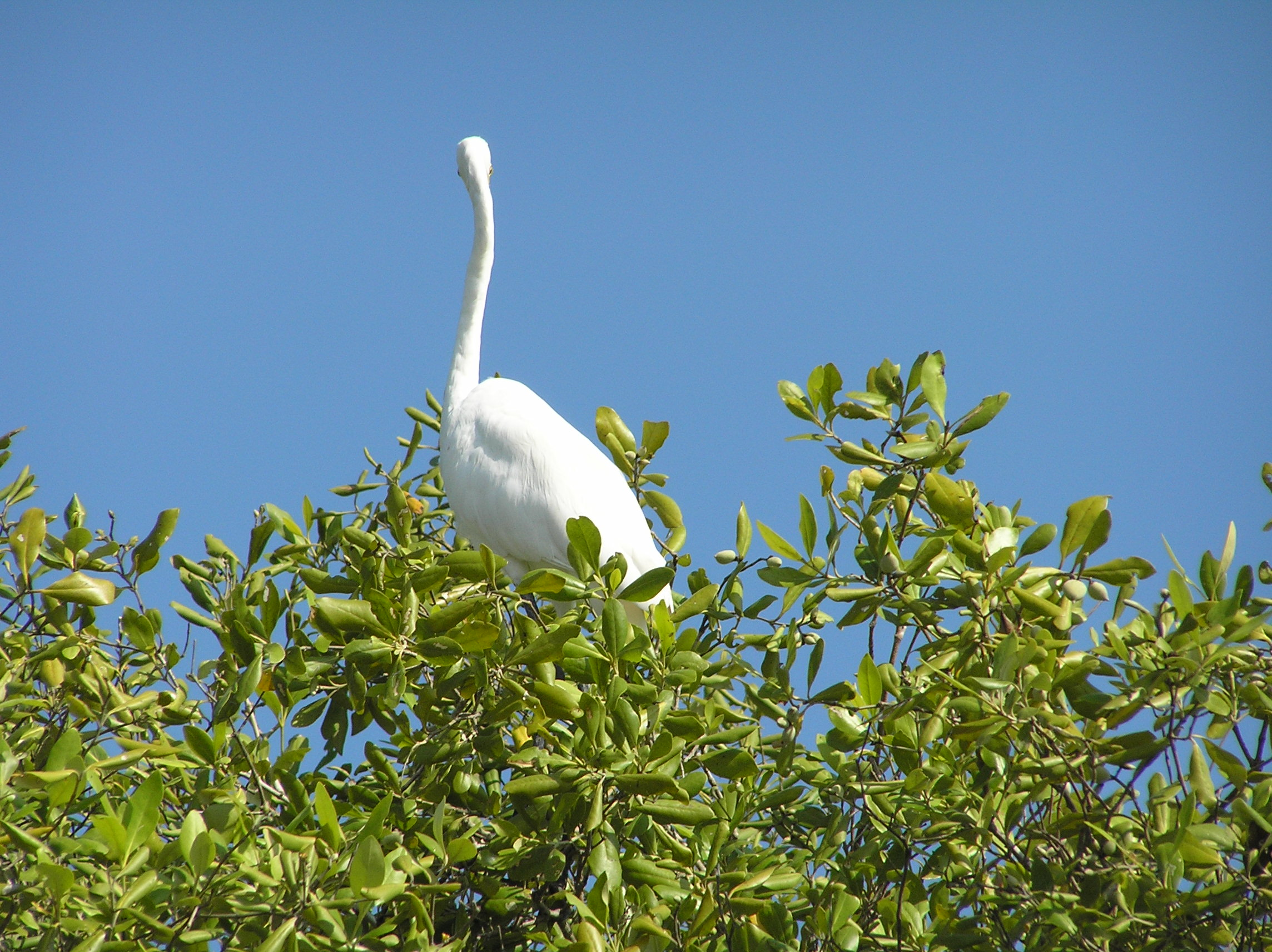

At 100–150 m in width and 5–6 km in length, the density of mangroves in the eastern side of Muthupet lagoon is comparatively lower than other areas. Tamil Nadu Forest Department has excavated several canals across the mudflat. Each main canal, which enhances the water movement between sea and lagoon, has several sub canals on either side with a substantial number of mangrove seedlings. The western side has a protruding land pocket that has formed an islet-like structure. This part of the lagoon lies near Koraiyar river mouth with small mangrove patches.

== Demographics ==
Religious census
Religion	Percent(%)
Muslim	76%
Hindu	21%
Christian	2.5%
Other	0.5%

Historical population
Year	Pop.	±%
1901	7,765	—
1911	8,515	+9.7%
1921	9,543	+12.1%
1931	10,323	+8.2%
1941	13,765	+33.3%
1951	14,878	+8.1%
1961	17,123	+15.1%
1971	19,232	+12.3%
1981	23,032	+19.8%
1991	28,545	+23.9%
2001	36,313	+27.2%
2011	41,722	+14.9%
Source: 1901 – 2011: As of 2011 India census,

Muthupet has a population of 41,722. Males constitute 47% of the population and females 53%. Muthupet has an average literacy rate of 71%, higher than the national average of 59.5%: male literacy is 78%, and female literacy is 65%. Islam is the major religion, with an estimated 76.4% of the population being Muslims within the town.

Tamil is the official language and is predominantly spoken. The most commonly used dialect is the Central Tamil dialect.

== Utility services ==
Electricity supply to Muthupet is regulated and distributed by the Tamil Nadu Electricity Board (TNEB). The city, along with its suburbs, is part of Tiruchirappalli Electricity Distribution Circle.

Muthupet comes under the Thanjavur Telecom circle of the Bharat Sanchar Nigam Limited (BSNL), India's state-owned telecom and internet services provider. Apart from telecom, BSNL also provides broadband internet service.

== Economy ==
Economic activity in Muthupet includes coconut farming, and aqua farms. The traditional occupation of the local people is fishing, and there are two fish markets in town

The Muthupet Bazaar serves the town and its suburban villages.

== Politics ==
=== Elected ward members ===
DMK - 9

SDPI - 4

ADMK - 3

INC - 1

BJP - 1

== Infrastructure ==
The town houses a government hospital along with several private hospitals/clinics. The Muthupet police station serves the town as well as the surrounding villages. Government establishments like the post office, sub-registrar office, municipality office, village panchayat office, Tamil Nadu Forest Department, customs preventative unit and government library have their base in the town.

Muthupet has four petrol stations that sell petrol, diesel and oil to the public. It also has a good mobile phone network. Mobile network operators such as BSNL, Airtel, Vodafone, Jio and Reliance provide their services. In addition, wireless WI-FI connections named Med WI-FI are provided by the Med Group. The town also has a number of internet browsing cafes.

== Tourism ==
The 700-year-old Islamic shrine Muthupet Dargah of Andavar Sheikh Dawood Khamil Oliyullh was built using traditional architecture. People irrespective of caste, creed and religion visit this holy Dargah. Most visitors are from Kerala and Karnataka, although international visitors attend from Pakistan, Bangladesh, Sri Lanka, Malaysia.

== Transport ==
The town is well connected via road and rail with major towns and cities in Tamil Nadu. The East Coast Road (ECR) from Chennai to Kanyakumari also connects the town. Frequent bus services are available to the nearby town, Pattukkottai, Adirampattinam, Thiruthuraipoondi, Nagapattinam, Mannargudi and Vedaranyam. There are 11 private omnibuses that run daily night services for passengers as well as freight to Chennai in addition to the state-owned TNSTC regular passenger services.

Auto rickshaws act as a major mode of private transportation for short-distance travels. For long travels, local people use private taxis.

Muthupet Railway Station is on the Karaikkudi-Thiruvarur broadguage line. Thiruvarur-Karaikudi-Thiruvarur rail has a daily service except on Sundays. The Ernakulam - Velankanni - Ernakulam express also operates on Sundays but there is no stop at Muthupet railway station. A Tri-weekly superfast express train operated between Tambaram - Sengottai - Tambaram through this route which provides Muthupet a direct connectiviy to the state capital by train. Muthupet town has connectivity with the (Hyderabad) state capital of Telangana through the train secunderabad - Rameswaram - Secunderabad as a weekly special service. As of November 2023 there is a special train making journeys through the thiruvarur - karaikudi section called Tirunelveli - Chennai Egmore - Tirnelveli weekly special connects Muthupet with the Tirunelveli.

Tiruchirapalli airport is the nearest international airport and is located around 110 km from Muthupet.

The town used to be a small seaport during the British period. The old customs building near the coast stands as a landmark site in Muthupet.

By rail

City	Distance (in km)
Chennai	371
Mumbai	1655
Bangalore	444
New Delhi	2561
Pattukkottai	21
Thiruvarur	50
Adirai	15

By road

City	Distance (in km)
Pattukkottai	21
Thiruthuraipoondi	23
Mannargudi	34
Thiruvarur	60
Thanjavur	65
Nagapattinam	65
Tiruchirappalli	110
Chennai	348
Coimbatore	320
Thoothukudi	275
Madurai	165
Kilakarai	160
Adirampattinam	15
Kayalpattinam	302
Vedaranyam	40

- All are approximate distances.

== Education ==
Muthupet has a number of educational institutions.

- Government Boys Higher Secondary School, Muthupet
- Winners Matriculation School, Alangadu, Muthupet
- K.A.P Govt Girls Higher Secondary School, Muthupet
- மதியழங்காரம் தொடக்கப் பள்ளி, Near Arab shahib Masjid, Pettai Road, Muthupet
- Govt Middle School, Pettai
- Rahmath Girls Matriculation Higher Secondary School, Abdul Kasim Nagar, Pkt Road, Muthupet
- Brilliant Matriculation Higher Secondary School, PKT Road, Muthupet
- A.N. Aidded (SANGATH) Primary School, Pettai Road, Muthupet
- O.M.A School, O.M.A Garden, Jambavanodai, Muthupet
- Al'Maha Primary School, New Bus Stand
- New Street Govt Primary School, Old Bus Stand, Muthupet
- Saraswathi Vidhyalaya Matriculation Higher Secondary School, Ecr-Mannai Salai, Muthupet
