= Venni Karumbeswarar Temple =

Hindu temple in Tamil Nadu, India

Coordinates: 10.78°N 79.35°E

Religion
- Affiliation: Hinduism
- District: Tiruvarur
- Deity: Lord Shiva

Location
- Location: Koilvenni in Tiruvarur district
- State: Tamil Nadu
- Country: India
- Interactive map of Venni Karumbeswarar Temple

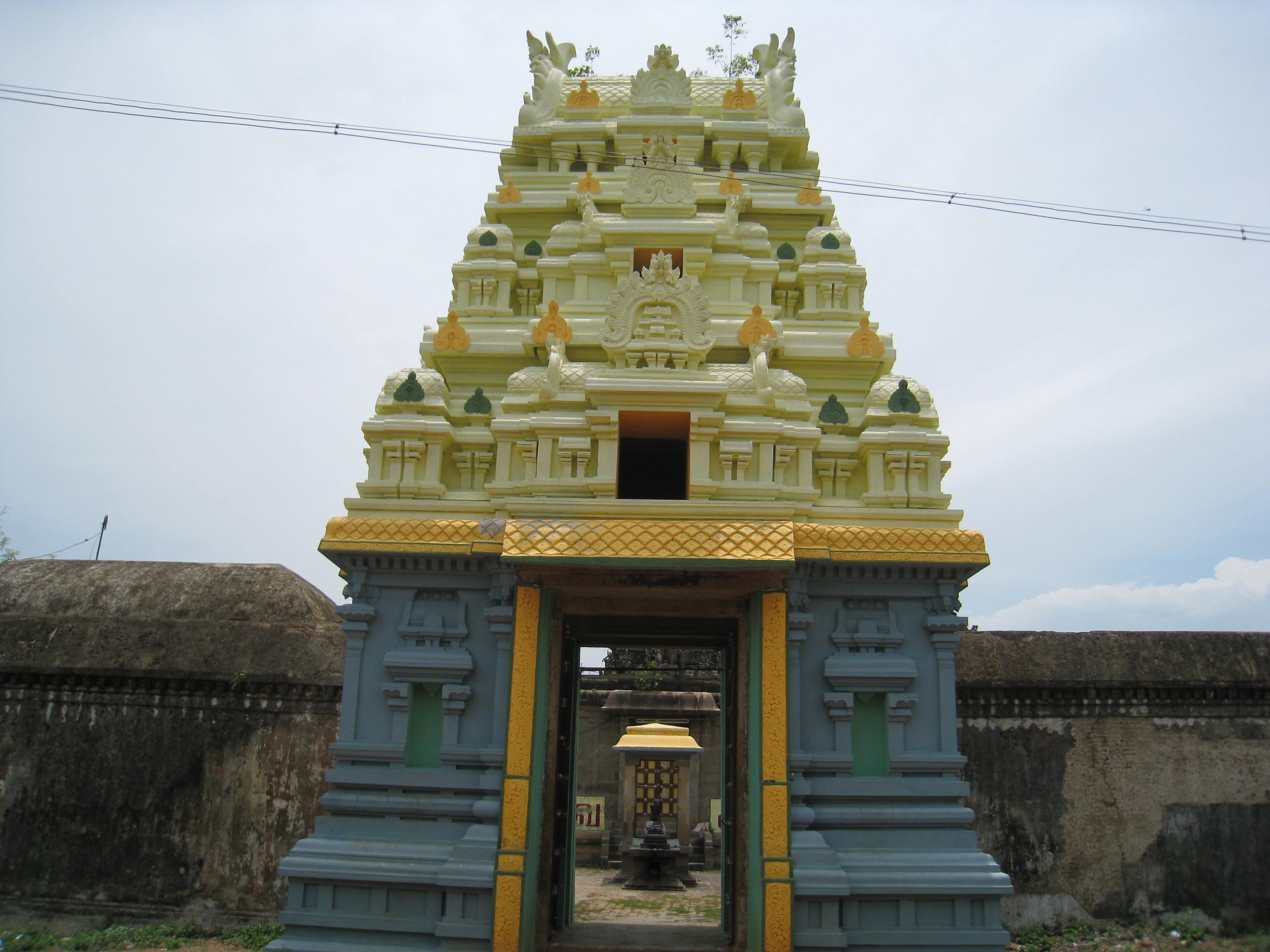
Karumbeswarar temple entrance

Venni Karumbeswarar Temple is a Hindu temple located at Koilvenni in Tiruvarur district, Tamil Nadu, India. The temple is dedicated to Shiva, as the moolavar presiding deity, in his manifestation as Karumbeswarar. His consort, Parvati, is known as Soundaranayagi. The historical name of the place is Tiruvenni.

== Significance ==
It is one of the shrines of the 275 Paadal Petra Sthalams - Shiva Sthalams glorified in the early medieval Tevaram poems by Tamil Saivite Nayanars Tirugnanasambandar and Tirunavukkarasar. It is also believed that patients suffering from diabetes will be cured of the disease if they make an offering of sugar to the main deity at this temple."Karumbu" in Tamil means sugarcane and the main linga is in the form of a bunch of sugarcane stems tied together.

== Gallery ==
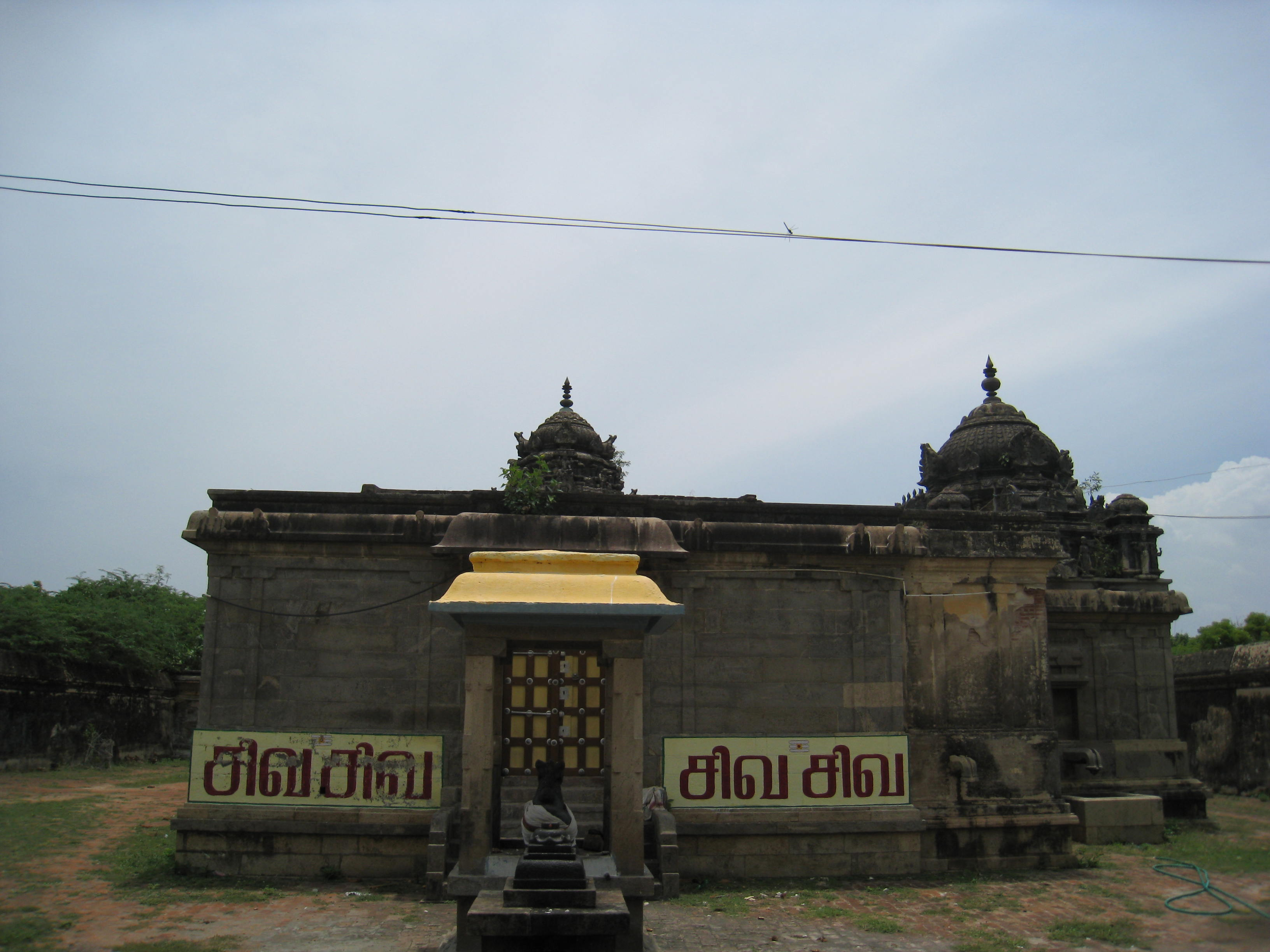
Profile

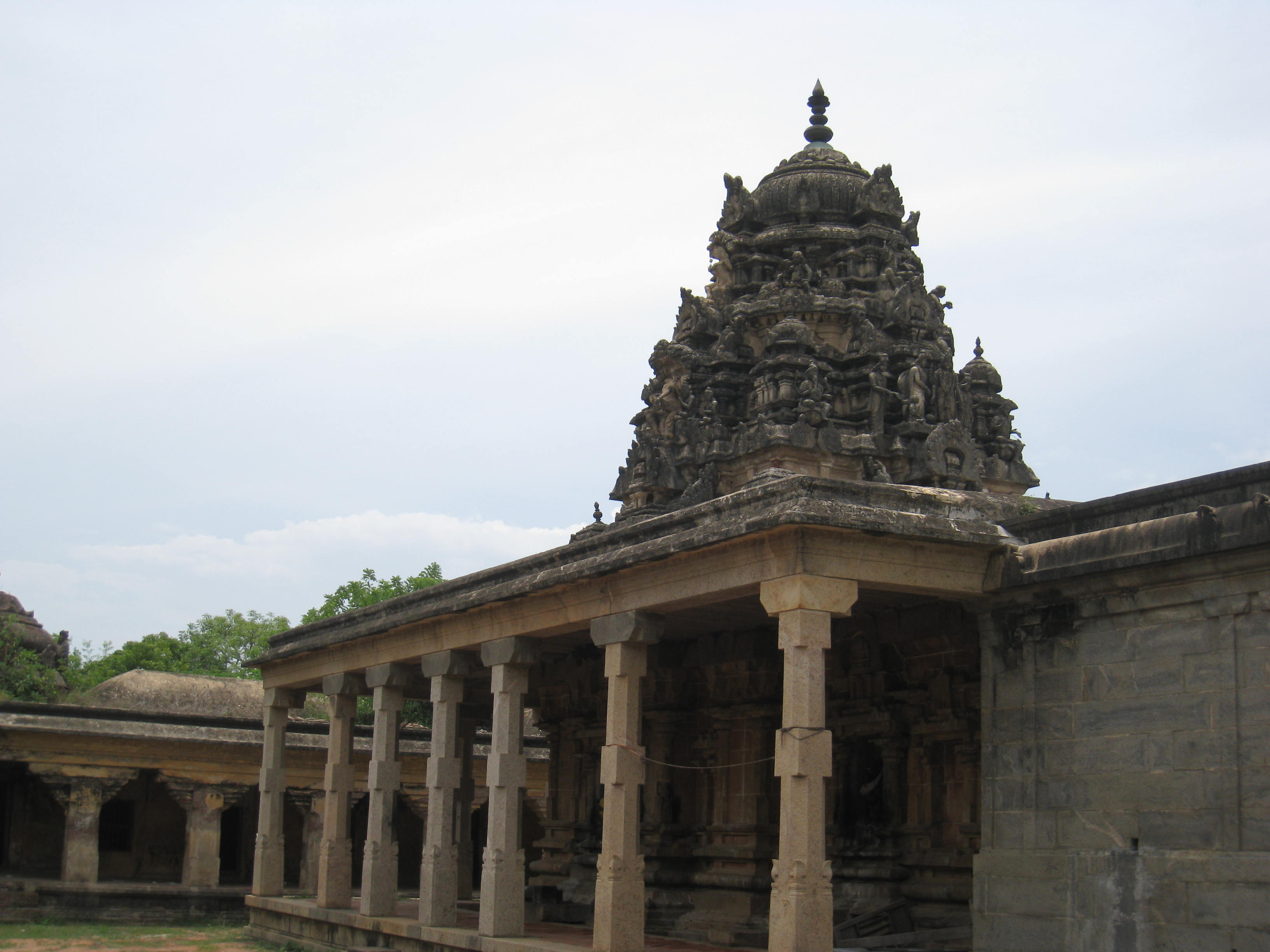
Another profile

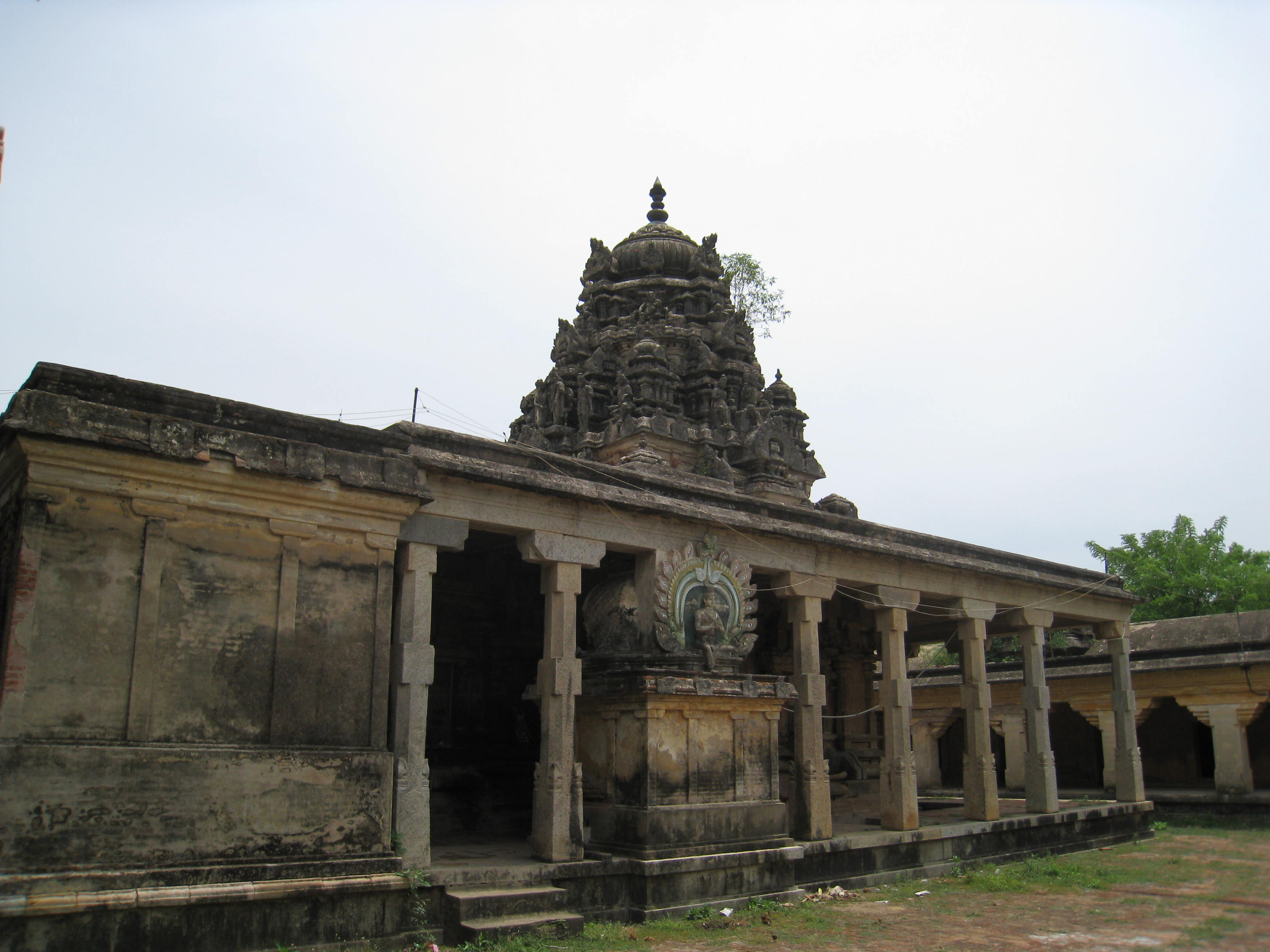
Profile and courtyard

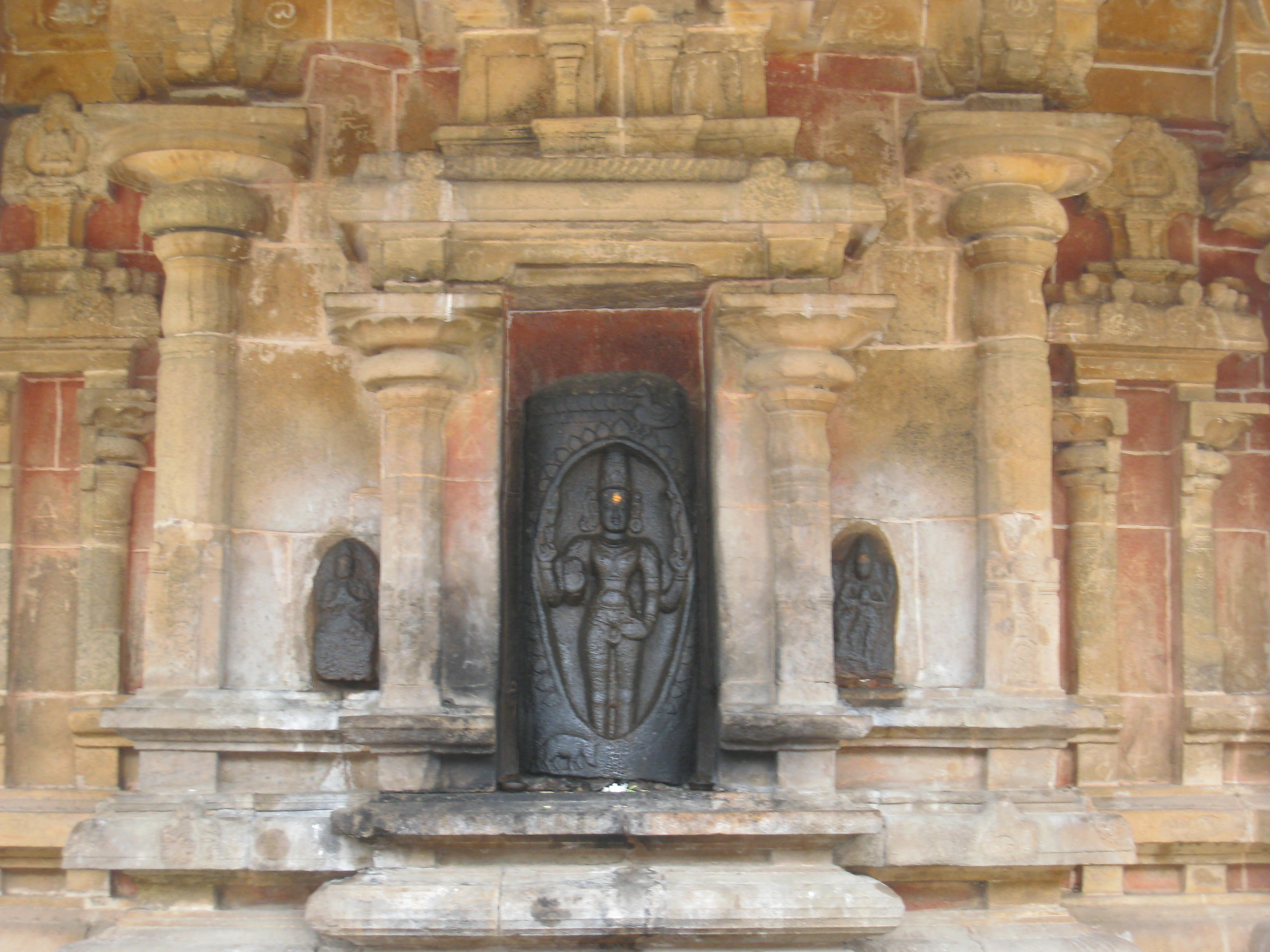
Sculpture

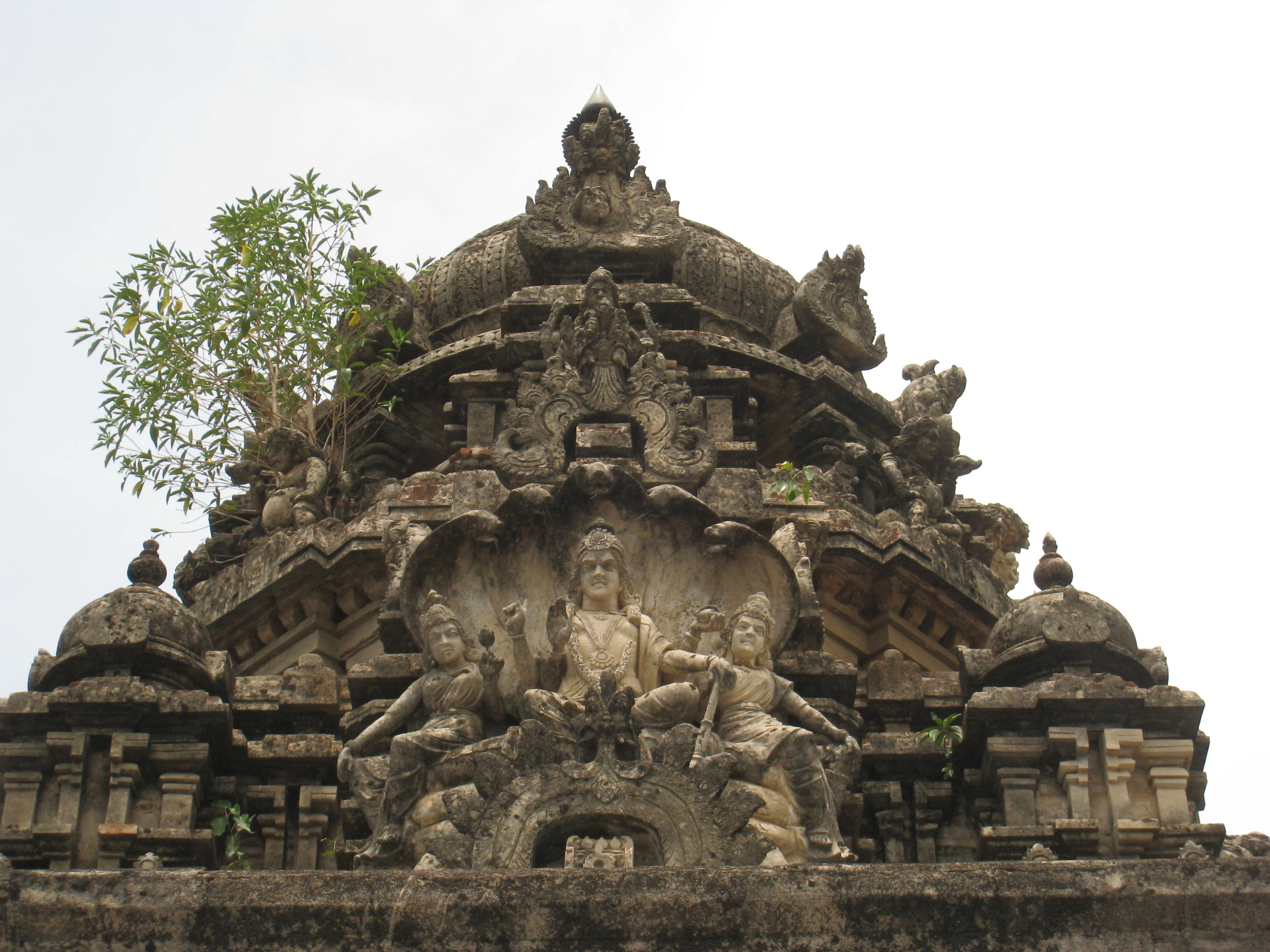
Vimana detail
