= Cyclone Gaja =

North Indian Ocean cyclone in 2018

Very Severe Cyclonic Storm Gaja
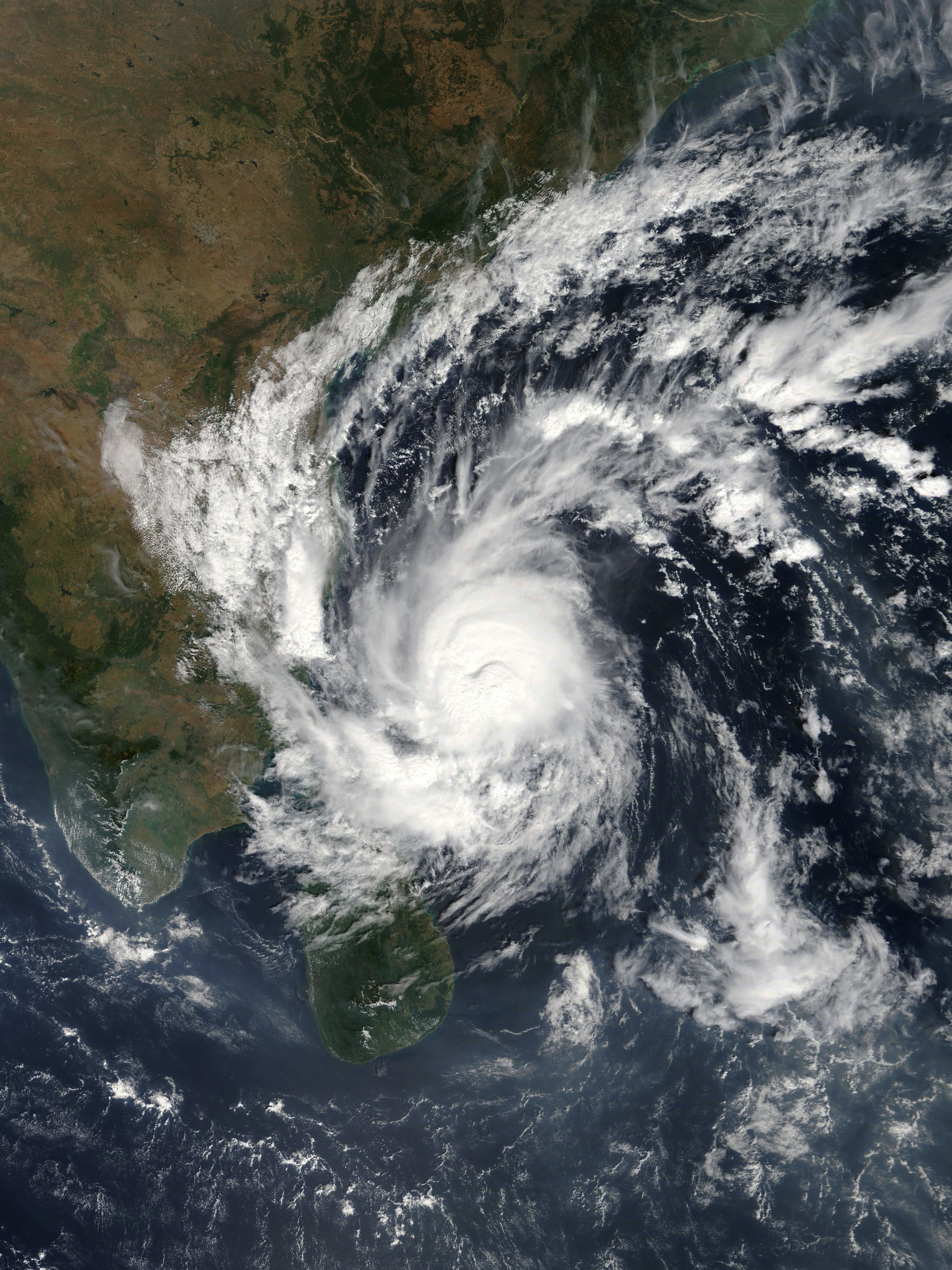
- Cyclone Gaja nearing South India on 15 November

Meteorological history
- Formed: 10 November 2018
- Remnant low: 19 November 2018
- Dissipated: 22 November 2018

Very severe cyclonic storm
- 3-minute sustained (IMD)
- Highest winds: 130 km/h (80 mph)
- Lowest pressure: 976 hPa (mbar); 28.82 inHg

Category 1-equivalent tropical cyclone
- 1-minute sustained (SSHWS/JTWC)
- Highest winds: 150 km/h (90 mph)
- Lowest pressure: 963 hPa (mbar); 28.44 inHg

Overall effects
- Fatalities: 52 total
- Damage: $775 million (2018 USD)
- Areas affected: Southern Vietnam, Malay Peninsula, Andaman Islands, Sri Lanka, Southern India (Tamil Nadu, Puducherry)
- IBTrACS
- Part of the 2018 North Indian Ocean cyclone season

Very Severe Cyclonic Storm Gaja (Note: The name Gaja (Sinhala: ගජ, [gadʒa]) was contributed by Sri Lanka and means "elephant" in Sinhala.) was a deadly and damaging tropical cyclone that brought significant effects to South India. The sixth named storm of the very active 2018 North Indian Ocean cyclone season, Gaja originated from a low-pressure system over the Gulf of Thailand that was first monitored by the India Meteorological Department (IMD) on 7 November. The system then crossed over Southern Thailand and the Malay Peninsula, moving westward into the Andaman Sea. Under conditions favourable for strengthening, the weak system intensified into a depression over the Bay of Bengal on 10 November and further intensified into a cyclonic storm early on 11 November, being named Gaja. After tracking west-southwestward for a number of days in the Bay of Bengal, Gaja made landfall in South India late on 15 November, moving westward through Vedaranyam, Thiruthuraipoondi, Mannargudi, Muthupet, Pudukkottai, Adirampattinam, Pattukkottai, and Peravurani. The storm then tracked into the Arabian Sea; however, it degenerated into a remnant low under hostile conditions only a few days later, before dissipating early on 22 November. 45 people were killed by the storm. 8 people were killed in the town of Pattukottai alone. Gaja had severe impacts in South India, particularly in Tamil Nadu. After Cyclone Gaja, Tamil Nadu sought Rs 15,000 crore from the Indian central government to rebuild.

== Meteorological history ==
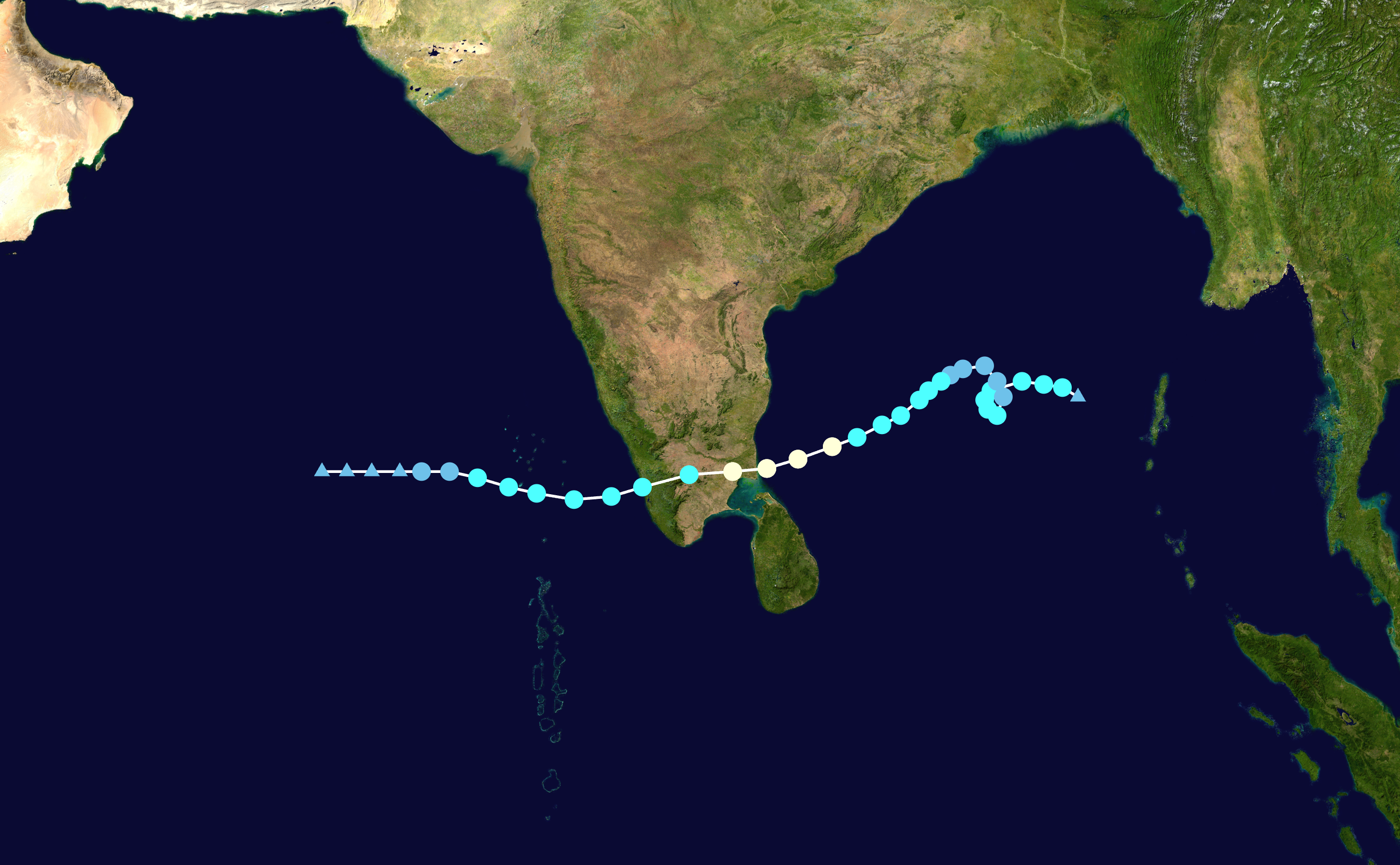
Map plotting the storm's track and intensity, according to the Saffir–Simpson scale Map key Saffir–Simpson scale Tropical depression (≤38 mph, ≤62 km/h) Tropical storm (39–73 mph, 63–118 km/h) Category 1 (74–95 mph, 119–153 km/h) Category 2 (96–110 mph, 154–177 km/h) Category 3 (111–129 mph, 178–208 km/h) Category 4 (130–156 mph, 209–251 km/h) Category 5 (≥157 mph, ≥252 km/h) Unknown Storm type Tropical cyclone Subtropical cyclone Extratropical cyclone, remnant low, tropical disturbance, or monsoon depression

On 7 November, the India Meteorological Department (IMD) began monitoring the Bay of Bengal for the potential of tropical cyclogenesis. The next day, a low-pressure area formed over the Gulf of Thailand, with the IMD noting that conditions were favourable for organisation in the Bay of Bengal. As a result, the system consolidated into a well-marked low-pressure area over the north Andaman Sea by 12:00 UTC on 9 November. The Madden–Julian oscillation (MJO) supported enhanced convective activity over the southern Bay of Bengal and surrounding areas, with the southeastern bay hosting warm sea surface temperatures of 28–29 °C (82–84 °F) and low wind shear. Under these favourable conditions, the system organised into a depression by 03:00 UTC on 10 November over the central Andaman Sea. Simultaneously, the Joint Typhoon Warning Center (JTWC) issued a Tropical Cyclone Formation Alert (TCFA) on the system.

The system moved west-northwestward into the southeastern Bay of Bengal, intensifying further into a deep depression by 12:00 UTC that day. Six hours later, the JTWC initiated advisories on the system as Tropical Cyclone 07B. By 00:00 UTC on 11 November, under persistent favourable conditions, the system intensified into a cyclonic storm and thus received the name Gaja. The cyclone continued moving westward before executing a cyclonic loop throughout the next day. Gaja then tracked west-southwestward under the influence of an anticyclone over the Arabian Sea. It intensified into a severe cyclonic storm over the southwestern Bay of Bengal by 03:00 UTC on 15 November, before further intensifying into a very severe cyclonic storm 12 hours later as it approached the Tamil Nadu coast. By 18:00 UTC, the IMD assessed that Gaja reached its peak intensity, with 3-minute sustained winds of 130 km/h (81 mph) and a minimum central pressure of 976 mbar (28.8 inHg). Shortly thereafter, Gaja made landfall between Nagapattinam and Vedaranyam and proceeded to track inland. No longer supplied with moist air from the Bay of Bengal, the cyclone rapidly weakened inland, becoming a severe cyclonic storm by 00:00 UTC on 16 November before being further downgraded to a cyclonic storm three hours later.

Disorganisation continued, with Gaja becoming a deep depression inland over Tamil Nadu by 06:00 UTC on 16 November, and a depression six hours later. Steered by an upper tropospheric ridge, the depression continued moving westward, emerging over the southeastern Arabian Sea by 00:00 UTC the next day. Despite low wind shear and warm sea surface temperatures, Gaja struggled to intensify, and dry air intrusions disrupted the cyclone early on 19 November. As a result, the IMD assessed that Gaja had weakened into a well-marked low-pressure area by 18:00 UTC that day, whereas the JTWC discontinued advisories one day prior.

== Preparations ==
=== India ===
==== Tamil Nadu and Puducherry ====
The IMD began warning of heavy rainfall over coastal Tamil Nadu early on 10 November. On 12 November, the IMD forecasted up to 1 metre (3.3 ft) of storm surge for the cities of Nagapattinam and Cuddalore in Tamil Nadu and the city of Karaikal in Puducherry. The next day, this forecast was extended to the Thanjavur, Pudukkottai, and Ramanathapuram districts. Early on 14 November, coastal Tamil Nadu and Puducherry were placed under a cyclone warning.

In advance of Gaja's landfall, the state government of Tamil Nadu deployed nine National Disaster Response Force teams and seven State Disaster Response Force units. The teams were stationed in the districts of Nagapattinam, Cuddalore, Thanjavur, Pudukkotai, Ramanathapuram, and Tuticorin. At least 3,124 volunteer first responders, 368 medical teams, and 315 veterinary teams were mobilised to aid in evacuations and for post-cyclone response. About 80,000 people were evacuated to 470 relief camps from the districts that were deemed vulnerable to the cyclone. Holidays were announced in the coastal districts of the Cauvery delta region in Tamil Nadu and in Puducherry. Train services to and from Rameswaram were either cancelled or partially restricted on 15 November, with some services remaining cancelled on 16 November. Several universities in Tamil Nadu postponed exams originally scheduled for 16 November.

==== Elsewhere ====
Starting on 10 November, the IMD began warning for isolated heavy rainfall over the Andaman and Nicobar Islands. Two days later, heavy rainfall warnings were additionally issued for southern Andhra Pradesh and Kerala. On 16 November, heavy rainfall was warned for Lakshadweep. On 17 November, the IMD forecasted up to 0.5 metres (1.6 ft) of storm surge for Lakshadweep.

== Impact ==
=== India ===
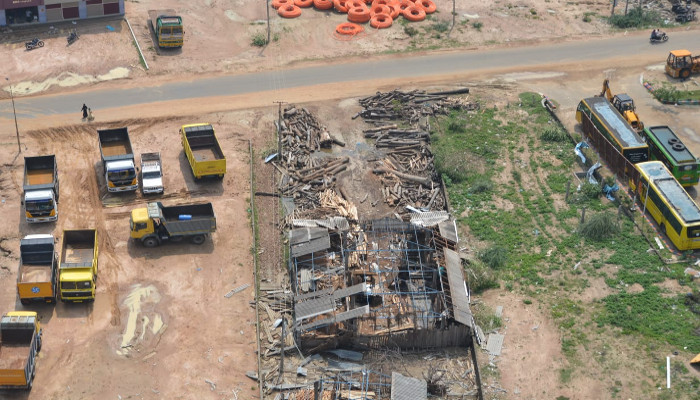
Damage in coastal Tamil Nadu.

==== Tamil Nadu and Puducherry ====
Up to 1.8 m (5.9 ft) of storm surge was reported in Kodikkarai. An estimated 1.6 m (5.2 ft) of storm surge inundated Karaikal Beach. The surge partially silted canals supplying tidal waters to coastal mangrove forests. The towns of Thiruthuraipoondi and Muthupet both recorded 17 cm (6.7 in) of rainfall on 16 November. The following day, Sivaganga reported 17 cm (6.7 in) of rainfall. Adiramapattinam reported a maximum wind speed of 117 km/h (73 mph), and Nagapattinam reported maximum winds of 100 km/h (62 mph).

About 86,000 electric poles, 800 transformers, 200 electricity substations, and 5,000 boats were destroyed by the cyclone. Thousands of birds and livestock died due to the cyclone's effects. More than 1,000 hectares (2,500 acres) of banana plantation were damaged in the town of Orathanadu. About 18,000 hectares (44,000 acres) hectares of coconut trees were damaged, with damage being particularly severe in the Cauvery delta region. 56,000 hectares (140,000 acres) of crops and trees were destroyed due to the cyclone. In total, roughly 7.5 million trees were damaged or felled due to high winds. The Shrine Basilica at Velankanni in Nagapattinam was heavily damaged.

Damages to electrical infrastructure operated by the Tamil Nadu Power Distribution Corporation Limited (TNPDCL) were estimated to total around ₹10.5 billion (US$120.5 million). A total of 52 deaths were reported in Tamil Nadu due to Gaja, including four construction workers who were killed by a landslide in Kodaikanal.

==== Elsewhere ====
In the Andaman and Nicobar Islands, Long Island reported a 24-hour rainfall total of 14 cm (5.5 in) on 10 November. Mayabunder reported 10 cm (3.9 in) of rainfall that same day, with an additional 7 cm (2.8 in) reported the following day.

Kerala was affected by heavy rainfall on 17 November, with recorded 24-hour totals of 28 cm (11 in) in Kozha and 19 cm (7.5 in) in Piravam. Landslides caused by heavy rainfall were reported in Idukki district, Kerala. Landslides partially destroyed a home and destroyed farmland in Vattavada, whilst a bridge was damaged. Sections of National Highway 49 were flooded. In Ernakulam district, two houses were destroyed, with a further 199 damaged. Damages in Ernakulam were estimated to total ₹380,0000 (US$4,300). Downed trees were reported to have damaged electrical infrastructure.

=== Sri Lanka ===
Gaja impacted Sri Lanka's northern districts. In the Jaffna District, the Disaster Management Centre reported that 90 houses had been destroyed with an additional 978 houses partially damaged, requiring the relocation of families to relief camps. Over 55,000 banana trees were felled in Kopay.

== Aftermath ==
A total of 828 relief centres were mobilised in Tamil Nadu, providing temporary shelters and aid for 122,754 families. A set of relief articles was provided to affected households in the state. Heavy machinery and power saws were utilised to remove over 1.3 million uprooted trees and clear roads from obstructions. The Indian Red Cross Society (IRCS) continued supporting relief efforts in Tamil Nadu into early 2019. Relief included kitchen supplies, towel saris, and mosquito nets. In a 2019 report on Gaja's effects, the National Disaster Management Authority released a series of recommendations to improve tropical cyclone preparedness. Recommendations included improving relief logistics and the construction of cyclone-resistant structures.

== See also ==
- Cyclone Vardah – took a similar track across South India
- Cyclone Thane – impacted similar areas
