= Battle of Venni =

Early historic south Indian battle

Date	c. 190 CE
Location	Venni
Result	Victory for Karikala Chola

Belligerents
Cholas	Pandyas; Cheras; Minor velir chieftains

Commanders and leaders
Karikala Chola	Pandya ruler; Perum Cheralathan ‡‡; Velir chieftains

Battle of Venni (c. 190 CE) was a military engagement fought by the early historic Chola ruler Karikala against a confederacy led by the Pandya and Chera rulers. Venni is generally identified with Kovil Venni east of Thanjavur, Tamil Nadu.

A confederacy of eleven rulers, led by the Chera and Pandya, including several minor velir chieftains, were defeated at Venni.

The Chera ruler, named "Cheraman Perum Cheralathan", was wounded on the back while leading the warriors (pierced by a shaft). Not being able to bear the disgrace, he committed suicide by slow starvation ("Sitting by Facing the North"). It is said that some of his companions also committed suicide unwilling to part with him.

The Chera ruler generally is identified with "Adu Kottu Pattu" Cheralathan.
