= Koraiyar River (Tirunelveli district) =

River in Tamil Nadu, India

The Koraiyar River is a river in the Ambasamudram taluk of the Tirunelveli district of the Indian state of Tamil Nadu. It is a right-bank tributary of the Thamirabarani River, which flows through Tirunelveli and Thoothukudi districts. It is formed by the confluence of the minor Vadakkur Koraiyar and Therkku Koraiyar rivers, which are its headwater streams, on the eastern slopes of the Western Ghats. It flows for a total length of 13.2 kilometres (8.2 mi) before flowing into the Kannadian channel near the village of Vellankuli upstream of the Kannadian anicut. The channel bypasses the anicut before joining the Thamirabarani downstream and to the east of the dam. Along its course it is joined by three tributaries, the Vandal Odai, Elumichaiyar, and Koppuraiyar rivers. The Koraiyar's drainage basin covers an area of 75.75 square kilometres (29.25 sq mi) and has a recorded maximum flood discharge of 12000 cusecs.

== See also ==
List of rivers of Tamil Nadu
