= Muthupet Lagoon =

Body of water on the Bay of Bengal

Coordinates: 10.323°N 79.521°E

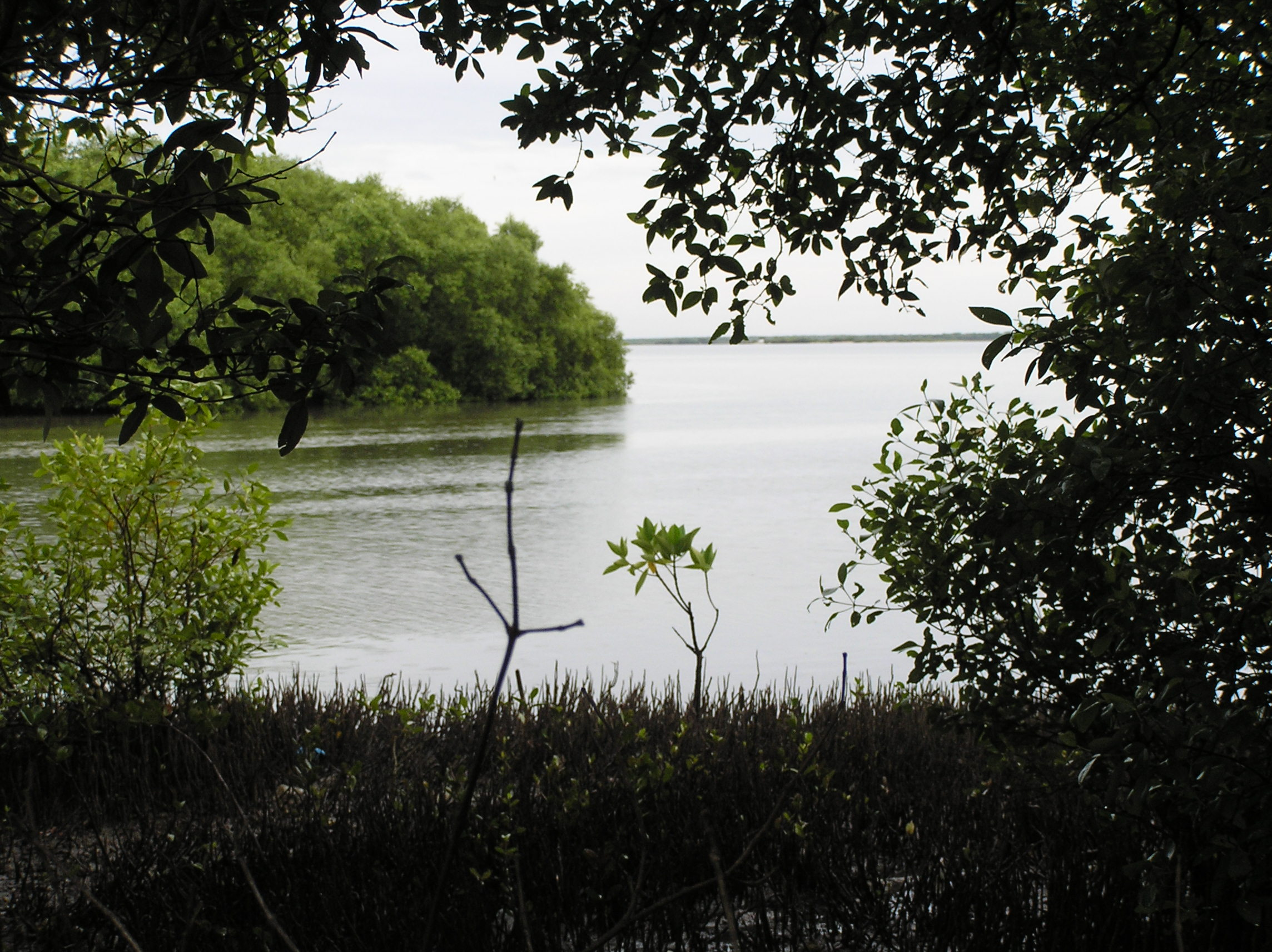

Muthupet Lagoon is located at the southern end of the Cauvery river delta on the Bay of Bengal, covering an area of approximately 6,803.01 ha of which only 4% is occupied by well-grown mangroves. The rivers Pamaniyar, Koraiyar, Kilaithankiyar, Marakkakoraiyar and other tributaries of the Cauvery flow through the area and adjacent villages. At the tail end, they form a lagoon before meeting the sea. The northern and western borders of the lagoon are occupied by muddy, silty ground, which is devoid of mangroves. The mangroves beyond the lagoon are found intermittently along the shore and extend up to Point Calimere. The mangrove forest was under the control of Chatram Department from 1853 to 1912 (Chengappa, 1918). The Government of the Presidency of Madras Gazette (1937) shows, from 1923 to 1936, half of the revenue obtained from selling mangrove products was paid to the revenue department and the remaining half was spent to maintain the "Chatrams" (Charity homes). The Government declared the Muthupet mangrove forest as a revenue forest in February 1937 and accordingly the mangrove forest was handed over to the forest department of the Madras Presidency.

The forest is maintained by the Tamil Nadu Forest Department. The entire mangrove forest is divided into Palanjur reserve forest, Thamarankottai reserve forest, Maravakkadu reserve forest, Vadakadu reserve forest, Thuraikadu reserve forest and Muthupet reserve forest.

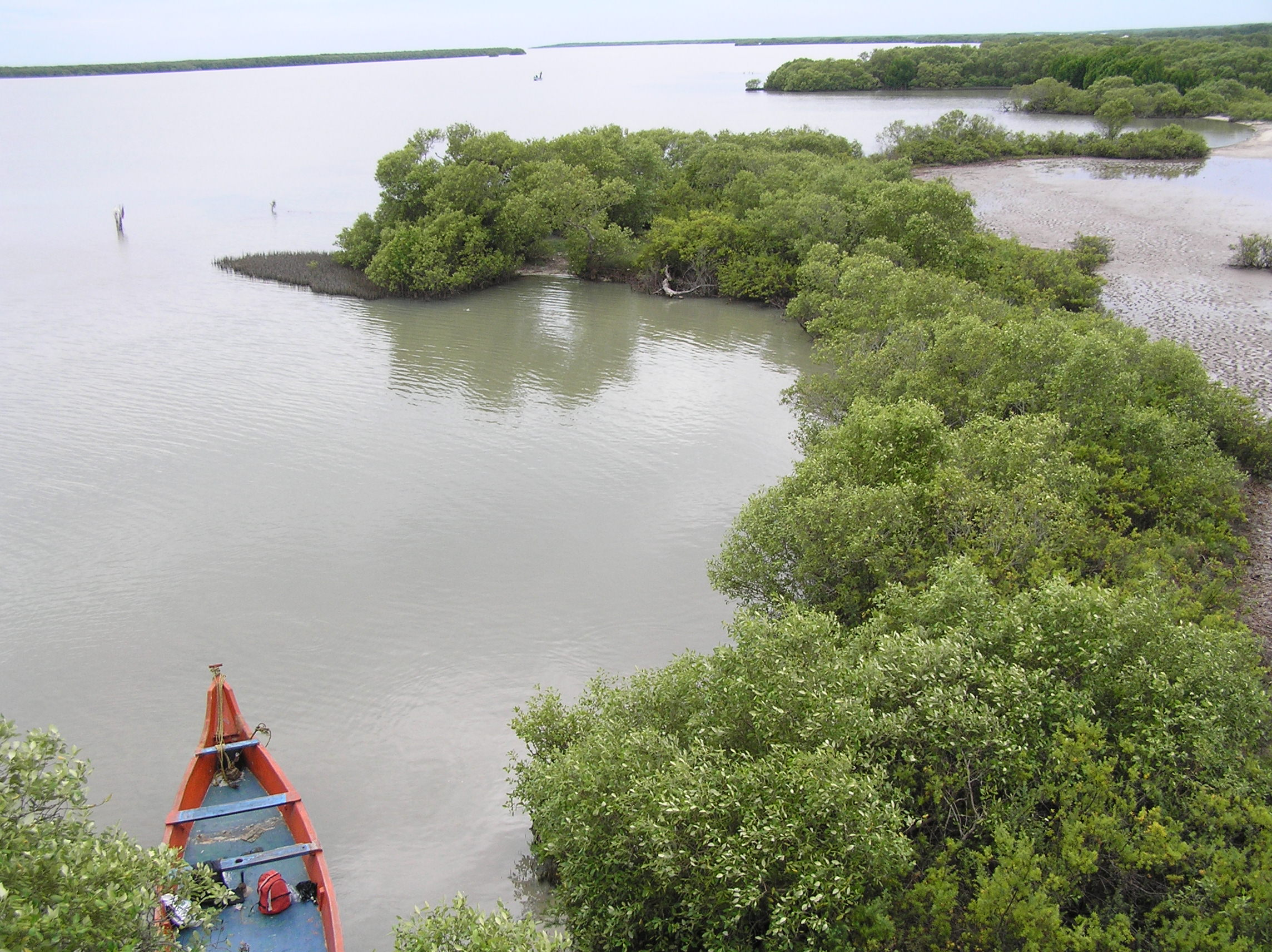

The word 'lagoon' refers to the shallow salt or brackish water body that lies close to the sea. Muthupet reserve forest covers the lagoon, river creeks and the mudflats. Muthupet (mullipallam) Lagoon is a spectacular natural creation, which is 8 km from nearby Muthupet town and can be reachable only by boat. The lagoon is shallow with the average of 1m depth. The bottom of the lagoon is formed of silt clay substratum. The tidal fluctuations can be observed well with the exposure of oyster beds and roots during low tide.

The tidal fluctuations are playing a major role in dispersing the mangrove seeds. Dense mangroves mostly cover the lagoon shore. The islets are found on western side which are submerged during high tide. The salinity is the major environmental factor, controlling zonation of Muthupet mangrove forest. Avicennia marina is the conqueror of the forest which is found as a single dominant species.

Southern side (mud flat) separates the lagoon from adjacent sea that also leaves a permanent mouth of lagoon with seasonally opened shallow waterways. The width of mudflat is increased from lagoon mouth to the eastern direction. The mudflat looks like a desert in summer, but the presence of dead gastropods under the surface soil layer and the erosion of soil at the centre of mudflat reveal the submergence of mudflat during flood. There is a difference between the lagoon shore and seashore of the same mudflat, in the aspect of distance of mangroves from fluctuating water level.

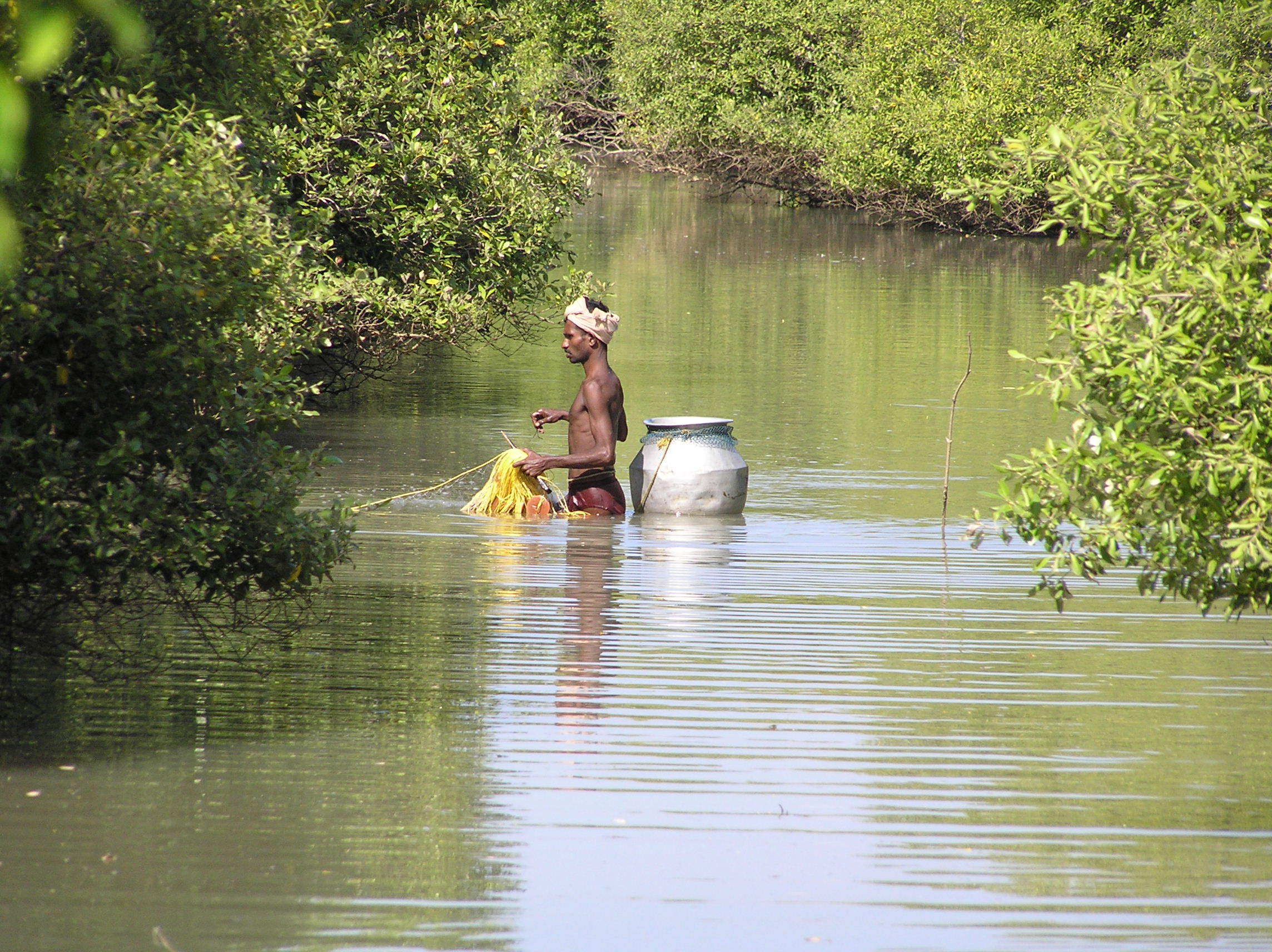

The mangroves have grown close to water level in lagoon side but not in seashore. The reason may be the difference in the nature of fine clayey silt deposition that carried by the rivers. The salt marshes are found as under herb as well as lining the inner side of the forest. In the degraded central part of the mudflat, the soft fine silt is found only around the salt marshes. But, the remaining barren ground is hard (clay) which may due to the erosion of surface silt by wind or floodwater. Thousands of partially decomposed rooted trunks that found on the southeastern side of Muthupet lagoon are indicating the past, indiscriminate exploitation.

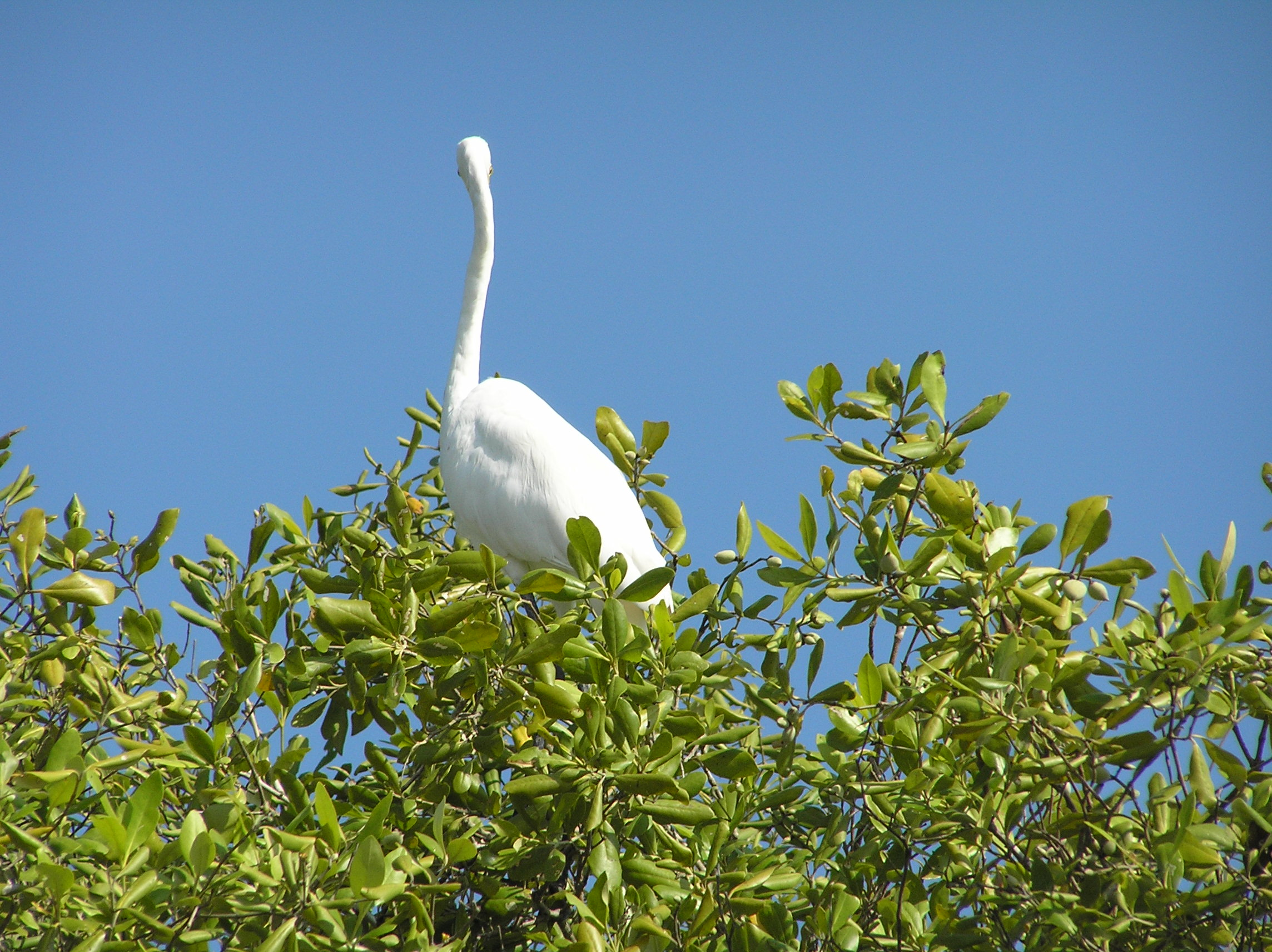

(100–150 m in width and 5–6 km in length). The density of mangroves in eastern side of Muthupet lagoon is comparatively lower than other areas. Tamil Nadu forest department has excavated several canals across the mudflat. Each main canal which enhances the water movement between sea and lagoon, has several sub canals on either side with a substantial number of mangrove seedlings. The western side is not straight a protruding land pocket has formed an islet like structure. This part of the lagoon lies near to Koraiyar river mouth with small mangrove patches.
