= Ammapettai, Thanjavur =

Ammapettai
- Town panchayat
- Location in Tamil Nadu, India
- Coordinates: 10°47′44″N 79°19′14″E
- Country: India
- State: Tamil Nadu
- District: Thanjavur
- Elevation: 1 m (3.3 ft)

Population (2001)
  - Total: 13,816

Languages
  - Official: Tamil
- Time zone: UTC+5:30 (IST)
- PIN: 614401
- Telephone code: 04374
- Vehicle registration: TN49 / TN68

Ammapettai is a panchayat town in Thanjavur district in the state of Tamil Nadu, India.

== Demographics ==
As of 2001 India census, Ammapettai had a population of 13,816. Males constitute 49% of the population and females 51%. Ammapettai has an average literacy rate of 73%, higher than the national average of 59.5%; with 54% of the males and 46% of females literate. 10% of the population is under 6 years of age.

This village has three public schools, Gov. high School, Appavuthevar Higher Secondary School Regina Celi Girls Higher Secondary School, Saint Marcinas matriculation school and Laxmi Vidhyalaya school.Private Hospital more have There are two other private schools.

== Transport ==
Railway Station : Ammapettai (approx 2.5 km From Bus stand Thanjavur going Bus many Have and Trichy,velangani,thiruvarur,nagapattinam,chennai,madurai,mannargudi,kumbakonam Bus fexility Have
