= List of villages in Pudukkottai district =

Pudukkottai district, Tamil Nadu, India.

== A ==
- Akkachipatti
- Alapiranthan
- Alathur
- Aliyanilai
- Amanji
- Amaradakki
- Amarasimendrapuram
- Ammachathiram
- Ammapattinam
- Andanoor
- Arasanagaripattinam
- Arasarkulam Keelpathi
- Arasarkulam Thenpathi
- Arasarkulam Vadapathy
- Aravampatti
- Ariyanipatti
- Ariyur
- Athangaraividuthi
- Athani
- Atthippallam
- Avanathankottai
- Ayingudi
- Ayinkudi
- Alangudi

== C ==
- Chettiyapatti

== E ==
- Edaiyar
- Edayapatti
- Eganivayal
- Egaperumagalur
- Embal
- Ennai
- Eraposal
- Erumbali
- Erundirapatti
- Eswarankoil

== G ==
- Gandarvakottai

== I ==
- Irrumbaanadu

== K ==
- K.chettypatti
- K.rayavaram
- Kadayakudi
- Kalabam
- Kalikulanvayal
- Kallakottai
- Kallur
- Kammakadu
- Kannankarangudi
- Karamangalam
- Karur, Pudukkottai
- Kathavampatty
- Kattakudi
- Kattunaval
- Kavadukudi
- Keelachery
- Keelakuruchi
- Keelapanaiyur
- Keelathaniyam
- Keelkudivattadur
- Keezha pullanviduthi
- Keezhappatti
- Kilakudiammanjakki
- Killukudy
- Kodivayal
- Kodumbalur
- Kollanvayal
- Komapuram
- Kongudi
- Kothadaramapuram
- Kothirapatti
- Kudumiyanmalai
- Kulathur, Gandharvakottai
- Kulattur, Aranthangi
- Kulattur, Avudayarkoil
- Kulipirai
- Kummankudi
- Kundagavayal
- Kunnur
- Kurumpoondi
- Kurungalore

== M ==
- Madagam
- Manamelkudi
- Manavelampatti
- Mangalanadu
- Mangudi, Annavasal
- Mangudi, Aranthangi
- Mannakudi
- Maramadakki
- Maravanpatti
- Mathiyanallur
- Meivazhi Salai
- Melamelnilai
- Melapattu
- Melmangalam
- Melnilaivayal
- Melur
- Merpanaikadu
- Mimisal
- Mirattunilai
- Mookudi
- Mukkanamalaipatty
- Munasandai
- Muthukadu

== N ==
- Nachandupatti
- Nagudi
- Nallambalsamuthitram
- Narpavalakudi
- Narthamalai
- Nattampatti
- Nattumangalam
- Nedungudi
- Neduvasal
- Nevathali

== O ==
- Okkur
- Onangudi
- Oorvani

== P ==
- Palavarasan
- Panampatti
- Panayapatti
- Panchathi
- Pandikkudi
- Pandipathiram
- Parambur
- Periyaloor
- Periyalur
- Perugadu
- Perumanadu
- Perunavalur
- Perungudi
- Piliyavayal
- Pinnangudi
- Ponpethi
- Poovalur
- Poovathakudi
- Pudunilaivayal
- Pudur
- Pullanviduthi
- Pulvayal
- Punginipatti
- Pungudi
- Punniyavayal
- Puthambur

== R ==
- Rajendrapuram
- Ramasamypuram
- Regunathapuram
- Rethinakottai

== S ==
- Sathivayal
- Sathiyamangalam
- Sattiyakudi
- Senganam
- Sengeerai
- Seriyaloor
- Silattur
- Sirumarudur
- Sithanavasal
- Sittankadu
- Subramaniyapuram
- Sunaiyakadu
- Sundampatti

== T ==
- Thachampatti
- Thalanur
- Thalinji
- Thanthani
- Theeyadur
- Theeyur
- Thekkattur
- Thenipatti
- Thennambadi
- Thirukkalambur
- Thirunallur, Annavasal, Pudukkottai
- Thirunallur, Aranthangi, Pudukkottai
- Thirupperundurai
- Thiruppunavasal
- Thiruvakkudi
- Thiruvengaivasal
- Thodaiyur
- Tholuvankadu
- Thondamandendal
- Thunjanur
- Thuraiyur, Pudukkottai

== V ==
- Vaadikkadu
- Vadakadu
- Valaramanikam
- Vallavari
- Vanniyampatti
- Vanniyan Viduthy
- Vavvaneri
- Vayalogam
- Veeramangalam
- Veerapatty
- Vegupatti
- Velivayal
- Vellanjar
- Vellanur
- Velvarai
- Vembakudi East
- Vembakudi West
- Vennvalkudi
- Vettanur
- Vettivayal
- Vettukadu
- Vijayapuram
- Vilanur
- Vilathupatti
- Virachilai
