= Aranthangi block =

Aranthangi block is a Revenue block in Pudukkottai district, Tamil Nadu, India. It has a total of 53 panchayat villages.

== Villages ==
- Alapiranthan
- Aliyanilai
- Amanji
- Amarasimendrapuram
- Arasarkulam Keelpathi
- Arasarkulam Thenpathi
- Arasarkulam Vadapathy
- Athani, Pudukkottai
- Avanathankottai, Pudukkottai
- Ayinkudi
- Edaiyar
- Eganivayal
- Egaperumagalur
- Kammakadu
- Kilakudiammanjakki
- Kodivayal
- Kongudi
- Kulattur, Aranthangi, Pudukkottai
- Kurumbur
- Mangalanadu
- Mangudi, Aranthangi, Pudukkottai
- Mannakudi
- Maramadakki
- Melapattu
- Melmangalam
- Merpanaikadu
- Mookudi
- Nayakkarpatti
- Nagudi
- Narpavalakudi
- Nattumangalam
- Nevathali
- Oorvani
- Panchathi
- Paravakottai
- Periyaloor
- Perugadu
- Poovathakudi
- Rajendrapuram
- Ramasamypuram
- Rethinakottai
- Silattur
- Sittankadu
- Subramaniyapuram, Pudukkottai
- Sunaiyakadu
- Thanthani
- Thirunallur, Aranthangi, Pudukkottai
- Tholuvankadu
- Vallavari
- Vembakudi East
- Vembakudi West
- Vettivayal
- Vijayapuram, Pudukkottai

== See also ==
- Vaadikkadu, Pudukkottai
