= Kulathur =

Kulathur, Kulathoor, or Kulattur may refer to several places in India:

== Kerala ==
- Kulathoor, Thiruvananthapuram, a village in the municipality of Neyyattinkara, Thiruvananthapuram district
- Kulathoor, Trivandrum, a suburb of Thiruvananthapuram city, neighbouring Manvila
- Kulathur, Pathanamthitta, near Kottangal

== Tamil Nadu ==
- Kulathur taluk in Pudukkottai district
- Kulathur, Gandharvakottai, Pudukkottai
- Kulattur, Aranthangi, Pudukkottai
- Kulattur, Avudayarkoil, Pudukkottai
