= Thirumayam block =

Thirumayam block is a revenue block in Pudukkottai district, Tamil Nadu, India. It has a total of 33 panchayat villages.

== Villages of Thirumayam block ==
1. Adhanoor
2. Aranginapatti
3. Arasampatti
4. Athoor, Pudukkottai
5. Ilanjavur
6. K.pallivasal
7. Kannanur
8. Konapet
9. Kottaiyur, Pudukkottai
10. Kottur, Pudukkottai
11. Kulamangalam, Pudukkottai
12. Kulipirai
13. Kuruvikondanpatti
14. Lembalakuudi
15. Melapanaiyur
16. Melur, Pudukkottai
17. Mithilaipatti
18. Nachandupatti
19. Neikonam
20. Neivasal
21. Oonaiyur
22. P.azhagapuri
23. Pillamanganlam
24. Panaiyapatti
25. Peraiyur, Pudukkottai
26. Pilivalam
27. Rangiyam, Pudukkottai
28. Rarapuram
29. Sethurapatti
30. Thirumayam
31. Thulaiyanur
32. V.lakshmipuram
33. Vengalur
34. Viratchilai
