= Gandharvakottai block =

Gandharvakottai block is a revenue block in Pudukkottai district, Tamil Nadu, India. It has a total of 36 panchayat villages.

== Villages of Gandharvakottai block ==
- Akkachipatti
- Andanoor
- Aravampatti
- Ariyanipatti
- Athangaraividuthi
- Gandarvakottai
- Kallakottai
- Kattunaval
- Komapuram
- Kulathur
- Kurumpoondi
- Manganur
- Manjapettai
- Mattangal
- Mudhukulam
- Nadupatti
- Nambooranpatti
- Nathamadipatti
- Neppugai
- Nodiyur
- Palaiya Gandarvakottai
- Pallavarayanpatti
- Periyakottai
- Pisanathur
- Pudunagar
- Pudupatti, Pudukkottai
- Punalkulam
- Sangamviduthi
- Sundampatti
- Thatchankurichi
- Thurusupatti
- Thuvar
- Vadugapatti
- Veeradipatti
- Velalaviduthi
- Viralipatti
