= Ambuliyar River =

- Drainage basin of the river and its tributaries

- Location of the mouth in Tamil Nadu Ambuliyar River (India)

Location
- Country: India
- State: Tamil Nadu
- Districts: Pudukkottai, Thanjavur
- Taluks: Alangudi, Peravurani

Physical characteristics
- Source: Unnamed retention basin
  - location: Alangudi taluk, Pudukkottai District
  - coordinates: 10°21′02.8″N 79°00′42.8″E
  - elevation: 60 m (200 ft)
- Mouth: Palk Strait
  - location: Peravurani taluk, Thanjavur District
  - coordinates: 10°13′05″N 79°16′49.6″E
  - elevation: 0 m (0 ft)
- Length: 48 km (30 mi)
- Basin size: 702.58 km^{2} (271.27 sq mi)
- Discharge
  - location: Palk Strait
  - average: 63,800,000 m^{3}/a (2.25×10^{9} ft^{3}/a)

Basin features
- Population: 307,000
- Tributaries
  - left: Punakkutiyar River
  - right: Maruthankudiyar River

The Ambuliyar or Ambuli River is a non-perennial river in the Pudukkottai and Thanjavur districts of Tamil Nadu, India, that flows southeast into the Palk Strait.

== Course ==
The Ambuliyar begins as the outflow of a retention basin east of the town of Alangudi in the Alangudi taluk of Pudukkottai district. From its source the river flows southeast, passing the towns of Vadakadu and Keeramangalam. South of Peravurani, the Ambuliyar is joined on its right bank by the Maruthankudiyar River, its largest tributary, which flows into the Ambuliyar from the west. Almost immediately past this confluence, the Ambuliyar is joined on its left bank by the Punakkuttiyar River, which flows into it from the north. After this confluence, the Ambuliyar flows east until it empties into the Palk Strait south of Kodivayal, forming a small estuary in the Peravurani taluk of Thanjavur district. The river runs for a total length of 48 kilometres (30 mi).

=== Tributaries ===
The three main tributaries of the Ambuliyar are the Maruthankudiyar, Punakkuttiyar, and Vellunniyar rivers, which originate in the southwest, northeast, and west of the watershed of the Ambuliyar, respectively. The Vellunniyar joins the Maruthankudiyar at Ramasamypuram, west of where the Maruthankudiyar joins the Ambuliyar.

== Basin ==
The drainage basin of the Ambuliyar is located roughly between the lines of longitude of 79° 0′ E and 79° 10′ E, and the lines of latitude of 10° 10′ N and 10° 20′ N, and covers 702.58 square kilometres (271.27 sq mi) of land in the Pudukkottai and Thanjavur districts of Tamil Nadu. The basin is bordered by the basin of the Vellar River to the south and west, the basin of the Agniyar River to the north, and the Palk Strait to the east. In 2001, about 307,000 people inhabited the basin, in which the largest settlement is Alangudi, which had a population of 12,367 people in 2011.

=== Geology ===
Alluvium and pebbly sandstone, along with sand near the coast, are the prominent geological deposits in the river basin. Denudational and fluvial landforms such as pediments, floodplain, and channel fill make up the majority of the central region of the basin. There is tertiary upland and cretaceous lowland in the northwestern part of the basin, and paleotidal flats in the southeastern coastal area. Most of the land in the basin is either barren or used for agriculture. The predominant soil types in the basin are alfisols and vertisols.

== Flow and irrigation ==
Mean annual rainfall in the watershed is 776 millimetres (30.6 in), with a recorded minimum of 156 millimetres (6.1 in) and recorded maximum of 1,108 millimetres (43.6 in). The large majority of this rainfall occurs during the wet season, between June and December. Precipitation levels during the dry season, which typically lasts between January and May, are greatly reduced. Because the reduced level of rainfall usually cannot match heavy irrigative demand, the river does not normally reach the sea during the first half of the year.

6 anicuts cross the river and divert water to 2534 storage tanks and retention basins, and also to numerous irrigation canals and ditches. Water from the Ambuliyar and its tributaries is used to irrigate 469.3 square kilometres (181.2 sq mi) of land, mostly for agriculture. However, despite this heavy demand and lack of flow during the dry season, a five-year study recorded an average discharge at the mouth of the river of 63,800,000 cubic metres (2.25×10^{9} ft^{3}) of water per year. This could be partly due to supplemental flow from the Kaveri River via the Grand Anicut canal, which stretches from the eastern end of Srirangam Island to where it intersects the course of the Vellar River. Besides meeting the Ambuliyar at two points, the canal also intersects its Vellunniyar and Maruthankudiyar tributaries, along with the nearby Agniyar and Maharajasamundram Rivers.
