= Kallur, Pudukkottai =

Village in India

Kallur
- Location in Tamil Nadu, India
- Coordinates: 10.150347°N 78.85242°E
- Country: India
- State: Tamil Nadu
- District: Pudukkottai

Government
  - Type: Panchayt(Local government)-
- Elevation: 97 m (318 ft)

Population (2015)
  - Total: 3,000 to 5,000

Languages
  - Official: Tamil
- Time zone: UTC+5:30 (IST)
- Postal PIN CODE: 622209
- Area code: 04371

Kallur is a village in the Arimalamrevenue block of Pudukkottai district, Tamil Nadu, India. Kallur is one of the village located on Aranthangi-Karaikudi SH-29 Highway Road that comes under Thirumayam Taluk, Pudukottai District.

Approximately every 30 minutes, buses are available to Karaikudi, Aranthangi and Pattukottai.

Nearby locations include Karaikudi, Chettinadu, Kanadukathan and Aranthangi.
