= Samuthiram, Pudukkottai =

Village in India

Samuthiram
- village
- Country: India
- State: Tamil Nadu
- District: Pudukkottai

Population (2001)
  - Total: 1,160

Languages
  - Official: Tamil
- Time zone: UTC+5:30 (IST)

Samuthiram is a village in the Arimalamrevenue block of Pudukkottai district, Tamil Nadu, India.

== Demographics ==
As of 2001 census, Samuthiram had a total population of 1160 with 516 males and 644 females. Out of the total population 735 people were literate.
