= Veeramakaliamman Temple, Perambur =

Temple in Perambur, Tamil Nadu, India

Veeramakaliamman Temple is situated at Perambur in Kulathur taluk of Pudukkottai district in Tamil Nadu, India.

== Location ==
This temple is located at Pudukottai-Sengipatti road, at a distance of 26 km. from Pudukottai.

== Presiding deity ==
The Veeramakaliamman is the presiding deity.

== Specialities ==
The temple is found in an open space. So many devotees from Thanjavur and Trichy districts come to this temple to have the darshan of the deity. In order to fulfil their vows they come over here and offer their offerings here. Goats are sacrificed and a festival in connection with this sacrifice is held every year. At that time large number goats are offered to the deity. Just before the offering people from Gandharvakottai and nearby areas came and halt here. After their offerings, the family members in groups cook the non vegetarian food and ate them in the temple campus.

== Festivals ==
During the Tamil month of Chithirai one day festival and during the Tamil month of Vaikasi three day festival are held in a grand manner in this temple. During the last Fridays of the Tamil month of Aadi special pujas are conducted.

== Worship time ==
The temple is opened for worship from 6.00 a.m. to 7.30 p.m.
