= Komapuram =

Village in India

- Village
- Country: India
- State: Tamil Nadu
- District: Pudukkottai
- Revenue block: Gandarvakottai

Population (2001)
  - Total: 2,043

Languages
  - Official: Tamil
- Time zone: UTC+5:30 (IST)

Komapuram is a village in the Gandaravakottai revenue block in Pudukkottai district, Tamil Nadu, India.

== Demographics ==
As per the 2001 census, Komapuram had a total population of 2043 with 1064 males and 979 females. Out of the total population 1100 people were literate.
