= Thenipatti =

Thenipatti Thenipatti
- Pre Town
- Nickname: K.Puduppatti
- Location in Tamil Nadu, India Thenipatti (India)
- Coordinates: 10.17429°N 78.90908°E
- Country: India
- State: Tamil Nadu
- District: Pudukkottai

Government
  - Type: Tamil Nadu

Population
  - Total: Around 2,000

Languages
  - Official: Tamil
- Time zone: UTC+5:30 (IST)
- Postal code: 622202
- Vehicle registration: TN-55

Thenipatti is a small town in Tamil Nadu, India. It falls under the jurisdiction of the T. Pudupatti police station of the Thirumayam taluka. Thenipatti is called Kilanilai for Government registers two panchayat office is formed and services Kalikulanvayal and Karamangalam. It has a petrol bunk.
