= Arimalam block =

Arimalam block is a Revenue block in Pudukkottai district, Tamil Nadu, India. It has a total of 32 panchayat villages.

== Villages of Arimalam block ==
1. Ayingudi
2. Embal
3. Irrumbaanadu
4. K.chettypatti
5. K.rayavaram
6. Kadayakudi
7. Kadiyapatti
8. Kalikulanvayal
9. Kallur, Pudukkottai
10. Kannankarangudi
11. Karamangalam
12. Keelapanaiyur
13. Kummankudi
14. Kurungalore
15. Madagam
16. Melnilaivayal
17. Mirattunilai
18. Munasandai
19. Nallambalsamuthitram
20. Nedungudi
21. Onangudi
22. Perungudi, Pudukkottai
23. Piliyavayal
24. Pudunilaivayal
25. Samuthiram, Pudukkottai
26. Sengeerai
27. Thekkattur
28. Thiruvakkudi
29. Thuraiyur, Pudukkottai
30. Valaramanikam
31. Vanniyampatti
