= Vanniyan Viduthy =

Vanniyan viduthy
- Village
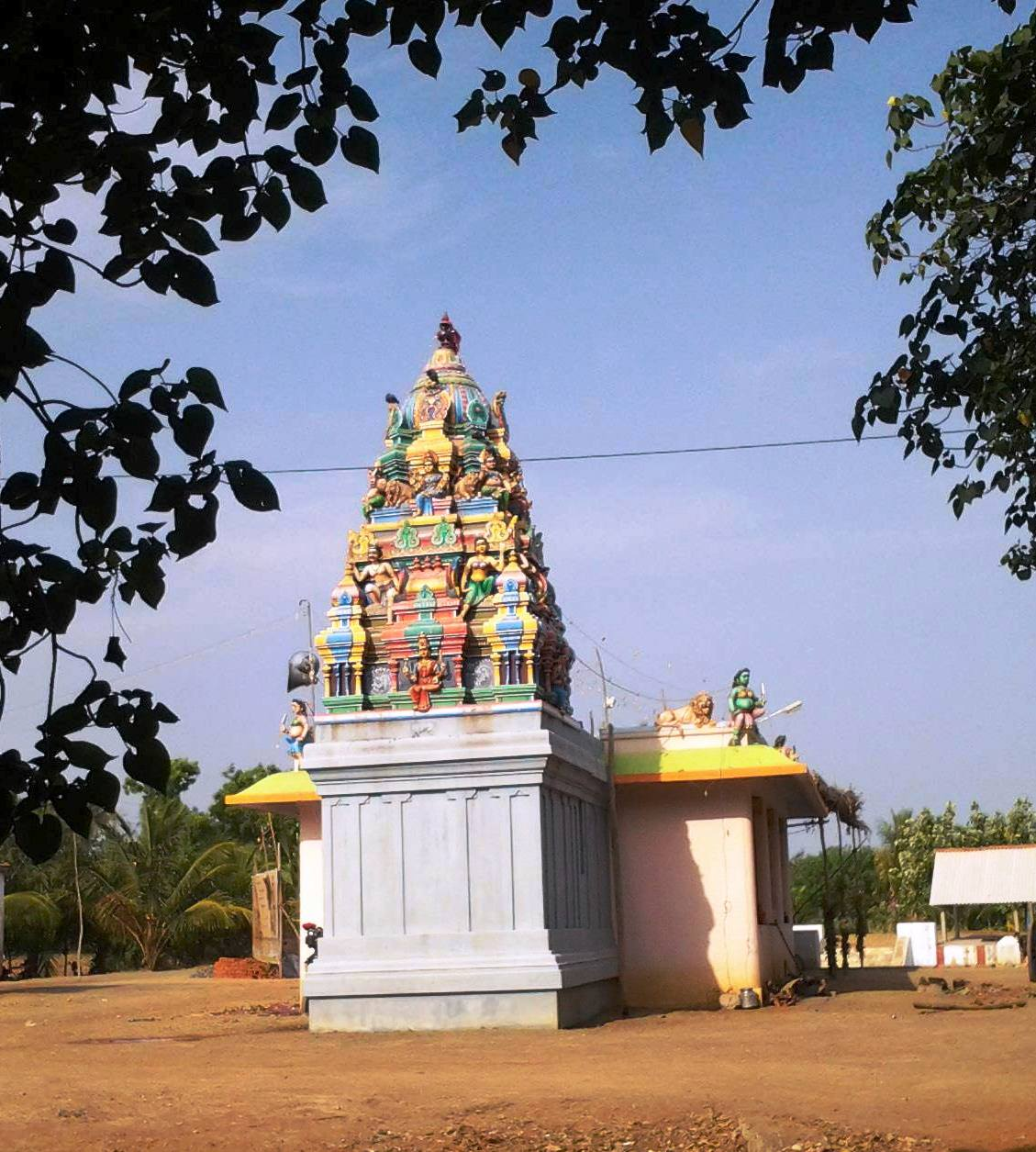
- Temple of Vanniyan viduthy

- Location in Tamil Nadu, India
- Coordinates: 10.172636°N 79.03595°E
- Country: India
- State: Tamil Nadu
- District: Pudukkottai
- Taluk: Alangudi

Government
  - Type: Village Panchayat
  - Body: Village Panchayat Board

Area
  - Total: 4.5 km^{2} (1.7 sq mi)
- Elevation: 35 m (115 ft)

Population (1856)
  - Total: 2,502
  - Density: 560/km^{2} (1,400/sq mi)

Languages
  - Official: Tamil
- Time zone: UTC+5:30 (IST)
- PIN: 614622
- Telephone code: 04322

Vanniyan Viduthy is a village located in the Pudukkottai District of South Tamil Nadu, India and Vanniyan Viduthy village is part of Arayappatti Panchayat (Village Panchayat) . The village is located 07–10 km from Alangudi, Vadakadu, Silattur and Avanathankottai.

== Geography ==
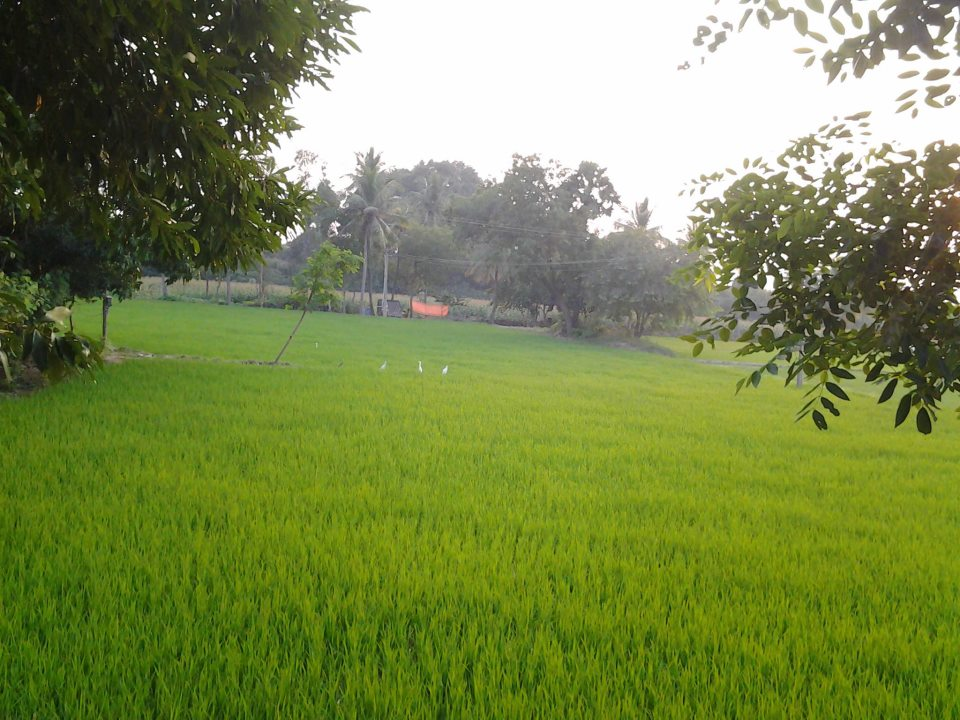
Agriculture is the main occupation of the people in Vanniyan viduthy village

The village Vanniyan viduthy lies in 10.172636 deg. at north in latitude and 79.03595 deg east in longitude and lies 79 M above Mean Sea Level. Maramadakki Village, Kothamangalam Village, Alangadu Village, Arayappatti, Paravakkottai Village are surrounding borders anti-clockwise respectively.

== Demographics ==
As per the 2002 census, Vanniyan viduthy had a total population of 2502 with 1455 males and 1047 females. Out of the total population 1708 people were literate.

== Economy ==
Agriculture is the main activity in the village. Major crops are sugar cane, bananas, green chilies, ground nut, vegetables and coconut.

== Transport ==
Vanniyan viduthy is connected by road from Alangudi to Aranthangi. Nearby towns are Aranthangi (22 km), Alangudi (8 km), Pudukkottai (28 km) and Trichy (88 km). Public buses are the main transport facility for the public. The direct bus service is available from Aranthangi, Alangudi, Pudukkottai, and Trichy. Railway stations are nearby in Aranthangi and Pudukkottai. There is an International Airport in Trichirapalli (Trichy).

== Climate ==
The minimum temperature of this town is 27.1 °C and the maximum temperature is 46.4 °C. The seasonal climate conditions are moderate and the weather is uniformly salubrious. The town gets major rainfall during the North east monsoon period. The Annual normal rainfall varies from 300 mm to 800 mm.
