= Merpanaikadu =

Village in India

- village
- Country: India
- State: Tamil Nadu
- District: Pudukkottai

Population (2001)
  - Total: 6,732

Languages
  - Official: Tamil
- Time zone: UTC+5:30 (IST)

Merpanaikadu is a village in the Aranthangirevenue block of Pudukkottai district, Tamil Nadu, India.

== Demographics ==
As per the 2001 census, Merpanaikadu had a total population of 6732 with 3267 males and 3465 females. Out of the total population 4328 people were literate.
