= Edaiyar =

Village in India

- village
- Country: India
- State: Tamil Nadu
- District: Pudukkottai

Population (2001)
  - Total: 569

Languages
  - Official: Tamil
- Time zone: UTC+5:30 (IST)

Edaiyar is a village in the Aranthangirevenue block of Pudukkottai district, Tamil Nadu, India.

== Demographics ==
As per the 2001 census, Edaiyar had a total population of 569 with 289 males and 280 females. Out of the total population 381 people were literate.

== Economy ==
The local economy is primarily agrarian. Most residents engage in farming and agricultural labor, with crops such as paddy, groundnut, and pulses being commonly cultivated. Some villagers are also involved in cattle rearing and seasonal work in nearby towns.

== Education ==
Edaiyar has access to basic educational facilities through a government-run primary school. For higher education, students typically travel to nearby towns such as Aranthangi or Pudukkottai.

== Transport ==
The village is connected by local roads to Aranthangi, which serves as the nearest major town and administrative center. Public and private buses are the main mode of transport for villagers.

== Culture ==
Edaiyar celebrates traditional Tamil festivals such as Pongal, Deepavali, and Tamil New Year. The village has one or more small temples that serve as centers for religious and community activities.
