= Rethinakottai =

Village in India

- village
- Country: India
- State: Tamil Nadu
- District: Pudukkottai

Population (2001)
  - Total: 2,583

Languages
  - Official: Tamil
- Time zone: UTC+5:30 (IST)

Rethinakottai is a village in the Aranthangirevenue block of Pudukkottai district, Tamil Nadu, India.

== Demographics ==
As per the 2001 census, Rethinakottai had a total population of 2583 with 1238 males and 1345 females. Out of the total population 1719 people were literate.
