= Aliyanilai =

Village in India

Coordinates: 10°12′N 78°59′E

- village
- Interactive map of Aliyanilai
- Country: India
- State: Tamil Nadu
- District: Pudukkottai

Population (2001)
  - Total: 3,485

Languages
  - Official: Tamil
- Time zone: UTC+5:30 (IST)

Azhiyanilai is a village in the Aranthangi revenue block of Pudukkottai district, Tamil Nadu, India.

== Demographics ==
As per the 2001 census, Aliyanilai had a total population of 3485 with 1713 males and 1772 females. Out of the total population, 2072 people were literate.
