= Kathalivanesvarar Temple, Thirukkalambur =

Shiva temple in Tamil Nadu, India

Kathalivanesvarar Temple is a Hindu temple dedicated to the deity Shiva, located at Thirukkalambur of Pudukkottai district in Tamil Nadu, India.

== Location ==
This temple is located at a distance of 55 km from in Pudukkottai-Ponnamaravathi road.

== Name of the place ==
This place is known as Thirukkalambur and Thirukkulambur. Once when a Pandya king came through this place on horse, on a particular place blood came out from the land. The place was dug and a Linga was found. On seeing it, the king constructed a temple on that particular spot. So, this place is known as Thirukkulambur. In the prakara of the temple 'kathali' type of banana trees are found in large numbers. Nobody would eat them. They are meant for doing abisega to the deity. Though this banana is taken and planted in any other place it would not grow up. As 'Kathali' refers to banana, and many number of such banana trees are found the deity is known as Kathalivanesvarar.

== Presiding deity ==
The presiding deity is known as Kathalivanesvarar and the goddess is known as Kamatchi Amman. On the Linga the imprints of foot of the horse are found. As the deity wipe out all the diseases of the devotees, he is also known as Vaitheesvarar and the goddess as Vaitheesvari.

== Sundaresvarar shrine ==
Pandya kings used to construct a separate shrine for Sundaresvarar or Chokkanathar, Shiva, and Meenakshi. In the prakara there is a shrine for them.

== Festivals ==
During the Tamil New Year day, taking of milk pot by devotees, is conducted. Aadi Perukku is also held in this temple. Other festivals such as Vaikasi visakam for 10 days, Chithirai festival, Navaratri and Thaipusam are also held here.

== Worshipping time ==
Pujas are held six times daily at Thiruvananthal (6.00 a.m.), Siru Kalasanthi (7.00 a.m.), Kalasanthi (9.00 a.m.), Uttchikkalam (noon 12.00), Sayaratchai (6.00 p.m.) and Arthajamam (8.00 p.m.). The temple is opened for worship from 6.00 to 12.00 noon and 4.30 to 8.30 p.m.
