= Kummankudi =

Village in India

- village
- Country: India
- State: Tamil Nadu
- District: Pudukkottai

Population (2001)
  - Total: 3,863

Languages
  - Official: Tamil
- Time zone: UTC+5:30 (IST)

Kummankudi is a village in the Arimalam revenue block of Pudukkottai district, Tamil Nadu, India.

== Demographics ==
As per the 2001 census, Kummankudi had a total population of 3863 with 1841 males and 2022 females. Out of the total population 1862 people were literate.
