= Akkachipatti =

Village in India

- Village
- Country: India
- State: Tamil Nadu
- District: Pudukkottai District
- Block: Gandharvakottai block
- Time zone: UTC+05:30 (IST)

Akkachipatti is a village in the Gandaravakottai revenue block of Pudukkottai district, Tamil Nadu, India.

The area of Akkachipatti is linked with Wigan, UK, and they have enjoyed a prosperous relationship since 09/07/2012.
