= Melnilaivayal =

Village in India

- village
- Country: India
- State: Tamil Nadu
- District: Pudukkottai

Population (2001)
  - Total: 2,290

Languages
  - Official: Tamil
- Time zone: UTC+5:30 (IST)

Melnilaivayal is a village in the Arimalamrevenue block of Pudukkottai district, Tamil Nadu, India.

== Demographics ==
As per the 2001 census, Melnilaivayal had a total population of 2290 with 1084 males and 1206 females. Out of the total population 1161 people were literate. It is one of the Vallambar and other few community peoples village.

== Temples ==
- Pillaiyar Kovil
- Amman Kovil
- Ayyanar Kovil
