= Vanniyampatti =

- village
- Country: India
- State: Tamil Nadu
- District: Pudukkottai

Languages
  - Official: Tamil
- Time zone: UTC+5:30 (IST)

Vanniyampatti is a village in the Arimalamrevenue block of Pudukkottai district , Tamil Nadu, India.
