= Kulathur taluk =

Kulathur taluk is a taluk of Pudukkottai district of the Indian state of Tamil Nadu. The headquarters of the taluk is the town of Kulathur. It is one of 11 Taluks of Pudukkottai district. There are 73 villages and 1 town in Kulathur Taluk.

== Demographics ==
According to the 2011 census, the taluk of Kulathur had a population of 162,439 with 81,313 males and 81,126 females. There were 998 women for every 1000 men. The taluk had a literacy rate of 66.15. Child population in the age group below 6 was 8,999 Males and 8,699 Females.
