= Maramadakki =

Village in India

- Village
- Nickname: Maravai
- Location in Tamil Nadu, India
- Coordinates: 10.172636°N 79.03595°E
- Country: India
- State: Tamil Nadu
- District: Pudukkottai
- Taluk: Aranthangi

Government
  - Type: Village Panchayat
  - Body: Village Panchayat Board

Area
  - Total: 9.79 km^{2} (3.78 sq mi)
- Elevation: 68 m (223 ft)

Population (2001)
  - Total: 3,563
  - Density: 364/km^{2} (943/sq mi)

Languages
  - Official: Tamil
- Time zone: UTC+5:30 (IST)
- PIN: 614622
- Telephone code: 04371
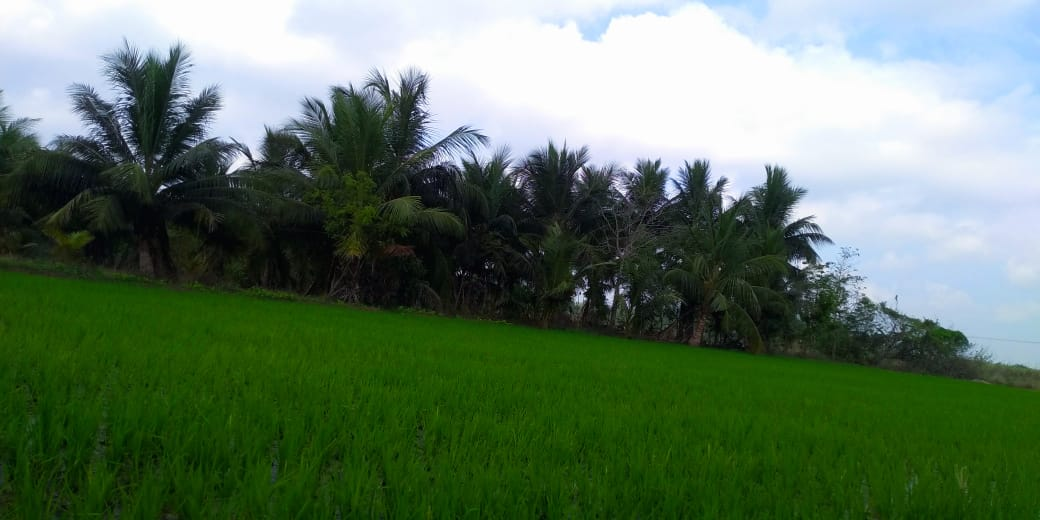
- Paddy field Maramadakki

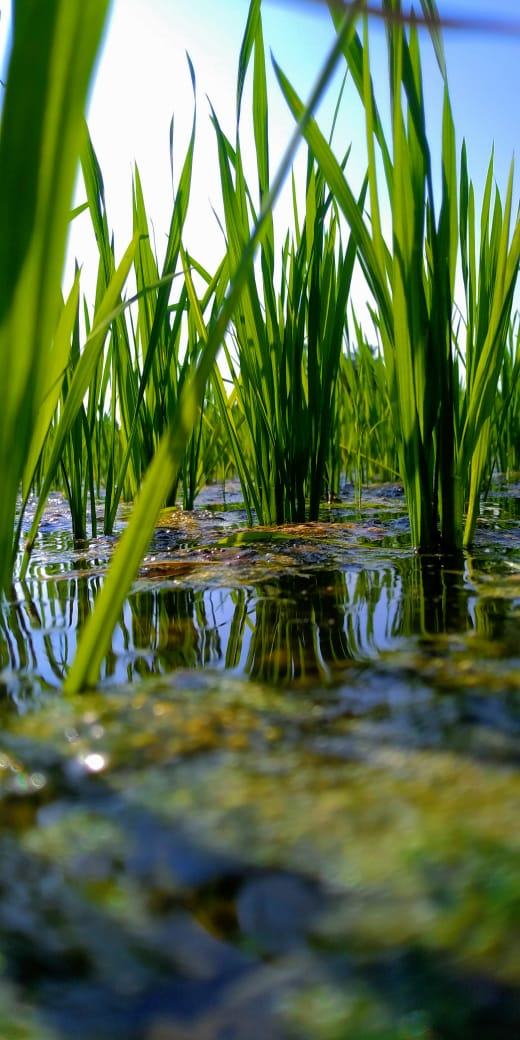
Paddy field Maramadakki

Maramadakki is a village in the Aranthangi revenue block of Pudukkottai district, Tamil Nadu, India.

== Geography ==
The village Maramadakki lies in 10.172636 deg. at north in latitude and 79.03595 deg east in longitude and lies 79 M above Mean Sea Level. A small river "villuni Aaru" border in entire south side. Thirunalur Village, Kothamangalam Village, Alangadu Village, Vanniyanviduthi Village are surrounding borders anti-clockwise respectively. Out of total area of about 9.8 square km, majority of area are agricultural land.

== Economy ==
Agriculture is the main activity in the village. Major crops are sugar cane, bananas, green chiles, ground nut, vegetables and coconut. A weekly market (Vaara Santhai), a major gathering of traders and surrounding villagers, is held on Sundays. The yields are traded on a daily basis at daily commission mundi. Currently, the economy of the village depends on business.

== Transport ==
Maramadakki is well connected by road. Nearby towns are Aranthangi (18 km), Alangudi (12 km), Pudukkottai (30 km) and Trichy (85 km). Public buses are the main transport facility for the public. Direct bus service is available from Aranthangi, Alangudi, Pudukkottai, Vadakadu, and Trichy. Railway stations are nearby in Aranthangi and Pudukkottai. There is an International Airport in Trichirapalli (Trichy).and ECR road 42 km in kattumavadi

== Demographics ==
As per the 2001 census, Maramadakki had a total population of 3563 with 1806 males and 1757 females. Out of the total population 2524 people were literate. The village had an average literacy of 70.84%.

== Climate ==
The minimum temperature of this town is 27.1 °C and the maximum temperature is 46.4 °C. The seasonal climate conditions are moderate and the weather is uniformly salubrious. The town gets major rainfall during the North east monsoon period. The Annual normal rainfall varies from 300 mm to 800 mm.
