= Mirattunilai =

Village in India

- village
- Country: India
- State: Tamil Nadu
- District: Pudukkottai

Population (2001)
  - Total: 4,322

Languages
  - Official: Tamil
- Time zone: UTC+5:30 (IST)

Mirattunilai is a village in the Arimalam revenue block of Pudukkottai district, Tamil Nadu, India.

== Demographics ==
At the 2001 census, Mirattunilai had a total population of 4322 with 2128 males and 2194 females. Out of the total population, 2467 people were literate.
