= Perungudi, Pudukkottai =

Village in India

Perungudi
- village
- Location in Tamil Nadu, India
- Coordinates: 10.299901°N 78.828354°E
- Country: India
- State: Tamil Nadu
- District: Pudukkottai

Population (2001)
  - Total: 5,672

Languages
  - Official: Tamil
- Time zone: UTC+5:30 (IST)

Perungudi is a village in the Arimalamrevenue block of Pudukkottai district, Tamil Nadu, India.

== Demographics ==
As of 2001 census, Perungudi had a total population of 5672 with 2717 males and 2956 females. Out of the total population 3234 people were literate.

Perungudi is one of the villages in Pudukkottai district. The most visited monument in Perungudi is the Vendi vantha amman Temple Perungudi is an important center of South Indian art and architecture. Perungudi is well-connected by roads with other parts of India and with cities and towns in Tamil Nadu. The nearest airport is Tiruchirapalli International Airport located at a distance of 56 kilometres. The nearest seaport is Nagapattinam which is 100 kilometres from Perungudi. The major occupation of the inhabitants of the town is tourism and service-oriented industry, while the traditional occupation is agriculture. Perungudi is known as the "Rice bowl of Pudukkottai". Paddy is the crops and the other crops grown are Blackgram, Banana, Coconut, Gingelly, Sugarcane and Maize. The total percentage of land fit for cultivation is more than 50%. There are two seasons for agriculture in Perungudi - Kuruvai (September to December), Samba (January to April). Hindus form the majority population; the town also has a substantial population of Muslims and Christians. Electricity supply to Perungudi is regulated and distributed by the Tamil Nadu Electricity Board (TNEB). Perungudi falls under the Trichy region of the TNEB. The treated sewage water is pumped into the Pappanpatti Kanmai Water supply to the town and its suburbs is also provided by the Perungudi municipality. Sports played include cricket, volleyball, badminton, and kabaddi. By Sp. Kumaresh Perungudi
