= Mannakudi =

Village in India

- village
- Location within Tamil Nadu Location within India
- Coordinates: 10°10′21″N 79°06′31″E
- Country: India
- State: Tamil Nadu
- District: Pudukkottai

Population (2001)
  - Total: 877

Languages
  - Official: Tamil
- Time zone: UTC+5:30 (IST)

Mannakudi is a village in the Aranthangirevenue block of Pudukkottai district, Tamil Nadu, India.

== Demographics ==
As per the 2001 census, Mannakudi had a total population of 877 with 437 males and 440 females. Out of the total population 595 people were literate.
