= Eganivayal =

Village in India

Santhamanai
- village
- Country: India
- State: Tamil Nadu
- District: Pudukkottai

Population (2001)
  - Total: 1,752

Languages
  - Official: Tamil
- Time zone: UTC+5:30 (IST)

Santhamanai is a village in the Aranthangirevenue block of Pudukkottai district, Tamil Nadu, India.

== Demographics ==
As per the 2001 census, Santhamanai had a total population of 1752 with 879 males and 873 females. Out of the total population 1184 people were literate.
