= Athangaraividuthi =

Village in India

- Village
- Country: India
- State: Tamil Nadu
- District: Pudukkottai District
- Block: Gandharvakottai block

Population (2001)
  - Total: 2,071
- Time zone: UTC+05:30 (IST)

Athangaraividuthi is a village in the Gandaravakottai revenue block of Pudukkottai district, Tamil Nadu, India.

== Demographics ==
As per the 2001 census, Athangaraividuthi had a total population of 2071 with 1071 males and 1000 females. Out of the total population 1054 people were literate.
