= Amanji =

Village in India

- village
- Interactive map of Amanji
- Coordinates: 10.143780°N 79.015040°E
- Country: India
- State: Tamil Nadu
- District: Pudukkottai

Population (2001)
  - Total: 249

Languages
  - Official: Tamil
- Time zone: UTC+5:30 (IST)

Amanji is a village in the Aranthangi revenue block of Pudukkottai district, Tamil Nadu, India.

== Demographics ==
As per the 2001 census, Amanji had a total population of 249 with 116 males and 133 females. Out of the total population 189 people were literate.
