= K.chettypatti =

Village in India

- village
- Country: India
- State: Tamil Nadu
- District: Pudukkottai

Population (2001)
  - Total: 2,148

Languages
  - Official: Tamil
- Time zone: UTC+5:30 (IST)

K.Chettypatti is a village in the Arimalamrevenue block of Pudukkottai district, in Tamil Nadu, India.

== Demographics ==
As per the 2001 census, K.Chettypatti had a total population of 2148 with 1069 males and 1079 females. Out of the total population 1043 people were literate.
