= Vijayapuram, Pudukkottai =

Vijayapuram
- village
- Country: India
- State: Tamil Nadu
- District: Pudukkottai

Population (2001)
  - Total: 1,024

Languages
  - Official: Tamil
- Time zone: UTC+5:30 (IST)

Vijayapuram is a village in the Aranthangi revenue block of Pudukkottai district, Tamil Nadu, India.

== Demographics ==
As of the 2001 census, Vijayapuram had a total population of 2063 with 1024 males and 1039 females. Out of the total population 1393 people were literate.
