= Andanoor =

Village in India

- Village
- Interactive map of Andanoor
- Country: India
- State: Tamil Nadu
- District: Pudukkottai District
- Block: Gandharvakottai block

Population (2001)
  - Total: 2,423
- Time zone: UTC+05:30 (IST)

Andanoor is a village in the Gandaravakottai revenue block of Pudukkottai district, Tamil Nadu, India.

== Demographics ==
As per the 2001 census, Andanoor had a total population of 2423 with 1214 males and 1209 females. Out of the total population 1146 people were literate.
