= Arasarkulam Thenpathi =

Village in India

- village
- Country: India
- State: Tamil Nadu
- District: Pudukkottai

Government
  - Panchayat President: Mrs.Rameesha shahul hameed

Population (2001)
  - Total: 5,233

Languages
  - Official: Tamil
- Time zone: UTC+5:30 (IST)
- Postal code: 614801

Arasarkulam Thenpathi is a village in the Aranthangirevenue block of Pudukkottai district, Tamil Nadu, India.

== Demographics ==
As per the 2001 census, Arasarkulam Thenpathi had a total population of 5233 with 1920 males and 2435 females. Out of the total population 2798 people were literate.
