= Seriyaloor =

Village in India

Seriyaloor is a village in the Alangudi taluk of Pudukkottai district, Tamil Nadu, India. Seriyaloor is 20 km distance from its taluk main city Alangudi. Another city Aranthangi is located in 18 km at south-west side from the village and 444 km distance from its state capital city Chennai. It is an agriculture based village.
