= Ayingudi =

Village in India

- village
- Country: India
- State: Tamil Nadu
- District: Pudukkottai

Government
  - Panchayat President: Nethaji Sundarraju

Population (2001)
  - Total: 526

Languages
  - Official: Tamil
- Time zone: UTC+5:30 (IST)
- Postal code: 614801

Ayingudi is a village in the Arimalamrevenue block of Pudukkottai district, Tamil Nadu, India.

== Demographics ==
As per the 2001 census, Ayingudi had a total population of 855 with 434 males and 421 females. Out of the total population 526 people were literate.
