= Oorvani =

Village in India

- village
- Country: India
- State: Tamil Nadu
- District: Pudukkottai

Population (2001)
  - Total: 344

Languages
  - Official: Tamil
- Time zone: UTC+5:30 (IST)

Oorvani is a village in the Aranthangirevenue block of Pudukkottai district, Tamil Nadu, India.

== Demographics ==
As per the 2001 census, Oorvani had a total population of 344 with 174 males and 170 females. Out of the total population 200 people were literate.
