= Kilakudiammanjakki =

Village in India

- village
- Country: India
- State: Tamil Nadu
- District: Pudukkottai

Population (2001)
  - Total: 51

Languages
  - Official: Tamil
- Time zone: UTC+5:30 (IST)

Kilakudiammanjakki is a village in the Aranthangi revenue block of Pudukkottai district, Tamil Nadu, India.

== Demographics ==
As per the 2001 census, Kilakudiammanjakki had a total population of 51 with 21 males and 30 females. Out of the total population, 36 people were literate.
