= Onangudi =

Village in India

Coordinates: 10°17′N 78°52′E

- village
- Interactive map of Onangudi
- Country: India
- State: Tamil Nadu
- District: Pudukkottai

Languages
  - Official: Tamil
- Time zone: UTC+5:30 (IST)

Onangudi is a village in the Arimalam revenue block of Pudukkottai district , Tamil Nadu, India.
