= Periyalur =

Village in India

- Village
- Location in Tamil Nadu, India Periyalur (India)
- Coordinates: 10.24°N 79.07°E
- Country: India
- State: Tamil Nadu
- Region: Thondaiman
- Taluk: Aranthangi
- District: Pudukkottai

Area
  - Total: 12.58 km^{2} (4.86 sq mi)
- Elevation: 24 m (79 ft)

Population (2011)
  - Total: 1,937
  - Density: 154.0/km^{2} (398.8/sq mi)

Languages
  - Official: Tamil
- Time zone: UTC+5:30 (IST)
- PIN: 614624
- Telephone code: (91) 4371
- Vehicle registration: TN 55
- Website: www.myperiyalur.clan.su

Periyalur is a village in Pudukkottai District in the Indian state of Tamil Nadu. It is populated by approximately one thousand families.

== Education ==
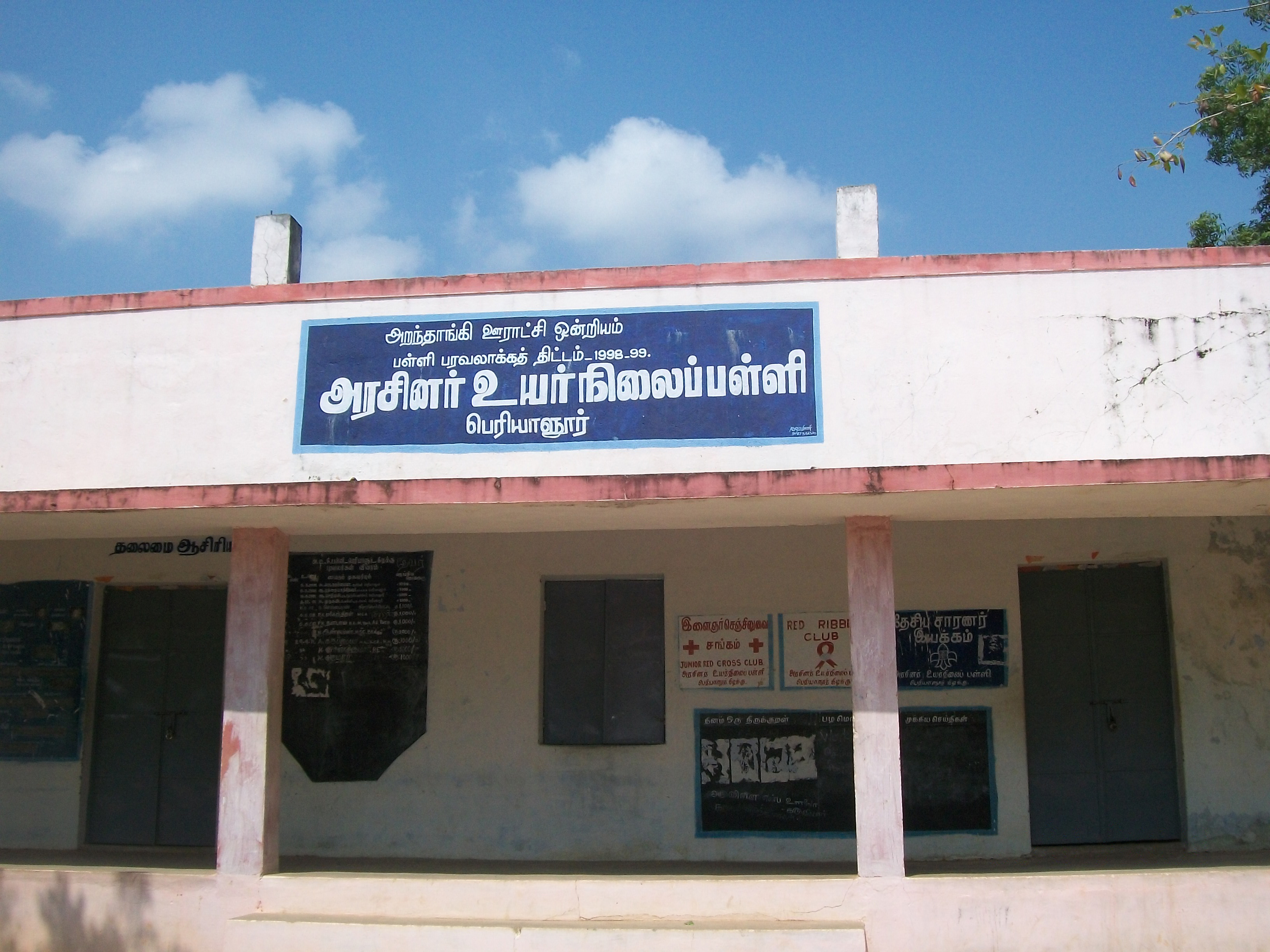
Government high school

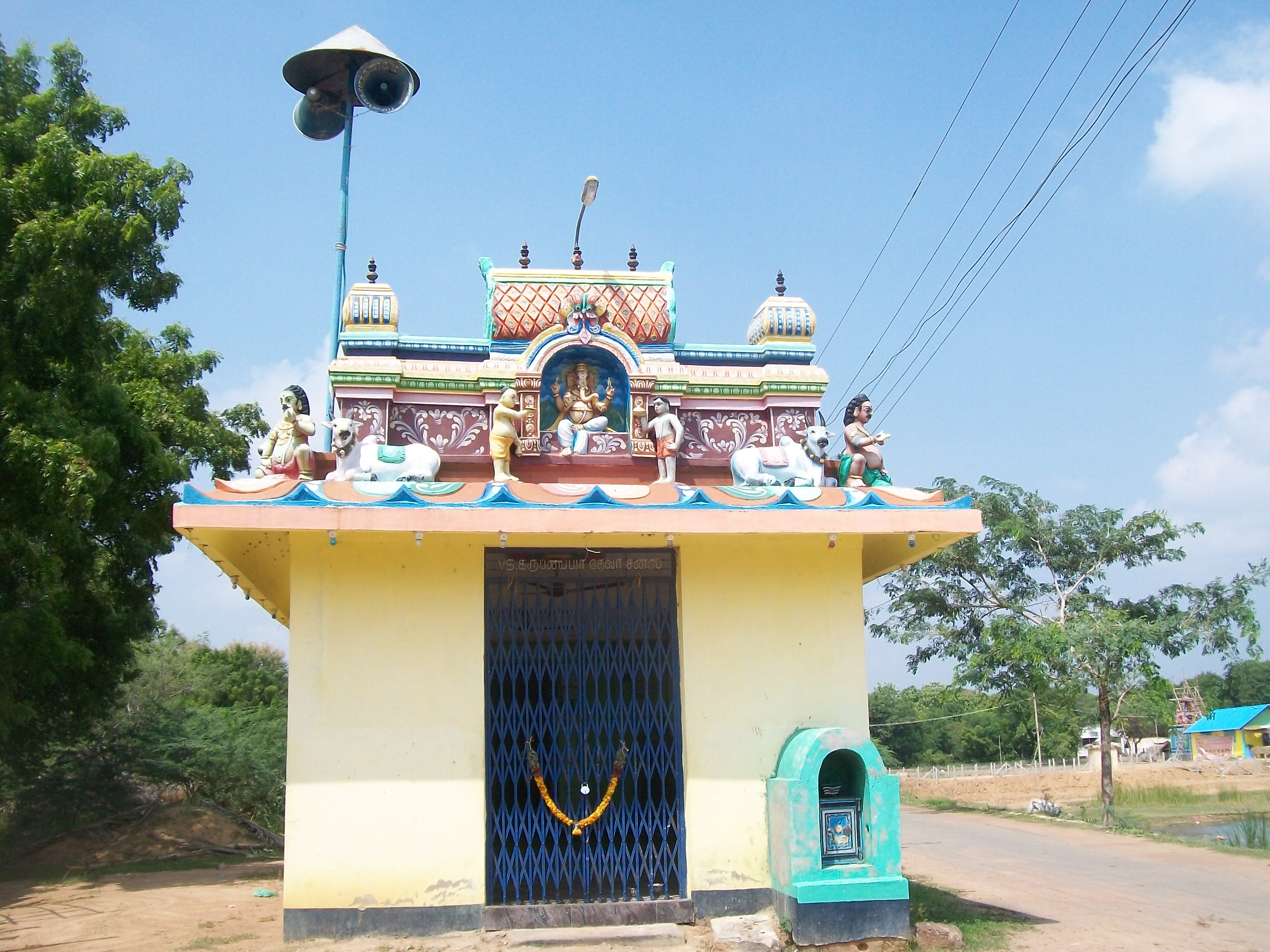
Sri Vinayakar temple

In Aranthangi taluk, Periyalur is the most developed village in terms of education. 90% of the village is well-educated, with one to three members per family educated in Pudukkottai and Trichy. Students of this area are educated in many fields. 30% of Periyalur's students study engineering.

It has 2 schools, one is an elementary school and another one is the high school where students can study up to 10th Standard. The village has an operational post office which is used by the people of periyalur for postal and saving needs.

== Economy ==
The primary occupation is agriculture. The nearby river has helped the village become more economically developed.

== Temples ==
Village temples include the Sri Kaaliyamman temple and the Sri Muthumariyamman temple, the Sri Vinayakar temple, Sri Mutulinga Ayyanar Swamy temple, Sri Karuppar Swamy temple, Sri Veerabathirar Swamy temple, Sri Ayyanar Swamy temple, and the Sri Kaluvathi Amman temple. In every year, during the month of Chithirai, they used to pull a chariot.

== Transport ==
Bus facilities are available. Periyalur is on the route from Aranthangi to pattukkottai
