= Kongudi =

Village in India

Coordinates: 10°12′N 78°56′E

- village
- Interactive map of Kongudi
- Country: India
- State: Tamil Nadu
- District: Pudukkottai

Population (2009)
  - Total: 840

Languages
  - Official: Tamil
- Time zone: UTC+5:30 (IST)
- Postal code: 622202

Kongudi is a village in the Aranthangi revenue block of Pudukkottai district, Tamil Nadu, India.

== Geographics ==
Geographically Kongudi falls about 8 km SW of Aranthangi town and 6 km NE of K.Pudupatti. Communications are far enough to reach the towns. Surrounding villages are connected by a tar road. A major road near the village is Karaikudi-Thanjavur (SH-26). On the SH-26 there is a village called Otthakadai which to Kongudi is about 3 km by tar road. The town bus runs three times daily to and from Aranthangi bus number25 . . The nearest major railways are Pudukottai and Karaikudi. The nearest airport is Tiruchirapalli International Airport.

== Geology ==
Geologically, this village is covered by soil of Quaternary to very recent age, No rock exposure, soil covers like black clay and yellowish brown clayey silt. A major river is Vellaru, a non-perennial river flowing from north of Pudukottai to the Bay of Bengal. It meets the ocean near Meemisal. The Vellaru river is the main source for most of the water along the flowing path. Mainly the villagers are doing agriculture of seasonal paddy crops. So all are dependant on rain, apart from that sand exporting business touched the peak level from vellaru which is flowing North of village.

== Population & Community ==
In total around 500 peoples are currently living in both genders in the village. As per the 2001 census, Kongudi had a total population of 426 with 205 males and 221 females. Out of the total population 259 people were literate.

All belong to the Hindu religion and with some subcaste mainly dominated by Vallam Velallars called Vallambar(belong to 84 nadu). Most of the villagers are illiterate about 60-70%. Mainly the village rolling by Vallambars because they are the one dominated and higher caste than rest. So the ancient Katta-panchayathu still existing in this village with vallambars head(Ambalam). Most of the youngsters are below 35 years of age, residing in foreign countries like Singapore, Malaysiya, Kuwait, and some are in major cities of the state.

There are many temples in this village, such as Rakkammal Koil, Ravuttha Mandar Koil, Subramaniyar Koil, Ayyanar Koil, Mariyamman Koil and Pillayar Koil. There are also local festivals such as Madhu Eduppu, Kuthirai Eduppu, Kidai Vettu, Paniyaram Padaippu and Kavadi Eduppu.

== Notable places ==
A temple named Rakkammal Koil is known for Snake bit where the Ayurvedic medicine is given.

== Village issues ==
The village faces issues with drinking water & employment.
