= Vallavari =

- village
- Country: India
- State: Tamil Nadu
- District: Pudukkottai

Population (2001)
  - Total: 1,605

Languages
  - Official: Tamil
- Time zone: UTC+5:30 (IST)

Vallavari is a village in the Aranthangirevenue block of Pudukkottai district, Tamil Nadu, India.

== Demographics ==
As per the 2001 census, Vallavari had a total population of 1605 with 2088 males and 780 females. Out of the total population 825 people were literate.
