= Kallakottai =

Village in India

Kallakkottai
- Village
- Nickname: kkt
- Country: India
- State: Tamil Nadu
- District: Pudukkottai District
- Block: Gandharvakottai block

Population (2001)
  - Total: 3,894
- Time zone: UTC+05:30 (IST)
- Postal code: 622302
- ISO 3166 code: IN-TN

Kallakkottai is a village in the Gandaravakottai revenue block of Pudukkottai district, Tamil Nadu, India.

== Demographics ==
As per the 2001 census, Kallakottai had a total population of 3894 with 1976 males and 2008 females. Out of the total population 1968 people were literate.
