= Mangudi, Aranthangi, Pudukkottai =

Village in India

Mangudi
- village
- Country: India
- State: Tamil Nadu
- District: Pudukkottai

Population (2001)
  - Total: 1,522

Languages
  - Official: Tamil
- Time zone: UTC+5:30 (IST)

Mangudi is a village in the Aranthangirevenue block of Pudukkottai district, Tamil Nadu, India.

== Demographics ==
As of the 2001 census, Mangudi had a total population of 1522 with 750 males and 772 females. Out of the total population, 957 people were literate.
