= Munasandai =

Village in India

Munasanthai Munasanthai Munasanthai
- village
- Munasanthai
- Country: India
- State: Tamil Nadu
- District: Pudukkottai

Government
  - Panchayat President: Subramaniyan

Area
  - Total: 1 km^{2} (0.39 sq mi)

Population (2022)
  - Total: 1,352
  - Density: 1,400/km^{2} (3,500/sq mi)

Tamil
  - Official: Tamil
- Time zone: UTC+5:30 (IST)
- Postal code: 622506

Munasanthai is a village in the Arimalamrevenue block of Pudukkottai district, Tamil Nadu, India.
