= Subramaniyapuram, Pudukkottai =

Village in India

Subramaniyapuram
- village
- Country: India
- State: Tamil Nadu
- District: Pudukkottai

Population (2001)
  - Total: 968

Languages
  - Official: Tamil
- Time zone: UTC+5:30 (IST)

Subramaniyapuram is a village in the Aranthangirevenue block of Pudukkottai district, Tamil Nadu, India.

== Demographics ==
As of 2001 census, Subramaniyapuram had a total population of 968 with 412 males and 556 females. Out of the total population 710 people were literate.
