= Piliyavayal =

Village in India

- village
- Country: India
- State: Tamil Nadu
- District: Pudukkottai

Population (2001)
  - Total: 1,117

Languages
  - Official: Tamil
- Time zone: UTC+5:30 (IST)

Piliyavayal is a village in the Arimalamrevenue block of Pudukkottai district, Tamil Nadu, India.

== Demographics ==
As per the 2001 census, Piliyavayal had a total population of 1117 with 484 males and 633 females. Out of the total population 563 people were literate.
