= Poovathakudi =

Village in India

- village
- Country: India
- State: Tamil Nadu
- District: Pudukkottai

Population (2001)
  - Total: 2,802

Languages
  - Official: Tamil
- Time zone: UTC+5:30 (IST)

Poovathakudi is a village in the Aranthangirevenue block of Pudukkottai district, Tamil Nadu, India.

== Demographics ==
As per the 2001 census, Poovathakudi had a total population of 2,802 with 1,425 males and 1,377 females. Out of the total population 1,970 people were literate, or 70.3%.
