= Aravampatti =

Village in India

Coordinates: 10°35′N 79°00′E

- Village
- Interactive map of Aravampatti
- Country: India
- State: Tamil Nadu
- District: Pudukkottai District
- Block: Gandharvakottai block

Population (2001)
  - Total: 1,038
- Time zone: UTC+05:30 (IST)

Aravampatti is a village in the Gandharvakottai block revenue block of Pudukkottai district, Tamil Nadu, India.

== Demographics ==
As per the 2001 census, Aravampatti had a total population of 1038 with 529 males and 509 females. Out of the total population 545 people were literate.
