= Kurungalore =

Village in India

- village
- Country: India
- State: Tamil Nadu
- District: Pudukkottai

Population (2001)
  - Total: 1,244

Languages
  - Official: Tamil
- Time zone: UTC+5:30 (IST)

Kurungalore is a village in the Arimalam revenue block of Pudukkottai district , Tamil Nadu, India.(KARAINAGAR)

== Demographics ==
As per the 2001 census,Kurungalore had a total population of 1244 with 578 males and 666 females. Out of the total population, 678 people were literate.
