= Madagam =

Village in India

- village
- Interactive map of Madagam
- Coordinates: 10.067599°N 78.972659°E
- Country: India
- State: Tamil Nadu
- District: Pudukkottai

Government
  - Type: Member of Legislative Assembly
  - Body: Indian National Congress
  - Panchayat President: Mr.S.Tamilselvan திரு. சுப. தமிழ்செல்வன்

Population (2001)
  - Total: 288

Languages
  - Official: Tamil
- Time zone: UTC+5:30 (IST)
- Postal code: 622 204
- Vehicle registration: TN 55

Madagam is a village in the Arimalam revenue block of Pudukkottai district, Tamil Nadu, India.

== Demographics ==
As per the 2001 census, Madagam had a total population of 288 with 138 males and 150 females.
