= Egaperumagalur =

Village in India

- village
- Country: India
- State: Tamil Nadu
- District: Pudukkottai

Population (2001)
  - Total: 865

Languages
  - Official: Tamil
- Time zone: UTC+5:30 (IST)

Egaperumagalur is a village in the Aranthangi revenue block of Pudukkottai district, Tamil Nadu, India.

== Demographics ==
As per the 2001 census, Egaperumagalur had a total population of 865 with 400 males and 465 females. Out of the total population 562 people were literate.
