= Thekkattur =

Village in India

- Village
- Location in Tamil Nadu, India
- Coordinates: 10°17′58″N 78°47′20″E
- Country: India
- State: Tamil Nadu
- District: Pudukkottai

Population (2011)
  - Total: 1,043

Languages
  - Official: Tamil
- Time zone: UTC+5:30 (IST)

Thekkattur is a village in the Arimalam revenue block of Pudukkottai district, Tamil Nadu, India.

== Demographics ==
As per the 2011 census, Thekkattur had a total population of 1,043, with 531 males and 512 females. As of the 2001 census, 66% of the population was literate.
