= Ariyanipatti =

Village in India

- Village
- Country: India
- State: Tamil Nadu
- District: Pudukkottai District
- Block: Gandharvakottai block

Population (2001)
  - Total: 1,563
- Time zone: UTC+05:30 (IST)

Ariyanipatti is a village in the Gandaravakottai revenue block of Pudukkottai district, Tamil Nadu, India.

== Demographics ==
As per the 2001 census, Ariyanipatti had a total population of 1563 with 796 males and 767 females. Out of the total population 879 people were literate.
