= Narpavalakudi =

Village in India

- village
- Country: India
- State: Tamil Nadu
- District: Pudukkottai

Population (2001)
  - Total: 551

Languages
  - Official: Tamil
- Time zone: UTC+5:30 (IST)

Narpavalakudi is a village in the Aranthangirevenue block of Pudukkottai district, Tamil Nadu, India.

== Demographics ==
As per the 2001 census, Narpavalakudi had a total population of 551 with 242 males and 309 females. Out of the total population 299 people were literate.
