= Kattunaval =

Village in India

- Village
- Location within Tamil Nadu Location within India
- Coordinates: 10°30′38″N 78°58′12″E
- Country: India
- State: Tamil Nadu
- District: Pudukkottai District
- Block: Gandharvakottai block
- Time zone: UTC+05:30 (IST)
- ISO 3166 code: IN-TN

Kattunaval is a village in the Gandaravakottai revenue block of Pudukkottai district, Tamil Nadu, India.

== Demographics ==
As per the 2001 census, Kattunaval had a total population of 2790 with 1390 males and 1400 females. Out of the total population 1673 people were literate.
