= Kurumpoondi =

Village in India

- Village
- Country: India
- State: Tamil Nadu
- District: Pudukkottai District
- Block: Gandharvakottai block

Population (2001)
  - Total: 1,363
- Time zone: UTC+05:30 (IST)

Kurumpoondi is a village in the Gandaravakottai revenue block of Pudukkottai district, Tamil Nadu, India.

== Demographics ==
As per the 2001 census, Kurumpoondi had a total population of 1363 with 690 males and 673 females. Out of the total population 817 people were literate.
