= Valaramanikam =

- village
- Country: India
- State: Tamil Nadu
- District: Pudukkottai

Population (2011)
  - Total: 1,849

Languages
  - Official: Tamil
- Time zone: UTC+5:30 (IST)

Valaramanikam is a village in the Arimalamrevenue block of Pudukkottai district, Tamil Nadu, India.

== Demographics ==
As per the 2011 census, Valaramanikam had a total population of 1849 with 890 males and 959 females.
