= Pudunilaivayal =

Village in India

- village
- Country: India
- State: Tamil Nadu
- District: Pudukkottai

Population (2001)
  - Total: 1,977

Languages
  - Official: Tamil
- Time zone: UTC+5:30 (IST)

Pudunilaivayal is a village in the Arimalamrevenue block of Pudukkottai district, Tamil Nadu, India.

== Demographics ==
As per the 2001 census, Pudunilaivayal had a total population of 1,977 with 917 males and 1,060 females. Out of the total population 1,188 people were literate.
