= Vettivayal =

UOV-University of Vettivayal
- village
- Location in Tamil Nadu, India
- Coordinates: 10.150244°N 79.088197°E
- Country: India
- State: Tamil Nadu
- District: Pudukkottai

Languages
  - Official: Tamil
- Time zone: UTC+5:30 (IST)
- Postal code: 616414

UOV-University of Vettivayal

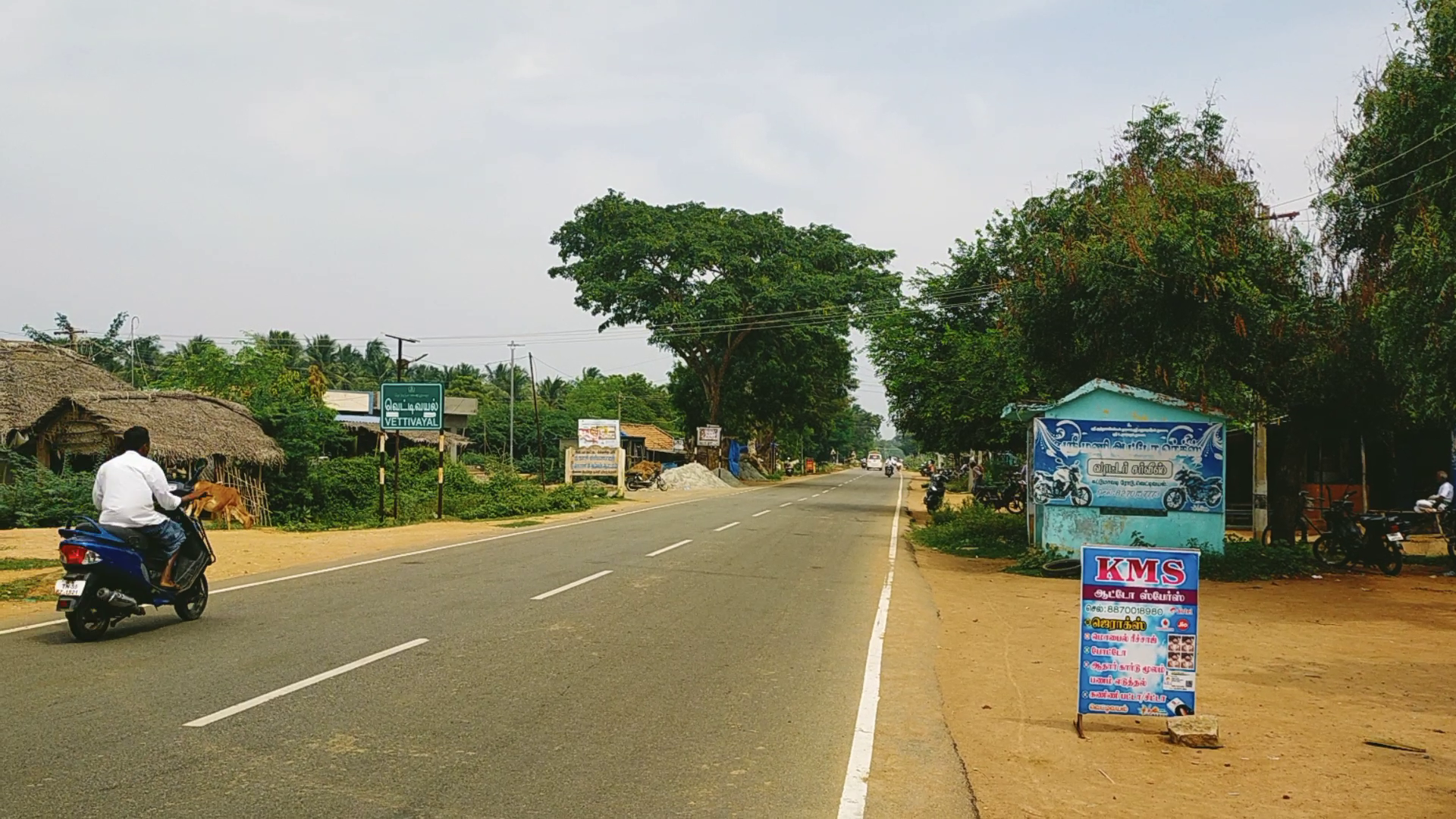
UOV-University of Vettivayal

Vettivayal is a village in the Aranthangi revenue block of Pudukkottai district, Tamil Nadu, India.
