= Rajendrapuram =

Village in India

Rajendrapuram Naina
- Rajendrapuram Panchayat
- Nickname: R.puram
- Location in Tamil Nadu, India
- Coordinates: 10°12′50″N 79°01′30″E
- Country: India
- State: Tamil Nadu
- District: Pudukkottai

Population (2015)
  - Total: 4,860

Languages
  - Official: Tamil
- Time zone: UTC+5:30 (IST)
- Postal code: 614624
- Vehicle registration: TN

Rajendrapuram is a village in the Aranthangi revenue block of Pudukkottai district, Tamil Nadu, India.

== Demographics ==
According to the Indian census of 2015, Rajendrapuram had a total population of 4,860, consisting of 2,840 males and 2,020 females, of whom 3,720 people were literate.

=== Princely state ===
Rajendrapuram became a princely state of British India under the political authority of the Madras Presidency. The state had an area of 4663 sq.m and, in 1901, a population of 380,000. The Rajas of Rajendrapuram were entitled to a 17-gun salute.

=== Post-independence ===
The last Thondaiman raja of Rajendrapuram acceded to newly-independent India in 1948, and the state became a division of Tiruchirappalli District of Madras State. The state was reorganised twice in the succeeding decade, taking its present form in 1956; it was renamed Tamil Nadu in 1968. On 14 January 1974, the present Pudukkottai District was formed from parts of Tiruchirappalli and Thanjavur districts.

== Geography and climate ==
The state consists mainly of an undulating plain, with the land mostly barren; it is interspersed with rocky hills, especially in the southwest. Granite and laterite are quarried, red ochre is worked, and silk and cotton fabrics, bell-metal vessels and perfumes are among the principal manufactures. There is also some export trade in groundnuts and tanning bark, with the tanning bark used in religious rituals due to its unique texture and scent. They live in more Muslim communities.

| | Summer | Winter |
|---|---|---|
| Max. | 38 °C (100 °F) | 34 °C (93 °F) |
| Min. | 21 °C (70 °F) | 18 °C (64 °F) |

== Schools & Colleges near Rajendrapuram ==
Government High School Rajendrapuram

Laurel High School SH 29; Koothadivayal; Tamil Nadu 614616; India 2.5 km distance

Ai - Aman Metric Sec school Rajendrapuram Aranthangi taluk 1.0 km distance

G.h.s.s.silattur silattur 4 km distance

Ai - Aman Teacher Training Institute Address : Rajendrapuram Aranthangi Taluk 1.0 km distance

NAINA MOHAMED ARTS AND SCIENCE COLLEGE (Girl only) SH 29; Tamil Nadu 614616; India 1.0 km distance

M S Polytechnic College Rajendrapuram, Aranthagi Taluk 1.5 km distance

== Mosque & Temples in Rajendrapuram ==
Jumma Masjid& Arabic School Rajendrapuram, Aranthangi T.k Tamil Nadu; India

kulathukarai Pallivasal Rethinakottai Road, Rajendrapuram

Sri Kallaperiyan Rajathi Amman Temple Rajendrapuram, Aranthangi T.k Tamil Nadu; India 0.7 km distance

Sri Muni; Chinnakaruppar;Iyyanar Temple Rajendrapuram, Aranthangi T.k Tamil Nadu; India 0.8 km distance

Sri Kaaliyamman Temple Rajendrapuram, Aranthangi T.k Tamil Nadu; India 0.8 km distance

Sri Karuppayi Amman Temple Rajendrapuram, Aranthangi T.k Tamil Nadu; India 1.5 km distance

Sri Sitthi Vinayagar Temple Rajendrapuram, Aranthangi T.k Tamil Nadu; India 1.7 km distance

== Location ==
Rajendrapuram is located in the Arantangi Block in the Pudukkottai District of Tamil Nadu State, India. It is located 38 km East of the District headquarters, Pudukkottai, 6 km from Arantangi, and 412 km from State capital Chennai

Silattur (4 km), Mangudi (5 km), Rethinakottai (5 km), Aliyanilai (5 km), Nattumangalam (5 km) are the nearby Villages to Rajendrapuram. Rajendrapuram is surrounded by Thiruvarankulam Block to the North, Arimalam Block to the west, Peravurani Block to the East, and Avadaiyarkovil Block to the South.

Peravurani, Pudukkottai, Karaikudi, Pattukkottai are nearby Cities.
