= Mangalanadu =

Village in India

- Country: India
- State: Tamil Nadu
- District: Pudukkottai

Languages
  - Official: Tamil
- Time zone: UTC+5:30 (IST)

Mangalanadu is a village in the Aranthangirevenue block of Pudukkottai district, Tamil Nadu, India.

== Demographics ==
As per the 2001 census, Mangalanadu had a total population of 1988 with 989 males and 999 females. Out of the total population 1254 people were literate.
