= Athani, Pudukkottai =

Village in India

Athani
- village
- Country: India
- State: Tamil Nadu
- District: Pudukkottai

Population (2001)
  - Total: 2,691

Languages
  - Official: Tamil
- Time zone: UTC+5:30 (IST)

Athani is a village in the Aranthangi revenue block of Pudukkottai district, Tamil Nadu, India.

== Demographics ==
As per the 2001 census, Athani had a total population of 2691 with 1338 males and 1353 females. Out of the total population 1564 people were literate.
