= Nevathali =

Village in India

- village
- Country: India
- State: Tamil Nadu
- District: Pudukkottai

Population (2001)
  - Total: 1,138

Languages
  - Official: Tamil
- Time zone: UTC+5:30 (IST)

Nevathali is a village in the Aranthangi revenue block of Pudukkottai district, Tamil Nadu, India.

As per the 2001 census, Nevathali had a total population of 1138, with 565 males and 573 females. Out of the total population 734 people were literate.

The local language is Tamil.

== Location ==
Nevathali is located 402 kilometers from Chennai, the state capital of Tamil.

It is surrounded by the Thiruvarankulam Block to the north and the Arimalam Block to the west.

The postal code is 614624, with the head postal office located in Keeramangalam.
