= Irrumbaanadu =

- village
- Location in Tamil Nadu, India Irrumbaanadu (India)
- Coordinates: 10.0620°N 79.0048°E
- Country: India
- State: Tamil Nadu
- District: Pudukkottai

Population (2001)
  - Total: 4,322

Languages
  - Official: Tamil
- Time zone: UTC+5:30 (IST)

Irrumbaanadu is a village in the Arimalamrevenue block of Pudukkottai district, Tamil Nadu, India.

== Demographics ==
As per the 2001 census, Irumbaanadu had a total population of 4322 with 2128 males and 2194 females. Out of the total population 2467 people were literate.
