= Vaadikkadu, Pudukkottai =

Vaadikkadu
- village
- Country: India
- State: Tamil Nadu
- District: Pudukkottai

Government
  - Type: Village Panchayat

Population (2007)
  - Total: 773

Languages
  - Official: Tamil
- Time zone: UTC+5:30 (IST)
- Postal code: 614624

Vaadikkadu is a village in the Aranthangi revenue block of Pudukkottai district, Tamil Nadu, India.

== Demographics ==
As per the 2007 census, Vaadikkadu had a total population of 773 with 394 males and 374 females.

== Demographics Climate ==
	Summer	Winter
Max.	37 °C (99 °F)	34 °C (93 °F)
Min.	21 °C (70 °F)	18 °C (64 °F)
