= Periyaloor =

Village in India

- village
- Interactive map of Periyaloor
- Coordinates: 10°14′52″N 79°04′33″E
- Country: India
- State: Tamil Nadu
- District: Pudukkottai

Population (2001)
  - Total: 1,937

Languages
  - Official: Tamil
- Time zone: UTC+5:30 (IST)

Periyaloor is a village in the Aranthangi revenue block of Pudukkottai district, Tamil Nadu, India.

== Demographics ==
As per the 2001 census, Periyaloor had a total population of 1937 with 1011 males and 926 females. Out of the total population 1283 people were literate.
