= Nallambalsamuthitram =

Village in India

- village
- Country: India
- State: Tamil Nadu
- District: Pudukkottai

Population (2001)
  - Total: 906

Languages
  - Official: Tamil
- Time zone: UTC+5:30 (IST)

Nallambalsamuthitram is a village in the Arimalamrevenue block of Pudukkottai district, Tamil Nadu, India.

== Demographics ==
As per the 2001 census, Nallambalsamuthitram had a total population of 906 with 413 males and 493 females. Out of the total population 501 people were literate.
