= Pandikkudi =

Village in India

- Village
- Location in Tamil Nadu, India Pandikkudi (India)
- Coordinates: 10.24°N 79.07°E
- Country: India
- State: Tamil Nadu
- Region: South
- Taluk: Aranthangi
- District: Pudukkottai

Area
  - Total: 2 km^{2} (0.77 sq mi)

Languages
  - Official: Tamil
- Time zone: UTC+5:30 (IST)
- PIN: 614624
- Telephone code: (91) 4371
- Vehicle registration: TN 55
- Website: www.pandikkudi.usite.pro

Pandikkudi (Pāṇṭikkuṭi) is a village in Pudukkottai District in the Indian state of Tamil Nadu. It is populated by approximately above Hundred families.

== Education ==
In Aranthangi taluk, Pandikkudi is one of the village. The Government Elementary school is in this village. Up to 5th Standard students are studying there. Students of this village are educated in many fields. 50% of the village peoples are well educated.

== Economy ==
The primary occupation is agriculture. Depend on the rain the cultivation is going in this village. Some farmers are cultivating with the help of pore well water. Abroad money also improve this village status.

== Temples ==
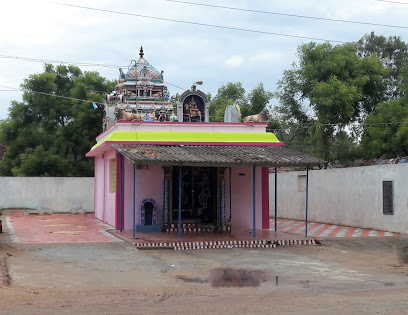
Kalichchiyamman Kovil is placed center of the pandikkudi village

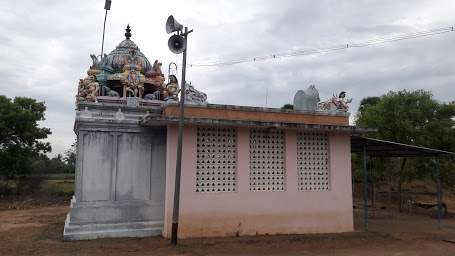
Pillaiyar Kovil is placed North East of the pandikkudi village

Many Temples are in this village. 1. Kalichchiyamman temple (Tamil: கள்ளிச்சியம்மன் கோவில்) is placed center of the village. 2. Pillaiyar temple (Tamil: பிள்ளையார் கோவில்) is placed in North East of the village. 3. Pattavar Iyan temple (Tamil: பட்டவர் ஐயன் கோவில்) is placed in North side of the village. 4. Muni temple is (Tamil: முனி கோவில்) also placed in North side of the village. 5. Kaveri Amman temple is (Tamil: காவேரி அம்மன் கோவில்) also placed in North side of the village.

== Transport ==
Bus facilities are available only in morning and evening except that time people will go to kulamangalm to utilize the transport facility.
