= Arasarkulam Keelpathi =

Village in India

- village
- Nickname: Arasai
- Interactive map of Arasarkulam Keelpathi
- Coordinates: 10.1995248°N 79.1068567°E
- Country: India
- State: Tamil Nadu
- District: Pudukkottai

Population (2001)
  - Total: 3,951

Languages
  - Official: Tamil
- Time zone: UTC+5:30 (IST)

Arasarkulam Keelpathi is a village in the Aranthangi Revenue block of Pudukkottai district, Tamil Nadu, India.

== Demographics ==
Arasarkulam Keelpathi had a total population of 3951 with 1920 males and 2031 females (2011 census). Out of the total population 2704 people were literate. The people of this village earn their living by agriculture and animal keeping. Others also have emigrated to various other countries to earn their living.
