= K.rayavaram =

Village in India

K.Rayapuram Kilanilaikottai Rayapuram
- Village
- Nickname: Great Village
- Country: India
- State: Tamil Nadu
- District: Pudukkottai

Population (2011)
  - Total: 4,815(2,011)

Languages
  - Official: Tamil
- Time zone: UTC+5:30 (IST)

K.Rayapuram is a village in the Arimalam revenue block of Pudukkottai district, Tamil Nadu, India.

== Demographics ==
As per the 2001 census, K.Rayavaram had a total population of 4262 with 1980 males and 2282 females. Out of the total population 2686 people were literate.
