= Amarasimendrapuram =

- village
- Nickname: A.S.Puram
- Country: India
- State: Tamil Nadu
- District: Pudukkottai

Government
  - Panchayat President: K.K.G

Population (2001)
  - Total: 2,085

Languages
  - Official: Tamil, English
- Time zone: UTC+5:30 (IST)

Amarasimendrapuram is a village in the Aranthangirevenue block of Pudukkottai district, Tamil Nadu, India.

== Demographics ==
As per the 2001 census, Amarasimendrapuram had a total population of 2085 with 1011 males and 1074 females. Out of the total population 1190 people were literate.
