= Thanthani =

Village in India

- village
- Country: India
- State: Tamil Nadu
- District: Pudukkottai

Population (2001)
  - Total: 838

Languages
  - Official: Tamil
- Time zone: UTC+5:30 (IST)
- Postal code: 614622

Thanthani is a village in the Aranthangi revenue block of Pudukkottai district, Tamil Nadu, India.

== Demographics ==
As per the 2001 census, Thanthani had a total population of 838 with 437 males and 401 females. Out of the total population, 609 people were literate.
