= Thuraiyur, Pudukkottai =

Village in India

Thuraiyur
- village
- Country: India
- State: Tamil Nadu
- District: Pudukkottai

Population (2001)
  - Total: 1,111

Languages
  - Official: Tamil
- Time zone: UTC+5:30 (IST)

Thuraiyur is a village in the Arimalamrevenue block of Pudukkottai district, Tamil Nadu, India.

== Demographics ==
As of 2001 census, Thuraiyur had a total population of 1111 with 526 males and 585 females. Out of the total population 554 people were literate.
