= Thirunallur, Aranthangi, Pudukkottai =

Village in India

Thirunalur
- village
- Country: India
- State: Tamil Nadu
- District: Pudukkottai

Population (2001)
  - Total: 4,285

Languages
  - Official: Tamil
- Time zone: UTC+5:30 (IST)

Thirunalur is a village in the Aranthangi revenue block of Pudukkottai district, Tamil Nadu, India.

Short history :

Thirunalur village consists of two parts, known as South Thirunalur and North Thirunalur. Paddy fields owned by local residents lie between the two parts of the village.

River Agni flows south and north of the paddy fields. near the river, the auspicious Sri Pozhinjiyaman, who builds and protects the people of these villages, resides in the temple. He has incarnated as a powerful god of this region. Thirunalur also has Pozhinjiamman temple, Mariyamman and Ayyatemples.

== Demographics ==
As of 2001 census, Thirunalur had a total population of 4285 with 2088 males and 2197 females. Out of the total population 2710 people were literate.
