= Sengeerai =

Village in India

- village & post
- Interactive map of Sengeerai
- Country: India
- State: Tamil Nadu
- District: Pudukkottai

Population (2001)
  - Total: 3,016

Languages
  - Official: Tamil
- Time zone: UTC+5:30 (IST)
- Postal code: 622506

Sengeerai is a village in the Arimalamrevenue block of Pudukkottai district, Tamil Nadu, India.

== Demographics ==
As per the 2001 census, Sengeerai had a total population of 3016 with 1480 males and 1536 females. Out of the total population 1685 people were literate.
