= Kadayakudi =

Village in India

- village
- Interactive map of Kadayakudi
- Coordinates: 10°47′49″N 78°51′47″E
- Country: India
- State: Tamil Nadu
- District: Pudukkottai

Languages
  - Official: Tamil
- Time zone: UTC+5:30 (IST)

Kadayakudi is a village in the Arimalamrevenue block of Pudukkottai district , Tamil Nadu, India.
