= Amaradakki =

Village in India

- village
- Interactive map of Amaradakki
- Coordinates: 10.015035°N 79.076790°E
- Country: India
- State: Tamil Nadu
- District: Pudukkottai

Population (2001)
  - Total: 650

Languages
  - Official: Tamil
- Time zone: UTC+5:30 (IST)
- PIN: 614618
- Telephone code: 914371

Amaradakki is a village in the Avudaiyarkoil revenue block of Pudukkottai district, Tamil Nadu, India. The village comes under the Aranthangi legislative assembly, which is dominated by both of the Dravidian parties. In 1960's, many social reformations took place in these area. Appukutty and Siluvai Muthu are notable communist activists at that time. Also siluvai muthu still remembering for his sacrificial death by surrounded area Dalits. The Kanoor and Kasiyarmadam villages are located as the village's boundary.
