= Kammakadu =

Village in Tamilnadu, India

Kammangadu
- village
- Interactive map of Kammangadu
- Coordinates: 10°07′29″N 78°56′34″E
- Country: India
- State: Tamil Nadu
- District: Pudukkottai

Population (2001)
  - Total: 493

Languages
  - Official: Tamil
- Time zone: UTC+5:30 (IST)

Kammangadu is a village in the Aranthangi Revenue block of Pudukkottai district. Pincode 614616, Tamil Nadu, India.

== Demographics ==
As per the 2001 census, Kammangadu had a total population of 493 with 230 males and 263 females. Out of the total population 319 people were literate.
