= Arasarkulam Vadapathy =

Village in India

- village
- Country: India
- State: Tamil Nadu
- District: Pudukkottai

Languages
  - Official: Tamil
- Time zone: UTC+5:30 (IST)

Arasarkulam Vadapathy is a village in the Aranthangi revenue block of Pudukkottai district, Tamil Nadu, India.

== Economy ==
Arasar Kulam has been divided into VadaPadhi (North Quadrant), ThenPadhi (South Quadrant), Keelpadhi (East Quadrant/Quarter) and Melpathi (West Quarter/Quadrant). VadaPadhi & KeelPadhi has been mostly occupied by Hindu brothers. ThenPadhi and Melpadhi has been occupied by Muslims and Hindus. As per the 2001 census, Arasarkulam Thenpathi had a total population of 5233[2] with 1920 males and 2435 females. Out of the total population 2798 people were literate. Now Arasarkulam is well developing area in aranthangi block.
