= Kodivayal =

Village in India

- village
- Country: India
- State: Tamil Nadu
- District: Pudukkottai

Population (2001)
  - Total: 2,589

Languages
  - Official: Tamil
- Time zone: UTC+5:30 (IST)

Kodivayal is a village in the Aranthangirevenue block of Pudukkottai district, Tamil Nadu, India.

== Demographics ==
As per the 2001 census, Kodivayal-EAST had a total population of 2589 with 1319 males and 1270 females. Out of the total population 1612 people were literate.
