= Pudukkottai taluk =

Coordinates: 10.38°N 78.82°E

Pudukkottai taluk is a taluk of Pudukkottai district of the Indian state of Tamil Nadu. The headquarters of the taluk is the town of Pudukkottai

== Demographics ==
According to the 2011 census, the taluk of Pudukkottai had a population of 229,294 with 114,431 males and 114,863 females. There were 1,004 women for every 1,000 men. The taluk had a literacy rate of 76.93%. Child population in the age group below 6 years were 11,406 Males and 10,860 Females.

== Villages ==
There are twenty-seven panchayat villages in Pudukkottai Taluk:

- 9a Nathampannai
- 9b Nathampannai
- Athanakottai
- Ganapathypuram
- Kallukaranpatti
- Karupudayanpatti
- Kavinadu Kilavattam
- Kavinadu Mela Vattam
- Kuppayampatti
- M. Kulavaipatti
- Manaviduthi
- Mangalathupatti
- Mukkampatti
- Mullur
- Perungalur
- Perungkondanviduthi
- Puthampoor
- Samatividuthi
- Seempattur
- Sothupallai
- Thirumalairaya Samutharam
- Thondaiman Oorani
- Vadavalam
- Vagavasal
- Valavampatti
- Vanarapatti
- Varapur
