= Panayapatti =

Village in India

- village
- Location in Tamil Nadu, India Panayapatti (India)
- Coordinates: 10.3124757°N 78.6754829°E
- Country: India
- State: Tamil Nadu
- District: Pudukkottai

Languages
  - Official: Tamil
- Time zone: UTC+5:30 (IST)

Panayapatti is an old chola /pandaya dynasty Mutharayar village in Pudukkottai district, Tamil Nadu, India. It has five Karai peoples and 385 Pulligal. Karai refers to the native people of five main temples in the village. This village controlled 7 other villages (nadu) in ancient days. Pulligal is a plural form of Pulli (meaning dot) in Tamil.

== Historical background ==
This village was a residential attachment to a neighbouring village named MelaiPanaiyur. Panaiyur has references in Silappadikaram. Melai Panaiyur was called "Puram Panaiyan Vaazh koattam" (புரம் பனையான் வாழ் கோட்டம்) - Meaning the abode of 'Iyannar swami'. Since the development of modern facilities such as roads, hospitals and schools, the population migrated to the residential place of Panayapatti. The Temple Festivals including Poochorithal Vila and Agni Palkudam of this village Hosted By People Of 5 Karai Nagarathars have contributed significantly to the development of this village. The school, temples and the other distinct facilities here were constructed and managed by the Nagarathar families of this village.

== Temples in Panayappatti ==
There are five main temples in this village which belongs to each Karai of Mutharayar peoples, who are the first and ancient persons of this village.

1. Lord Vinayaka Temple is located at the border of the village.
2. The village has a temple for Lord Siva in the market place.
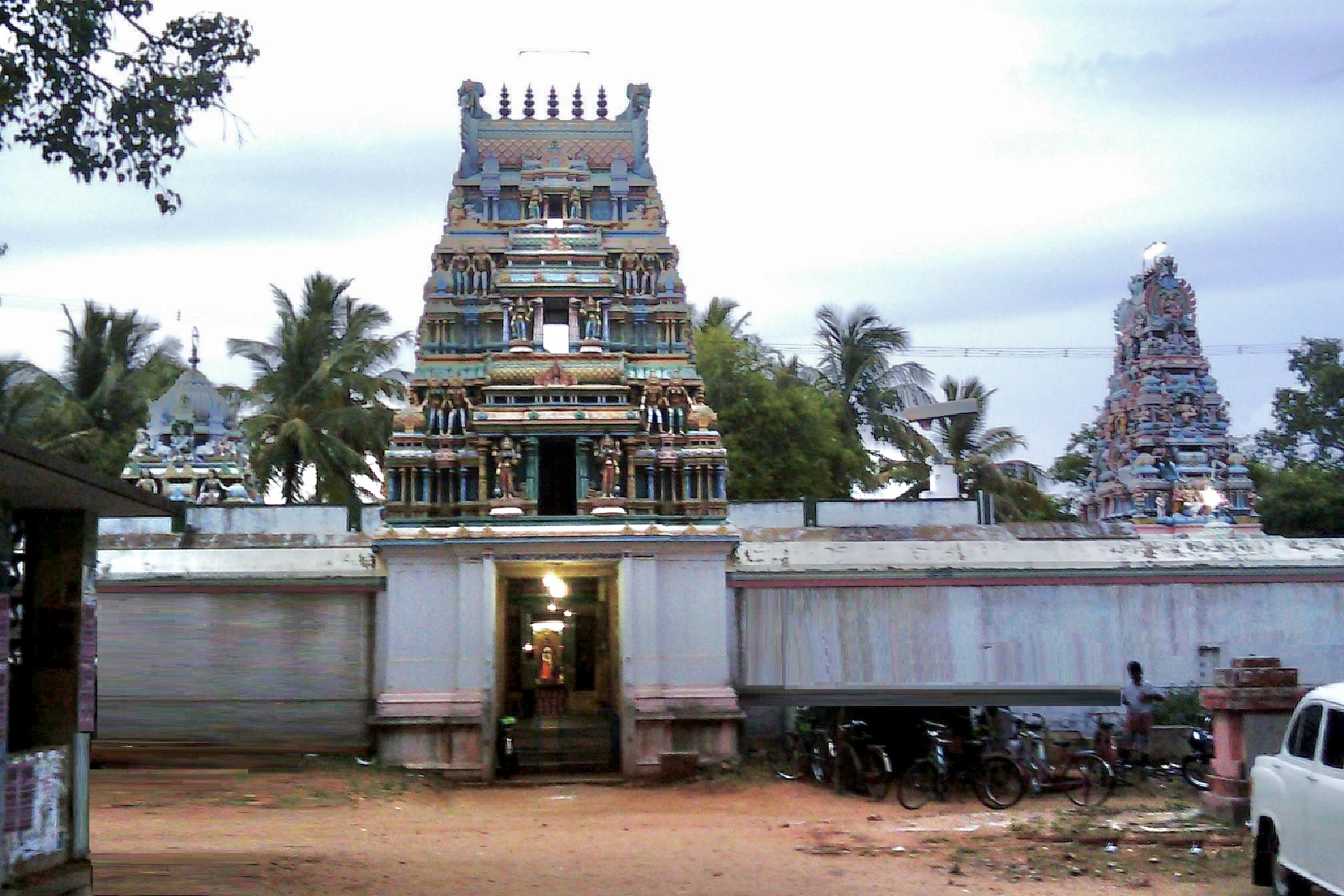
  Panayapatti Sivan temple (Market place)
3. Subbiah swamy temple is another notable place in this village.
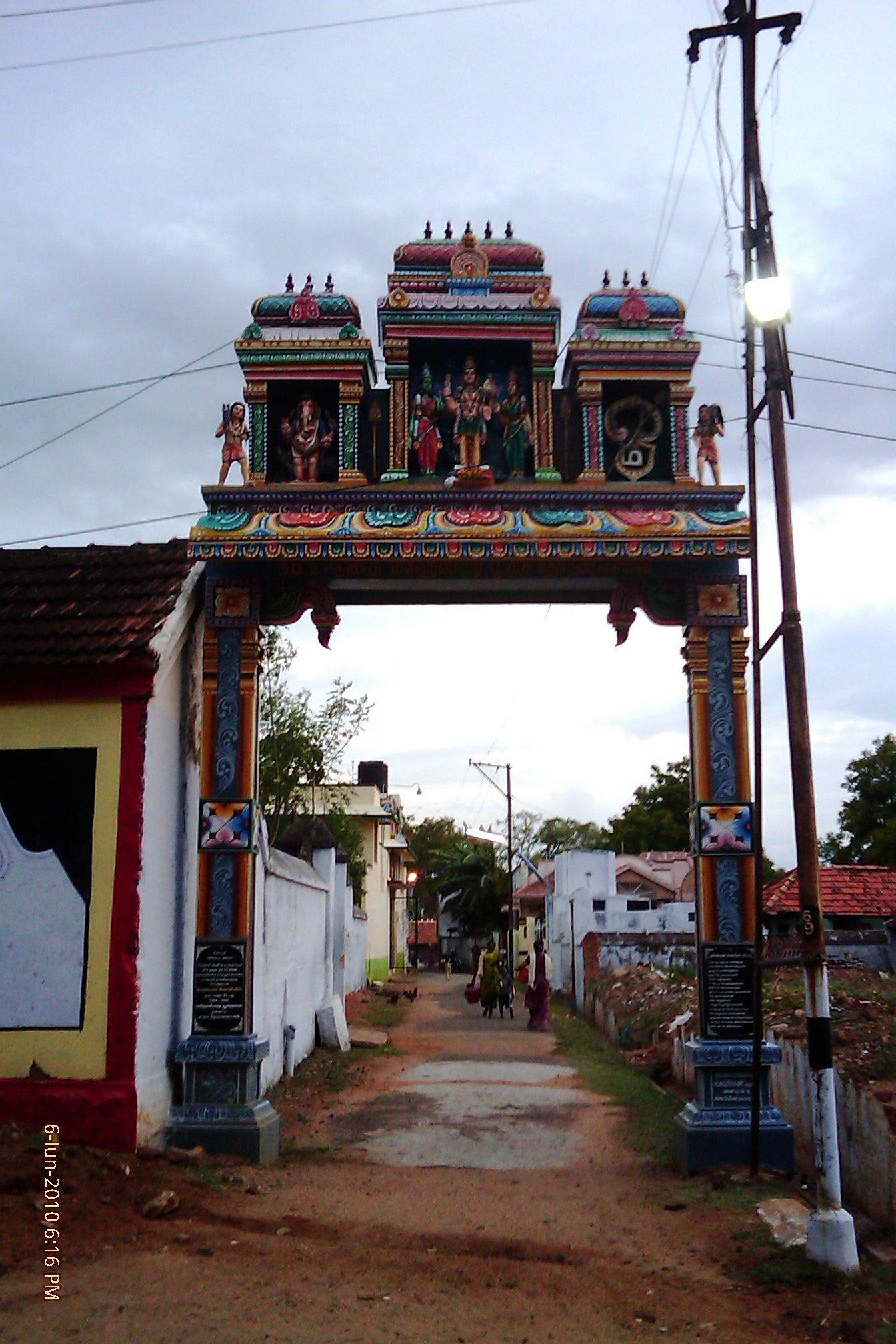
  Panayapatti Subbiah Swamy temple

== Festivals ==
- Konnaiyur Amman Temple Festivals comes in month of March & April and Tamil new year Festival.
- Subbiah Swamy temple attracts the largest crowd during the month of February for its traditional Subbiah Swami Poosai.
- This event is conducted for three days.

The first two days are meant for the pooja and worship. On the third day there is an auction of attractive items donated by the Nagarathar families. The funds generated is used for the upgrade of the temple.

There are a multitude of items, from salt, sugar, rice to toys, books and electronic gadgets usually on exhibit for auction. Some items reach surprisingly high prices in the auction.

For instance, a kilogram of common salt would reach approximately US$250. Lunch is served for any visitors to the temple on those three days, which is sponsored by the Nagarathar families residing in the village.

== Neighbourhood ==
This village comes under the thirumayam taluk of Pudukottai district and has a postal code of 622402.

Kulipirai Road - Panayapatti

While the village's residential streets are generally quiet, commercial activity increases noticeably at the local marketplace during weekly Wednesday markets and on holidays.

The streets are narrow and the roads have hairpin bends which makes it difficult for vehicles to turn. Streets look worn out and unfit for vehicles.

Narrow streets in Panayapatti

There are a few shops, a hospital, a bank, schools and police post at the market place near the temple. A pond adjacent to the temple serves fresh water.

== Commutation ==
This village lies approximately 22 km from Pudukottai and 12 km from Thirumayam. State run buses and private buses serve this village in good frequencies. Most of the buses that way between Pudukottai and Ponnamaravathi pass through this village. Some of the most accessible townships from this village using the public transport are,

- Pudukottai
- Madurai
- Trichy
- Ponnamaravathi
- Karaikudi
- Devakottai

etc.

Market (a.k.a. 'sandhai' in Tamil) will be open on Wednesday
