= Embal =

Village in India

Embal Yembal
- village
- Location within Tamil Nadu Location within India
- Coordinates: 10°01′21″N 78°59′21″E
- Country: India
- State: Tamil Nadu
- District: Pudukkottai

Population (2001)
  - Total: 2,414

Languages
  - Official: Tamil
- Time zone: UTC+5:30 (IST)
- Postal code: 622204

Embal is a village in Arimalam block of Pudukkottai district, Tamil Nadu, India.

== Demographics ==
As per the 2001 census, Embal had a total population of 2414 with 1195 males and 1219 females. Out of the total population 1531 people were literate.
