= Kulipirai =

Village in India

Coordinates: 10°18′N 78°39′E

Kulipirai is a village in Thirumayam Taluk in Pudukkottai District of Tamil Nadu, India. It is located 25 km towards west from district headquarters Pudukkottai. 14 km from Thirumayam. 60 km from Tiruchirapalli. 415 km from State capital Chennai. The nearest airport is Tiruchirapalli International Airport 52 km away.

== Pincode ==
Kulipirai Pin code is 622402.

== Surrounding villages ==
Sevalur (3 km), Melapanaiyur (4 km), Arasamalai (6 km), Kulamangalam (6 km), Mithilaipatti (6 km) are the nearby villages to Kulipirai. Kulipirai is surrounded by Ponnamaravati Taluk towards the west, Annavasal Taluk towards the north, S. Pudur Taluk towards the west, and Pudukkottai Taluk towards the east.

== Surrounding towns ==
Pudukkottai,Ponnamiravathi,thirumayam,Karaikudi, Natham, Sivaganga are the nearby towns to Kulipirai.
