= Keezhappatti =

Village in India

Keezhappatti is a village in Pudukkottai District, Tamil Nadu, India.
