= Kulattur, Avudayarkoil, Pudukkottai =

Village in India

Kulattur
- village
- Country: India
- State: Tamil Nadu
- District: Pudukkottai District
- revenue block: Avudayarkoil block

Population (2011)
  - Total: 177
- Time zone: UTC+05:30 (IST)

Kulattur is a village in the Avudayarkoil block of Pudukkottai district, Tamil Nadu, India.

== Demographics ==
As of 2011 census, Kulattur had a total population of 177 with 77 males and 100 females in 54 households, with 17 children of age 0–6. 41 men and 45 women were literate.
