= Pinnangudi =

Pinnangudi is a tiny village in Illuppur taluk of Pudukkottai district of Tamil Nadu in India.

The village is known for Sthamba Maha Ganapathi temple, which is a unique idol of the Indian God Ganesha on a pillar beside Durga Devi. It is a temple without a roof as it is believed that the Lord of the temple desired that no roof be built. The village also has a Siva temple of Sri Pungavaneswarar and Sri Soundaryanayaki.

Sri Sthamba Maha Ganapathi

The history of Pinnangudi village dates back to 8th century AD. The earliest mention of the village and the Siva temple of Sri Pungavaneswarar is in the Kudumiyanmalai inscription of the 8th century AD during the reign of the Pandiya King Sadaiyan Maran (700–730 AD). The village must have been very fertile and having a functioning village assembly.

There are several inscriptions on the walls of Sri Pungavaneswarar temple which have been studied and recorded by the Archeological Department. Several inscriptions mention the ủr (village) name as Punnangudi. In one such inscription the temple is mentioned as Rajendra Cholisvaram. The current stone structure may have been built in the 11th century and named after Rajendra II (1052–1063 AD).

The inscription on the southern wall of this temple mentions the endowments made to this temple by Sadiran Irasan otherwise known as Kulottunga Chola Kidarattaraiyan, during the reign of Chola King Rajadhiraja II (1166-1178 AD). One inscription also records that during one of his visits, he inquired about the affairs of the temple. Furthermore, inscriptions on the lower side, indicates that similar endowments were also made around 1205 AD during the reign of Chola King Kulottunga III (1178–1218 AD).

One of the inscriptions dating around 1238 AD mentions that the Siva Brahmanas of the temple were given the village during the reign of Maravarman Sundara Pandiyan (1216–1238 AD). Another inscription on the northern wall states that during the reign of Jatavarman Parakraman around 1322 AD, the villagers were unable to pay the Village Tax (Kadamai) and therefore sold the lands to a merchant. In turn, the merchant endowed these lands as Devadanam to the temple.

The southern wall inscription indicates that one Sambandan Ponnambalakoothan, an inhabitant of the village, performed the Kumbhabhisekham of this temple during the reign of Parakrama Pandiya Thevar. Another inscription on the eastern wall beside the stone window, indicates the gift of the window to the central shrine by someone from Tirunalakunram (now known as Kudimiyanmalai).

Sri Pungavaneswarar & Sri Soundaryanayaki

Pinnangudi was inhabited by many Sanskrit scholars who have contributed many works some of which are available in Saraswati mahal Library in Thanjavur. This was one of the two villages in which Vijaya Raghunatha Thondaiman (1730-69 AD) the King of Pudukkotai, as advised by Saint Sadashiva Brahmedra, granted rent-free lands to his Palace Guru Mahabashyam Gopalakrishna Sastrigal. It was then also known as Muktambal Samudram.

Pinnangudi had a close connection with the larger village of Kudumiyanmalai. About 20 to 24 families inhabited the village in the 19th century. The single street "Agraharam" had houses in two parallel rows. However, in the 1890s severe drought which lasted for over a decade, forced the inhabitants to migrate from this village. Most of the families settled elsewhere never to return. However, many of them, kept their link unbroken with the village due to the family Deity. The west end of the village street also had a Perumal (Vishnu) Temple, which at present, is in ruins and beyond recognition. Though the Siva Temple was also neglected and in ruins for several decades, the Deities (Idols) were moved to safety and well preserved.

The reconstruction of the temple started in the later half of 2009. The Maha Kumbabhishegam of this temple was performed on 5 February 2012, after almost a century.
