= Nattampatti =

Village in India

Nattampatti Peacock Village
- village
- Country: India
- State: Tamil Nadu
- District: Pudukkottai

Population
  - Total: 2,000

Languages
  - Official: Tamil
- Time zone: UTC+5:30 (IST)
- PIN: 622202
- Telephone code: 04333
- Vehicle registration: TN-55
- Coastline: 0 kilometres (0 mi)
- Nearest city: Pudukottai
- Sex ratio: 1000:987 ♂/♀
- Lok Sabha constituency: Sivaganga
- Climate: Very cool (Köppen)
- Avg. summer temperature: 40 °C (104 °F)
- Avg. winter temperature: 20 °C (68 °F)
- Website: www.nattampatti.blogspot.com

Nattampatti is a village in Pudukkottai district, Tamil Nadu, India.

People of more than 40 castes live in this village. More than 95% of the people are educated. It is called "Peacock Village" by locals.

== Education ==
There is a school in the district, Panchayaht Union Primary School.
