= Alapiranthan =

Village in Tamil Nadu, India

Alappiranthan
- village
- Interactive map of Alappiranthan
- Coordinates: 10.1810311°N 78.9563071°E
- Country: India
- State: Tamil Nadu
- District: Pudukkottai Aranthangi

Population (2020)
  - Total: 4,590

Official
  - Language: Tamil
- Time zone: UTC+5:30 (IST)
- PIN: 622202 614616
- Vehicle registration: TN 55

Alappiranthan is a main village in the Aranthangi Taluk of Pudukkottai district, Tamil Nadu, India.

== Demographics ==
As per the 2020 census, Alapiranthan had a total population of 4590 with 1855 males and 1970 females. Out of the total population 2000 people were literate.
