= Vennvalkudi =

Vennavalkudi
- Interactive map of Vennavalkudi
- Coordinates: 10.3089478°N 78.9370762°E
- Country: India
- State: Tamil Nadu
- District: Pudukottai

Population
  - Total: 6,059
- Postal code: 622201

Vennavalkudi is a panchayat Village in Alangudi thaluk, Pudukkottai district, in the state of Tamil Nadu, India.

== Geography ==
Vennavalkudi is at 10.3089478°N 78.9370762°E.

== Population ==
Vennavalkudi is a large village located in Alangudi taluk of Pudukkottai district, Tamil Nadu with total 1464 families residing. The Vennavalkudi village has population of 6260 of which 3109 are males while 3151 are females as per Population Census 2011.

== Politics ==
This village belongs to Alangudi (State Assembly Constituency) is part of the Sivaganga (Lok mutharaiyar community constituency)
