= Chettiyapatti =

Village in India

hettiyapatti is a small village in Tamil Nadu, India, located 6 km from Viralimalai Taluk in Pudukkottai District. It is 45 km to the west of the district headquarters Pudukkottai and 386 km from the state capital Chennai. Chettiyapatti is surrounded by Manapparai town towards the west, Kodumbaloor towards the east, Kovilpatti towards the south, and Rajalipatti towards the north.
