= Atthippallam =

Village in India

Athippallam is a village in Vanathirayanpatti Panchayat within the Viralimalai block, Tamil Nadu, India. The population of the village is 1102 (578 Males, 524 Females).

== Temples ==
- Sri Ayyanar Thirukovil
- Sri Mariyamman Thirukovil
- Sri Kaliyamman Thirukovil
- Sri Chithi Vinayagar Thirukovil
- Sri Pidari Amman Thirukovil
- Sri Muniyappa Swamy Thirukovil
- Sri karuppaswamy Thirukovil
