= Karamangalam =

Village in India

- village
- Country: India
- State: Tamil Nadu
- District: Pudukkottai

Population (2001)
  - Total: 1,837

Languages
  - Official: Tamil
- Time zone: UTC+5:30 (IST)

Karamangalam is a village in the Arimalamrevenue block of Pudukkottai district , Tamil Nadu, India.

== Demographics ==
As per the 2001 census, Karamangalam had a total population of 1837 with 916 males and 921 females. Out of the total population 1206 people were literate.
