= Kalikulanvayal =

Village in India

- village
- Country: India
- State: Tamil Nadu
- District: Pudukkottai

Population (2001)
  - Total: 893

Languages
  - Official: Tamil
- Time zone: UTC+5:30 (IST)

Kalikulanvayal is a village in the Arimalamrevenue block of Pudukkottai district , Tamil Nadu, India.

== Demographics ==
As per the 2001 census, Kalikulanvayal had a total population of 893 with 416 males and 477 females. Out of the total population 584 people were literate.
