= Kollanvayal =

Village in India

Kollanvayal Chinna Italy
- Village
- Location in Tamil Nadu, India
- Coordinates: 10.218°N 79.006°E
- Country: India
- State: Tamil Nadu
- District: Pudukkottai

Languages
  - Official: Tamil
- Time zone: UTC+5:30 (IST)
- PIN: 614622
- Telephone code: 04371
- Vehicle registration: TN55Z

Kollanvayal is a village located in Aranthangi Taluk of Pudukkottai district in the state of Tamil Nadu, India. Kollanvayal is situated 2 km away from Silattur, 10 km away from sub-district headquarter Aranthangi and 25 km away from district headquarter Pudukkottai.

== Temples ==
Sri Muthumaari Amman Kovil, Sri Kannudaiyar Rakkammal Kovil and sri karpaga vinayagar kovil

== Education ==
List of educational institutions in Kollanvayal:

- Panchayat Union Elementary School (Tamil: ஊராட்சி ஒன்றிய (கற்றலின் இனிமை ) தொடக்கப் பள்ளி)
