= Melmangalam =

Village in Tamil Nadu, India

Coordinates: 10°06′05″N 77°34′55″E

- Village
- Interactive map of Melmangalam
- Country: India
- State: Tamil Nadu
- District: Pudukkottai

Population (2001)
  - Total: 4,689

Languages
  - Official: Tamil
- Time zone: UTC+5:30 (IST)

Melmangalam is a village in the Andipatti block revenue block of Theni district, Tamil Nadu, India.

== Demographics ==
As per the 2010 census, Melmangalam had a total population of 4689 with 2386 males and 2303 females. Out of the total population, 2784 people were literate.
