= Thirukkalambur =

Village in India

Thirukkalambur is a village located in Pudukkottai District of Tamil Nadu. It is approximately 80 km from Thiruchirapalli (Trichy) and 40 km from Pudukkottai. The nearest towns are Ponnamaravathy and Singampunari (approx. 10 km).

== Temples ==
The salient feature of this place is the two ancient temples situated here, which were built approximately in the 10th century A.D. by the king Thondaiman. The name of one of the temples is Sri Kathali Vaneshwarar temple or Sri Vaithiyanatha swamy temple, and the other one is Sri Thiruvalar Oliswarar temple.

There is a myth about the origin of these temples:

Once this place was a dense forest with banana trees. It was a hunting spot for the rulers at that time. During the 10th century, Mr. Thondaiman was the ruler of this place. While he was hunting, his horse's hoof knocked on an unusual rock in that land. The king then noticed a blood like fluid oozing out from that rock. Subsequently, he became ill. Later he perceived an oracle in his dream which said about the medicine to cure his sickness and told him to build a temple in that place for Lord Shiva. He was cured and built these temples and named them as mentioned above. "Vaithiyanathan" is a Tamil name which means the leader who can heal any disease.

Inside the temple are many banana trees. No one waters these trees. They get water from the rain only. They will be greenery at the summer season also. They are there since the 10th century. No one will touch the trees, because it is believed that one who touches the tree will get "VenKushtam" or "skin disease". The fruits will not be eaten by anyone. They are for God only. They will give those fruits to cow after the Boojai.

The old temple is now called as Sri Thiruvalar Oliswarar Temple, as a lord shiva temple. The god inside the temple is Sivalingam. This temple has been undertaken by the Tamil Nadu Archaeological Department.

Because of the horse's hoof knocked on the Lord Siva, this village was named as Thirukkulambur (in Tamil, kulambu means "animal's paw"). This name was changed as Thirukkalambur in years. Thirukkalambur is also denoted as Maraimaan Vikrama Pandiya Nallur in the temple's stone inscriptions. The reason for this name can be a great theme for history students.

There are some other village temples like Sri Kodiyeri Amman.

There is an unauthenticated tradition that, at the time of the Poligar War of 1799, the famous Kattabomman (கட்டபொம்மன்) of Panchalankurichchi (பாஞ்சாலங்குறிச்சி) and his dumb brother too refuge in the jungles of Tondaiman territory near Thirukkalambur (திருக்களம்பூர்).

== Bodies of water ==
This place also has a water body called Periyakamma which measures around 100+ acres, which is the third biggest of its type within Pudukottai district. This pond also has a nucleus structure referred to as Malaiyadi, which was invented with granite stones in the mid-1990s, one of the most valuable stones used in luxurious buildings. Sadly most of it was exploited during 1995 to 2007.

The other water bodies like Kannathi Kamma, Chekkadi and Kalapiri Kamma, are also of reasonable size.

== Bullfights ==
It is also famous for its yearly Vadi manjuvirattu, which has been ruled out since 2007 due to the ban from the state government. Furthermore, it is about 5 km away from Araliparai, a place where the Araliparai Manjuvirattu, another type of bullfight, still happens yearly once with restrictions.

Thirukkalambur is also the birthplace of numerous bullfighters and one of the well known bullfight commentators, Veeraiyah Police.

== Education ==
Although there is a six-decade-old government public school in this village, education has become mainstream only for the younger generations (people in their twenties and below).

== Employment ==
As of 2018, about 45% of the younger generation are working in countries like Singapore, Malaysia and the Middle East. A few people are into Andaman and Nicobar Islands (India), Sri Lanka, United Kingdom and Denmark as well. Most of the older people are into agriculture. The main farming activity in this village is coconut cultivation, followed by paddy and banana.
