= Kulattur, Aranthangi, Pudukkottai =

Village in India

Kulattur, Pudukkottai
- village
- Country: India
- State: Tamil Nadu
- District: Pudukkottai
- revenue block: Aranthangi

Population (2011)
  - Total: 547

Languages
  - Official: Tamil
- Time zone: UTC+5:30 (IST)

Kulattur, Pudukkottai is a village in the Aranthangi revenue block of Pudukkottai district, Tamil Nadu, India.

== Demographics ==
As of 2011 census, Kulattur had a total population of 547 with 271 males and 276 females in 136 households, with 52 children of age 0–6. 197 men and 122 women were literate.
