= Keezha Pullanviduthi =

Village in India

Keezha Pullanviduthi is a village in Alangudi taluk, Tamil Nadu, India.
