= Vavvaneri =

Vavvaneri Vavvaneri Agraharam
- Hamlet / Village
- Location of Vavvaneri in Tamil Nadu
- Coordinates: 10.66139°N 78.27000°E
- Country: India
- State: Tamil Nadu
- District: Pudukottai
- Taluk: Illuppur
- Former name: Vavvaneri
- Time zone: UTC+05:30 (IST)
- ZIP code(s): 600 xxx,
- Area code: +91-XX
- Official language: Tamil

Vavvaneri is a small village near Kadambarayanpatti in Illupur Taluk, Annavasal Revenue Block in Pudukottai District, Talmil Nadu, India. The PMGSY Code is TN13010345. The Habitation NIC code is 124311413. It has a population of around 280 as per Census 2001.

== Temples in Vavvaneri ==
=== Ayyanar Temple ===
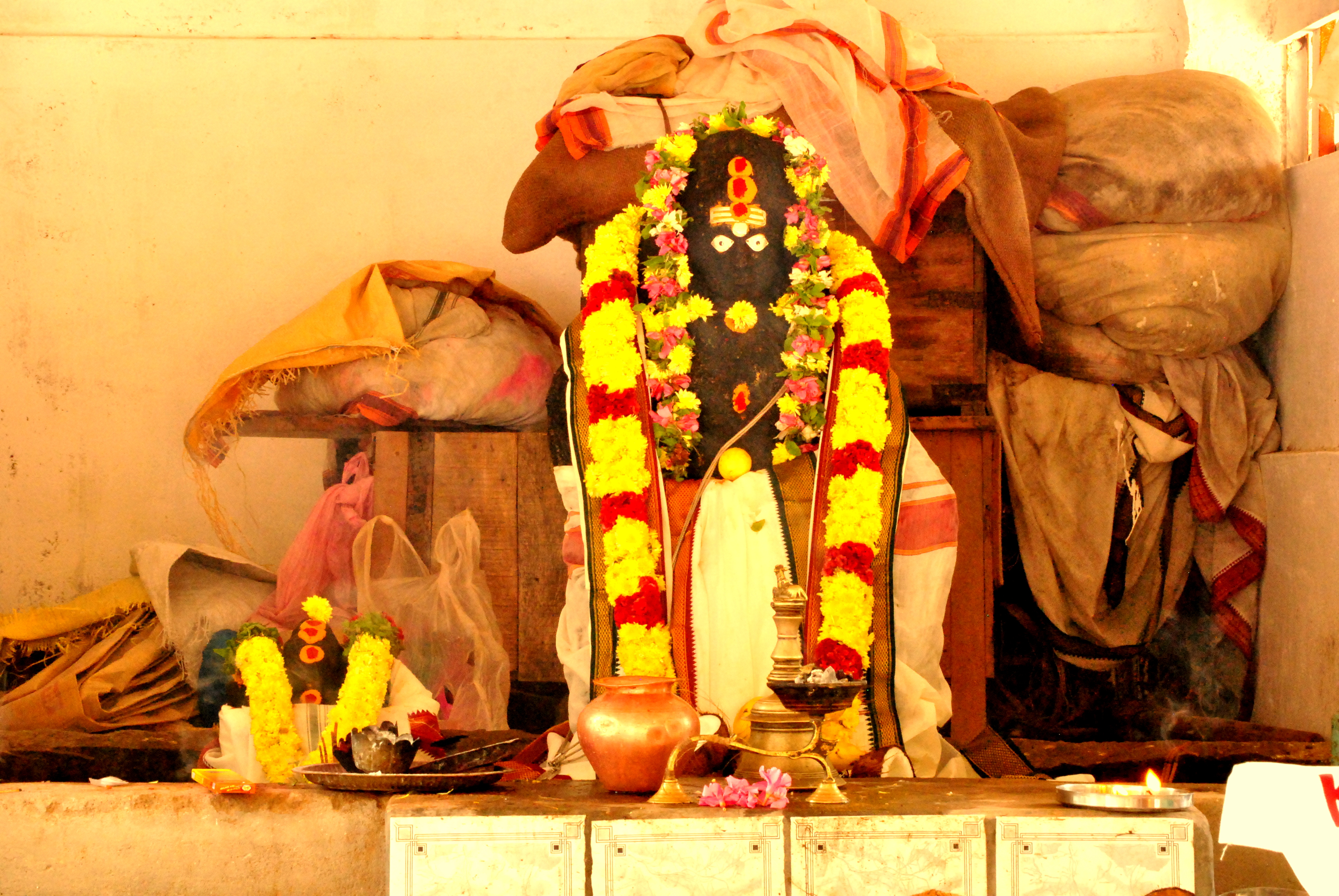
Vavvaneri Ayyanar Temple

The Ayyanar Temple in Vavvaneri is located on the banks of a small storm drain. The main idol is Ayyanar – sometimes referred to as Aadhanamalavi Ayyanar.

=== PidariAmman Temple ===
The PidariAmman Temple in Vavvaneri is located nearer to the hamlet. The main idol is PidariAmman with a small MariAmman idol placed in the same chamber.

=== KaruppuSwamy Temple ===
The KaruppuSwamy Temple is located behind the Ayyanar Temple, almost submerged in a small pond. The pond is dry for most part of the year, and is filled with water during the NE Monsoon Season.
