= Silattur =

Village in India

- Village
- Location in Tamil Nadu, India
- Coordinates: 10.228°N 78.993°E
- Country: India
- State: Tamil Nadu
- District: Pudukkottai

Government
  - Type: Gram Panchayat

Population (2011)
  - Total: 5,099

Languages
  - Official: Tamil
- Time zone: UTC+5:30 (IST)
- PIN: 614622
- Telephone code: 04371

Silattur is a large village located in Aranthangi Taluk of Pudukkottai district in the state of Tamil Nadu, India. Silattur is also called Small Singapore.

As of 2011, a total 1289 families were residing in Silattur Village. As per the Constitution of India and Panchyati Raaj Act, Silattur village is administrated by Sarpanch (Head of Village) who is the elected representative of village. Silattur is situated 10 km away from sub-district headquarter Aranthangi and 25 km away from district headquarter Pudukkottai.

== Geography ==
Silattur is located at 10.228°N 78.933°E. Total geographical area of Silattur village is 11.52 km2 and it is the 5th Biggest Village by area in the Sub District. Population density of the village is 443 persons per km2.

== Demographics ==
As per the 2011 census, Silattur had a total population of 5099, of which 2528 are males while 2571 are females. In Silattur village population of children with age 0–6 is 514 which makes up 10.08% of total population of village. Silattur village has higher literacy rate compared to Tamil Nadu. In 2011, literacy rate of Silattur village was 82.66% compared to 80.09% of Tamil Nadu. In Silattur Male literacy stands at 89.39% while female literacy rate was 76.06%.

== Temples ==
- Sri Ponnambalanathar Aalayam
- Arulmiku Sri Muthumaari Amman ThirukKovil
- Arulmiku Sri Veeramakali Amman Kovil
- Ayyanar Kovil
- Sri Maduraiveeran & Kombukaran Kovil
- Sri Aathi Arupadai Veedu Murugan Kovil
- Sri Theradi Karuppar Kovil
- Arasamaram Sri Valampuri Vinayakar kovil
- Sri Nondi Ayya Temple
- Sri Raja Ganapathi Temple
- Sri Chinniyamman Temple

== Education ==
- Government Boys Higher Secondary School
- Government Girls Higher Secondary School
- Panchayat Union Elementary School
- Swamy Vivekananda Nursery and Primary School
- Yazh Academy Nursery and Primary School

== Banks ==
- State Bank of India
- City Union Bank

== Hospital ==
Government Hospital 24hrs.
