= Sundampatti =

Village in India

- Village
- Interactive map of Sundampatti
- Coordinates: 10.54148°N 79.03604°E
- Country: India
- State: Tamil Nadu
- District: Pudukkottai
- Taluk: Gandarvakottai

Government
  - Body: Gandarvakkottai Union

Languages
  - Official: Tamil, English
- Time zone: UTC+5:30 (IST)
- PIN: 613301
- Telephone code: 04322
- Vehicle registration: TN55
- Gandharvakottai: Trichy
- Lok Sabha Constituency: Trichy
- MLA Constituency: Gandarvakkottai
- Civic agency: Gandarvakkottai Union
- Climate: hot and sunny (rarely cloudy) (Köppen)

Sundampatti is a village in the Pudukkottai district in the Indian state of Tamil Nadu. It is located about 5 kilometers from Gandarvakottai.

== Economy ==
The primary occupation is agriculture. Once situated on fertile and arable land, regular precipitation has recently become rarer in the village and the surrounding area. Hence, local farmers have struggled to maintain agricultural productivity levels.

== Demographics ==
Sundampatti has a low literacy rate of 67.04%, below Tamil Nadu's average of 80.09%.

According to the 2011 India Census, Sundampatti's male literacy stands at 78.75%, while the female literacy rate is 56.05%, marking a significant gender divide. The sex ratio of Sundampatti Village is 1077 which is higher than Tamil Nadu's state average of 999.

Children between the ages of 0 and 6 number 373, making up 10.82% of the total. The child sex ratio for the Sundampatti is 1169, higher than Tamil Nadu's average of 943.78.

== Governance ==
The [panchayat consists of Sundampatti, Maruneengi Oorani (Marungoorani), Kollampatti, Rasapatti, Melapatti, Pudupatti, and Peruchu Vanniyampatti. It is one of the villages of Musiri among 32 Vellalar villages [Musugunda Vellala). The voter roll is greater than 2,500. While most of the villages are based around Pattukkottai taluk, Sundampatti, Mattangal, Sivanthanpatti, and Keerathoor are in the Gandarvakkottai Taluk.

Until 2011, only residents of Sundampatti could be elected as panchayat president. In the local election in 2011, a person from Kollampatti became the first president of the Sundampatti Panchayat.

== Infrastructure ==
The village first received electricity in the early 1970s. It has a mobile phone tower, which connects to a landline network. The village is connected to neighboring towns with paved roads.
