= Nachandupatti =

Nachandupatti Nal santhanu patti
- Village
- Location in Tamil Nadu, India Nachandupatti (India)
- Coordinates: 10.323811°N 78.723305°E
- Country: India
- State: Tamil Nadu
- District: Pudukkottai
- Elevation: 82 m (269 ft)

Population (2001)
  - Total: 86,422

Languages
  - Official: Tamil
- Time zone: UTC+5:30 (IST)
- PIN: 622404
- Telephone code: 914333

Nachandupatti is a small town located 16 kilometres from Pudukkottai in the Pudukkottai district of the Indian state of Tamil Nadu. Many members of the Nagarathar groups are among its inhabitants. The town contains historic temples. Various festivals and religious ceremonies take place here. There are many small villages around Nachandupatti including Pudur and Kottur.

== Name ==
The original name of this place was Thirumalai Sam Uthiram. A fort was being built at Thirumayam for the residence of Oomaithurai (younger brother of Kattaboman). Good quality lime mortar (called sandhu or saanthu in Tamil) was prepared in this village. Hence, this place was also called Nar-Chandu-Patti or Nalla-Saanthu-Patti. Its name changed over a period of time to Nachandupatti.

== General information ==
The village's predominate industry is agriculture. Primary concerns for the village include education provisions, access to drinking water, roads, access to electricity, and access to healthcare services.

Nachandupatti is located 69km from Tiruchirapalli, 17km from Pudukottai and Ponnamaravathi. It covers an area of 3.6km^{2}, with a population of over 3500 people. Its pin code number is 622404.

The village contains many Nagarathar houses built about 100 to 200 years ago, which are renowned for their architectural simplicity.

Each house of the village has a peculiar nickname like Kaattu Meeni Aayal Veedu or Subban Chettiar Veedu.

== Demographics ==
In addition to the Nagarathar community there are people from other caste like Pillai too. Nagarathar caste people in Nachandupatti mostly belong to the following five nagarathar kovils Pillayarpatti, Vairavan Kovil, Elayathangudi, Ilupakudi, and Mathur.

== Facilities ==
=== Public and commercial services ===
There is an ICICI bank, providing a locker division. An ATM of the Union Bank of India. is also present. There is also an Indian government post office. Other facilities include a public library and an Internet-browsing center. The state bank ATM service is available in Nachandupatti.

There are three water tanks available in Nachandupatti with rain-water harvesting facility. Two of which are for non-drinking water and the third one is exclusively for drinking water.

A Sunday market (Sandhai) occurs every week near Sivan kovil oorani.

=== Education ===
There is a higher secondary school named Ramanathan Chettiar Higher Secondary School, and an elementary school called Sri Shanmuga Vilaasa Kalaasaalai.

=== Transport ===
Cab service is available round the clock. There are bus services to the nearby towns like Pudukottai and Ponnamaravathy, and direct bus services to Chennai and Madurai.

The nearest airport is Trichy airport which is just 55 km away.

== Community activity ==
To take care of elderly Nagarathar residents, a food scheme "Nagarathar Nala Maiyam" was started by some Nagarathars from Nachandupatti. This scheme is the first of its kind in Chettinad villages and now has been embraced in many other Chettinad villages too. In this scheme, food is delivered three times a day to the doors of elderly people for a very nominal fee of Rs 1000 per month. In addition the elderly residents receive a monthly free medical check. The expenses of the scheme are shared by local Nagarathar residents.

To safeguard the valuables of Nagarathars, a locker division has been established by local Nagarathars.

Rukmini Goshala at Nachandupatti is a cozy and divine home to the native breed of cows.

== Religion ==
The deity Malayalingaswamy is worshipped here. The god Vairavar is also considered to be very powerful.

Thai Poosam is a famous festival in this temple. During Thai Poosam people perform Annadhaanam. Other ceremonies include Kavadi by devotees, and Thotti-Kattudhal for new born babies.

Adaikammai Appathal Padaippu function is celebrated every two years in the Tamil month of Adi, on the 3rd Friday, at Adaikammai Appathal Padaipu Veedu. Members of Ilupakudi Kovil from 36 villages assemble together during this function. 2nd Friday of Adi the function starts in Thuvar Kovil with paal pongal. On the day of function people prepare pongal and paniyaram. Food is presented to God. Auction is conducted on 3rd Saturday of Adi. The 'Paal Paanai' or 'Vinayaga Paanai' will be auctioned first. The person who gets the paal panai will be considered royal in the village.

No.1 Nagarathar website for Padaippu veedu, where you can find all the kovil events: http://www.adaikkammaiappathal.com/. Worldwide it has 85000 website visitors.

=== Places of worship ===
There are many famous temples in and around Nachandupatti. One which is 200 years old is called 'Karrupar Kovil'.

During the Pallava regime, they carved temples within hills/ mountains. One such Shiva temple found in Nachandupatti is Malayakovil. Later a temple to Muruga was built by Nagarathars at the top of the mountain temple.

1. Chinna oorani Pilliyar

2. Sivan Temple

3. Murugan Temple

4. Sri Muthumariyyamman Temple [Pudur]

5. Perumal Temple

6. Iyyappan Temple

7. Mosque [Pudur]

8. Naga Devi Nallathangal Temple

9. Malaiakovil

10.Peraiyur Naganatha Swamy Temple

11. Azghai appathal padaippu veedu

The Sri Muthumariyyamman Temple [Pudur] is more than 500 years old. A yearly function is celebrated here throughout vaikasi month.
