= Avanathankottai =

Village in Tamil Nadu, India

Avanathankottai Avattrankottai Avanam Attra Kottai
- Village
- Location in Tamil Nadu, India
- Coordinates: 10°14′15″N 79°02′40″E
- Country: India
- State: Tamil Nadu
- District: Pudukkottai

Population (2001)
  - Total: 2,329

Languages
  - Official: Tamil
- Time zone: UTC+5:30 (IST)

Avanathankottai is a village in the Aranthangi revenue block of Pudukkottai district, Tamil Nadu, India.

== Demographics ==
As per the 2001 census, Avanam attrankottai had a total population of 2329 with 1164 males and 1165 females. Out of the total population 1661 people were literate.
