= Kulathur, Gandharvakottai, Pudukkottai =

Village in India

Coordinates: 9°00′N 78°12′E

Kulathur
- village
- Interactive map of Kulathur
- Country: India
- State: Tamil Nadu
- District: Pudukkottai District
- revenue block: Gandharvakottai block

Population (2011)
  - Total: 3,275
- Time zone: UTC+05:30 (IST)
- Postal code: 614902

Kulathur is a village in the Gandharvakottai block of Pudukkottai district, Tamil Nadu, India.

== Demographics ==
As of 2011 census, Kulathur had a total population of 3,275 with 1,620 males and 1,655 females in 719 households, with 360 children of age 0–6. 1,216 men and 896 women were literate.
