= Gandarvakottai =

Town in India

- town
- Location in Tamil Nadu, India Gandarvakottai (India)
- Coordinates: 10°36′0″N 79°1′0″E
- Country: India
- State: Tamil Nadu
- District: Pudukkottai

Languages
  - Official: Tamil
- Time zone: UTC+5:30 (IST)
- PIN: 613301
- Telephone code: 04322
- Vehicle registration: TN-55
- Coastline: 0 kilometres (0 mi)
- Nearest city: Thanjavur
- Lok Sabha constituency: Trichy
- Avg. summer temperature: 40 °C (104 °F)
- Avg. winter temperature: 25 °C (77 °F)

Gandarvakottai is a taluk under Pudukkottai district, Tamil Nadu, India. It is the big town between Pudukottai and Thanjavur. The nearest city is Thanjavur, 22 km away.

Gandarvakottai is the junction of 36 village peoples. Thuvar, Veladipatti, Manjampatti, Pisanathur, Sundampatti, Mattangal, Sivanthanpatti, Aravampatti, and Komapuram are the main villages in the vicinity. Many higher secondary schools and matriculation schools are there. In Gkt 1000year-old siva temple, 500 year old Kothanda ramar temple, Mariamman temple, kamakshi temple, ayappan temple, church and mosque are here. The most common occupation is agriculture and most people are daily wagers. Gkt has many engineers, doctors, businessmen and a few architects. The nearest seaport is Tuticorin, which is situated 380 km from Gkt. The nearest airport is Tiruchirapalli Airport, which is about 32 km from Pudukkottai. Regular air services available between Trichy, Colombo, Sharjah, Chennai, Kuwait, Singapore, Malaysia and Cochin.

== Geography ==
It is located at . Gandarvakottai is a village panchayat located in the Pudukkottai district of Tamil-Nadu state, India. The latitude 10.523931 and longitude 78.963547 are the geocoordinate of the Gandarvakottai. Chennai is the state capital for Gandarvakottai village. It is located around 375 kilometers away from Gandarvakottai. Nearby districts are Thanjavur (30 km), Trichy (45 km) and Madurai (150 km). Tanjore Brahadeeswara Temple is nearby.

== Demographics ==
As per the 2001 census, Gandarvakottai had a total population of 79925 with 39984 males and 39941 females. Out of the total population 43,937 people were literate.
