= Aranthangi =

Aranthangi Arantāngi
- Town
- Location in Tamil Nadu, India
- Coordinates: 10.1631°N 78.9962°E
- Country: India
- State: Tamil Nadu
- District: Pudukkottai

Government
  - Type: First Grade Municipality
  - Body: Aranthangi Municipality
  - Rank: 1

Population (2011)
  - Total: 40,814
  - Rank: 5

Languages
  - Official: Tamil
- Time zone: UTC+5:30 (IST)
- PIN: 614616
- Telephone code: 04371
- Vehicle registration: TN 55
- Nearest City: Karaikudi

Aranthangi is a town in Pudukkottai district in the state of Tamil Nadu, India. As of 2011, it had a population of 40,814.

== Geography ==
The town lies 10 degrees north in latitude and 70 degrees east in longitude and lies 32.31 m above mean sea level. The small river Vellar goes through the outer part of Aranthangi.

The main centre of attraction is a ruined fort. The walls are not constructed of brick or stone. Large interstices are filled with mud. There are no ruins of palaces or any other striking building inside. There is no indication when the fort could have been built. A line of Tondaimans who were unconnected with those of Pudukkottai, were in power here in the fifteenth and sixteenth centuries, and it is believed that they constructed it. The temple of Rajendra Chola Varma in the town seems to have been built in the eleventh century.

Aranthangi was ruled by Thondaimans (different from Pudukkottai Thondaimans) in earlier days.(The time is unknown; see the book Pudukkottai Maavatta Varalaru.)

== Transport ==
This town can be reached by bus and trains. There was one runway constructed during World War II, but it has been demolished. The two main state highways passing through: Thanjavur-Sayalkudi Road and manamelkudi EC road and Trichy Mimisal Road. There is one bus stand which has up-to Chennai route and tirupathi route. Buses are often available for Pudukkottai (38 km) and Karaikudi (34 km) and Thanjavur (90 km) which is near Trichy (86 km) Pattukottai (45;km)

== Economy ==
The town has one sugar factory and a chemical factory in its outskirts. Aranthangi has a fish market, a daily market (santhai), uzhavar sandai and the weekly santhai is held every Tuesday. Sea cuisine is well known here because of the proximity to coastal towns. Aranthangi fish curry is famous locally. The main source of income is agriculture. Paddy, groundnut and sugarcane are the major crops. Paddy is prominently grown in some nearby villages. People have also emigrated to Arabic and European countries and have found careers in these areas to earn for their family.

== Demographics ==
Religious census
Religion	Percent(%)
Hindu	74.52%
Muslim	22.01%
Christian	3.42%
Sikh	0.01%
Other	0.04%

The second largest town in Pudukkottai district after the headquarters, Aranthangi was the most populous locality in the south of the Thanjavur district till it was added to Pudukkottai district in 1974. The main areas are Velayutham Pillai Nagar, Anna Nagar, Tower Pitch, Kottai, L.N.Puram, Pakkudi, Vikneshwarapuram, Sivan Kovil & Vadiyan street and all over.

According to 2011 census, Aranthangi had a population of 40,814 with a sex-ratio of 1,030 females for every 1,000 males, much above the national average of 929. A total of 4,340 were under the age of six, constituting 2,203 males and 2,137 females. Scheduled Castes and Scheduled Tribes accounted for 5.75% and 0.76% of the population respectively. The average literacy of the town was 80.96%, compared to the national average of 72.99%. Aranthangi had 10,130 households. There were 13,021 workers, comprising 462 cultivators, 701 main agricultural labourers, 313 in household industries, 10,033 other workers, 1,512 marginal workers, 74 marginal cultivators, 156 marginal agricultural labourers, 253 marginal workers in household industries and 1,029 other marginal workers.

As per the religious census of 2011, Aranthangi had 74.52% Hindus, 22.01% Muslims, 3.42% Christians, 0.01% Sikhs, 0.0% Buddhists, 0.0% Jains, and 0.04% following other religions.

== Climate ==
The minimum temperature of Aranthangi is 27.1 °C and the maximum temperature is 46.4 °C. The seasonal climate conditions are moderate and the weather is uniformly salubrious. The town gets major rainfall during the North east monsoon period. The Annual normal rainfall varies from 300 mm to 800 mm.

== Education ==
Several schools and colleges are in Aranthangi. Half of the pupils get their education from government and government-aided schools. There are also private schools in and around the town.

== Hospitals ==
The government hospital is on the Pattukottai road and many private hospitals are also available. Subramania Puram, Nagudi, Poovathakkudi, Manamelkudi taluk and Arasarkulam have separate government hospitals.

== Notable people ==
- Gopinath Chandran, Indian television anchor and writer
- Aranthangi Nisha, actress and comedian
- Su. Thirunavukkarasar, Indian politician
- Bose Venkat, Indian actor and director

== See also ==
- Avanathankottai
- Pudukkottai
