= Revenue block =

Sub-division of an Indian state district

Revenue blocks, revenue circles, firka, or patwar circles are the local revenue sub-divisions of the various districts of the states of India. The revenue blocks exist to simplify local administration, and each consists of a small number of revenue villages, governed by a revenue inspector. The revenue inspector is charged with a number of key administrative roles, most notably the identification and collection of tax revenue. Sometimes the land area in a revenue circle is identified as an inspector land revenue circle for administrative purposes. While revenue blocks may be as large as or larger than a tehsildar, revenue circles are generally smaller. In the state of Tamil Nadu alone, there are 1,349 revenue blocks.
