= Viralimalai block =

Revenue block in Pudukkottai district, Tamil Nadu, India

Viralimalai block is a revenue block in Pudukkottai district, Tamil Nadu, India. It has a total of 45 panchayat villages.

== Villages of Viralimalai block ==
1. Agarapatti
2. Alangudi, Pudukkottai
3. Avoor
4. Boothakudi
5. Kalamavur
6. Kalkudi
7. Kasavanur
8. Kathaloor
9. Kodumbaloor
10. Komangalam
11. Kongudipatti
12. Kumaramangalam
13. Kunnathur, Pudukkottai
14. Lakshmananpatti
15. Madhiyanipatti
16. Mandaiyur
17. Maruthampatti
18. Mathoor
19. Meboothakudi
20. Meenaveli
21. Melapatchaikudi
22. Nadupatti
23. Nambampatti
24. Nangupatti
25. Neerpalani
26. Pakkudi
27. Pallandanpatti
28. Perambur, Pudukkottai
29. Poyyamani
30. Rajagiri, Pudukkottai
31. Rajalipatti
32. Sooriyur
33. Thengaithinnipatti
34. Thennambadi
35. Thennathirayanpatti
36. Theravur
37. Thondamannallur
38. Vadugapatti, Pudukkottai
39. Vanathirayanpatti
40. Velur, Pudukkottai
41. Vemmani
42. Vilapatti
43. Viralimalai, Pudukkottai
44. Viralur
45. Viruthapatti
