= Maravanpatti =

Village in India

- Village
- Location within India
- Coordinates: 10°24′59″N 79°3′29″E
- Country: India
- State: Tamil Nadu
- District: Pudukkottai
- Subdistrict: Karambakudi
- Population (2011): 3,200

Maravanpatti is a small village located in the Karambakudi block in the Pudukkottai district. It is located 30 kilometres (19 mi) from Pudukottai Bus stop and 15 kilometres (9 mi) from Alangudi. Maravanpatti is administered under Karambakudi, and is considered under Kanakkankadu Panchayath. It has a population of 3,200 living in 678 households (as of 1 March 2011).

== Chithirai Thiruvizha ==
The festival of Chithirai Thiruvizha is celebrated every year on the full moon day of Chithirai. This is a three-day festival. Anyone who has left the village for work returns home for the festival. Several cultural programs are hosted in the temple grounds, with each program sponsored by a family from the village.
