= Periyannan Arasu =

Member of the Legislative Assembly, Tamil Nadu Legislative Assembly
- In office 2016–2021
- Preceded by: V. R. Karthik Thondaiman
- Succeeded by: V. Muthuraja
- Constituency: Pudukkottai

Personal details
- Born: 15 May 1968 Melakkottai, Pudukkottai District
- Party: Dravida Munnetra Kazhagam
- Profession: Politician

Periyannan Arasu is an Indian politician and a former member of the Tamil Nadu Legislative Assembly (MLA).

== Hometown ==
Arasu hails from Pudukkottai town in Pudukkottai District.

== Education ==
Periyannan Arasu completed his Master of Science (M.Sc.) degree at Poondi Pushpam College in Thanjavur.

== Political career ==
Periyannan Arasu belongs to the Dravida Munnetra Kazhagam (DMK). He contested and won the election for the Pudukkottai Assembly constituency in the 2016 Tamil Nadu Legislative Assembly election, subsequently becoming its Member of Legislative Assembly.

== Electoral Performance ==
=== 2016 ===
2016 Tamil Nadu Legislative Assembly election: Pudukkottai
Party	Candidate	Votes	%	±%
DMK	Periyannan Arassu	66,739	39.19%	−5.37
AIADMK	V. R. Karthik Thondaiman	64,655	37.97%	New
Independent	M. Chokkalingam	22,973	13.49%	New
DMDK	Jahir Hussain	7,810	4.59%	New
NOTA	NOTA	1,637	0.96%	New
NTK	M. Arunmozhichozhan	1,625	0.95%	New
IJK	G. Kumar	1,061	0.62%	New
Independent	A. Radhakrishnan	913	0.54%	New
Margin of victory		2,084	1.22%	−0.99%
Turnout		170,282	74.75%	−4.14%
Registered electors		227,802		
DMK gain from AIADMK		Swing	-7.58%	
