= Ponnamaravathi block =

Ponnamaravathi block is a revenue block in Pudukkottai district, Tamil Nadu, India. It has a total of 42 panchayat villages.

== Villages of Ponnamaravathi block ==
1. Alampatti
2. Alavayal
3. Ammakuruchi
4. Arasamalai
5. Anjupulipatti
6. Bagavandipatti
7. Edayathur
8. Enathy
9. Gudalur, Pudukkottai
10. Kallampatty
11. Kandiyanatham
12. Karaiyur
13. Kattupatty
14. Keelathaniyam
15. Konnaipatti
16. Konnaiyampati
17. Koppanapatti
18. Kovanoor, Pudukkottai
19. M.usilampatti
20. Maravamadurai
21. Menilai, T.malampatti
22. Melasivapuri
23. Melathaniyam
24. Mullipatti
25. Mylapore, Pudukkottai
26. Nagarapatti
27. Nallur, Pudukkottai
28. Nerunjikudi
29. Oliyamangalam
30. P.usilampatti
31. R.palakurichi
32. Semboothi
33. eranoor
34. Sevalur
35. Sundaram, Pudukkottai
36. Thennur, Pudukkottai
37. Thirukalambur
38. Thoodur
39. Thottiyampatti
40. Valakurichi
41. Varpet
42. Vegupatti
43. Vendanpatti
