= R. Nedunchezhiyan =

Member-Tamil Nadu Legislative Assembly
- In office 2006–2011
- Preceded by: C. Vijayabasker
- Succeeded by: S. P. Muthukumaran
- Constituency: Pudukkottai

Personal details
- Born: 1 June 1971 Thurugapatti
- Party: All India Anna Dravida Munnetra Kazhagam
- Profession: Advocate

R. Nedunchezhiyan is an Indian politician and a former Member of the Tamil Nadu Legislative Assembly. He hails from Thurugapatti village in Pudukkottai district. Nedunchezhiyan, who holds a Bachelor of Science (B.Sc.) and a Bachelor of Law (B.L.) degree. He belongs to the All India Anna Dravida Munnetra Kazhagam (AIADMK) party. He contested and won from the Pudukkottai assembly constituency in the general elections of Tamil Nadu assembly during the year 2006 and become a Member of Tamil Nadu Legislative Assembly.

== Electoral performance ==
=== 2006 ===
2006 Tamil Nadu Legislative Assembly election: Pudukkottai
Party	Candidate	Votes	%	±%
AIADMK	R. Nedunchezhian	64,319	42.18%	−11.78
DMK	M. Jaffarali	62,369	40.90%	+6.53
BJP	Durai Dhiviyanathan	13,559	8.89%	New
DMDK	S. Javaheer	6,880	4.51%	New
TNJC	M. Arumugam	837	0.55%	New
Independent	P. Vijayakumar	811	0.53%	New
Independent	A. Vetriselvam	770	0.50%	New
Margin of victory		1,950	1.28%	−18.31%
Turnout		152,502	75.49%	10.67%
Registered electors		202,027		
AIADMK hold		Swing	-11.78%	
