= J. Mohammad Gani =

Indian politician

Tamil Nadu Assembly-Member
- In office 1985–1989
- Preceded by: Rajakumar Vijaya Raghunatha Thondaiman
- Succeeded by: A. Periannan
- Constituency: Pudukkottai

Personal details
- Born: 21 March 1955 Pudukkottai
- Party: Indian National Congress
- Profession: Trader

J. Mohammad Gani is an Indian politician and a former Member of the Tamil Nadu Legislative Assembly. He belongs to Pudukkottai district of Tamil Nadu. Gani contested and won the Pudukkottai assembly constituency election on behalf of the Congress party in the 1984 Tamil Nadu Assembly elections. In this election, out of the 137,340 voters in the constituency 107,384 votes were polled (78.2%). Mohammad Gani secured 63,877 votes and defeated Subbiah of the Communist Party of India (CPI), who came in second, by a margin of 37,663 votes.

== Electoral performance ==
=== 1984 ===
1984 Tamil Nadu Legislative Assembly election: Pudukkottai
Party	Candidate	Votes	%	±%
INC	J. Mohammad Gani	63,877	62.37%	+12.66
CPI	K. R. Subbiah	26,214	25.60%	−22.79
INC(J)	S. Chelladhuri	7,354	7.18%	New
Independent	A. Sundaravel Udayar	3,018	2.95%	New
Independent	R. Samiaiah Kadavarar	1,023	1.00%	New
Independent	M. Lakshmanan	690	0.67%	New
Margin of victory		37,663	36.77%	35.45%
Turnout		102,418	78.19%	4.12%
Registered electors		137,340		
INC hold		Swing	12.66%	
