= Ponvasinathar Temple, Iluppur =

Shiva temple in Tamil Nadu, India

Ponvasinathar Temple is a Hindu temple dedicated to the deity Shiva, located at Iluppur of Pudukkottai district in Tamil Nadu, India.

== Location ==
This temple is located at a distance of 10 km from Viralimalai, 20 km from Trichy and 20 km from Pudukkottai. Bus facilities are available from these places.

== Structure ==
This temple has front mandapa, artha mandapa and Garbhagriha. From the inscriptions of Kulasekara Pandya (1190-1218 CE) and Sundara Pandya (1218-1244 CE) found there it is learnt that this temple might have belonged to more than 800 years. In the vimana of the presiding deity astathikbalakas, guardian deities, facing eight directions are found. In the south Gnanasambandar, Appar, Sundarar and Manikkavacakar, in the west Kannimoola Ganapathi, Veera Ganapathy, Lakshmi Narayana, Visvanathar, Visalakshi, Ayyanar with consorts, Vishnu with consorts, Veerabhadra, Arunagirinathar, Athma Linga, and Gajalakshmi are found. In the north shrine of Chandikesvarar is found. In the north east Navagraha, and in the east Pattinathar are found. In the west prakara Muruga with his consorts is found. In the kosta, Kongana Siddha, Dakshinamurthi, Lingodbhava, Brahma, Durga and Bhikshatana are found.

== Presiding deity ==
As so many Iluppai trees were found here this place was known as ‘Iluppaiyur’ and now called as ‘Iluppur’. The presiding deity, facing east, is known as Hemavritthisvarar and Ponvasinathar. The goddess is in standing posture, facing south, with four hands. Her upper hands hold lotus while lower hands are in abaya and varada postures. In the prakara temple trees Vilva and Makilam are found. Pujas are held four times daily at Kalasanthi (8.00 a.m.), Uttchikkalam (noon 12.00), Sayaratchai (6.00 p.m.) and arthajamam (8.00 p.m.).

== Worshippers ==
Rama and Lakshmana while going in search of Sita they went through this place, which was at that time known as 'Mathu Kavanam' and did Linga puja. As Guru worshipped the presiding deity he was known as Ponvasinathar.

== Festivals ==
The temple is opened for worship from 7.00 to 12.00 noon and 4.00 to 8.00 p.m. During the Tamil month of Chitirai, 10 day Brahmotsavam held. On eighth day celestial wedding of the deities, on the ninth day car festival and on 10th day Tiruvathirai are held. During these days the processional deities would go around the temple. NavaratriPanguni Uthiram are also held in this temple.
