= Regunathapuram, Pudukkottai =

Village in India

Regunathapuram
- Village
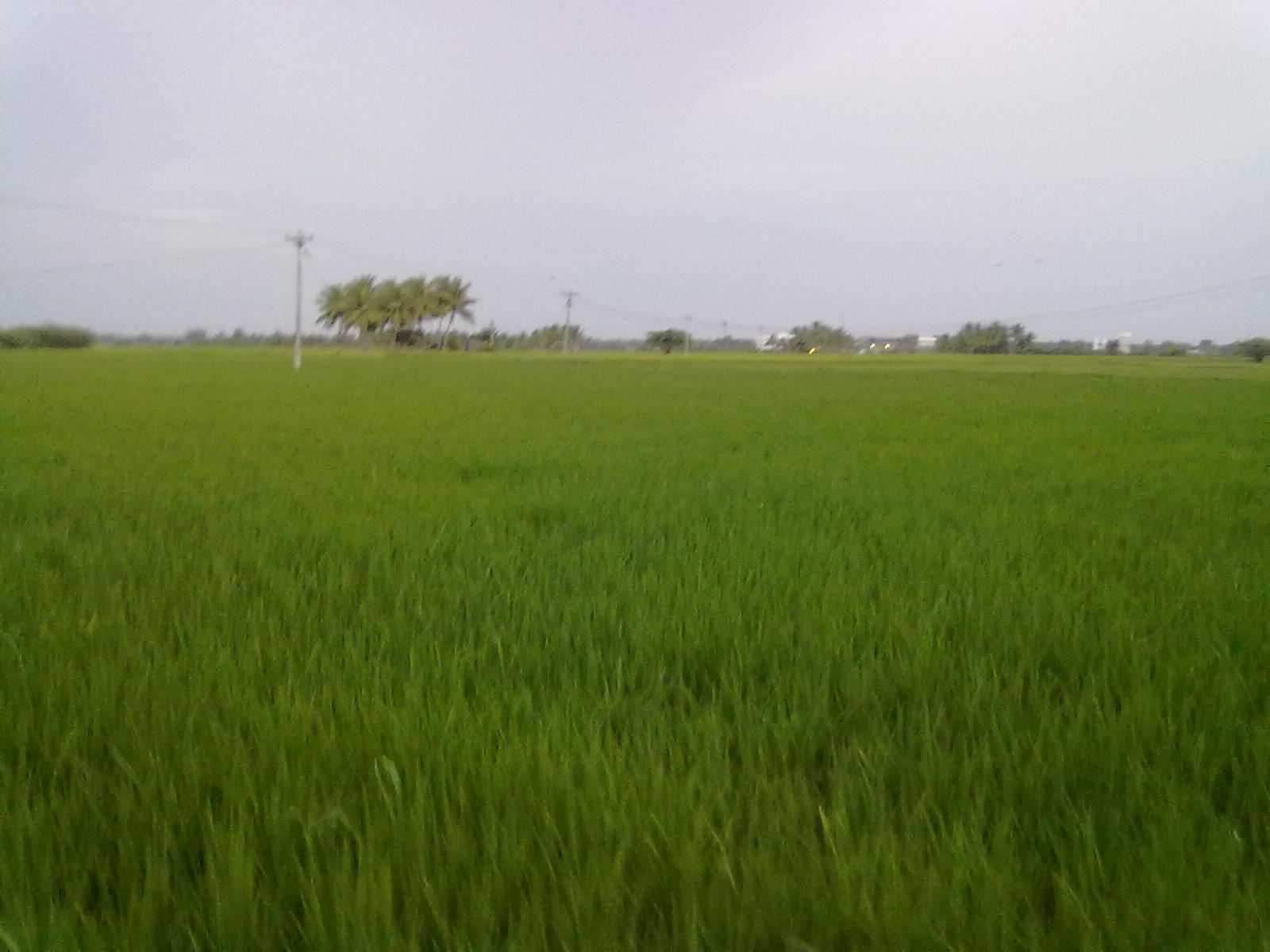
- Paddy field in Regunathapuram

- Location in Tamil Nadu, India Regunathapuram (India)
- Coordinates: 10.55°N 79.10°E
- Country: India
- State: Tamil Nadu
- District: Pudukkottai
- Taluk: Karambakkudi
- Elevation: 79 m (259 ft)

Languages
  - Official: Tamil
- Time zone: UTC+5:30 (IST)
- PIN: 622302
- Telephone code: 04322
- Vehicle registration: TN-55
- Website: www.regunathapuram.com

Regunathapuram is a small village in Karambakkudi taluk, Pudukkottai District in the Indian state of Tamil Nadu. It is situated about 25 kilometres (16 mi) from Thanjavur and 54 kilometres (34 mi) from Pudukkottai.

== Transport ==
Regunathapuram is connected by the road to Thanjavur, Karambakkudi, Pudukkottai. Frequent bus services are available to these places both by private and government carriers.

The nearest railway station is at Thanjavur.

The nearest airport is Tiruchirapalli Airport, which is about 60 kilometres (37 mi) from Regunathapuram.

Thattamanaippatti, Keerathur, Kalleripatti, Pudhuviduthi, Vandanviduthi are some of the closest villages to Regunathapuram.

== Education ==
- Government higher secondary school
- Auxilium College of Arts and Science for Women
- Auxilium College of Education for Women
- Best Catering and Nursing college.

== Health care ==
A primary health center, government hospital, Government Higher Secondary School and a veterinary hospital are situated in Regunathapuram..

== Culture ==
Three major religions (Hinduism, Christianity and Islam) are practiced in Regunathapuram. Regunathapuram has three Hindu Temples, vinayagar temple, balasubramaniyar temle, pataipathira kaliyamman temple, Adaikala Matha Church, St Antony's Church and a Mosque.

The annual feast at Adaikala Matha Church falls on the first Saturday of May every year. The people of Regunathapuram celebrate major festivals such as Pongal, Diwali, Christmas and Ramzan.

== Economy ==
Regunathapuram's economy is based on agriculture, using irrigation from bore wells and reservoirs. The major agriculture products are rice, sugarcane, mango, coconut, blackgram, gingelly, ragi, red gram, green gram and maize.
