= Karambakkudi =

- Town
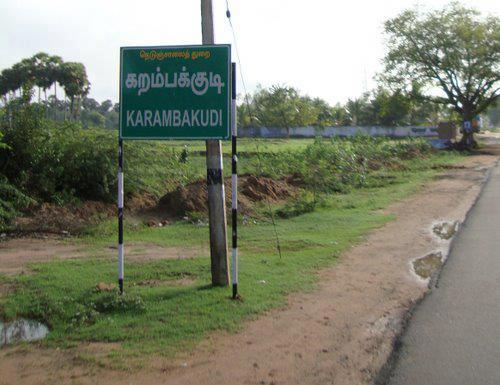
- A road in Karambakkudi
- Nickname: Karambai
- Location in Tamil Nadu, India
- Coordinates: 10.47°N 79.13°E
- Country: India
- State: Tamil Nadu
- District: Pudukkottai

Government
  - Type: Town Panchayat
  - Body: Karambakkudi Taluk
- Elevation: 36 m (118 ft)

Population (2011)
  - Total: 1,000

Languages
  - Official: Tamil
- Time zone: UTC+5:30 (IST)
- PIN: 622302
- Telephone code: 04322
- Vehicle registration: TN55

Karambakkudi is a panchayat town as well as Taluk in Pudukkottai district in the Indian state of Tamil Nadu. Karambakkudi is located about 40 km from Thanjavur and 40 km from Pudukkottai. This town is located on the border of the Thanjavur and Pudukkottai district in Tamil Nadu. The opinion of the people of this area is that this area should become an assembly constituency very soon, Here all higher secondary schools and Art's college is there.This area is covered by Delta Region.

== Demographics ==
According to the 2011 census, the taluk of Karambakudi had a population of 110,612 with 54,685 males and 55,927 females. There were 1023 women for every 1000 men. The taluk had a literacy rate of 66.16. Child population in the age group below 6 was 6,642 Males and 6,124 Females.

=== Religion ===
Three major religions (Hindu, Christianity and Islam) are practiced in Karambakkudi. The major churches, temples and many mosques are there.

== Geography ==
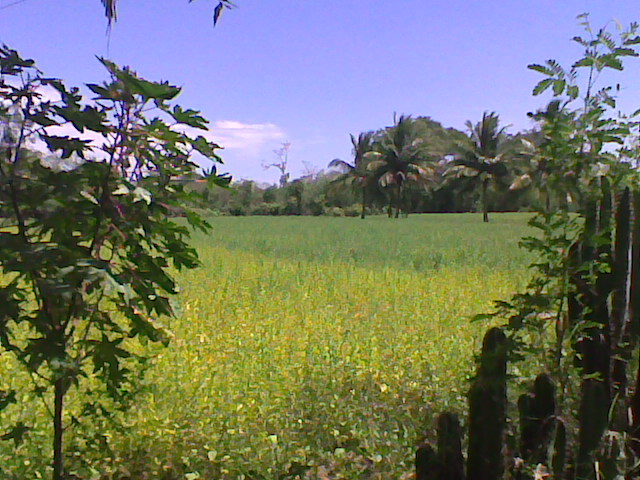
A gingelly field near Karambakkudi

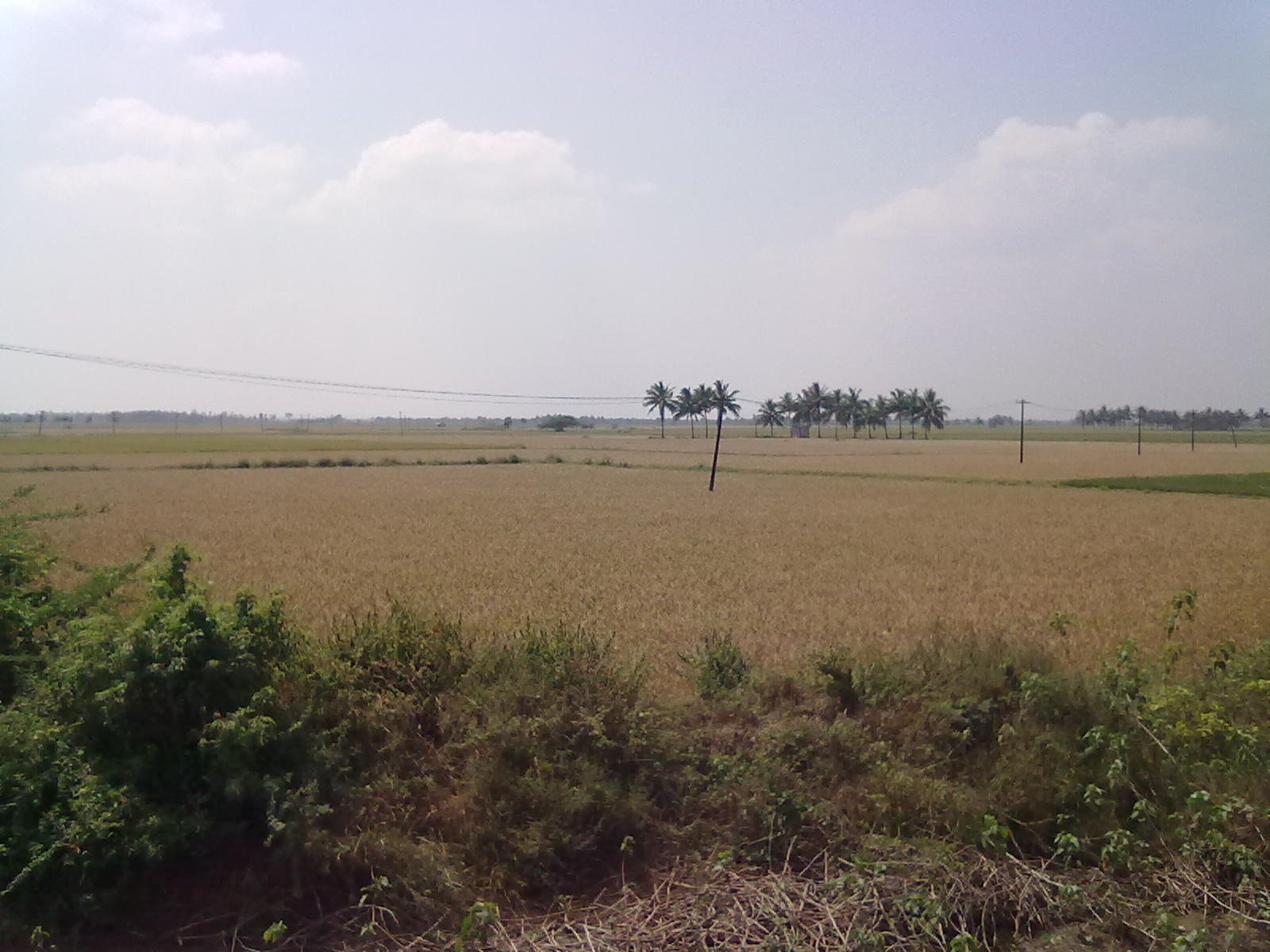
A paddy field near Karambakkudi

This area is in the protected agricultural zone of the Cauvery Delta. Karambakkudi is located at 10.47°N 79.13°E. It has an average elevation of 36 metres (118 feet).

=== Climate ===
The climate of Karambakkudi town is hot and dry. Temperatures range between a maximum of 41 °C and a minimum of 18 °C. April to June are the hottest months and December and January are coldest with temperatures rising towards the end of February. Rainfall occurs mostly during the north-east monsoon in the months of October to December though the town receives little rainfall, averaging 840 mm compared to the district average. The period from November to February in Karambakkudi is pleasant, with a climate full of warm days and cool nights. The area was hit by Hurricane Gaja in 2018, when heavy rains caused severe damage to coconut trees.

== Economy ==
The main source of income is agriculture. Paddy, groundnut and sugarcane are the major crops. Especially paddy income sources from some villages like Regunathapuram, Kulandhiranpattu, Thirumnanjeri, Pudupatti, Theethanviduthi, Ooranipuram, Neyveli, and Idayathi. Many people go abroad and working in Arabic and European countries.

== Transport ==
Karambakkudi is well connected by road to Thanjavur, Pudukkottai, Orathanadu, Pattukottai, Alangudi, Gandarvakottai, Tiruchirapalli, Chennai, Mannargudi, Peravurani, Erode, Karaikkudi and Aranthangi. Non-request bus services are available for these places by both private and public carriers. Karambakkudi had a single bus terminus located at the heart of the town. The nearest railway station is at Thanjavur, about 40 km away. The nearest airport is Tiruchirapalli Airport, about 75 km away.

Private and government transportation is regularly available from Karambakkudi to Chennai at night.

== Education ==
Several schools and colleges are in Karambakkudi. Half of the peoples get their education from government and government-aided schools. There are many equipped private schools in and around the town.

- Panchayat union primary school, Anumarkovil
- Government Boys higher secondary school
- Government Girls higher secondary school
- TELC (Govt Aided) primary school
- Panchayat union primary school (Sengamalam)
- Guthoos Matriculation School
- Mahathma gandhi Nursery & Primary school
- Bright higher secondary school
- Vinayaga Vidyalaya Matriculation School
- Reena Mercy Matriculation school
- Vignesh Computer Education & Typewriting Institute Since 1997 - 2021 (Silver Jubilee)

== Health ==
A Government General Hospital is situated in the heart of the town.
