= Sri Muthumariamman Temple, Pudukkottai =

Coordinates: 53°24′51.75″N 2°57′39.1″W

Sri Muthumariamman Temple (Tamil: ஸ்ரீ முத்துமாரியம்மன் கோவில்) is a famous temple in Pudukkottai District, in the Indian state of Tamil Nadu. It is located at Kothamangalam in Alangudi, Taluk / Tehsil.

== History ==
The Sri Muthumariamman Temple is more than 250 years old and is situated on the hilltop of Kotahena, Pudukottai (Ceylon) and was constructed in 1852 by workers from South India.

Vaikasi Visakam is celebrated as the birthday of Lord Murugan. It is observed during Visakam Nakshatra in the Tamil month of Vaikasi.

== Vaikasi festival ==
Devotees from the nearby villages and from various parts of the state gather in thousands on these days to worship.

Though there are regular Pujas in the temple, a considerable number of devotees visit on Monday and Friday of every week throughout the year.
