= Viralimalai Assembly constituency =

One of the 234 State Legislative Assembly Constituencies in Tamil Nadu, in India

Coordinates: 10°36′6″N 78°32′47″E

Viralimalai
- Constituency No. 179 for the Tamil Nadu Legislative Assembly

Constituency details
- Country: India
- Region: South India
- State: Tamil Nadu
- District: Pudukottai
- Lok Sabha constituency: Karur
- Established: 1967
- Total electors: 2,25,159
- Reservation: None

Member of Legislative Assembly
- 17th Tamil Nadu Legislative Assembly
- Incumbent Vacant

Viralimalai is a legislative assembly constituency of Pudukkottai district in the Indian state of Tamil Nadu. It is one of the 234 State Legislative Assembly Constituencies in Tamil Nadu. It comes under Karur Lok Sabha constituency for Parliamentary elections. Elections and winners from this constituency are listed below.

== Extent ==
- Illupur Taluk (except Komangalam village)
- Kulathur Taluk (part)
- Kumaramangalam, Mathur, Singathakuruchi, Sengalakkudi,
- Mandaiyur, Latchmanapatti, Mettupatti, Sivakamipuram,
- Thennathirayanpatti, Palandampatti, Kalamavur, Neerpalani,
- Amburapatti, Madayanaipatti, Suriyur, Perambur, Alangudi, Vilappatti,
- Vadugappatti, Melappuduvayal, Kolathur, Odukkur and Vemmani villages.
- Manaparai Taulk (part, Triuchirapalli district) Kavinaripatti, Puthakudi and Kappakudi villages.**

[**Although Kavinaripatti, Puthakudi and Kappakudi villages are in Triuchirapalli revenue district, they are physically and geographically located within the boundaries of 179- Viralimalai AC.]

== Members of Legislative Assembly ==
Year	Member	Party
2011	Dr. C. Vijayabaskar	All India Anna Dravida Munnetra Kazhagam
2016	Dr. C. Vijayabaskar	All India Anna Dravida Munnetra Kazhagam
2021	Dr. C. Vijayabaskar	All India Anna Dravida Munnetra Kazhagam
2026	Dr. C. Vijayabaskar	All India Anna Dravida Munnetra Kazhagam

== Election results ==
Vote share of winning candidates
2026	51.87%
2021	52.93%
2016	49.69%
2011	55.99%
1971	57.47%
1967	49.63%

=== 2026 By-election ===
2026 Tamil Nadu Legislative Assembly Bye-election: Viralimalai
Party	Candidate	Votes	%	±%
TVK				
DMK				
AIADMK				
NTK				
Others	Other party candidates			
Independent	Independent candidates			
NOTA	None of the above			
Margin of victory				
Turnout				
Registered electors				
gain from		Swing		

=== 2026 ===
2026 Tamil Nadu Legislative Assembly election: Viralimalai
Party	Candidate	Votes	%	±%
AIADMK	C. Vijayabaskar	105,773	51.87	▼1.06
TVK	Murugesan P.	43,700	21.43	New
DMK	Chellapandiyan.K.K	40,397	19.81	▼20.90
NTK	Sathyalakshmi.K	9,467	4.64	▲1.00
NOTA	NOTA	375	0.18	
Turnout		2,03,921	90.57	▲4.85
Registered electors		2,25,159		▼30
AIADMK hold		Swing	▼1.06	

=== 2021 ===
2021 Tamil Nadu Legislative Assembly election: Viralimalai
Party	Candidate	Votes	%	±%
AIADMK	C. Vijayabaskar	102,179	52.93	+3.24
DMK	Palaniappan	78,581	40.71	−4.03
NTK	P. Azhagu Meena	7,035	3.64	New
AMMK	O. Karthi Prabhakaran	1,228	0.64	New
Margin of victory		23,598	12.22	7.27
Turnout		193,038	85.72	1.56
Rejected ballots		1168	0.61	
Registered electors		225,189		
AIADMK hold		Swing	3.24	

=== 2016 ===
2016 Tamil Nadu Legislative Assembly election: Viralimalai
Party	Candidate	Votes	%	±%
AIADMK	C. Vijayabaskar	84,701	49.69	−6.3
DMK	M. Palaniappan	76,254	44.74	+17.22
DMDK	R. Karthikeyan	2,979	1.75	New
ETMK	N. Adaikalam	1,089	0.64	New
NOTA	NOTA	974	0.57	New
Margin of victory		8,447	4.96	−23.52
Turnout		170,448	84.16	−1.86
Registered electors		202,517		
AIADMK hold		Swing	-6.30	

=== 2011 ===
2011 Tamil Nadu Legislative Assembly election: Viralimalai
Party	Candidate	Votes	%	±%
AIADMK	C. Vijayabaskar	77,285	55.99	New
DMK	S. Regupathy	37,976	27.51	New
Independent	M. Palaniappan	15,397	11.16	New
IJK	Y. Savarimuthu	2,639	1.91	New
Independent	P. Alagu	1,404	1.02	New
Independent	P. Raja	1,403	1.02	New
Independent	Palaniappan (A) M. Puratchikavidasan	1,144	0.83	New
Independent	M. Ramesh	774	0.56	New
Margin of victory		39,309	28.48	
Turnout		138,022	86.02	
Registered electors		160,449		
AIADMK win (new seat)				

=== 1971 ===
1971 Tamil Nadu Legislative Assembly election: Viralimalai
Party	Candidate	Votes	%	±%
DMK	V. S. Ilechezhiyan	41,813	57.47	+7.83
INC	A. Karuppiah Udayar	30,274	41.61	−1.58
Independent	A. Perumal	670	0.92	New
Margin of victory		11,539	15.86	9.41
Turnout		72,757	75.11	3.97
Registered electors		100,230		
DMK hold		Swing	7.83	

=== 1967 ===
1967 Madras Legislative Assembly election: Viralimalai
Party	Candidate	Votes	%	±%
DMK	V. S. Shanmugam	30,288	49.63	New
INC	P. P. Gounder	26,354	43.19	New
Independent	A. Perumal	2,054	3.37	New
Independent	M. C. Gounder	1,539	2.52	New
Independent	A. M. Ali	787	1.29	New
Margin of victory		3,934	6.45	
Turnout		61,022	71.13	
Registered electors		90,479		
DMK win (new seat)				
