= C. Vijayabaskar =

Indian politician (born 1974)

Minister for Health and Family Welfare, Government of Tamil Nadu
- In office 1 November 2013 – 7 May 2021
- Governor: Konijeti Rosaiah; C. Vidyasagar Rao (Additional charge); Banwarilal Purohit
- Chief Minister: J. Jayalalithaa; O. Panneerselvam; J. Jayalalithaa; O. Panneerselvam; Edappadi K. Palaniswami
- Preceded by: K. C. Veeramani
- Succeeded by: M. Subramaniam

Member of the Tamil Nadu Legislative Assembly
- In office 16 May 2011 – 16 June 2026
- Preceded by: Constituency created
- Constituency: Viralimalai
- In office 14 May 2001 – 12 May 2006
- Preceded by: P. Mari Ayya
- Succeeded by: R. Nedunchezhian
- Constituency: Pudukottai

Personal details
- Born: 8 April 1974 (age 52) Iluppur, Pudukkottai, Tamil Nadu
- Party: Tamilaga Vettri Kazhagam (Since July 2 2026)
- Other political affiliations: All India Anna Dravida Munnetra Kazhagam(Before 2 July 2026)
- Spouse: Ramya
- Children: 2 Daughters
- Education: MBBS
- Profession: Physician; Politician
- Website: drcvijayabaskar.com

Chinnathambi Vijayabaskar (or Vijayabasker; born 8 April 1974) is an Indian physician and politician from the All India Anna Dravida Munnetra Kazhagam Party (AIADMK), and the Health minister of Tamil Nadu from 2013 to 2021. He is a member of the Tamil Nadu Legislative Assembly for the Viralimalai constituency, from where he won elections in 2011, 2016, 2021 and 2026. He was previously elected from Pudukkottai constituency in 2001.

He has resigned him MLA seat following the 2026 Tamil Nadu Assembly Election in Viralimalai Constitutency. On 2 July 2026, he joined Tamilaga Vettri Kazhagam.

== Personal life ==
C. Vijayabaskar was born on 8 April 1974 at Iluppur, Pudukkottai, Tamil Nadu to R. Chinnathambi Mazhavarayar. He completed his formal education from Rajah Muthiah Medical College and Hospital (RMMCH), Chidambaram. He is married to Ramya and the couple have two children.

== Controversies ==
Alleged obstruction of officials conducting an income tax raid at Vijayabhaskar's house in April 2017 led to First Information Reports being filed against his fellow ministers, R. Kamaraj and Udumalai K. Radhakrishnan, but were cancelled due to lack of evidence. He faced further investigation by the Central Bureau of Investigation in 2018, which again was pending for a very long time due to lack of solid prima facie evidence and is rumored to be false information.

C. Vijayabaskar was the health minister of state in April 2017 when income tax raid discovered evident documents revealing the AIADMK party's intention to offer a sum of Rs 89 crore to "bribe" voters during the byelection for Chennai's RK Nagar assembly constituency, with an individual rate of Rs 4,000 per voter.

The Directorate of Vigilance and Anti-Corruption (DVAC) has filed a case against Vijayabhaskar, accusing him of illegally acquiring disproportionate assets worth Rs 27 crore during his five-year tenure in the 2016–2021 Tamil Nadu government led by the AIADMK. The DVAC registered a case against him and has also named his wife, and further searches were carried out at multiple properties allegedly owned by he and his family on 18 October 2021.

== Electoral performance ==
=== Tamil Nadu Legislative Assembly Elections ===
Elections	Constituency	Party	Result	Vote percentage	Opposition Candidate	Opposition Party	Opposition vote percentage
2001 Tamil Nadu Legislative Assembly election	Pudukkottai	AIADMK	Won	53.96	Periyannan Arasu	DMK	34.37
2011 Tamil Nadu Legislative Assembly election	Viralimalai	AIADMK	Won	55.99	S. Regupathy	DMK	27.51
2016 Tamil Nadu Legislative Assembly election	Viralimalai	AIADMK	Won	49.69	M. Palaniappan	DMK	44.74
2021 Tamil Nadu Legislative Assembly election	Viralimalai	AIADMK	Won	52.93	Palaniappan	DMK	40.71
2026 Tamil Nadu Legislative Assembly election	Viralimalai	AIADMK	Won	51.87	Murugesan P.	TVK	21.43
