= N. Sundarraj =

Indian politician

N. Sundarraj நா.சுந்தர்ராஜ்

Personal details
- Born: 31 January 1934 Kattuppatty, Pudukkottai district, Tamil Nadu.
- Died: 23 September 1994 (aged 50)
- Party: Indian National Congress
- Spouse: Retinam
- Children: Radha, RAJAH SUNDHARARAJ

N. Sundararaj (Tamil: நா.சுந்தர்ராஜ்)was an Indian politician and Member of Parliament for Lok Sabha from Pudukkottai, Tamil Nadu.

== Career ==
He was elected 3 times (8th Lok Sabha (1984–89), 9th Lok Sabha (1989–91), 10th Lok Sabha (1991–94)) and Member of the Legislative Assembly of Thirumayam (Tamil Nadu)two times. He was elected to the Tamil Nadu legislative assembly as an Indian National Congress candidate for the Tirumayam constituency in the 1977 election and also in the Indian National Congress (Indira) 1980 election.

He won the second highest vote difference in India next to Rajiv Ratna Gandhi.

== Electoral victories ==
=== Indian Parliament ===
Year	Voters In 1000	Voter turnout (% age)	Candidate name	Party
1991	748.19	71.4	Sundararaj N.	INC
1989	787.85	74.73	Sundararaj N.	INC
1984	653.87	81.05	Sundararaj N.	INC

=== Tamil Nadu state assembly ===
Year	Winning candidate	Party
1977	N. Sundarraj	Indian National Congress
1980	N. Sundarraj	Indian National Congress (Indira)
