= Pudukkottai Assembly constituency =

One of the 234 State Legislative Assembly Constituencies in Tamil Nadu, in India

Coordinates: 10.38°N 78.82°E

Pudukkottai
- Constituency No. 180 for the Tamil Nadu Legislative Assembly

Constituency details
- Country: India
- Region: South India
- State: Tamil Nadu
- District: Pudukottai
- Lok Sabha constituency: Tiruchirappalli
- Established: 1951
- Total electors: 2,26,009
- Reservation: None

Member of Legislative Assembly
- 17th Tamil Nadu Legislative Assembly
- Incumbent V. Muthuraja
- Party: DMK
- Elected year: 2026

Pudukottai is a state assembly constituency in Tamil Nadu. Elections and winners in the constituency are listed below. An election was not held in year 1957. It comes under Tiruchirappalli Lok Sabha constituency for Parliament elections. It is one of the 234 State Legislative Assembly Constituencies in Tamil Nadu, in India.

== Members of Legislative Assembly ==
=== Madras State ===
| Year | Winner | Party |
|---|---|---|
| 1952 | Balakrishnan | Tamil Nadu Toilers' Party |
| 1962 | A. Thiagarajan | Dravida Munnetra Kazhagam |
| 1967 | Rajakumar Vijaya Raghunatha Thondaiman | Indian National Congress |

=== Tamil Nadu ===
| Year | Winner | Party |
|---|---|---|
| 1971 | M. Sathiyamurthy | Indian National Congress |
| 1977 | Rajakumar Vijaya Raghunatha Thondaiman | Indian National Congress |
| 1980 | Rajakumar Vijaya Raghunatha Thondaiman | Indian National Congress (I) |
| 1984 | J. Mohammad Gani | Indian National Congress |
| 1989 | A. Periannan | Dravida Munnetra Kazhagam |
| 1991 | C. Swaminathan | Indian National Congress |
| 1996 | A. Periannan | Dravida Munnetra Kazhagam |
| 1997^ | P. Mari Ayya | Dravida Munnetra Kazhagam |
| 2001 | Dr. C. Vijayabaskar | All India Anna Dravida Munnetra Kazhagam |
| 2006 | R. Nedunchezhiyan | All India Anna Dravida Munnetra Kazhagam |
| 2011 | S. P. Muthukumaran | Communist Party of India |
| 2012^ | V. R. Karthik Thondaiman | All India Anna Dravida Munnetra Kazhagam |
| 2016 | Periyannan Arasu | Dravida Munnetra Kazhagam |
| 2021 | V. Muthuraja | Dravida Munnetra Kazhagam |
| 2026 | V. Muthuraja | Dravida Munnetra Kazhagam |

- By-elections were held on the account of vacancy due to the demise of the sitting MLA.

== Election results ==
Vote share of winning candidates
| 2026 | 35.10% |
| 2021 | 47.70% |
| 2016 | 39.19% |
| 2012 by-election | 71.16% |
| 2011 | 46.78% |
| 2006 | 42.18% |
| 2001 | 53.96% |
| 1996 | 56.66% |
| 1991 | 66.44% |
| 1989 | 36.24% |
| 1984 | 62.37% |
| 1980 | 49.71% |
| 1977 | 42.74% |
| 1971 | 46.80% |
| 1967 | 62.07% |
| 1962 | 64.97% |
| 1952 | 52.53% |

=== 2026 ===
2026 Tamil Nadu Legislative Assembly election: Pudukkottai
| Party | Candidate | Votes | % | ±% |
|---|---|---|---|---|
| DMK | V. Muthuraja | 66,825 | 35.10 | ▼12.60 |
| TVK | K. M. Shariff | 64,958 | 34.12 | New |
| BJP | N. Ramachandran | 41,089 | 21.58 | New |
| NTK | Ezhilarasi Vijayendran | 11,673 | 6.13 | ▼0.26 |
| Independent | K. Kailasakumar | 669 | 0.35 | New |
| Party For The Rights Of Other Backward Classes | E. Ramalingam | 510 | 0.27 | New |
| NOTA | None of the above | 467 | 0.25 | |
| Independent | Senthilnathan.B | 466 | 0.24 | New |
| TVK | S. Niyaz Ahamed | 372 | 0.20 | New |
| Independent | S. Selvaraj | 351 | 0.18 | New |
| Independent | G. Duraisaravanan | 324 | 0.17 | New |
| Independent | C. Govindasamy | 239 | 0.13 | New |
| Independent | C. Karuppaiah | 233 | 0.12 | New |
| Independent | A. Subaresh Raja | 232 | 0.12 | New |
| Independent | Kangatharan.P | 210 | 0.11 | New |
| Independent | D. Ramesh | 193 | 0.10 | New |
| Independent | R. Sivakumar | 192 | 0.10 | New |
| Independent | R. Ramachandran | 190 | 0.10 | New |
| Independent | V.R. Jayakumar | 129 | 0.07 | New |
| Independent | Ramachandran.C | 128 | 0.07 | New |
| PT | K. Rengan | 122 | 0.06 | New |
| Independent | C. Karuppaiah | 112 | 0.06 | New |
| Independent | K. Dhanagopal | 102 | 0.05 | New |
| CPI(ML)L | G. Manimegalai | 100 | 0.05 | New |
| Independent | C. Ramachandran | 89 | 0.05 | New |
| Independent | M. A. Muthukumar | 83 | 0.04 | New |
| Independent | G. Arivazhagan | 81 | 0.04 | New |
| Veerath Thiyagi Viswanathadoss Thozhilalarkal Katchi | A. Rajasekar | 74 | 0.04 | New |
| Independent | K. Murugesan | 64 | 0.03 | New |
| Independent | G. Muthuraj | 62 | 0.03 | New |
| Independent | A. Radhakrishnan | 39 | 0.02 | New |
| Margin of victory | | 1,867 | 0.98 | ▼6.25 |
| Turnout | | 1,90,378 | 84.23 | ▲10.51 |
| Registered electors | | 2,26,009 | | ▼18,020 |
| DMK hold | | Swing | ▼12.60 | |

=== 2021 ===
2021 Tamil Nadu Legislative Assembly election: Pudukkottai
| Party | Candidate | Votes | % | ±% |
|---|---|---|---|---|
| DMK | V. Muthuraja | 85,802 | 47.70% | +8.5 |
| AIADMK | V. R. Karthik Thondaiman | 72,801 | 40.47% | +2.5 |
| NTK | Sasikumar | 11,503 | 6.39% | +5.44 |
| MNM | S. Moorthy | 3,948 | 2.19% | New |
| DMDK | M. Subramanian | 1,873 | 1.04% | −3.55 |
| Margin of victory | | 13,001 | 7.23% | 6.00% |
| Turnout | | 179,892 | 73.72% | −1.03% |
| Rejected ballots | | 114 | 0.06% | |
| Registered electors | | 244,029 | | |
| DMK hold | | Swing | 8.50% | |

=== 2016 ===
2016 Tamil Nadu Legislative Assembly election: Pudukkottai
| Party | Candidate | Votes | % | ±% |
|---|---|---|---|---|
| DMK | Periyannan Arassu | 66,739 | 39.19% | −5.37 |
| AIADMK | V. R. Karthik Thondaiman | 64,655 | 37.97% | New |
| Independent | M. Chokkalingam | 22,973 | 13.49% | New |
| DMDK | Jahir Hussain | 7,810 | 4.59% | New |
| NOTA | NOTA | 1,637 | 0.96% | New |
| NTK | M. Arunmozhichozhan | 1,625 | 0.95% | New |
| IJK | G. Kumar | 1,061 | 0.62% | New |
| Independent | A. Radhakrishnan | 913 | 0.54% | New |
| Margin of victory | | 2,084 | 1.22% | −0.99% |
| Turnout | | 170,282 | 74.75% | −4.14% |
| Registered electors | | 227,802 | | |
| DMK gain from AIADMK | | Swing | -7.58% | |

=== 2012 by-election ===
Bye-election, 2012: Pudukkottai
| Party | Candidate | Votes | % | ±% |
|---|---|---|---|---|
| AIADMK | V. R. Karthik Thondaiman | 0 | 0 | |
| DMDK | Jahir Hussain. N. | 40000 | 88.28 | |
| IJK | Srinivasan N | 4,495 | 3.14 | |
| MNMK | Arivalagan | 1,370 | 0.96 | |
| Majority | | 71,498 | 49.88 | |
| Turnout | | 1,43,346 | 73.49 | |
| AIADMK gain from CPI | | Swing | | |

=== 2011 ===
2011 Tamil Nadu Legislative Assembly election: Pudukkottai
| Party | Candidate | Votes | % | ±% |
|---|---|---|---|---|
| CPI | S. P. Muthukumaran | 65,466 | 46.78% | New |
| DMK | Periyannan Arassu | 62,365 | 44.56% | +3.66 |
| IJK | N. Srinivasan | 4,098 | 2.93% | New |
| Independent | V. Bharathan | 3,901 | 2.79% | New |
| BJP | Pala. Selvam | 1,748 | 1.25% | −7.64 |
| Independent | C. Ravi | 832 | 0.59% | New |
| Independent | T. Sevanthilingam | 750 | 0.54% | New |
| Margin of victory | | 3,101 | 2.22% | 0.94% |
| Turnout | | 139,957 | 78.89% | 3.40% |
| Registered electors | | 177,413 | | |
| CPI gain from AIADMK | | Swing | 4.60% | |

=== 2006 ===
2006 Tamil Nadu Legislative Assembly election: Pudukkottai
| Party | Candidate | Votes | % | ±% |
|---|---|---|---|---|
| AIADMK | R. Nedunchezhian | 64,319 | 42.18% | −11.78 |
| DMK | M. Jaffarali | 62,369 | 40.90% | +6.53 |
| BJP | Durai Dhiviyanathan | 13,559 | 8.89% | New |
| DMDK | S. Javaheer | 6,880 | 4.51% | New |
| TNJC | M. Arumugam | 837 | 0.55% | New |
| Independent | P. Vijayakumar | 811 | 0.53% | New |
| Independent | A. Vetriselvam | 770 | 0.50% | New |
| Margin of victory | | 1,950 | 1.28% | −18.31% |
| Turnout | | 152,502 | 75.49% | 10.67% |
| Registered electors | | 202,027 | | |
| AIADMK hold | | Swing | -11.78% | |

=== 2001 ===
2001 Tamil Nadu Legislative Assembly election: Pudukkottai
| Party | Candidate | Votes | % | ±% |
|---|---|---|---|---|
| AIADMK | Dr. C. Vijayabaskar | 77,627 | 53.96% | New |
| DMK | Periyannan Arasu | 49,444 | 34.37% | −22.29 |
| MDMK | K. Kaliyamoorthy | 10,702 | 7.44% | −2.69 |
| CPI(ML)L | Kasi Viduthalaikkumaran | 2,199 | 1.53% | New |
| Independent | S. Vijayabaskar | 1,435 | 1.00% | New |
| Independent | M. Palanisamy | 960 | 0.67% | New |
| Margin of victory | | 28,183 | 19.59% | −11.01% |
| Turnout | | 143,864 | 64.82% | −8.50% |
| Registered electors | | 221,966 | | |
| AIADMK gain from DMK | | Swing | -2.70% | |

=== 1996 ===
1996 Tamil Nadu Legislative Assembly election: Pudukkottai
| Party | Candidate | Votes | % | ±% |
|---|---|---|---|---|
| DMK | A. Periannan | 79,205 | 56.66% | +25.29 |
| INC | S. C. Swaminathan | 36,422 | 26.05% | −40.39 |
| MDMK | V. N. Mani | 14,165 | 10.13% | New |
| PMK | K. Shariff | 2,244 | 1.61% | New |
| Independent | K. R. Subbiah | 2,234 | 1.60% | New |
| BJP | P. Ravi | 1,348 | 0.96% | New |
| Independent | P. Balakrishnan | 978 | 0.70% | New |
| Margin of victory | | 42,783 | 30.60% | −4.47% |
| Turnout | | 139,794 | 73.31% | 4.44% |
| Registered electors | | 199,005 | | |
| DMK gain from INC | | Swing | -9.78% | |

=== 1991 ===
1991 Tamil Nadu Legislative Assembly election: Pudukkottai
| Party | Candidate | Votes | % | ±% |
|---|---|---|---|---|
| INC | C. Swaminathan | 82,205 | 66.44% | +46.91 |
| DMK | V. N. Mani | 38,806 | 31.36% | −4.87 |
| Margin of victory | | 43,399 | 35.08% | 19.73% |
| Turnout | | 123,728 | 68.87% | −9.84% |
| Registered electors | | 183,488 | | |
| INC gain from DMK | | Swing | 30.20% | |

=== 1989 ===
1989 Tamil Nadu Legislative Assembly election: Pudukkottai
| Party | Candidate | Votes | % | ±% |
|---|---|---|---|---|
| DMK | A. Periannan | 45,534 | 36.24% | New |
| AIADMK | Erama Veerappan | 26,254 | 20.89% | New |
| AIADMK | S. Chellathurai | 25,703 | 20.45% | New |
| INC | J. Mohamed Gani | 24,536 | 19.53% | −42.84 |
| Independent | K. Saminathan | 1,836 | 1.46% | New |
| Margin of victory | | 19,280 | 15.34% | −21.43% |
| Turnout | | 125,661 | 78.71% | 0.52% |
| Registered electors | | 162,152 | | |
| DMK gain from INC | | Swing | -26.13% | |

=== 1984 ===
1984 Tamil Nadu Legislative Assembly election: Pudukkottai
| Party | Candidate | Votes | % | ±% |
|---|---|---|---|---|
| INC | J. Mohamed Gani | 63,877 | 62.37% | +12.66 |
| CPI | K. R. Subbiah | 26,214 | 25.60% | −22.79 |
| INC(J) | S. Chelladhuri | 7,354 | 7.18% | New |
| Independent | A. Sundaravel Udayar | 3,018 | 2.95% | New |
| Independent | R. Samiaiah Kadavarar | 1,023 | 1.00% | New |
| Independent | M. Lakshmanan | 690 | 0.67% | New |
| Margin of victory | | 37,663 | 36.77% | 35.45% |
| Turnout | | 102,418 | 78.19% | 4.12% |
| Registered electors | | 137,340 | | |
| INC hold | | Swing | 12.66% | |

=== 1980 ===
1980 Tamil Nadu Legislative Assembly election: Pudukkottai
| Party | Candidate | Votes | % | ±% |
|---|---|---|---|---|
| INC | Rajakumar Vijaya Raghunatha Thondaiman | 47,660 | 49.71% | +6.97 |
| CPI | K. R. Subbiah | 46,387 | 48.38% | New |
| Independent | R. Chidambaram | 708 | 0.74% | New |
| Independent | V. Kuttayan | 700 | 0.73% | New |
| Margin of victory | | 1,273 | 1.33% | −18.69% |
| Turnout | | 95,877 | 74.07% | 5.25% |
| Registered electors | | 130,814 | | |
| INC hold | | Swing | 6.97% | |

=== 1977 ===
1977 Tamil Nadu Legislative Assembly election: Pudukkottai
| Party | Candidate | Votes | % | ±% |
|---|---|---|---|---|
| INC | Rajakumar Vijaya Raghunatha Thondaiman | 36,406 | 42.74% | −4.07 |
| AIADMK | C. Anbarasan | 19,352 | 22.72% | New |
| DMK | K. Chindambaram | 19,217 | 22.56% | New |
| JP | A. Karuppiah Udayar | 8,175 | 9.60% | New |
| Independent | J. Muthukrishnan | 1,103 | 1.29% | New |
| Independent | M. Uthrapathy | 937 | 1.10% | New |
| Margin of victory | | 17,054 | 20.02% | 18.28% |
| Turnout | | 85,190 | 68.82% | −7.19% |
| Registered electors | | 125,055 | | |
| INC hold | | Swing | -4.07% | |

=== 1971 ===
1971 Tamil Nadu Legislative Assembly election: Pudukkottai
| Party | Candidate | Votes | % | ±% |
|---|---|---|---|---|
| INC | M. Sathiamoorthy | 34,680 | 46.80% | −15.26 |
| CPI | K. R. Subbaiah | 33,393 | 45.07% | +41.7 |
| Independent | D. Jeyaraj | 4,996 | 6.74% | New |
| Independent | R. Chidambaram | 1,026 | 1.38% | New |
| Margin of victory | | 1,287 | 1.74% | −25.76% |
| Turnout | | 74,095 | 76.01% | −7.03% |
| Registered electors | | 103,655 | | |
| INC hold | | Swing | -15.26% | |

=== 1967 ===
1967 Madras Legislative Assembly election: Pudukkottai
| Party | Candidate | Votes | % | ±% |
|---|---|---|---|---|
| INC | Rajakumar Vijaya Raghunatha Thondaiman | 45,342 | 62.07% | +27.04 |
| DMK | Thiagarajan | 25,255 | 34.57% | −30.4 |
| CPI | Rengasamy | 2,458 | 3.36% | New |
| Margin of victory | | 20,087 | 27.50% | −2.45% |
| Turnout | | 73,055 | 83.03% | 16.20% |
| Registered electors | | 91,205 | | |
| INC gain from DMK | | Swing | -2.91% | |

=== 1962 ===
1962 Madras Legislative Assembly election: Pudukkottai
| Party | Candidate | Votes | % | ±% |
|---|---|---|---|---|
| DMK | A. Thiagarajan | 37,563 | 64.97% | New |
| INC | V. Arunachala Thevar | 20,252 | 35.03% | New |
| Margin of victory | | 17,311 | 29.94% | |
| Turnout | | 57,815 | 66.83% | |
| Registered electors | | 90,173 | | |
| DMK win (new seat) | | | | |

=== 1952 ===
1952 Madras Legislative Assembly election: Pudukkottai
| Party | Candidate | Votes | % | ±% |
|---|---|---|---|---|
| TTP | Balakrishnan | 22,954 | 52.53% | New |
| INC | Natesan Ambalakarar | 12,756 | 29.19% | New |
| Independent | Sivaswami Servai | 4,364 | 9.99% | New |
| Independent | Palaniyandi | 2,375 | 5.43% | New |
| Independent | T. R. Vythianatha Ayyar | 1,250 | 2.86% | New |
| Margin of victory | | 10,198 | 23.34% | |
| Turnout | | 43,699 | 53.68% | |
| Registered electors | | 81,414 | | |
| TTP win (new seat) | | | | |
