= A. Thiagarajan =

Indian politician

Member of the Madras State Assembly
- In office 1962–1967
- Preceded by: V. Arunachala Thevar
- Constituency: Pudukkottai

Member of the Madras State Assembly
- In office 1971–1976
- Preceded by: P. R. Ramanathan
- Constituency: Thirumayam

Personal details
- Party: Dravida Munnetra Kazhagam

A. Thiagarajan is an Indian politician and former Member of the Legislative Assembly of Tamil Nadu. He was elected to the Tamil Nadu legislative assembly as a Dravida Munnetra Kazhagam candidate from Pudukottai constituency in the 1962 election and Tirumayam constituency in the 1971 election.
