= V. Chinniah =

Indian politician

V. Chinniah, also spelled V. Chinnaiah, is an Indian politician and was a Member of the Legislative Assembly of Tamil Nadu. He was elected to the Tamil Nadu legislative assembly as a Tamil Maanila Congress (TMC) candidate from Thirumayam constituency in the 1996 election.
