= Karambakkudi taluk =

Karambakkudi taluk is a taluk of Pudukkottai district of the Indian state of Tamil Nadu

== Demographics ==
According to the 2011 census, the taluk of Karambakudi had a population of 110,612 with 54,685 males and 55,927 females. There were 1023 women for every 1000 men. The taluk had a literacy rate of 66.16. Child population in the age group below 6 was 6,642 Males and 6,124 Females.
