= Karambakudi block =

Karambakudi block is a revenue block in Pudukkottai district, Tamil Nadu, India. It has 39 panchayat villages.

== Villages of Karambakudi Block ==
1. karumali street
2. Athiranviduthi
3. Bandhuvakottai
4. Elaikadividuthi
5. Kalabam
6. Kaliyaranviduthi
7. Kannakkankadu
8. Karambaviduthi
9. Karu.keelatheru
10. Karu.therkkutheru
11. Karuppattipatti
12. Kattathi
13. Keerathur
14. Kulanthiranpattu
15. M.therkkutheru
16. Mailakonepatti
17. Malaiyur, Pudukkottai
18. Mankottai
19. Maruthakoneviduthi
20. Mudhalipatti
21. Mullankuruchi
22. Odappaviduthi
23. Pallavarayanpathai
24. Pappapatti
25. Pattathikkadu
26. Pilaviduthi
27. Ponnanviduthi
28. Puduviduthi
29. Rangiyanviduthi
30. Regunathapuram
31. Sengamedu
32. Theethanipatti
33. Theethanviduthi
34. Thirumanancheri
35. Vadatheru
36. Valankondanviduthi
37. Vandanviduthi
38. Vannakkankadu
39. Vellalaviduthi
40. Pattamaviduthi
