= Tirumayam Assembly constituency =

One of the 234 State Legislative Assembly Constituencies in Tamil Nadu, in India

Coordinates: 10.25°N 78.75°E

Thirumayam
- Constituency No. 181 for the Tamil Nadu Legislative Assembly

Constituency details
- Country: India
- Region: South India
- State: Tamil Nadu
- District: Pudukottai
- Lok Sabha constituency: Sivaganga
- Established: 1951
- Total electors: 2,20,622
- Reservation: None

Member of Legislative Assembly
- 17th Tamil Nadu Legislative Assembly
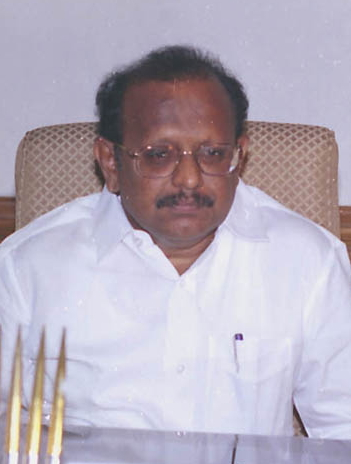
- Incumbent S. Regupathy
- Party: DMK
- Alliance: SPA
- Elected year: 2026

Tirumayam is a state assembly constituency in Pudukkottai district in Tamil Nadu. It is one of the 234 State Legislative Assembly Constituencies in Tamil Nadu, in India. Elections and winners in the constituency are listed below.

== Members of Legislative Assembly ==
=== Madras State ===
Year	Winner	Party
1952	Chinnaya and Palaniappan	TTP and Indian National Congress
1957	V. Ramaiah	Indian National Congress
1962	V. Ramaiah	Indian National Congress
1967	Ponnambalam	Dravida Munnetra Kazhagam

=== Tamil Nadu ===
Year	Winner	Party
1971	A. Thiagarajan	Dravida Munnetra Kazhagam
1977	N. Sundarraj	Indian National Congress
1980	N. Sundarraj	Indian National Congress (I)
1984	T. Pushparaj	Indian National Congress
1989	Alavayal V. Subbaiah	Dravida Munnetra Kazhagam
1991	S. Regupathy	All India Anna Dravida Munnetra Kazhagam
1996	V. Chinniah	Tamil Maanila Congress
2001	M. Radhakrishnan	All India Anna Dravida Munnetra Kazhagam
2006	R. M. Subburam	Indian National Congress
2011	P. K. Vairamuthu	All India Anna Dravida Munnetra Kazhagam
2016	S. Regupathy	Dravida Munnetra Kazhagam
2021	S. Regupathy	Dravida Munnetra Kazhagam
2026	S. Regupathy	Dravida Munnetra Kazhagam

== Election results ==
Vote share of winning candidates
2026	31.87%
2021	41.13%
2016	45.58%
2011	58.27%
2006	40.14%
2001	51.56%
1996	47.35%
1991	70.38%
1989	30.29%
1984	69.42%
1980	45.72%
1977	25.92%
1971	53.20%
1967	62.79%
1962	43.58%
1957	55.83%
1952	24.58%

=== 2026 ===
2026 Tamil Nadu Legislative Assembly election: Thirumayam
Party	Candidate	Votes	%	±%
DMK	Regupathy.S	58,201	31.87	▼9.26
TVK	Chinthamani.C	56,709	31.05	New
AIADMK	Vairamuthu.PK	55,464	30.37	▼9.97
NTK	Lakshmi Srinivasan	9,102	4.98	▼1.40
NOTA	NOTA	945	0.52	
PT	Subbiah.A	359	0.20	New
Independent	Durairajan.M	289	0.16	New
Independent	Ramnath.T	287	0.16	New
Independent	Subramanian.P	279	0.15	New
Independent	Eswar.S	238	0.13	New
Party For The Rights Of Other Backward Classes	Muthukaruppan.CN	228	0.12	New
Independent	Chinnathambi.P	193	0.11	New
All India Puratchi Thalaivar Makkal Munnetra Kazhagam	Raja.K	135	0.07	New
TVK	Ramsingh.SK	97	0.05	New
Independent	Sathishkumar.M	86	0.05	New
Margin of victory		1,492	0.82	▲0.02
Turnout		1,82,612	82.77	▲6.63
Registered electors		2,20,622		▼7,207
DMK hold		Swing	▼9.26	

=== 2021 ===
2021 Tamil Nadu Legislative Assembly election: Thirumayam
Party	Candidate	Votes	%	±%
DMK	S. Regupathy	71,349	41.13%	−4.45
AIADMK	P. K. Vairamuthu	69,967	40.34%	−4.77
Independent	K. Selvakumar	15,144	8.73%	New
NTK	U. Sivaraman	11,061	6.38%	+4.91
AMMK	S. Muniaraju	1,503	0.87%	New
MNM	R. Thirumeni	1,356	0.78%	New
Margin of victory		1,382	0.80%	0.31%
Turnout		173,462	76.14%	−0.08%
Rejected ballots		50	0.03%	
Registered electors		227,829		
DMK hold		Swing	-4.45%	

=== 2016 ===
2016 Tamil Nadu Legislative Assembly election: Thirumayam
Party	Candidate	Votes	%	±%
DMK	S. Regupathy	72,373	45.58%	New
AIADMK	P. K. Vairamuthu	71,607	45.10%	−13.17
TMC(M)	Pl. A. Chidambaram	5,096	3.21%	New
NTK	M. Kanakarethinam	2,323	1.46%	New
BJP	P. Vadamalai	2,262	1.42%	−0.56
NOTA	NOTA	2,114	1.33%	New
PMK	A. Suresh	950	0.60%	New
Margin of victory		766	0.48%	−22.51%
Turnout		158,768	76.22%	−2.52%
Registered electors		208,304		
DMK gain from AIADMK		Swing	-12.68%	

=== 2011 ===
2011 Tamil Nadu Legislative Assembly election: Thirumayam
Party	Candidate	Votes	%	±%
AIADMK	P. K. Vairamuthu	78,913	58.27%	+18.4
INC	Rm. Subburam	47,778	35.28%	−4.86
BJP	P. Vadamalai	2,686	1.98%	−6.91
Independent	R. Ilango	1,457	1.08%	New
Independent	A. Radhakrishnan	1,046	0.77%	New
BSP	S. Sanjai Gandhi	1,021	0.75%	−0.59
Independent	M. Arimalam Thiyagi Subramanian Mutharayar	927	0.68%	New
Margin of victory		31,135	22.99%	22.72%
Turnout		135,429	78.74%	6.12%
Registered electors		171,992		
AIADMK gain from INC		Swing	18.13%	

=== 2006 ===
2006 Tamil Nadu Legislative Assembly election: Thirumayam
Party	Candidate	Votes	%	±%
INC	Rm. Subburam	47,358	40.14%	New
AIADMK	M. Radhakrishnan	47,044	39.87%	−11.69
BJP	Ku. Pa. Krishnan	10,490	8.89%	New
DMDK	R. Murugesan	7,863	6.66%	New
BSP	K. Chellakkannu	1,581	1.34%	New
Independent	A. Radhakrishnan	1,462	1.24%	New
TNJC	R. Vengkatesan	618	0.52%	New
Independent	S. Narayanan	607	0.51%	New
Margin of victory		314	0.27%	−10.35%
Turnout		117,986	72.62%	13.03%
Registered electors		162,477		
INC gain from AIADMK		Swing	-11.42%	

=== 2001 ===
2001 Tamil Nadu Legislative Assembly election: Thirumayam
Party	Candidate	Votes	%	±%
AIADMK	M. Radakrishnan	58,394	51.56%	+14.72
DMK	S. Regupathy	46,367	40.94%	New
MDMK	A. Ganesan	3,131	2.76%	−1.11
Independent	M. Adaikkammai	1,606	1.42%	New
Independent	N. Ramayee Achi	1,555	1.37%	New
Independent	P. Chinnammal	1,235	1.09%	New
Independent	P. Manimoli	960	0.85%	New
Margin of victory		12,027	10.62%	0.11%
Turnout		113,248	59.59%	−6.09%
Registered electors		190,112		
AIADMK gain from TMC(M)		Swing	4.21%	

=== 1996 ===
1996 Tamil Nadu Legislative Assembly election: Thirumayam
Party	Candidate	Votes	%	±%
TMC(M)	V. Chinniah	53,552	47.35%	New
AIADMK	S. Regupathy	41,664	36.84%	−33.54
Independent	G. Annathurai	5,569	4.92%	New
MDMK	R. Pavanan	4,385	3.88%	New
Independent	P. Subbaiah	2,875	2.54%	New
AIIC(T)	M. Alaguraj	1,829	1.62%	New
Independent	A. Venkatachalam	1,327	1.17%	New
Margin of victory		11,888	10.51%	−32.79%
Turnout		113,093	65.68%	1.53%
Registered electors		181,332		
TMC(M) gain from AIADMK		Swing	-23.03%	

=== 1991 ===
1991 Tamil Nadu Legislative Assembly election: Thirumayam
Party	Candidate	Votes	%	±%
AIADMK	S. Regupathy	72,701	70.38%	+45.47
Thayaga Marumalarchi Kazhagam	Erama Govindarasan	27,970	27.08%	New
Independent	B. Arumugam	1,840	1.78%	New
PMK	P. Muthu	546	0.53%	New
Margin of victory		44,731	43.30%	37.93%
Turnout		103,295	64.15%	−7.54%
Registered electors		172,211		
AIADMK gain from DMK		Swing	40.09%	

=== 1989 ===
1989 Tamil Nadu Legislative Assembly election: Thirumayam
Party	Candidate	Votes	%	±%
DMK	V. Sobiah	32,374	30.29%	+2.16
INC	C. Swaminathan	26,630	24.92%	−44.5
AIADMK	S. Regupathy	26,625	24.91%	New
AIADMK	K. Vairamuthu	21,235	19.87%	New
Margin of victory		5,744	5.38%	−35.91%
Turnout		106,864	71.69%	−3.69%
Registered electors		151,912		
DMK gain from INC		Swing	-39.13%	

=== 1984 ===
1984 Tamil Nadu Legislative Assembly election: Thirumayam
Party	Candidate	Votes	%	±%
INC	T. Pushparaju	65,043	69.42%	+23.7
DMK	R. Pawanan	26,360	28.13%	New
INC(J)	R. Somsundaram	1,727	1.84%	New
Independent	Iramanarayanan	565	0.60%	New
Margin of victory		38,683	41.29%	41.03%
Turnout		93,695	75.38%	4.55%
Registered electors		129,285		
INC hold		Swing	23.70%	

=== 1980 ===
1980 Tamil Nadu Legislative Assembly election: Thirumayam
Party	Candidate	Votes	%	±%
INC	N. Sundararaj	39,479	45.72%	+19.8
AIADMK	Pulavar Ponnambalam	39,256	45.46%	+19.61
Independent	S. Seenivasan	7,609	8.81%	New
Margin of victory		223	0.26%	0.19%
Turnout		86,344	70.82%	2.42%
Registered electors		123,324		
INC hold		Swing	19.80%	

=== 1977 ===
1977 Tamil Nadu Legislative Assembly election: Thirumayam
Party	Candidate	Votes	%	±%
INC	N. Sundararaj	20,694	25.92%	−7.61
AIADMK	P. Ponnambalam	20,637	25.85%	New
Independent	V. Subbiah	18,505	23.18%	New
DMK	K. Duraikkannu	14,427	18.07%	−35.13
JP	R. Raja	4,559	5.71%	New
Independent	V. Somasundara Odiyar	578	0.72%	New
Independent	M. Iyalarasan Alias Govindan	425	0.53%	New
Margin of victory		57	0.07%	−19.59%
Turnout		79,825	68.40%	−8.30%
Registered electors		118,468		
INC gain from DMK		Swing	-27.27%	

=== 1971 ===
1971 Tamil Nadu Legislative Assembly election: Thirumayam
Party	Candidate	Votes	%	±%
DMK	A. Thiagarajan	38,630	53.20%	−9.59
INC	P. R. Ramanathan	24,353	33.54%	−0.73
CPI(M)	R. Umanath	5,470	7.53%	New
Independent	V. Somasundaram	3,186	4.39%	New
Independent	A. K. Sakthivel	695	0.96%	New
Margin of victory		14,277	19.66%	−8.86%
Turnout		72,615	76.70%	−6.52%
Registered electors		99,743		
DMK hold		Swing	-9.59%	

=== 1967 ===
1967 Madras Legislative Assembly election: Thirumayam
Party	Candidate	Votes	%	±%
DMK	Ponnambalam	44,511	62.79%	New
INC	V. Ramiah	24,290	34.26%	−9.31
Independent	V. Somasundaram	2,088	2.95%	New
Margin of victory		20,221	28.52%	12.61%
Turnout		70,889	83.22%	11.59%
Registered electors		89,371		
DMK gain from INC		Swing	19.21%	

=== 1962 ===
1962 Madras Legislative Assembly election: Thirumayam
Party	Candidate	Votes	%	±%
INC	V. Ramaiah	28,219	43.58%	−12.25
Independent	V. Balakrishnan	17,916	27.67%	New
SWA	Ramasrinivasan	16,915	26.12%	New
Independent	S. Muthu	1,703	2.63%	New
Margin of victory		10,303	15.91%	−20.86%
Turnout		64,753	71.63%	15.75%
Registered electors		95,588		
INC hold		Swing	-12.25%	

=== 1957 ===
1957 Madras Legislative Assembly election: Thirumayam
Party	Candidate	Votes	%	±%
INC	V. Ramiah	28,178	55.83%	+31.25
Independent	Muthuvairava Ambalagarar	9,619	19.06%	New
Independent	S. Natarajan Servai	8,867	17.57%	New
PSP	Kasi Viswanathan	3,804	7.54%	New
Margin of victory		18,559	36.77%	35.52%
Turnout		50,468	55.88%	−40.48%
Registered electors		90,321		
INC hold		Swing	31.25%	

=== 1952 ===
1952 Madras Legislative Assembly election: Thirumayam
Party	Candidate	Votes	%	±%
INC	Palaniyappan	37,692	24.58%	New
KMPP	Audiappan Ambalagarar	35,769	23.33%	New
TTP	Chinnayya	31,562	20.58%	New
INC	Sambasiva Moopan	28,579	18.64%	New
Independent	Rajagapola Pandarathar	13,178	8.59%	New
Independent	Sivaswam Rangiyar	6,546	4.27%	New
Margin of victory		1,923	1.25%	
Turnout		153,326	96.36%	
Registered electors		159,125		
INC win (new seat)				
