= V. Ramaiah =

Indian politician

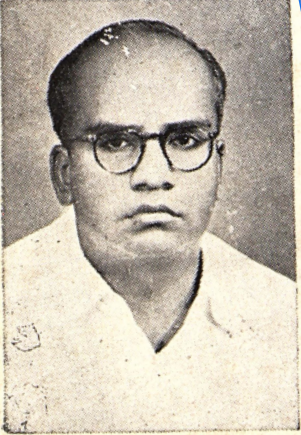

Member of the Madras State Assembly
- In office 1957 - 1962; 1962 - 1967
- Preceded by: Muthuvairava Ambalagarar
- Constituency: Thirumayam

Minister for Electricity and Prohibition & Excise
- In office 1 April 1957 – 1 March 1962

Personal details
- Political party: Indian National Congress

V. Ramaiah is an Indian politician former member of parliament and former Member of the Legislative Assembly of Tamil Nadu. He was elected to the Tamil Nadu legislative assembly as an Indian National Congress candidate from Tirumayam constituency in 1957 and 1962. He has been a minister in Kamaraj and Bhakthavachalam cabinet elections.
