= Melamelnilai =

Village in India

Melamelnilai is a settlement in Pudukkottai district, Tamil Nadu, India.

Coordinates are 9.9536546,78.4093455.
