= Vegupatti =

- Village
- Location in Tamil Nadu, India Vegupatti (India)
- Coordinates: 10.274764°N 78.563758°E
- Country: India
- State: Tamil Nadu
- District: Pudukkottai
- Founder: Chettiyars
- Named for: Nattukottai chettiyars

Population
  - Total: 3,009
- Time zone: UTC+5:30 (IST)

Vegupatti is a small village in Pudukkottai district, Tamil Nadu, India, located three kilometres away from the town of Ponnamaravathi. In the 2011 census of India, Vegupatti had a population of 3009.
