= Alangudi taluk =

Coordinates: 10.361898°N 78.980316°E

Alangudi taluk is a taluk of Pudukkottai district of the Indian state of Tamil Nadu. The headquarters of the taluk is the town of Alangudi.

== Demographics ==
According to the 2011 census, Alangudi taluk had a population of 170361 with 83969 males and 86392 females. It had a literacy rate of 72.07. Children under six years old totalled 8974 males and 8642 females.
