= S. P. Muthukumaran =

Indian politician

S. P. Muthukumaran was an Indian politician and incumbent Member of the Tamil Nadu Legislative Assembly from the Pudukottai constituency. He represents the Communist Party of India party.

He died on 1 April 2012 as the result of a road accident.
