= Avudaiyarkoil =

Avudaiyarkoil Avudaiyar Koil Tirupperunturai Avadea Covill during the British Raj]
- village

- Location within Tamil Nadu
- Coordinates: 10°04′23″N 79°02′24″E
- Country: India
- State: Tamil Nadu
- District: Pudukkotai district
- Taluk: Avadaiyarkoil

Avudaiyarkoil is one of the blocks and Taluk in the Pudukkotai district of Tamil Nadu, India. The village has a temple named Tirupperunturai. It is about 14 kilometres (9 mi) South East of the Major town Aranthangi along State Highway 26 (SH 26), on the South bank of the Vellar River.

== Gallery ==
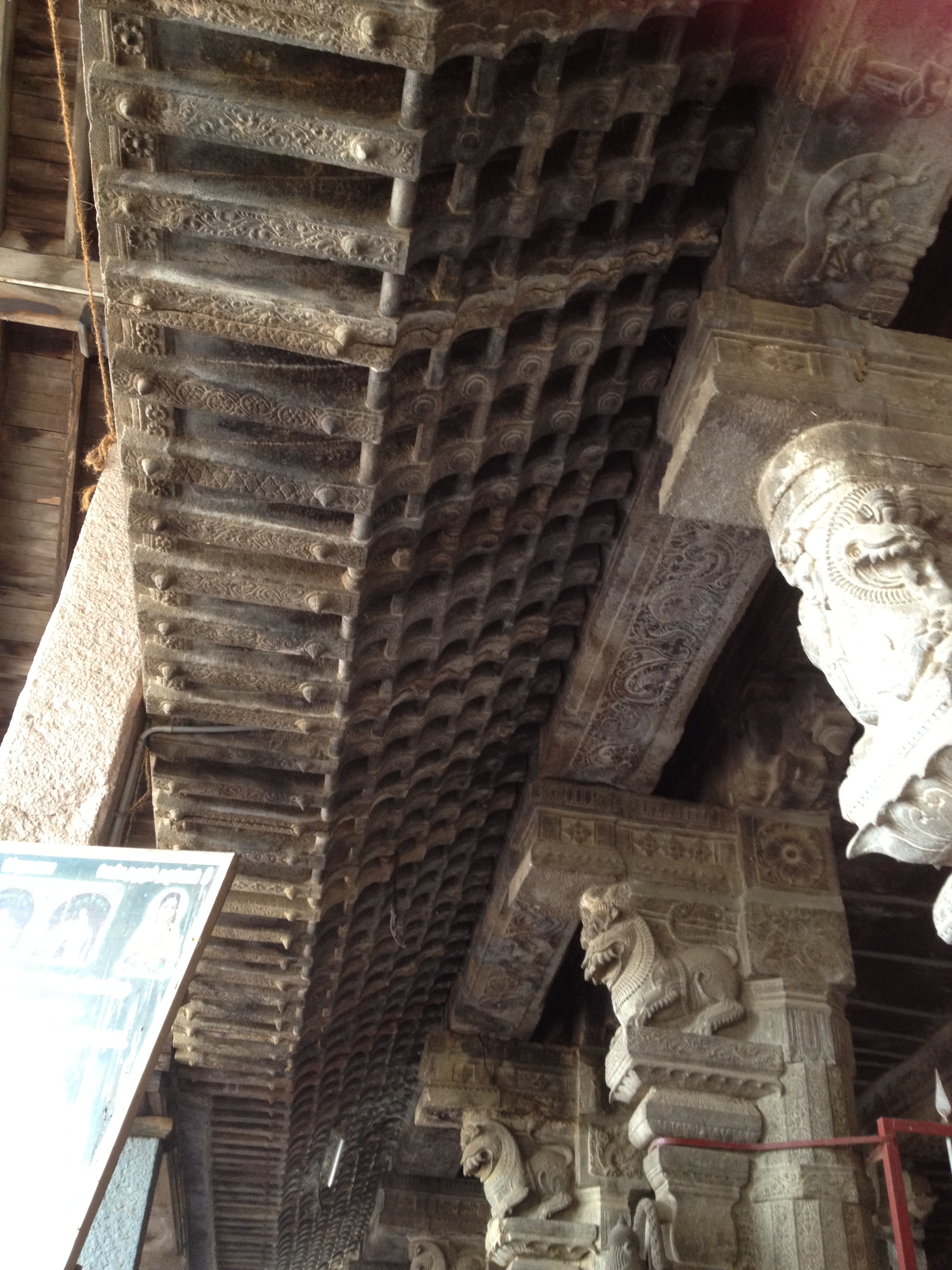
The Stone, Kodungai, work in the ceiling of the Ponnarangu (Golden Hall)

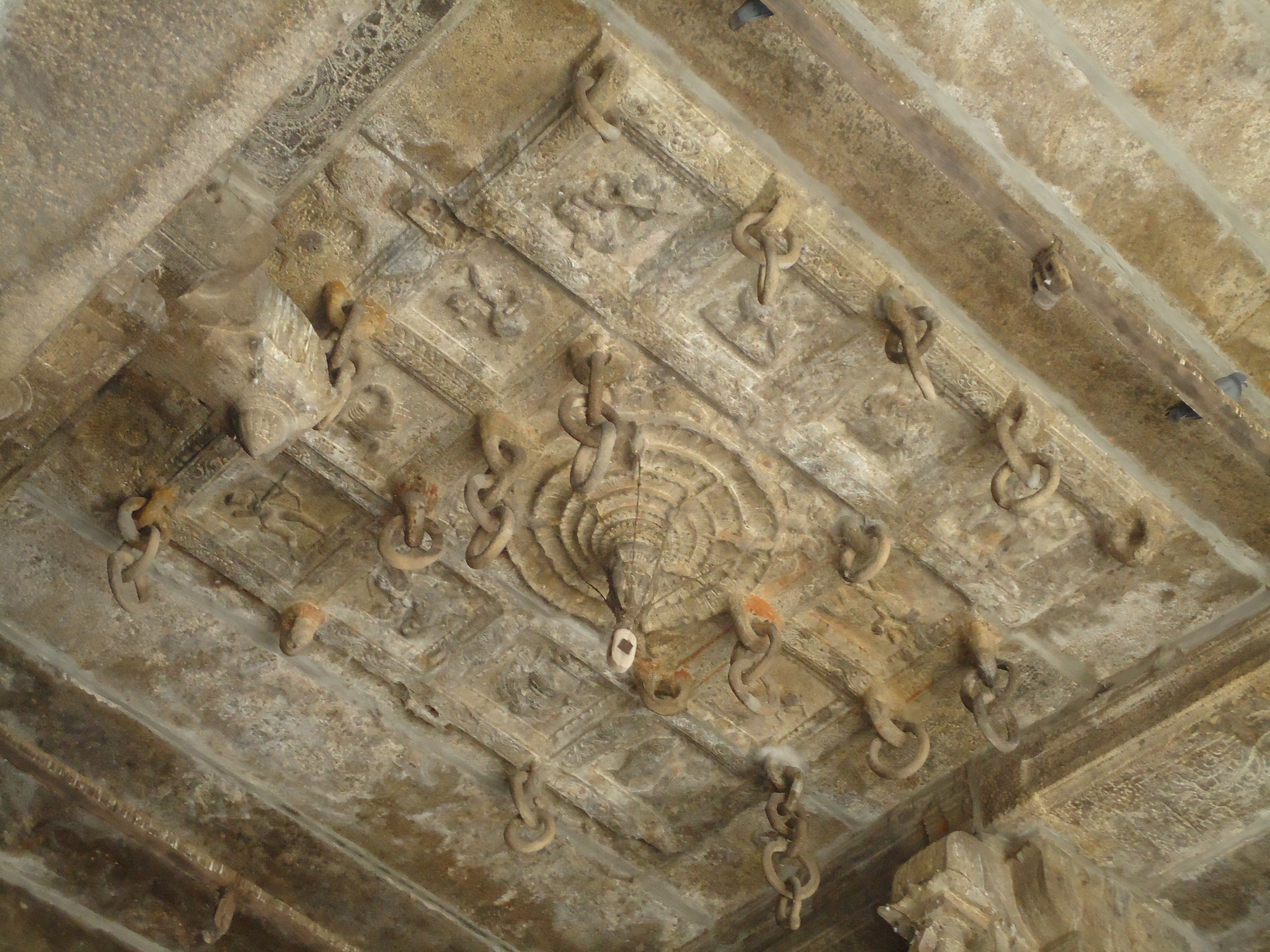
Stone Rings in the Ceiling of Thiyagarayar Mandapam

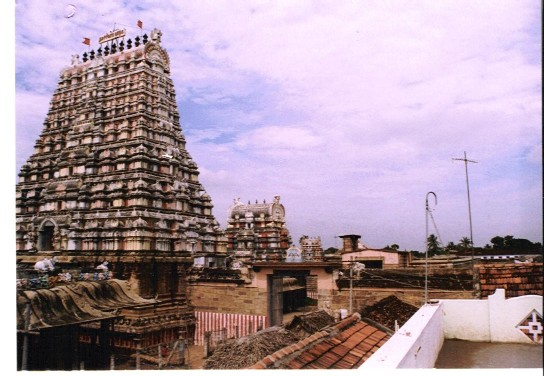
Avudayar Kovil (Tirupperunturai temple)

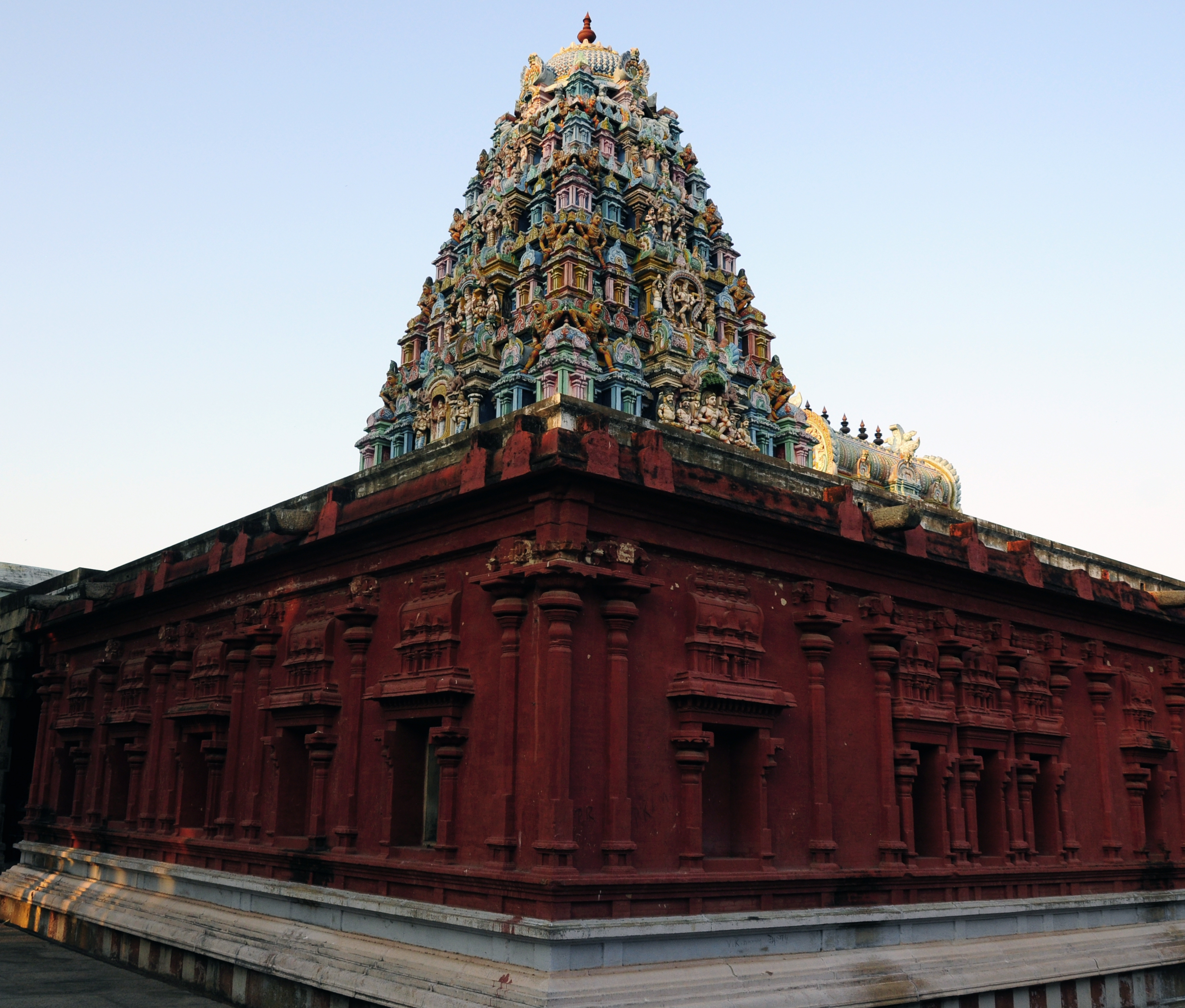
View of the Tower over the Sanctum

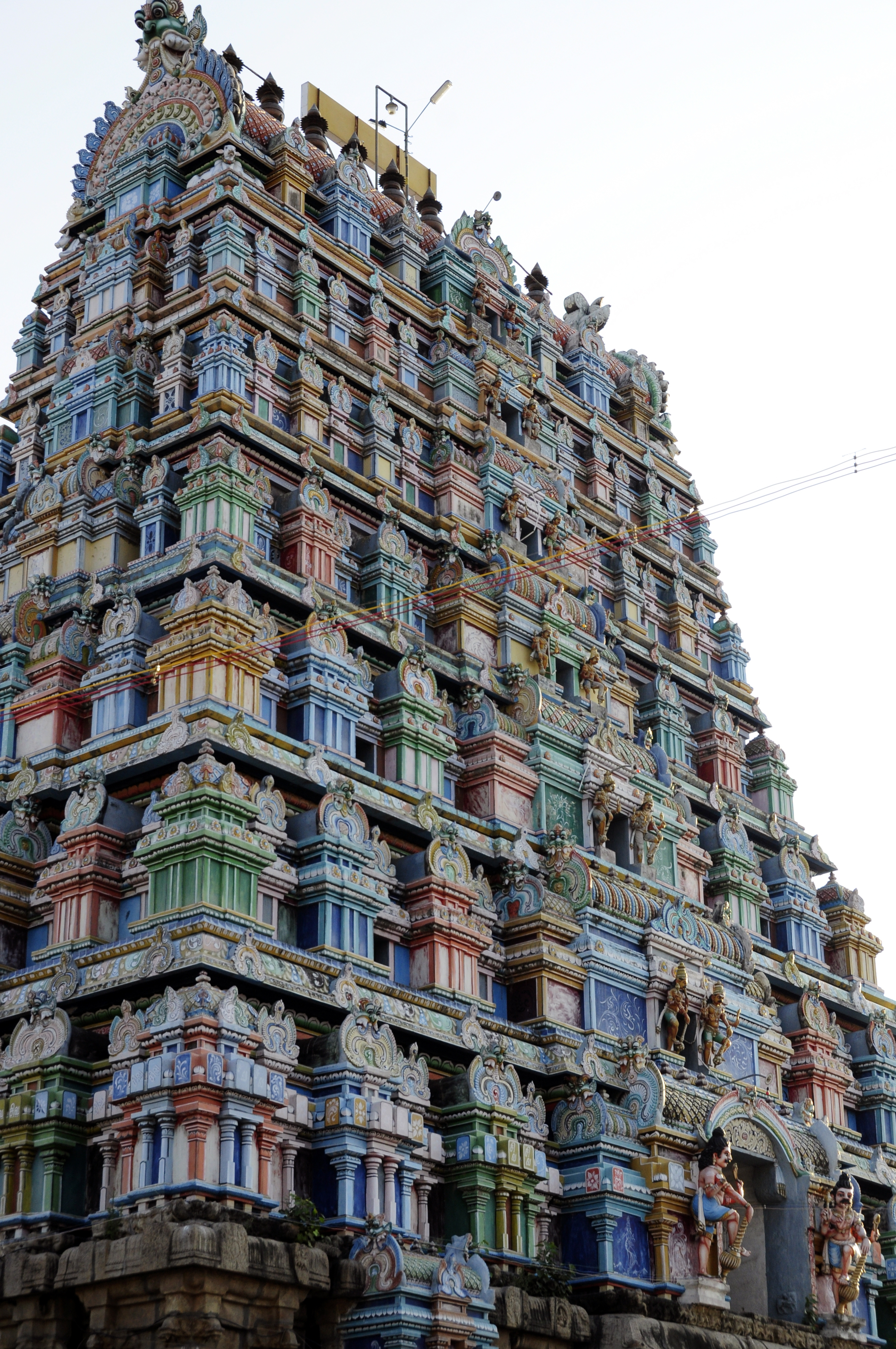
Periya Gopuram

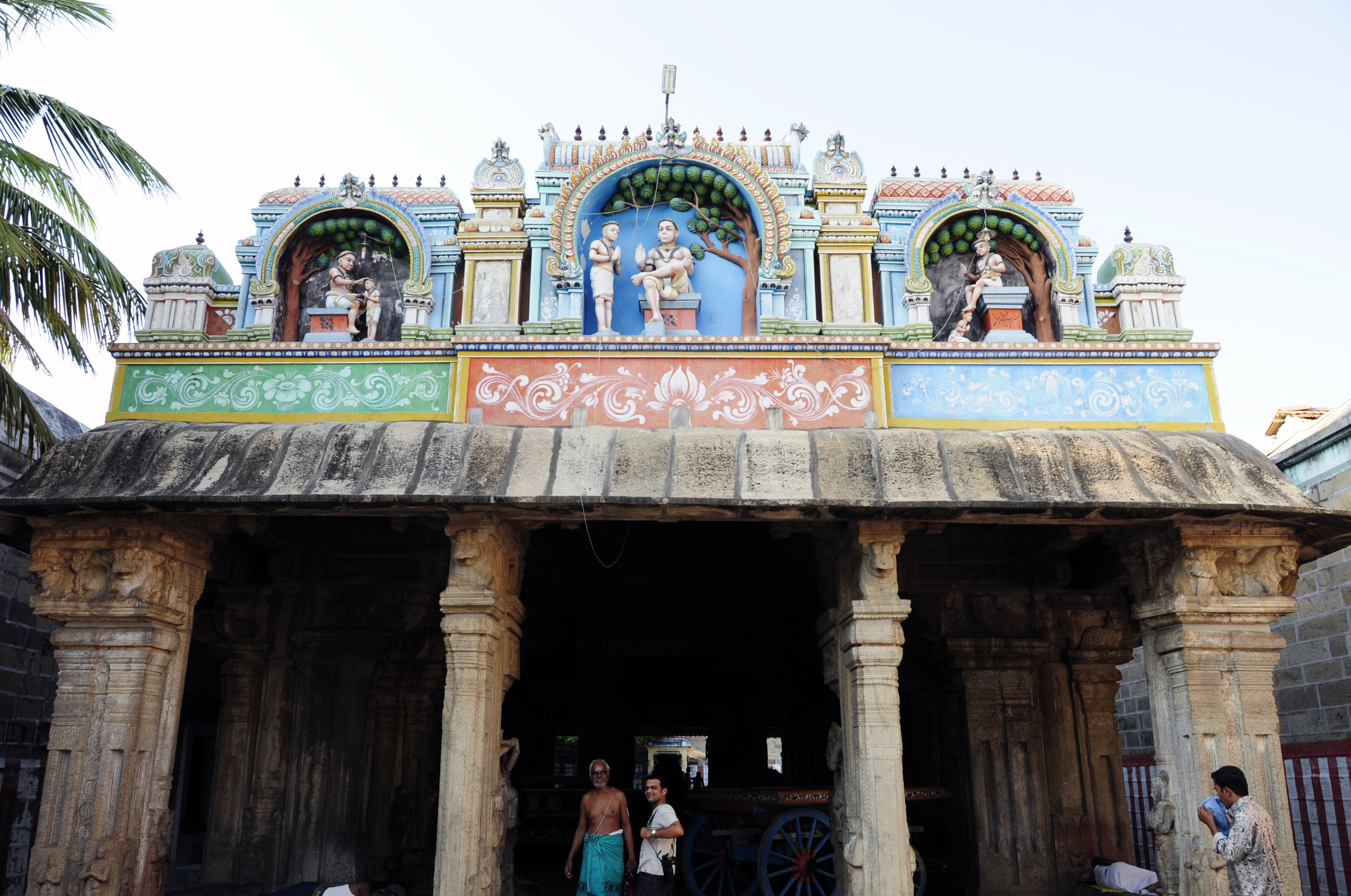
Temple Entrance
