= V. Muthuraja =

Indian politician

Member of the Tamil Nadu Legislative Assembly
- Incumbent
- Assumed office 12 May 2021
- Preceded by: V. R. Karthik Thondaiman
- Succeeded by: Periyannan Arassu
- Constituency: Pudukkottai

Personal details
- Political party: Dravida Munnetra Kazhagam

V. Muthuraja is an Indian politician who is a Member of Legislative Assembly of Tamil Nadu. He was elected from Pudukkottai as a Dravida Munnetra Kazhagam candidate in 2021.

== Elections contested ==
Election	Constituency	Party	Result	Vote %	Runner-up	Runner-up Party	Runner-up vote %
2021 Tamil Nadu Legislative Assembly election	Pudukkottai	DMK	Won	47.70%	V. R. Karthik Thondaiman	ADMK	40.47%
