= Rajakumar Vijaya Raghunatha Thondaiman =

Indian politician

Member of the Tamil Nadu Legislative Assembly
- In office 1967 - 1972; 1977 - 1984
- Constituency: Pudukkottai

Personal details
- Party: Indian National Congress

Rajakumar Vijaya Raghunatha Thondaiman is an Indian politician and former member of the Legislative Assembly of Tamil Nadu. He is a member of the Pudukkottai Royal Family, youngest brother of the Maharajah of Pudukkottai state. He was elected to the Tamil Nadu legislative assembly as an Indian National Congress candidate from Pudukkottai constituency in 1967, 1971, 1977 elections and as an Indian National Congress (Indira) candidate in 1980 election.
