= P. K. Vairamuthu =

Indian politician

P. K. Vairamuthu is an Indian politician and he was member of the Tamil Nadu Legislative Assembly in 2011 from the Thirumayam constituency. He represented the All India Anna Dravida Munnetra Kazhagam party.
