= Thennambadi =

Village in India

- Village
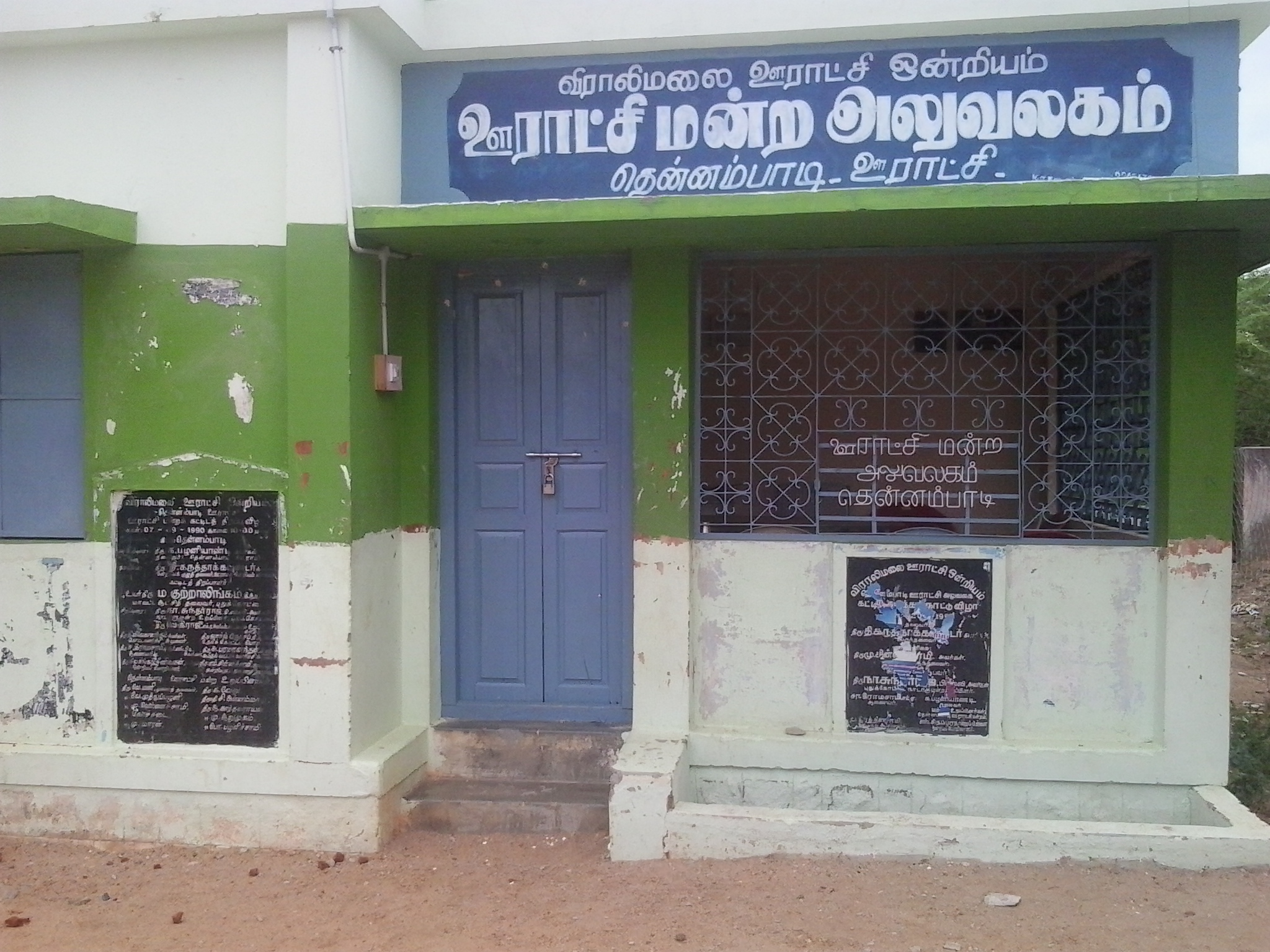

- Location in Tamil Nadu, India Thennambadi (India)
- Coordinates: 10°33′30.53″N 78°33′10.78″E
- Country: India
- State: Tamil Nadu
- District: Pudukkottai

Population (2011)
  - Total: 2,147

Languages
  - Official: Tamil
- Time zone: UTC+5:30 (IST)
- PIN: 621316
- Telephone code: 04339
- Nearest city: Trichy
- Lok Sabha constituency: Karur
- Vidhan Sabha constituency: Viralimalai
- Website: www.thennambadi.com

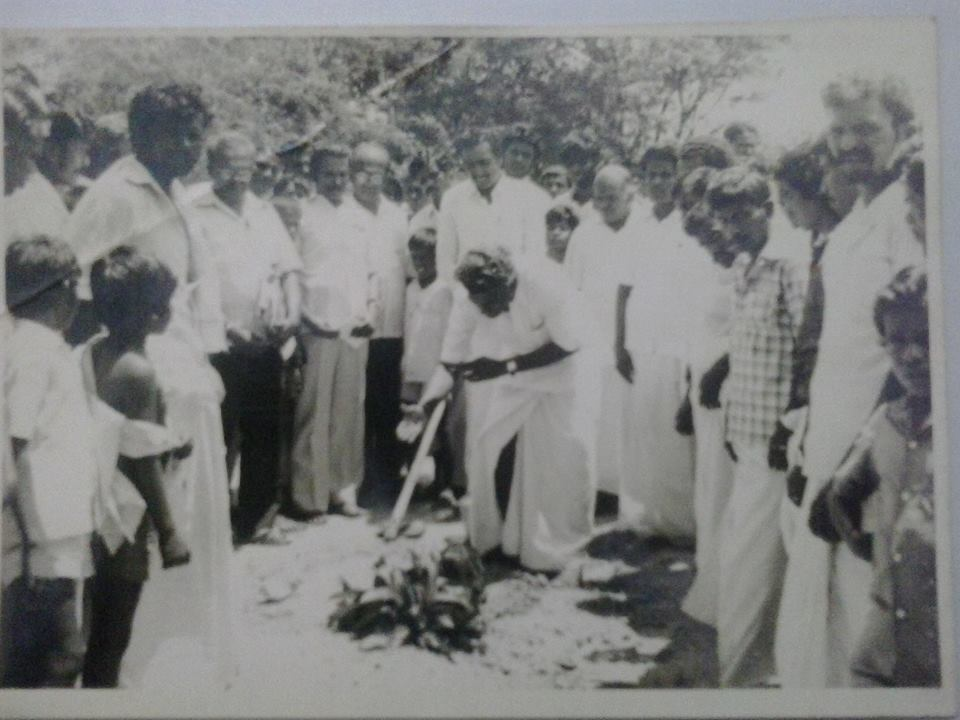
Thennambadi_Gram_Panchayat_Office1.jpg

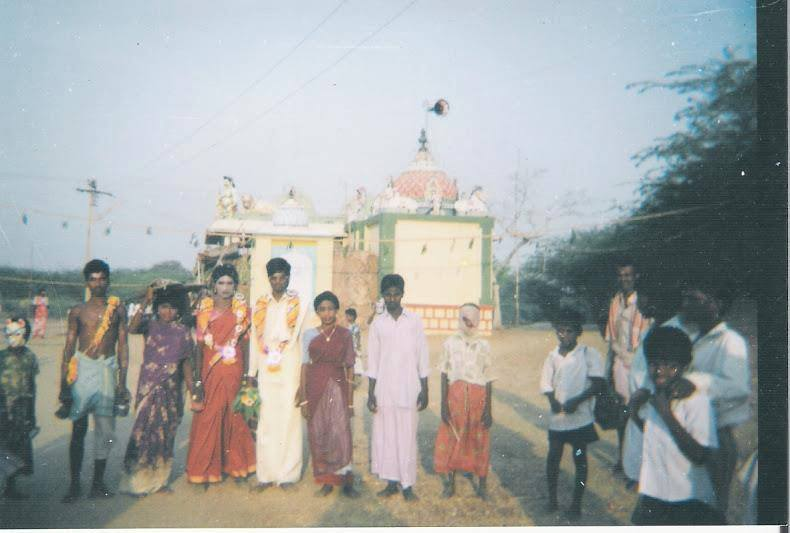
THENNAMBADI FESTIVAL

Thennambadi, or Thennambady is a small village in Tamil Nadu, India located 6 km From Viralimalai.

Thennambadi is one of the village in Viralimalai Taluk in Pudukkottai District in Tamil Nadu State. Thennambadi is 38 km far from its District Main City Pudukkottai.

Sub Villages in Thennambadi

Gounder street, Medukattanpatti, Thappukattanpatti, Kella Sangampatti, Mela sangampatti, Sattikuppampatti, Kalarankattupatti, Koothakuditti, Kodikalpatti
