= A. Periannan =

Indian politician

A. Periannan, sometimes spelled A. Periyannan, (died 15 November 1996) was an Indian politician and a Member of the Legislative Assembly of Tamil Nadu. He was elected to the Tamil Nadu legislative assembly as a Dravida Munnetra Kazhagam candidate from Pudukkottai constituency in the 1989 and 1996 elections and 2006.

Periannan died on 15 November 1996. Periannan Arasu, a son of Periannan, followed his father into politics as a DMK election candidate.
