= V. R. Karthik Thondaiman =

Indian politician

V. R. Karthik Thondaiman is an Indian politician and former member of the Tamil Nadu Legislative Assembly from the Pudukkottai constituency, also he is originally from Pudukkottai Kingdom family. He represents the All India Anna Dravida Munnetra Kazhagam party.

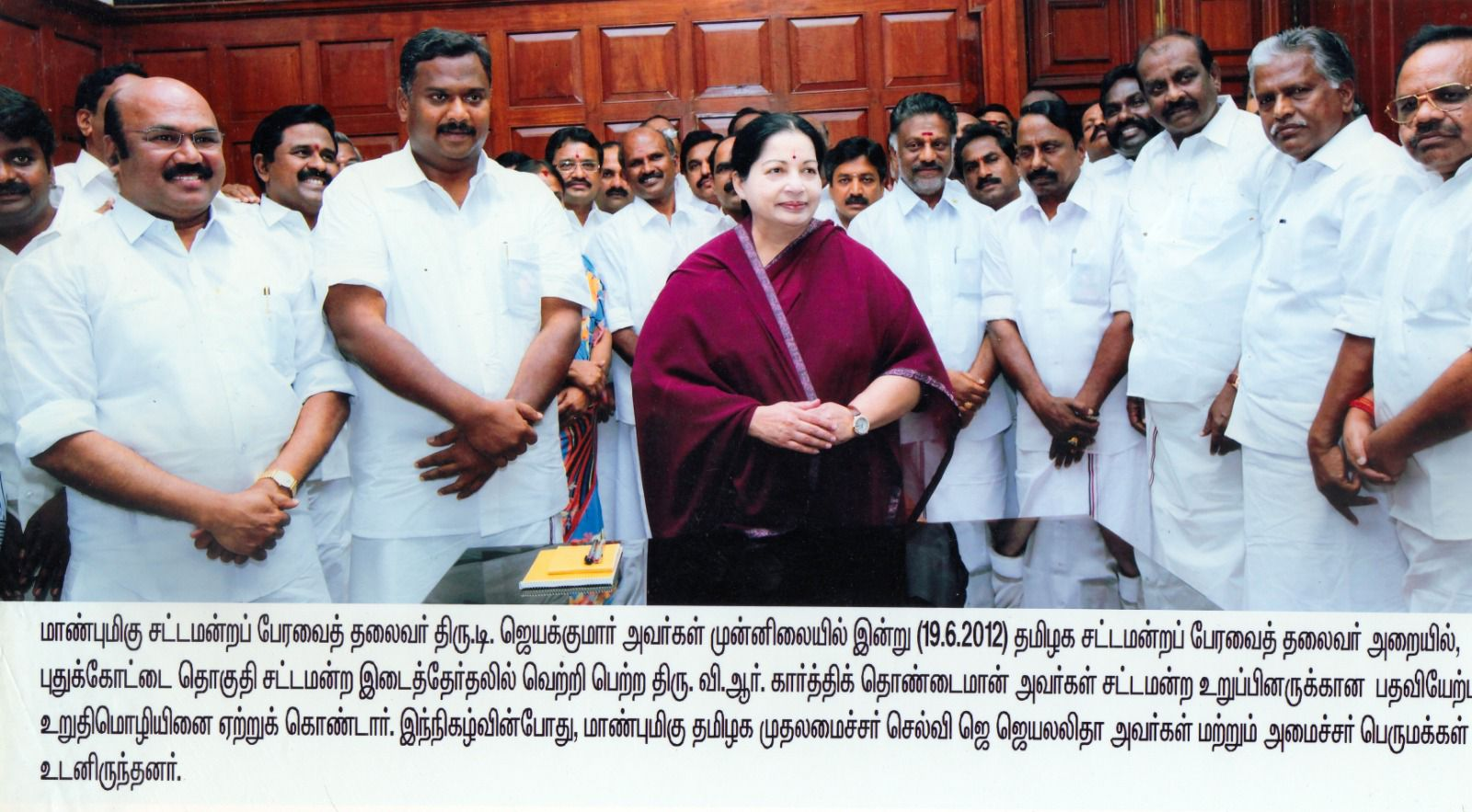
Thondaiman along with Chief Minister Jayalalithaa and Admk leaders after taking oath as MLA in 2012
