= S. Regupathy =

Indian politician

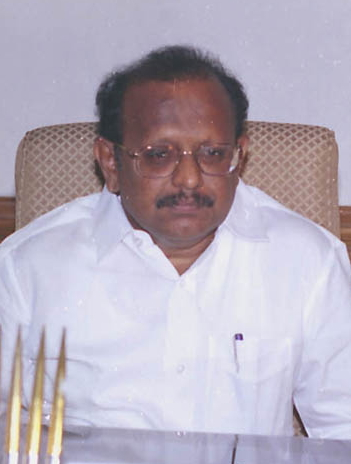
- S. Regupathy in 2004

Cabinet Minister Government of Tamil Nadu
- In office 8 May 2025 – 5 May 2026
- Minister: Minerals And Mines
- Chief Minister: M. K. Stalin
- Preceded by: Durai Murugan
- In office 7 May 2021 – 8 May 2025
- Minister: Law; Courts; Prisons and Prevention of Corruption
- Chief Minister: M. K. Stalin
- Preceded by: C. V. Shanmugam
- Succeeded by: Durai Murugan

Ministers of State for Environment and Forests, Government of India
- In office 18 May 2007 – 23 May 2009
- Prime Minister: Manmohan Singh

Ministers of State for Home Affairs, Government of India
- In office 22 May 2004 – 18 May 2007
- Prime Minister: Manmohan Singh

Minister for Housing and Urban Development. Government of Tamil Nadu
- In office 24 June 1991 – 12 May 1996
- Chief Minister: J. Jayalalithaa
- Preceded by: M. Kannappan
- Succeeded by: K. Pitchandi

Member of the Tamil Nadu Legislative Assembly for Tirumayam
- Incumbent
- Assumed office 24 May 2016
- Preceded by: P. K. Vairamuthu

Member of Parliament for Pudukkottai
- In office 16 May 2004 – 16 May 2009
- Preceded by: S. Thirunavukkarasar
- Succeeded by: Position Abolished

Personal details
- Born: 30 July 1950 (age 76) Pudukkottai, Tamil Nadu
- Party: DMK
- Other political affiliations: AIADMK (until 2000)
- Spouse: Saroja Regupathy
- Children: 1 son and 1 daughter

Sevugan Regupathy (born 30 July 1950) is an Indian politician belonging to the Dravida Munnetra Kazhagam (DMK) political party. He is currently a member of the Tamil Nadu Legislative Assembly representing Tirumayam. He served as the Minister for Minerals And Mines from 2025 to 2026. He also served as the Minister for Law, Courts, Prisons and Prevention of Corruption in M. K. Stalin ministry from 2021 to 2025.

Regupathy was previously a member of the 14th Lok Sabha of India, representing the now defunct Pudukkottai constituency of Tamil Nadu.

He served as Minister of State in the Ministry of Environment and Forests from 2007. He is the chairman of Karpaga Vinayaga educational group in Chennai.

== History ==
S. Regupathy was previously with the AIADMK before joining the DMK.

He served as the labour minister in the AIADMK cabinet from 1992 to 1993 and as the minister of urban development and housing till 1996 before switching to the DMK. His move was part of a broader trend of former AIADMK leaders joining DMK and being given major roles in the cabinet.

Ministers in DMK like EV Velu, Senthil Balaji, Regupathy and Sekar Babu were from AIADMK.
