= Alangudi, Pudukkottai =

Alangudi
- Town municipality
- Location in Tamil Nadu, India
- Coordinates: 10.361100°N 78.979600°E
- Country: India
- State: Tamil Nadu
- District: Pudukkottai
- Elevation: 104 m (341 ft)

Population (2001)
  - Total: 10,742

Languages
  - Official: Tamil
- Time zone: UTC+5:30 (IST)
- PIN: 622 301
- Telephone code: 04322
- Vehicle registration: TN 55

Alangudi is a municipality in the Pudukkottai district of the Indian state of Tamil Nadu, that serves as the headquarters for Alangudi taluk, one of the 11 taluks in Pudukkottai district. The town has been ruled, at different times, by the Cholas, Mutharaiyars, Early Pandyas, Thondaimans, and the British. It is situated about 395 kilometres (245 mi) southwest of Chennai and about 75 kilometres (47 mi) southeast of Tiruchirappalli. Tamil Nadu's first women Asiad Santhi Soundarajan is from Alangudi municipality.

== Geography ==
Alangudi is located at 10.37°N 78.98°E. It has an average elevation of 79 metres (259 feet).

== Demographics ==
As of 2001 India census, Alangudi had a population of 10,742. Males constituted 51% of the population and females 49%. Alangudi had an average literacy rate of 77%, higher than the national average of 59.5%; with 55% of the males and 45% of females literate.

== Politics ==
The Alangudi (State Assembly Constituency) is part of the Sivaganga (Lok Sabha constituency).

The current Environment and Climate Change minister and member of legislative assembly for Alangudi is V.Meyyanathan.
