= Iluppur =

Iluppur Illupaoor
- Panchayat town
- Location in Tamil Nadu, India
- Coordinates: 10.52°N 78.63°E
- Country: India
- State: Tamil Nadu
- District: Pudukkottai
- Elevation: 142 m (466 ft)

Population (2001)
  - Total: 12,051

Languages
  - Official: Tamil
- Time zone: UTC+5:30 (IST)

Iluppur is a panchayat town in Pudukkottai district in the Indian state of Tamil Nadu.

== Geography ==
Iluppur is located at 10.52°N 78.63°E. It has an average elevation of 142 metres (465 feet).

== Demographics ==
As of 2001 India census, Iluppur had a population of 12,051. Males constitute 50% of the population and females 50%. Iluppur has an average literacy rate of 70%, higher than the national average of 59.5%: male literacy is 78%, and female literacy is 63%. In Iluppur, 17% of the population is under 6 years of age.
