= Pudukkottai district =

- District
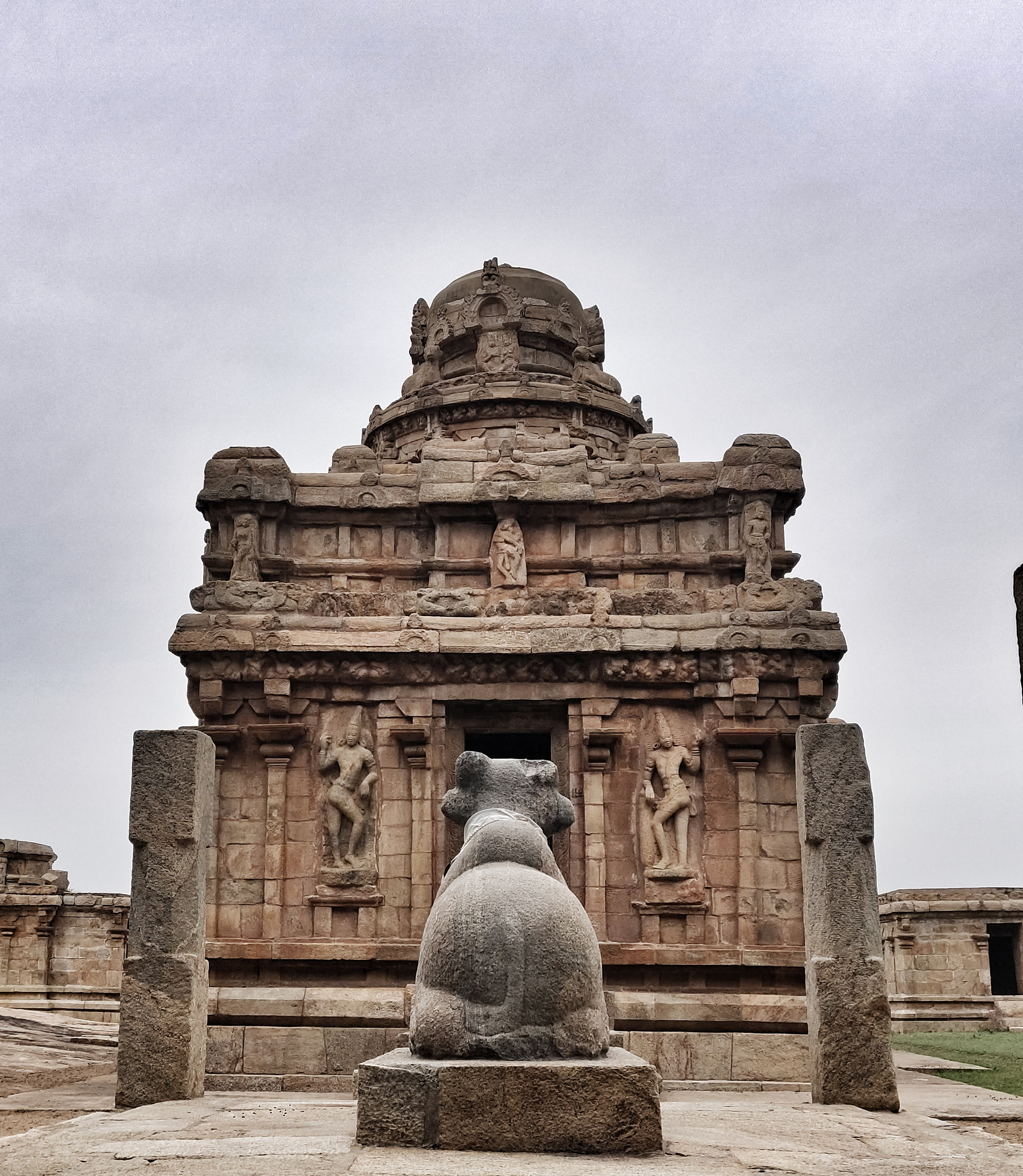
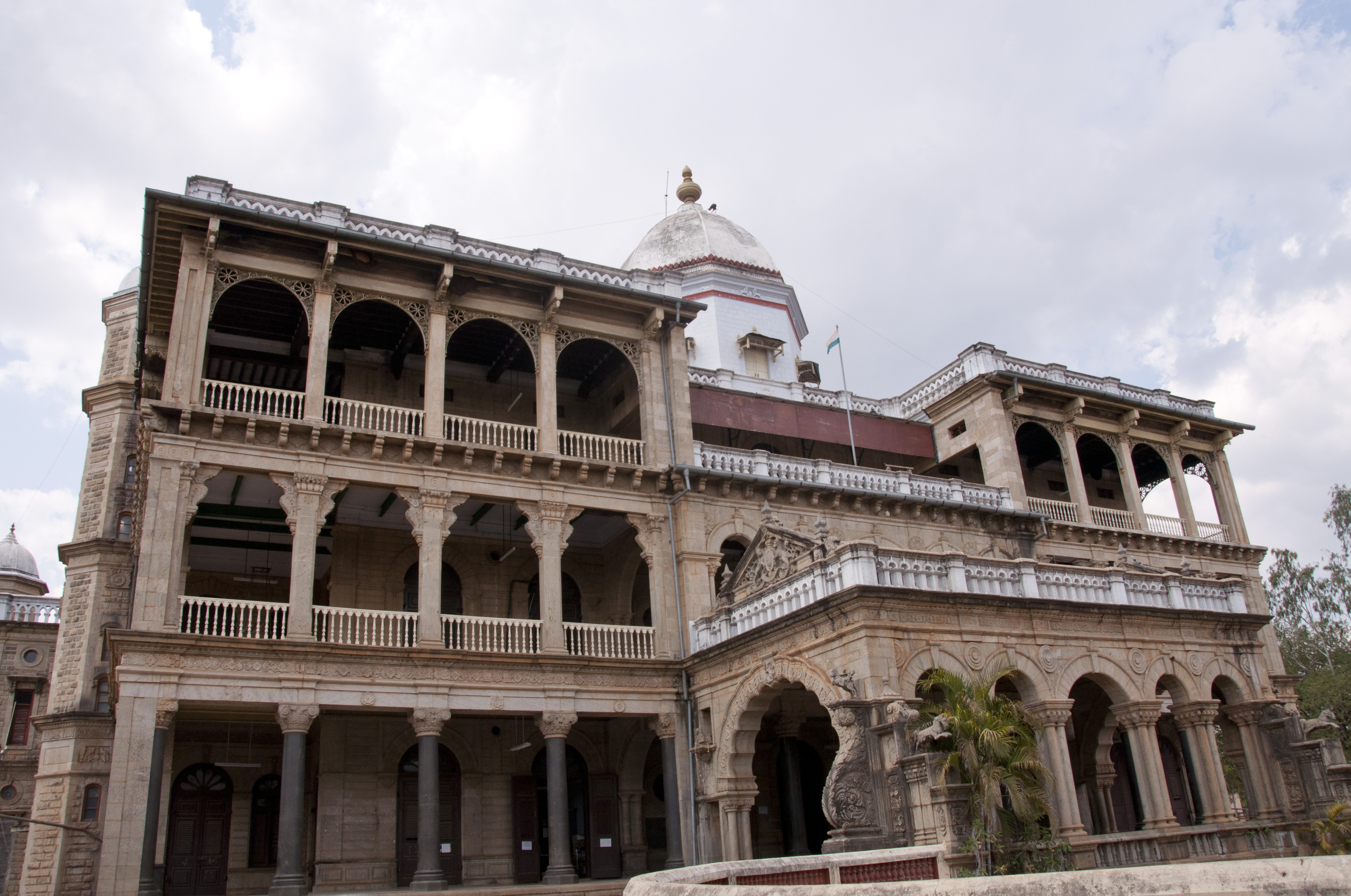
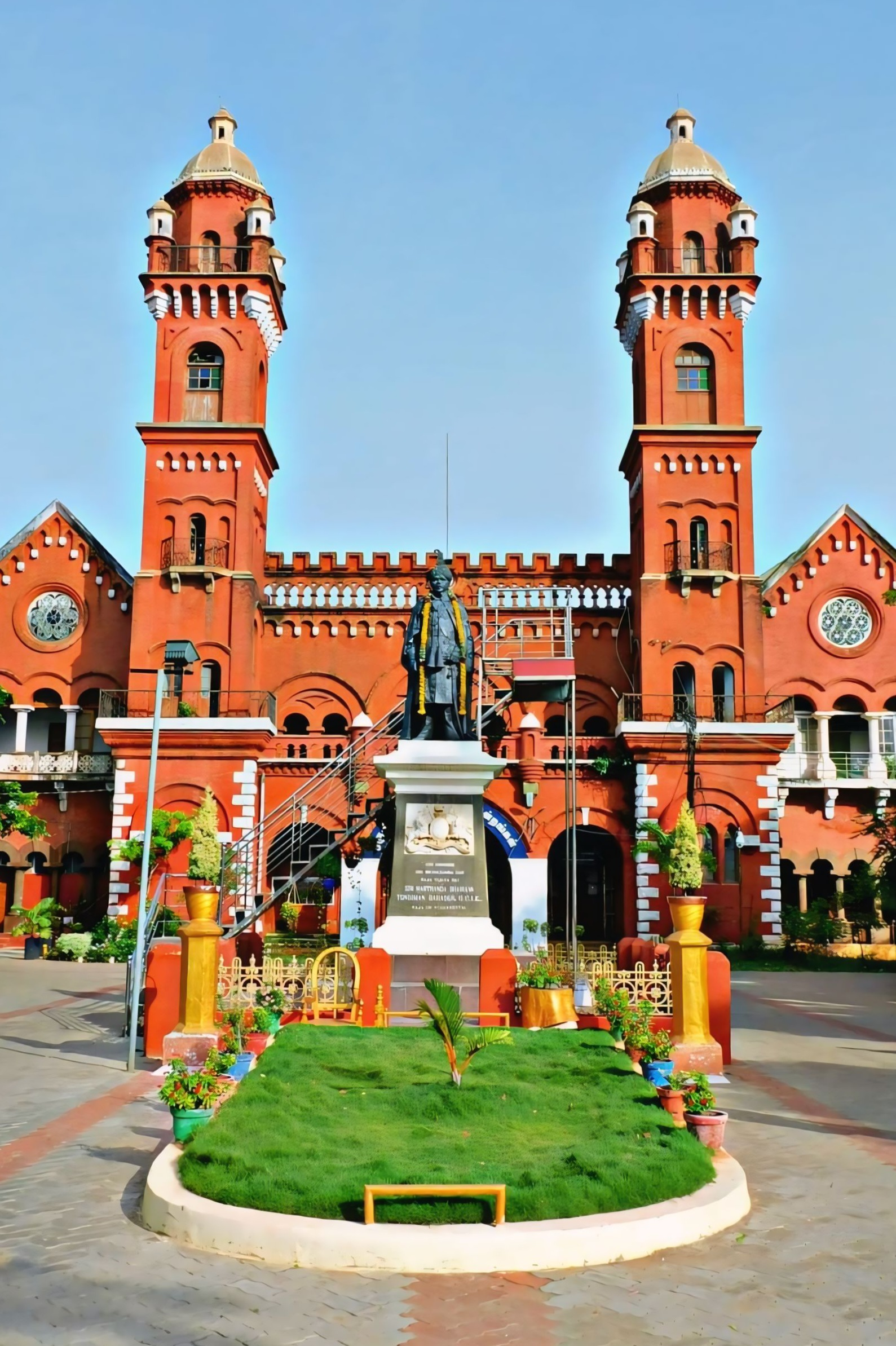
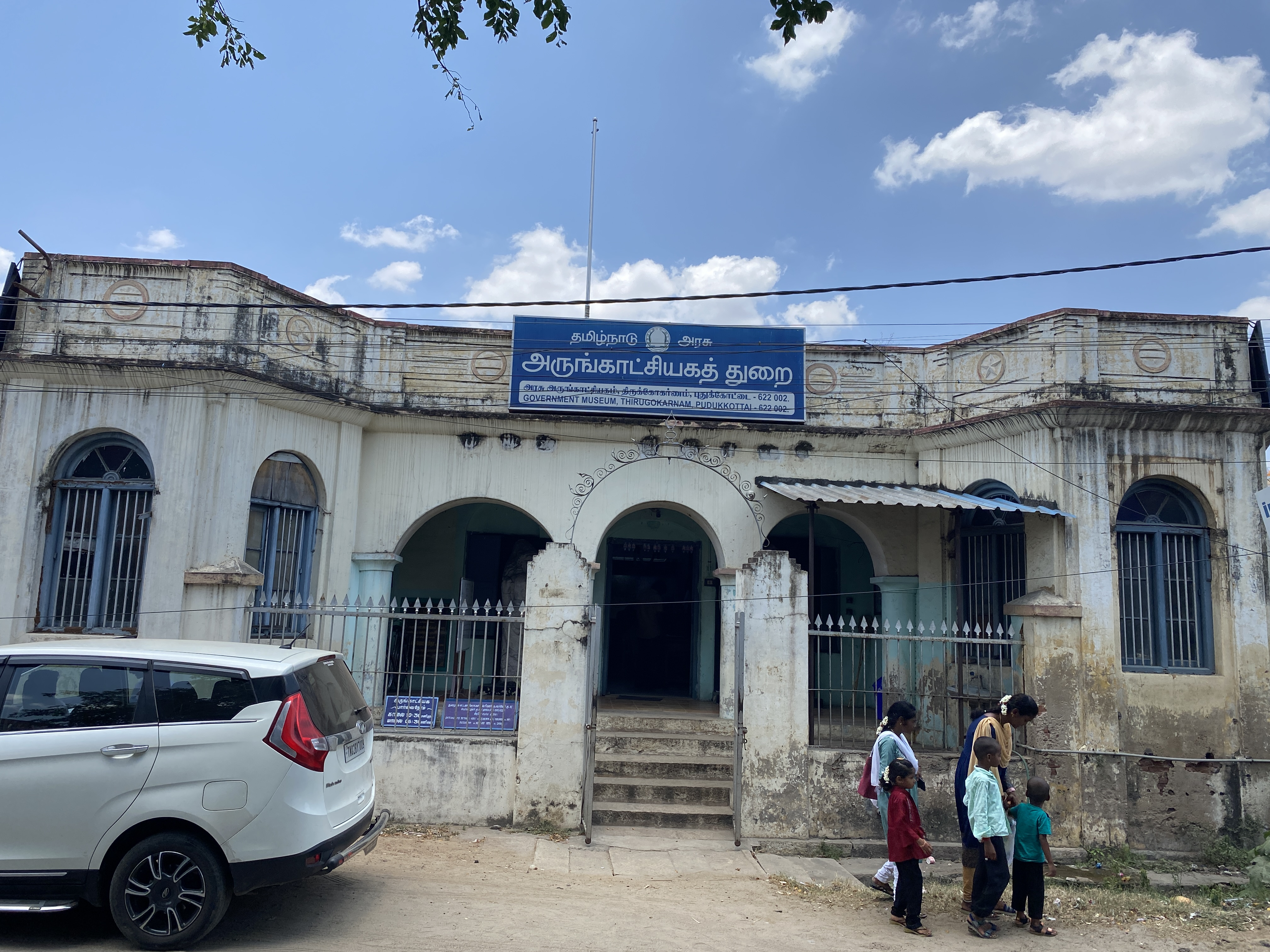
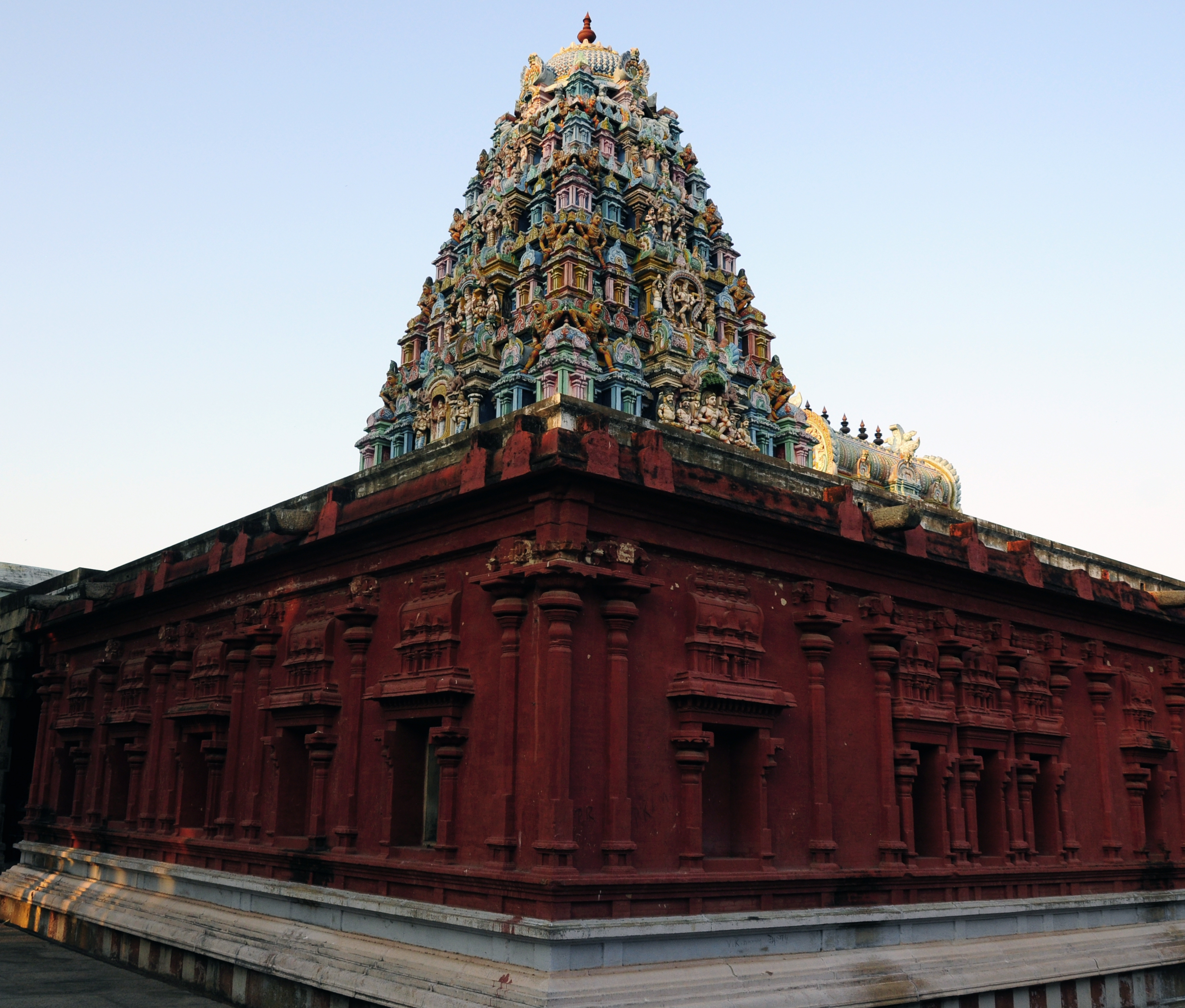
- Vijayalaya Choleeswaram Temple Pudukkottai palace Pudukkottai District Court Government Museum, Pudukkottai Avudaiyarkoil

- Location in Tamil Nadu
- Pudukkottai district
- Coordinates: 10.38°N 78.82°E
- Country: India
- State: Tamil Nadu
- District: Pudukkottai
- City Corporations: Pudukkottai
- Pudukkottai: 14 January 1974
- Headquarters: Pudukkottai
- Talukas: Pudukkottai, Aranthangi, Alangudi, Karambakudi, Thirumayam, Ponnamaravathi, Gandarvakottai, Avudaiyarkoil, Manamelkudi, Kulathur, Iluppur, Viralimalai.

Government
  - District Collector & District Magistrate: Mrs. M.Aruna, IAS
  - Superintendent of Police: Vanditha Pandey, IPS

Area
  - Total: 4,663 km^{2} (1,800 sq mi)

Population (2011)
  - Total: 1,618,345
  - Density: 347.1/km^{2} (898.9/sq mi)

Languages
  - Official: Tamil,
- Time zone: UTC+5:30 (IST)
- PIN: 621xxx, 622xxx, 614xxx, 613xxx
- Telephone code: 04322
- ISO 3166 code: [[ISO 3166-2:IN|]]
- Vehicle registration: TN-55
- Coastline: 42 kilometres (26 mi)
- Largest city: Pudukkottai
- Sex ratio: M-50%/F-50% ♂/♀
- Literacy: 80%
- Legislature type: elected
- Lok Sabha constituency: 4 (Partly)
- Vidhan Sabha constituency: 6
- Precipitation: 827 millimetres (32.6 in)
- Avg. summer temperature: 40.9 °C (105.6 °F)
- Avg. winter temperature: 17.8 °C (64.0 °F)
- Website: pudukkottai.nic.in

Pudukkottai district is one of the 38 districts of Tamil Nadu state in southern India. The city of Pudukkottai is the district headquarters. It is also known colloquially as Pudhugai. The city is also known as Thondaiman Pudukkottai.

Pudukkottai district is bounded on the northeast and east by Thanjavur District, on the southeast by the Palk Strait, on the southwest by Ramanathapuram and Sivaganga districts, and on the west and northwest by Tiruchirapalli District. As of 2011, the district had a population of 1,618,345 with a sex-ratio of 1,015 females for every 1,000 males.

The district has an area of 4,663 km^{2} with a coastline of 42 km. The district lies between 78° 25' and 79° 15' east longitude and between 9° 50' and 10° 40' of the north latitude.

== Organisation ==
On 14 January 1975, Pudukkottai was organised as a separate district comprising the former Pudukkottai Division of Tiruchirappalli district with some additions from Thanjavur district. At present, this district is composed of three revenue divisions, namely, Pudukkottai, Aranthangi and Illupur and eleven taluks, namely, Kulathur, Illuppur, Alangudi, Pudukkottai, Gandarvakottai, Thirumayam, Aranthangi, Ponnamaravathi, Karambakudi, Avudaiyarkoil and Manamelkudi. There are 762 revenue villages.

== Demographics ==
Historical population

Year	Pop.	±% p.a.
1901	547,620	—
1911	583,413	+0.64%
1921	607,933	+0.41%
1931	573,642	−0.58%
1941	622,706	+0.82%
1951	704,102	+1.24%

Year	Pop.	±% p.a.
1961	750,461	+0.64%
1971	947,351	+2.36%
1981	1,156,813	+2.02%
1991	1,327,148	+1.38%
2001	1,459,601	+0.96%
2011	1,618,345	+1.04%

Religions in Pudukkottai district (2011)
Religion	Percent
Hinduism	88.29%
Islam	7.06%
Christianity	4.50%
Other or not stated	0.15%

According to 2011 census, Pudukkottai district had a population of 1,618,345 with a sex-ratio of 1,015 females for every 1,000 males, much above the national average of 929. 19.55% of the population lived in urban areas. A total of 179,688 were under the age of six, constituting 91,696 males and 87,992 females. Scheduled Castes and Scheduled Tribes accounted for 17.60% and 0.08% of the population, respectively. The average literacy of the district was 68.62%, compared to the national average of 72.99%. The district had a total of 387,679 households. There were a total of 761,693 workers, comprising 192,462 cultivators, 234,344 main agricultural labourers, 10,170 in house hold industries, 203,272 other workers, 121,445 marginal workers, 16,808 marginal cultivators, 70,805 marginal agricultural labourers, 3,771 marginal workers in household industries and 30,061 other marginal workers. Tamil is the predominant language, spoken by 99.23% of the population.

== Politics ==
District	No.	Constituency	Name	Party	Alliance	Remarks
Pudukkottai	178	Gandarvakkottai (SC)	N. Subramanian	TVK	TVK+	
Pudukkottai	179	Viralimalai	C. Vijayabaskar	AIADMK	AIADMK+	Supported TVK
Pudukkottai	179	Viralimalai	Vacant			On 16 June 2026, resigned from office
Pudukkottai	180	Pudukkottai	V. Muthuraja	DMK	SPA	
Pudukkottai	181	Thirumayam	S. Regupathy	DMK	SPA	
Pudukkottai	182	Alangudi	Siva V. Meyyanathan	DMK	SPA	
Pudukkottai	183	Aranthangi	J. Mohamed Farvas	TVK	TVK+	Cabinet Minister

== See also ==
- List of districts of Tamil Nadu
