= Avadaiyarkoil block =

Indian revenue block

Avadaiyarkoil block is a revenue block in Pudukkottai district, Tamil Nadu, India. It has a total of 35 panchayat villages.

== Villages in Avadaiyarkoil block ==
- Amaradakki
- Kalabam
- Karur, Pudukkottai
- Kathiramangalam
- Kavadukudi
- Keelachery
- Keelkudivattadur
- Kundagavayal
- Kunnur, Pudukkottai
- Mimisal
- Nattanipurasakudi
- Okkur, Pudukkottai
- Palavarasan
- Pandipathiram
- Perunavalur
- Ponnamangalam
- Ponpethi
- Poovalur, Pudukkottai
- Punniyavayal
- Puthambur
- Sattiyakudi
- Senganam
- Sirumarudur
- Thalanur
- Theeyadur
- Theeyur
- Thirupperundurai
- Thiruppunavasal
- Thondamandendal
- Thunjanur
- Veeramangalam
- Velivayal
- Velvarai
- Vettanur
- Vilanur
