= Perunavalur =

Village in India

- village
- Country: India
- State: Tamil Nadu
- District: Pudukkottai

Languages
  - Official: Tamil
- Time zone: UTC+5:30 (IST)

Perunavalur is a village in the Avadaiyarkoil revenue block of Pudukkottai district, Tamil Nadu, India.

It is located between Veeramangalam and Avudaiyarkovil. This place was popularly known as big novel place. In this place a government arts and science college was situated. Here a famous Sri Kannudaiyanayaki temple commonly known as Kannama Kovil and sivan, Vinayagar temple, Kuppiyamma temple, Muniswarar temple, Saambaan temple and mosque were situated.
