= Theeyur =

Village in India

- village
- Country: India
- State: Tamil Nadu
- District: Pudukkottai

Population (2001)
  - Total: 201

Languages
  - Official: Tamil
- Time zone: UTC+5:30 (IST)

Theeyur is a village in the Avadaiyarkoilrevenue block of Pudukkottai district, Tamil Nadu, India.

== Demographics ==
As per the 2001 census, Theeyur had a total population of 201 with 92 males and 109 females. Out of the total population 127 people were literate.
