= Thiruppunavayil =

- Location in Tamil Nadu

Religion
- Affiliation: Hinduism
- Deity: Shiva

Location
- State: Tamil Nadu
- Country: India
- Coordinates: 9°53′39″N 79°3′49″E

Architecture
- Type: Dravidian architecture

The Thiruppunavayil Shiva temple is located on the seashore in Thiruppunavasal near Pudukkotai in Tamil Nadu. This temple is regarded as the 7th of the Tevara Stalams in the Pandya region of Tamil Nadu. The presiding deity is called Vruddhapureeswarar or Pazhampathinathar.

== Mythology ==
Thiruppunavayil has it that the 4 Vedas, Bhrama, Lakshmi and Mahavishnu along with Indra, Surya, Chandra, Yama, Airavatam, Vasishta and Agasthyar worshipped Shiva here.

All of the 14 shrines in the Pandya Kingdom sung by the Nayanmars are said to manifest themselves here. There are 14 Shivalingams in this temple.

Thiruppunavayil kovil is a parihara sthalam for Mangala dosha.

It is belief that only blessed will be called to visit this place. Kanchi Maha Periyava held this place in high regards. On his visit to the place, before entering the kshetram he removed his sandals in reverence.

== Poems on this temple ==
It is one of the shrines of the 275 Paadal Petra Sthalams. Sambandar, Appar and Sundarar composed the thevara Pathigam on the lord in this temple. It is one of the shrines of the Vaippu Sthalams.

== See also ==
- Virutthapurisvarar Temple, Annavasal
