= Keelachery =

Village in India

Keezhacherry
- village
- Country: India
- State: Tamil Nadu
- District: [kancipuram district]

Population (2001)
  - Total: 519

Languages
  - Official: Tamil
- Time zone: UTC+5:30 (IST)

Keezhacherry is a village in the Lattur revenue block of kanchipuram district, Tamil Nadu, India.

== Demographics ==
As per the 2001 census, Keezhacherry had a total population of 519 with 278 males and 241 females. Out of the total population 323 people were literate.
