= Kalabam =

Village in India

Coordinates: 10°24′N 78°57′E

- village
- Interactive map of Kalabam
- Country: India
- State: Tamil Nadu
- District: Pudukkottai

Population (2001)
  - Total: 1,664

Languages
  - Official: Tamil
- Time zone: UTC+5:30 (IST)

Kalabam is a village in the Avadaiyarkoilrevenue block of Pudukkottai district, Tamil Nadu, India.

== Demographics ==
As per the 2001 census, Kalabam had a total population of 1664 with 791 males and 873 females. Out of the total population 1121 people were literate.
