= Poovalur, Pudukkottai =

Village in India

Poovalur
- village
- Country: India
- State: Tamil Nadu
- District: Pudukkottai

Population (2001)
  - Total: 384

Languages
  - Official: Tamil
- Time zone: UTC+5:30 (IST)

Poovalur is a village in the Avadaiyarkoilrevenue block of Pudukkottai district, Tamil Nadu, India.

== Demographics ==
As per the 2001 census, Poovalur had a total population of 384 with 178 males and 206 females. Out of the total population 233 people were literate.
