= Virutthapurisvarar Temple, Annavasal =

Shiva temple in Tamil Nadu, India

Coordinates: 9.8941°N 79.0636°E

Virutthapurisvarar Temple is a Siva temple in Annavasal in Pudukottai district in Tamil Nadu (India).

== Vaippu Sthalam ==
Also known as Thiruppunavayil it is one of the shrines of the Vaippu Sthalams sung by Tamil Saivite Nayanar Appar. It is one of the shrines of the 275 Paadal Petra Sthalams. Sambandar, Appar and Sundarar composed the thevara Pathigam on the lord in this temple.

== Presiding deity ==
The presiding deity is Virutthapurisvarar. The Goddess is known as Dharmasamvarthini.

== Annanvayil ==
This place was known as Annanvayil. The temple is located in Pudukottai-Viralimalai road, via Manapparai, just before Annavasal.

== Photogallery ==
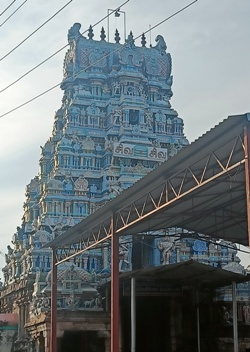
Rajagopura

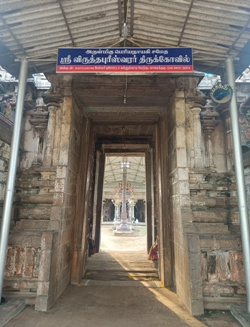
Main entrance

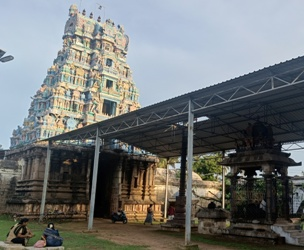
Prakara

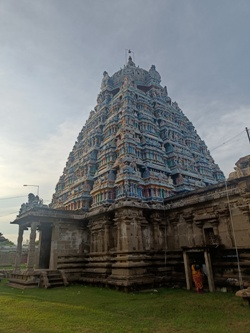
Vimana of the presiding deity

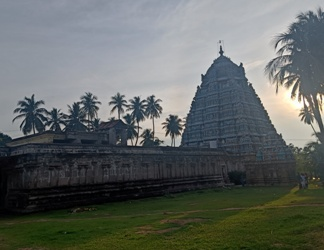
Prakara

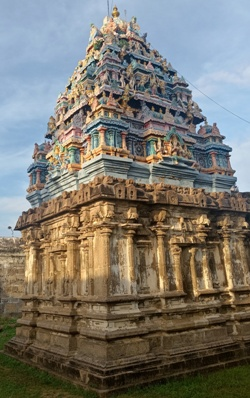
Vimana of the goddess
