= Veeramangalam =

- village
- Country: India
- State: Tamil Nadu
- District: Pudukkottai

Population (2001)
  - Total: 1,807

Languages
  - Official: Tamil
- Time zone: UTC+5:30 (IST)

Veeramangalam is a village in the Avadaiyarkoilrevenue block of Pudukkottai district, Tamil Nadu, India.

== Known for ==
Village Cooking Channel

== Demographics ==
As per the 2001 census, Veeramangalam had a total population of 1807 with 824 males and 983 females. Out of the total population 953 people were literate.
