= Kavadukudi =

Village in India

Coordinates: 9°49′N 78°48′E

- village
- Interactive map of Kavadukudi
- Country: India
- State: Tamil Nadu
- District: Pudukkottai

Population (2001)
  - Total: 283

Languages
  - Official: Tamil
- Time zone: UTC+5:30 (IST)

Kavadukudi is a village in the Avadaiyarkoil revenue block of Pudukkottai district, Tamil Nadu, India.

== Demographics ==
As per the 2001 census, Kavadukudi had a total population of 283 with 130 males and 153 females. Out of the total population 182 people were literate.
