= Arasanagaripattinam =

Village in India

Arasanagaripattiam Arasanagari
- village
- Nickname: Arasai
- Interactive map of Arasanagaripattiam
- Coordinates: 9.89256°N 79.12035°E
- Country: India
- State: Tamil Nadu
- District: Pudukkottai

Government
  - Panchayat President: Mohamed Iqbal

Population (2001)
  - Total: 1,500

Languages
  - Official: Tamil
- Time zone: UTC+5:30 (IST)
- Postal code: 614621
- Website: www.arasanagaripattinam.com

Arasanagaripattinam is a village in the Avadaiyarkoilrevenue block of Pudukkottai district, Tamil Nadu, India.

== Demographics ==
As per the 2001 census, Arasanagaripattinam had a total population of 8174 with 3969 males and 4205 females. Out of the total population 5503 people were literate.

Arasanagaripattinam: For a Chola king, the place where the Special Action Soldiers stayed to intimidate the short-lived monarch who refused to pay the bribe, Arasan Adi means the king's soldiers. Maruvi became known as 'Arasanari' today as 'Arasanari' in the course of 'Arasan Adi'.
