= Kundagavayal =

Village in India

- village
- Country: India
- State: Tamil Nadu
- District: Pudukkottai

Population (2001)
  - Total: 953

Languages
  - Official: Tamil
- Time zone: UTC+5:30 (IST)

Kundagavayal is a village in the Avadaiyarkoil revenue block of Pudukkottai district, Tamil Nadu, India.

== About Kundagavayal ==
According to Census 2011, the location code or village code of Kundagavayal village is 639762. Kundagavayal village is located in Aranthangi Tehsil of Pudukkottai district in Tamil Nadu, India. It is situated 6 km (3.72 mi) away from sub-district headquarter Aranthangi and 40 km (24.85 mi) away from district headquarter Pudukkottai. As per 2009 stats, Kundagavayal village is also a gram panchayat.

The total geographical area of village is 189.21 hectares. Kundagavayal has a total population of 258. There are about 66 houses in Kundagavayal village. Aranthangi is nearest town to Kundagavayal.

Total Population - 953

Male Population - 473

Female Population - 480

== Transport ==
Private mini Bus Service connects the village to the Town aranthangi.

Private and government bus service near 1 km (0.6 mi) in Duraiyarasapuram connects all town.

Railway Station Available within 5 km (3.1 mi) distance at Aranthagi which connects the Karaikudi- pattukottai.

== List of educational institutions nearby ==
=== Primary schools ===
- Government Primary School, Kundagavayal
- Government Primary School, Duraiyarasapuram
- Government Primary School, Keelacheri
- Government Higher secondary schools
- Government Boys Higher Secondary School, Aranthangi
- Government Girls Higher Secondary School, Aranthangi

=== Private schools ===
- Ali Jainam Jamaath Oriental Arabic Higher Secondary School, Aranthangi
- Doctors School, Melappattu
- Ideal matric Hr. Sec. School, Aranthangi
- Annai Meenachi Natchiar Matriculation Higher secondary School, Aranthangi
- Laurel Matriculation Higher Secondary School, Aranthangi
- National Matric Higher Secondary School, Aranthangi
- Selection Matriculation Higher Secondary School, Aranthangi
- Shivaani Vidhyaa Mandir, Aranthangi
- St.John's Matric Hr. Sec. School, Arantangi
- St.Joseph Nursery and Primary School, Aranthangi
- T.E.L.C Middle school, Aranthangi
- Thayagam Matriculation Hr. Sec. School, Aranthangi
- Vestley group of institutions, Aranthangi
- Yazh Academy, Silattur, Aranthangi

=== Technical Colleges ===
- Government polytechnic College, Aranthangi
- Government Arts and Science College Aranthangi
- M.S. Polytechnic college
- Bharathidasan University Model College, Punniavasal
- Annai Khadeeja Arts And Science College, Mumpalai

== Pond areas ==
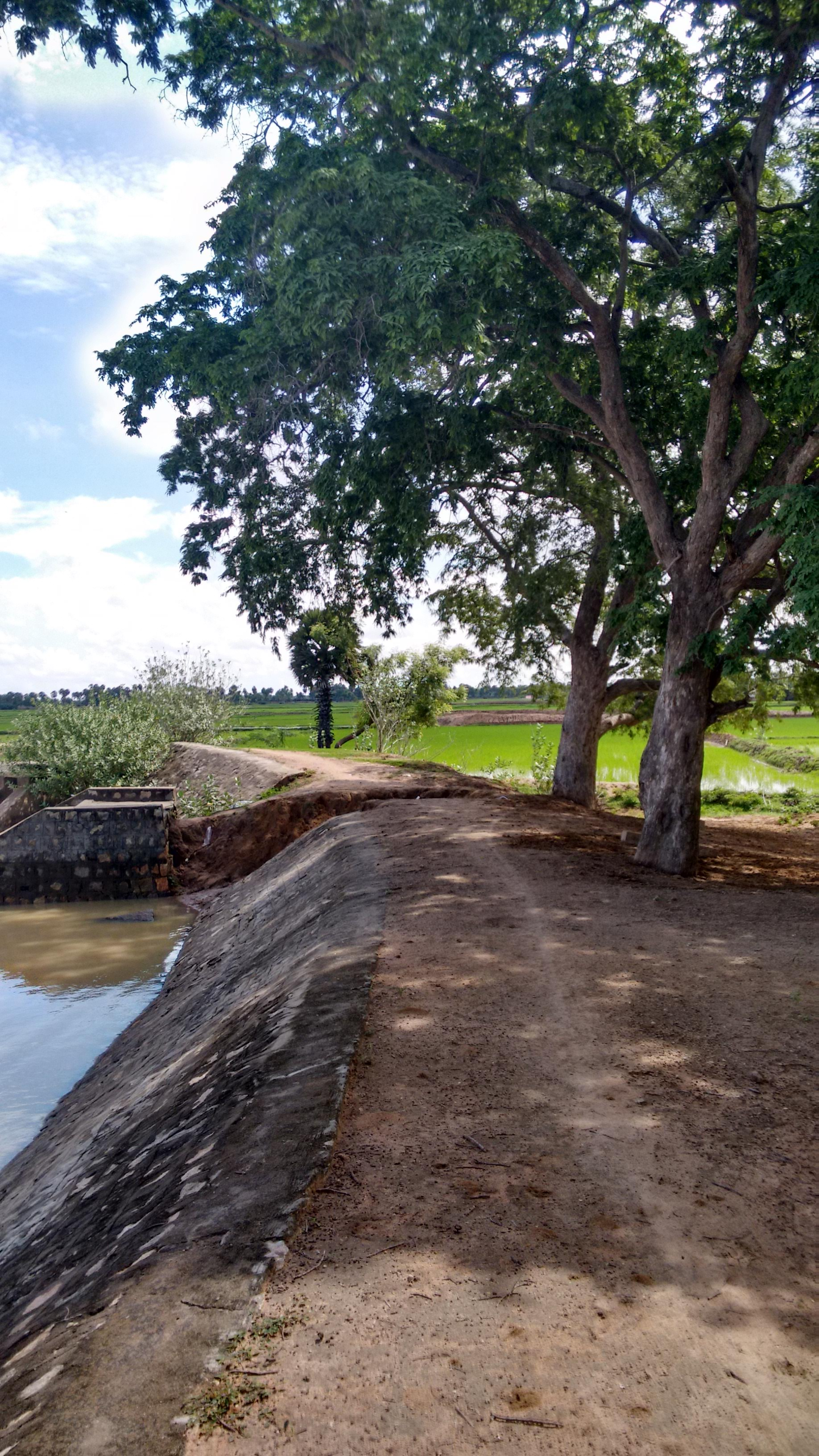
Thattan mudi lake

== Pongal Celebrations ==
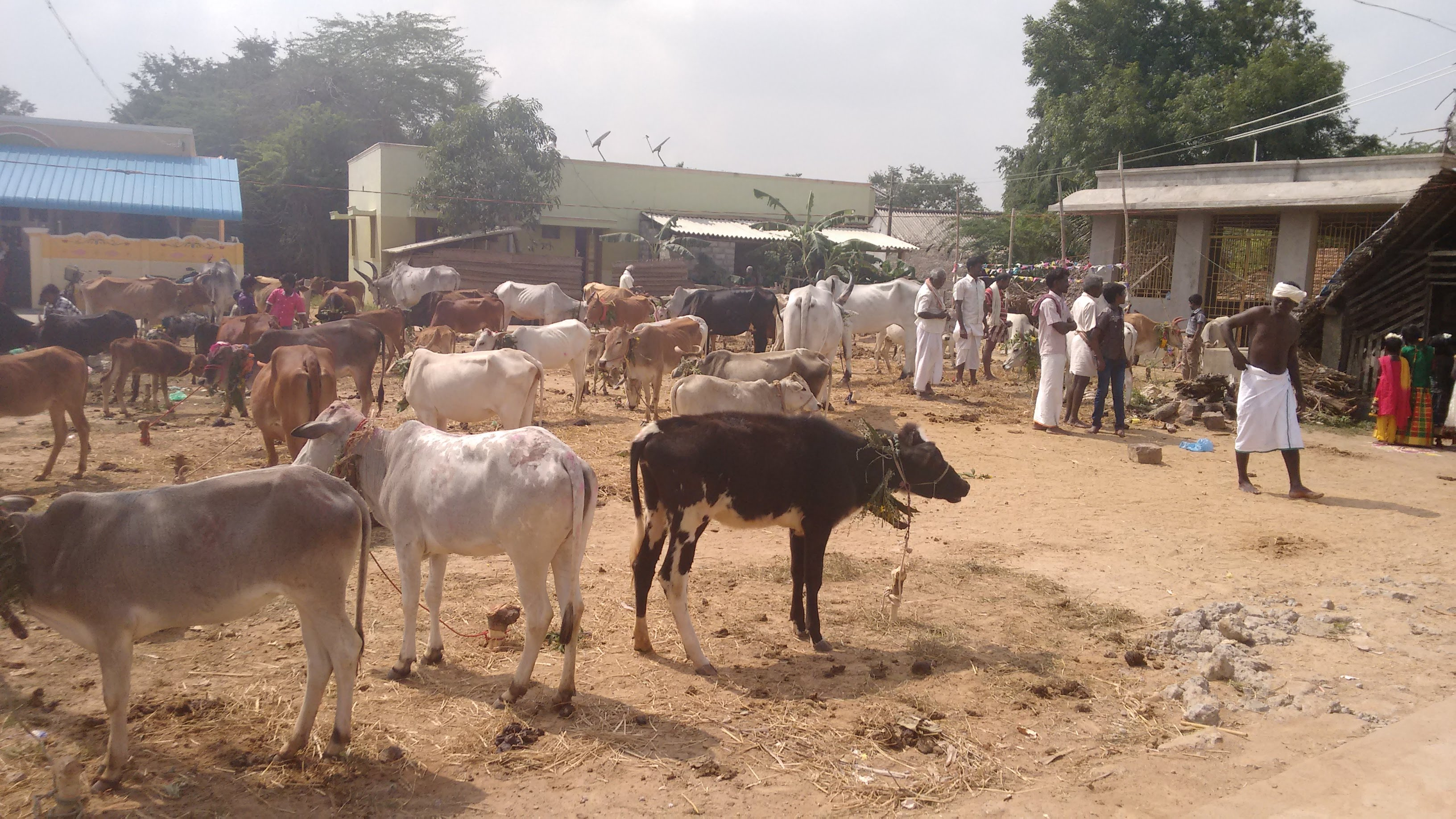
Assemble cattle

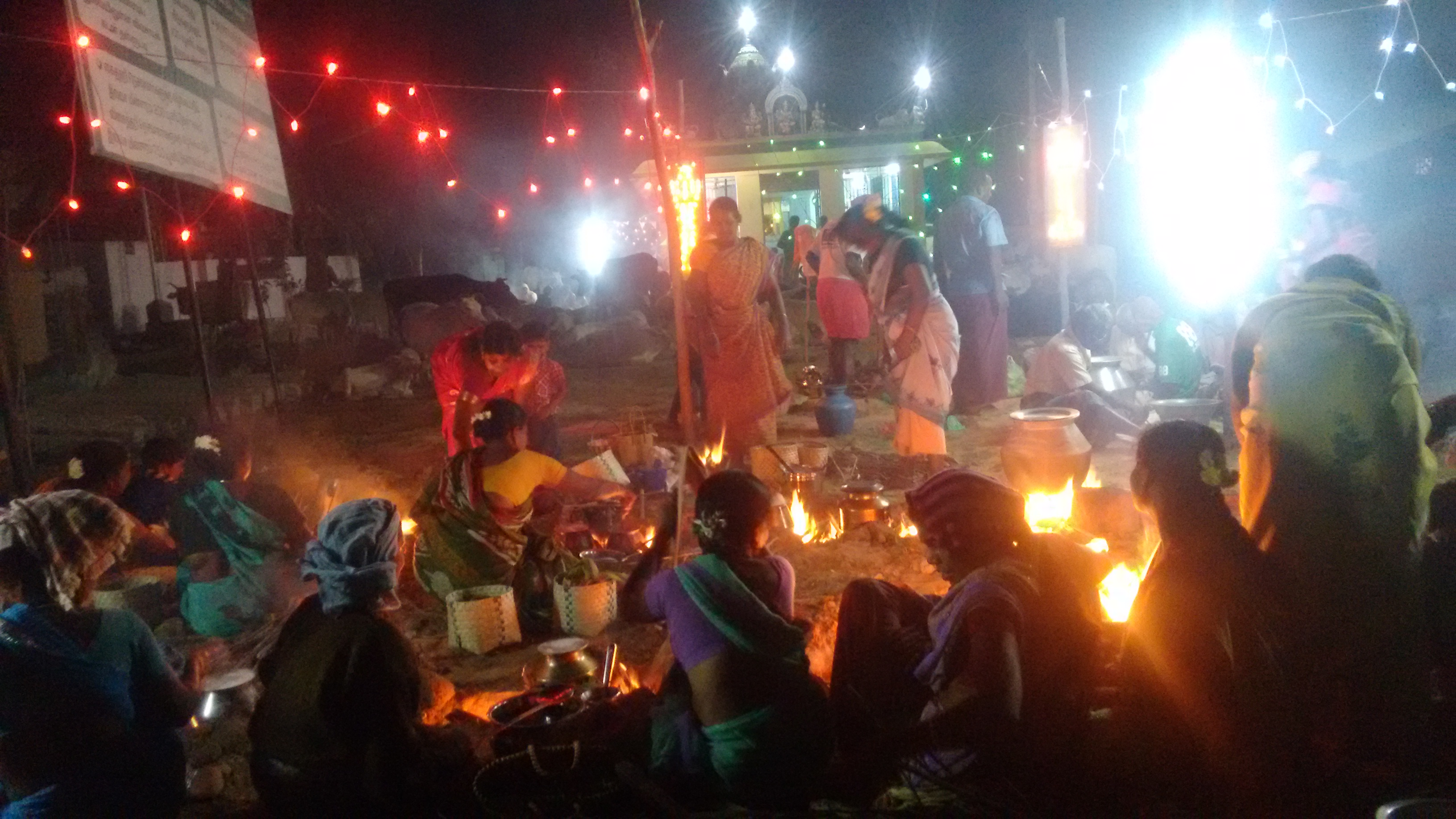
cooking pongal for cattle

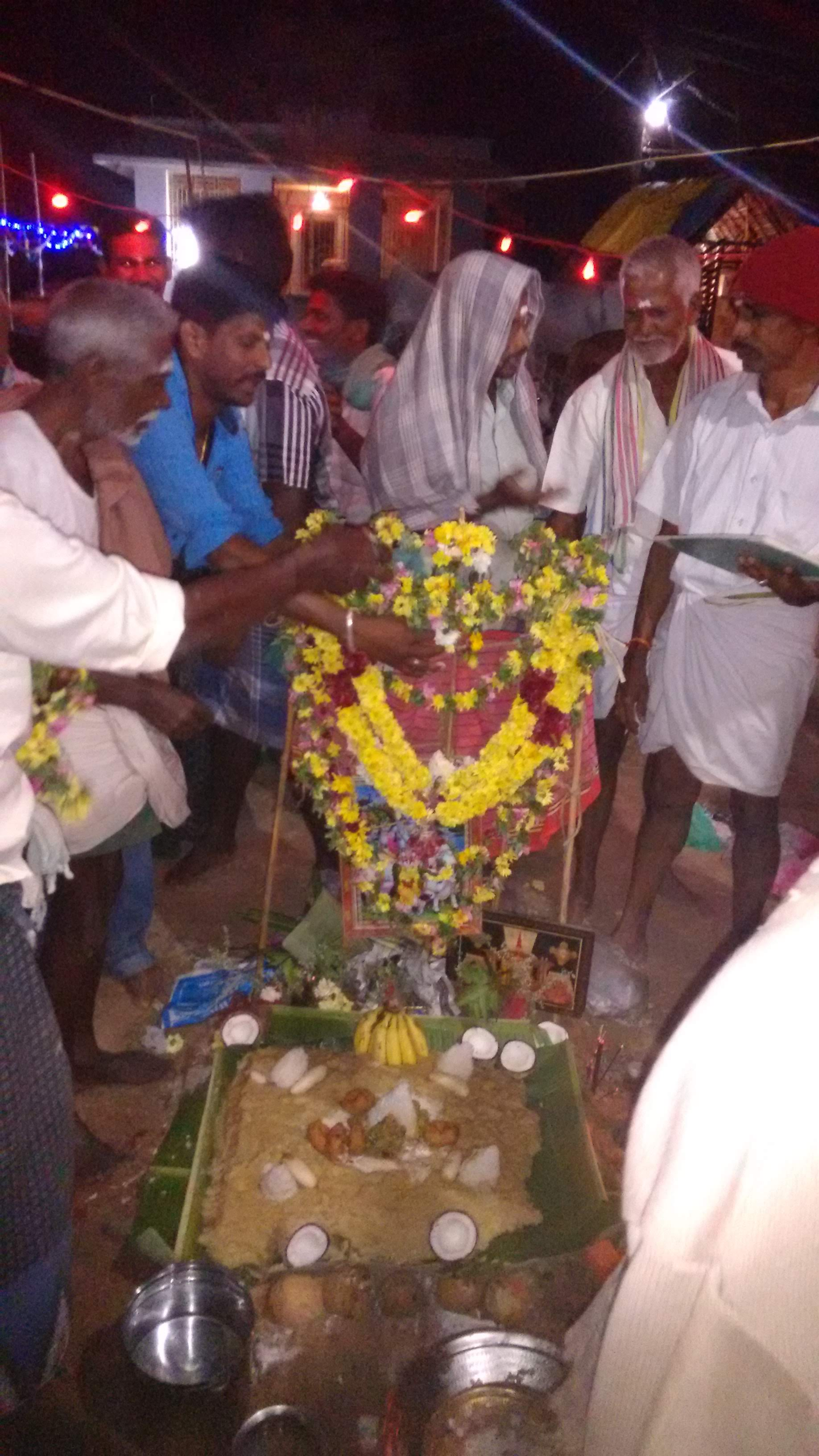
Worship for cattle with pongal

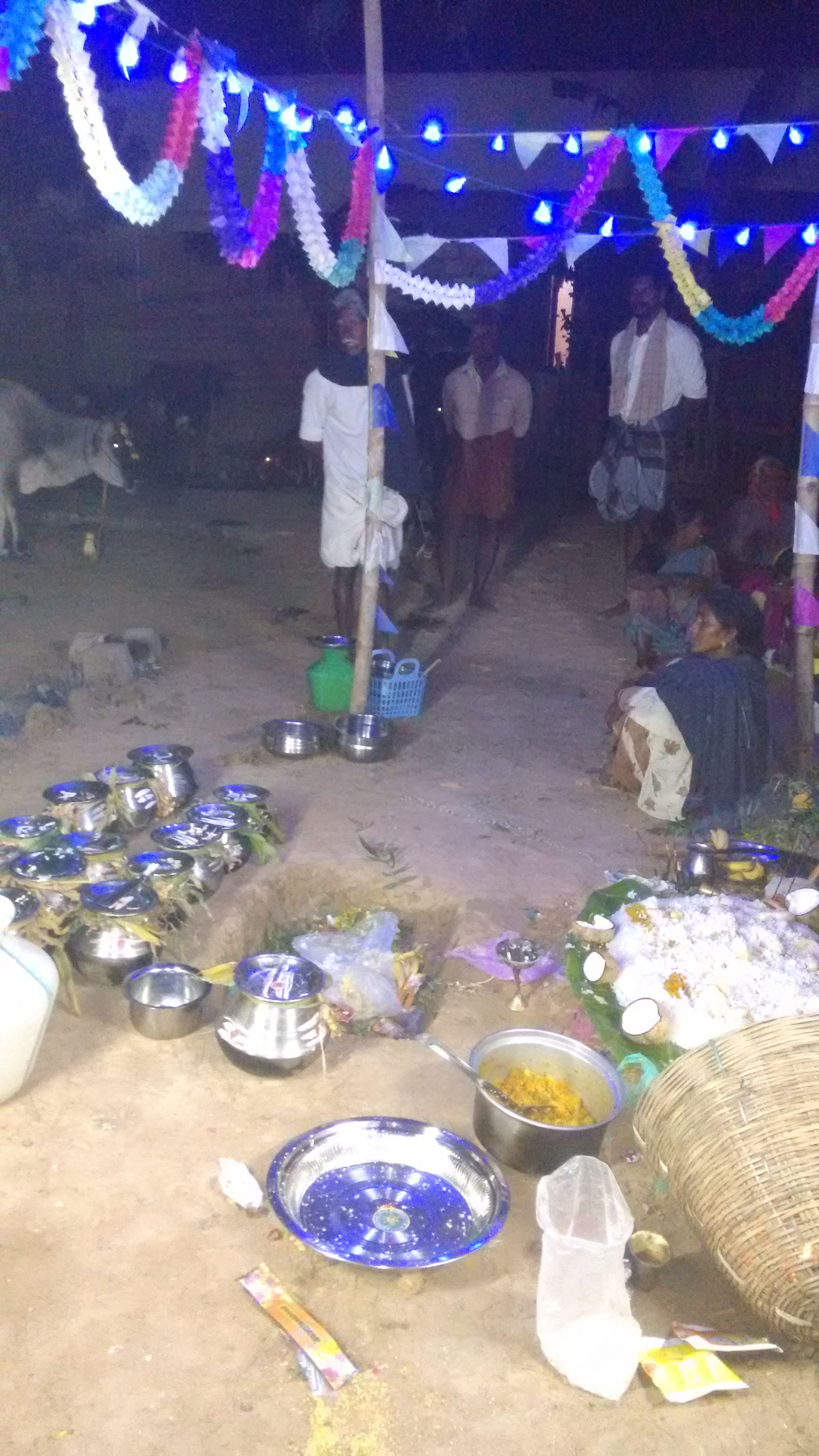
Split the prasadham for cattle owners

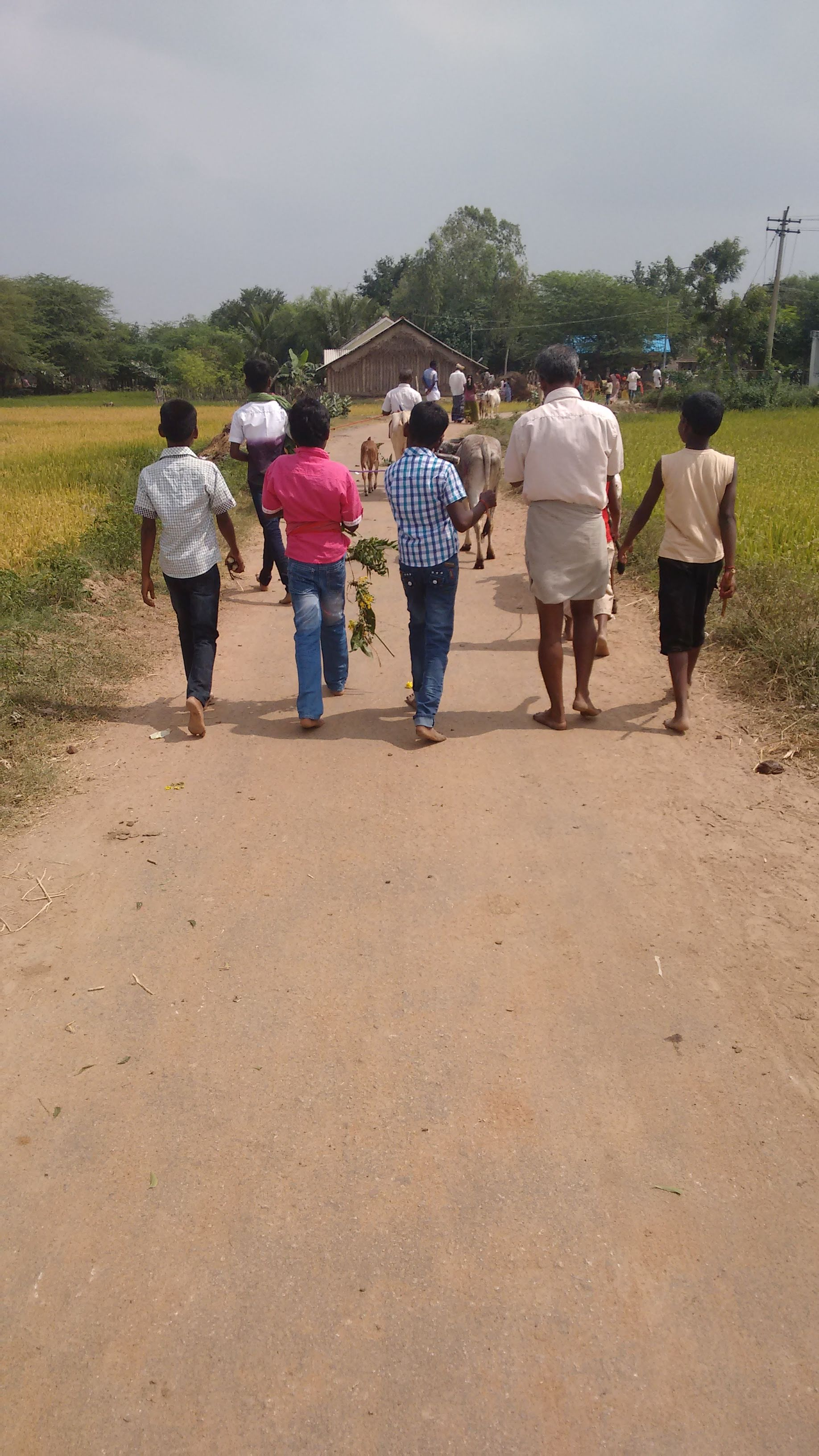
Cattle back to home

== Pillayar Temple ==
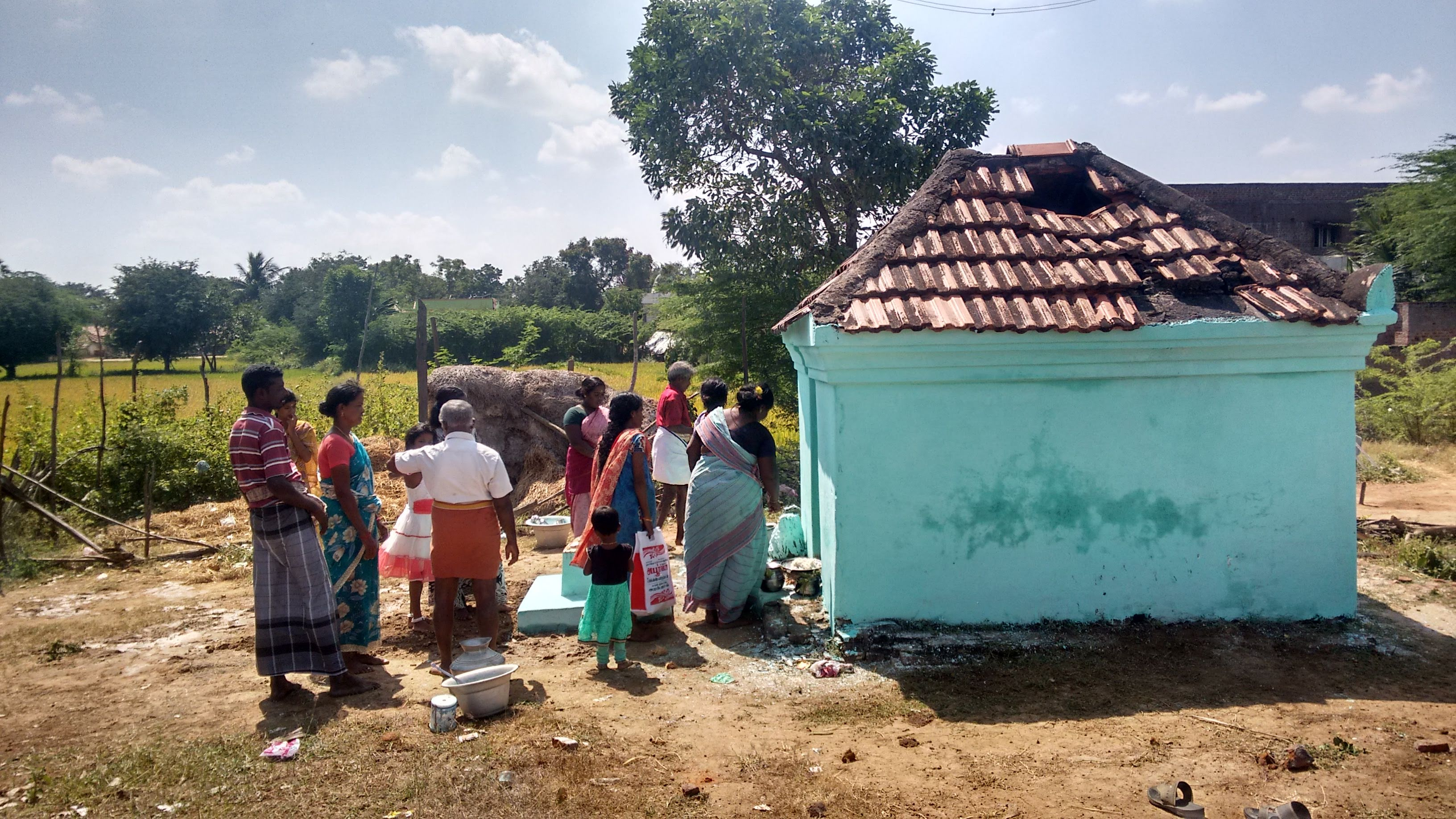
Side view Before 2014

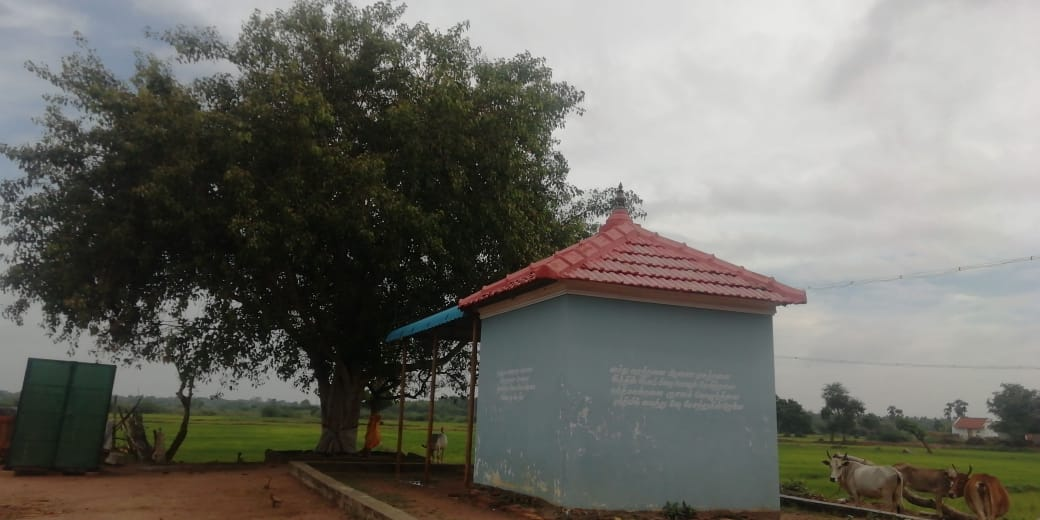
Rebuild Backside view During 2014

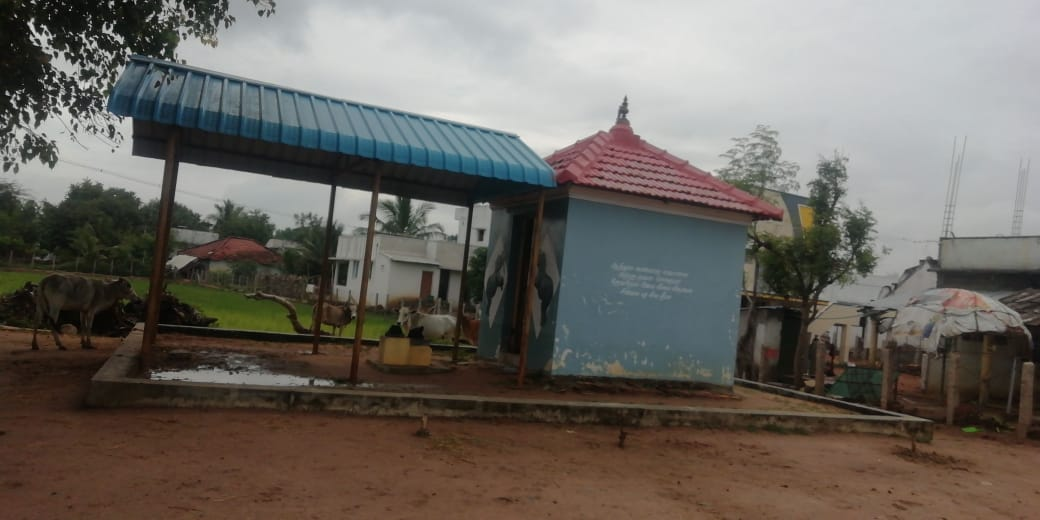
Rebuild Side view During 2014

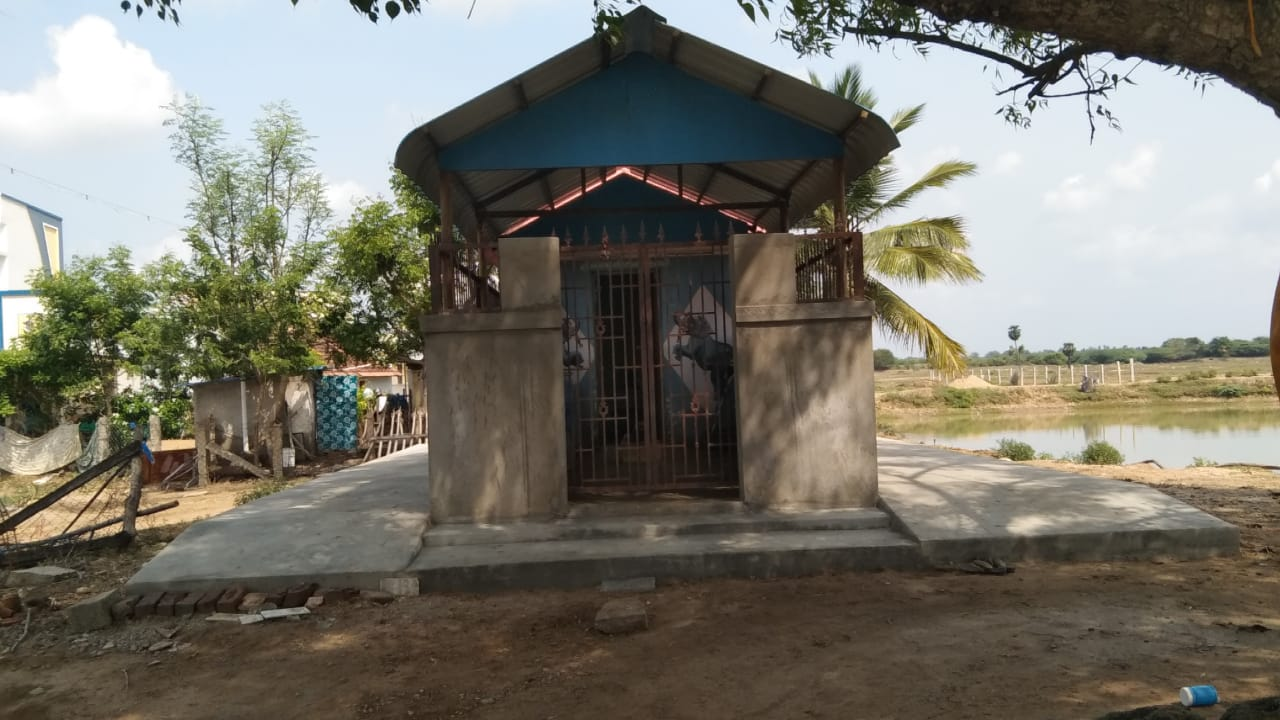
Front view during 2024

== Pidari Amman Temple ==
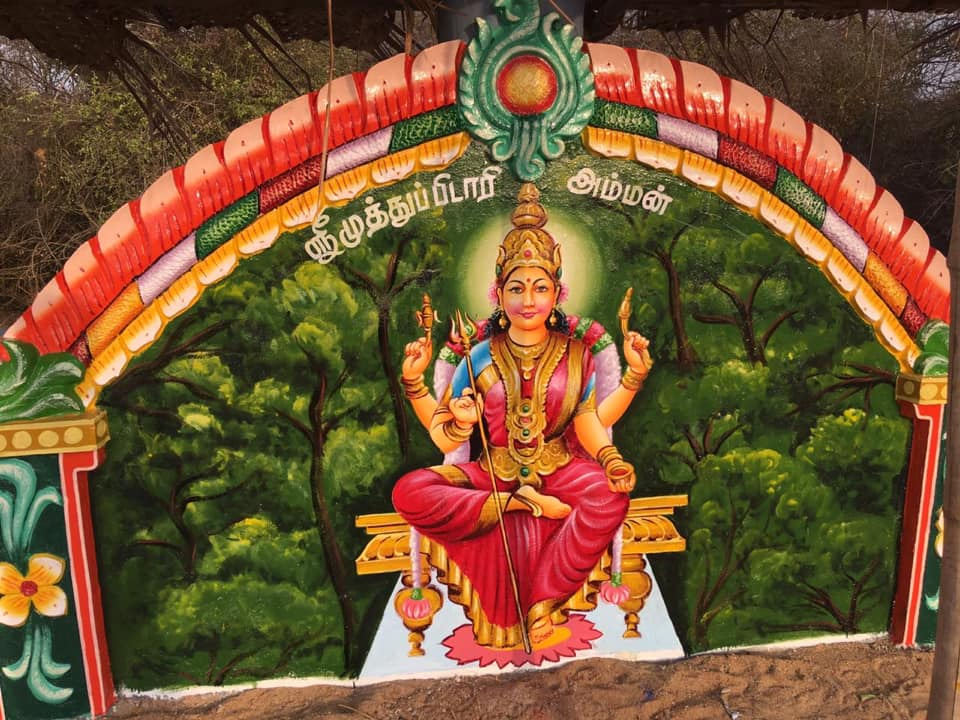
Pidari art

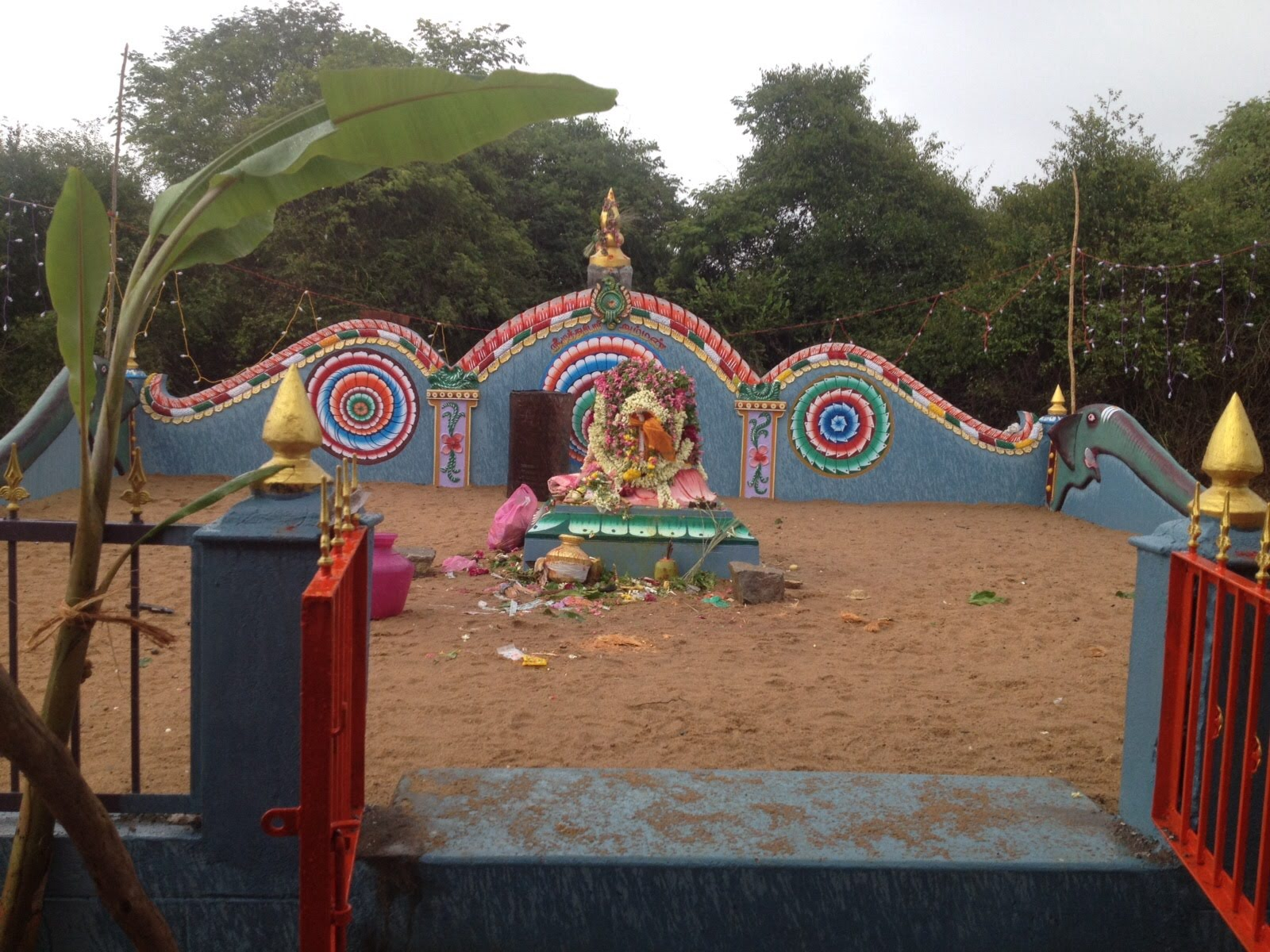
Front view

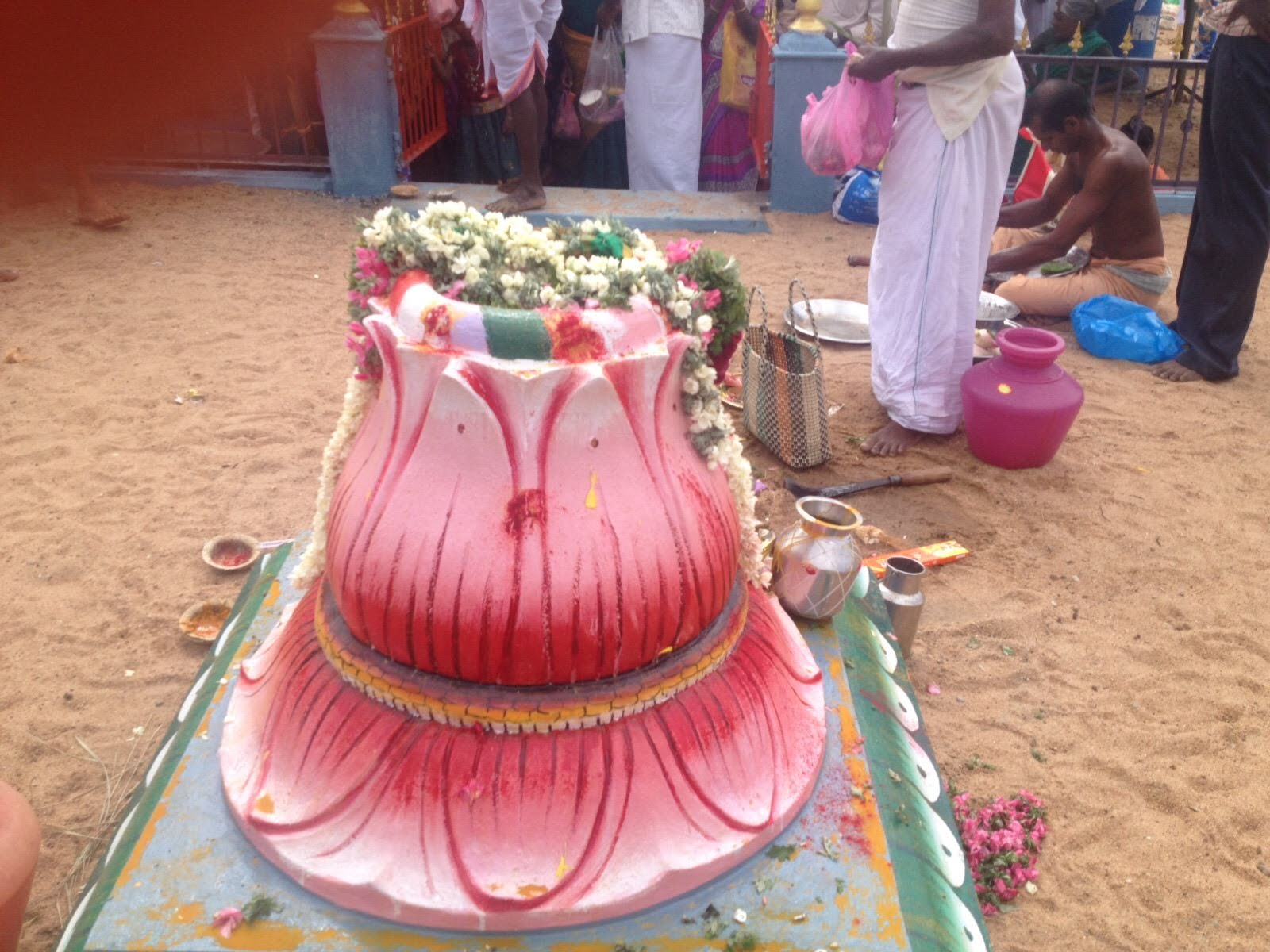
Snake peedam

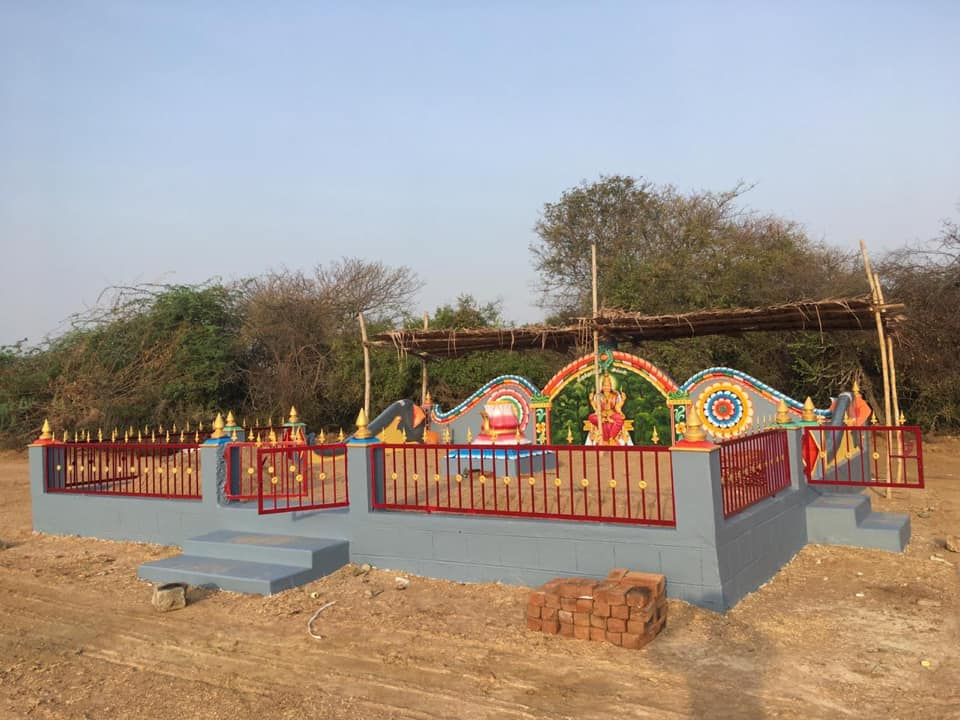
Cross view

== Ayyanar Temple ==
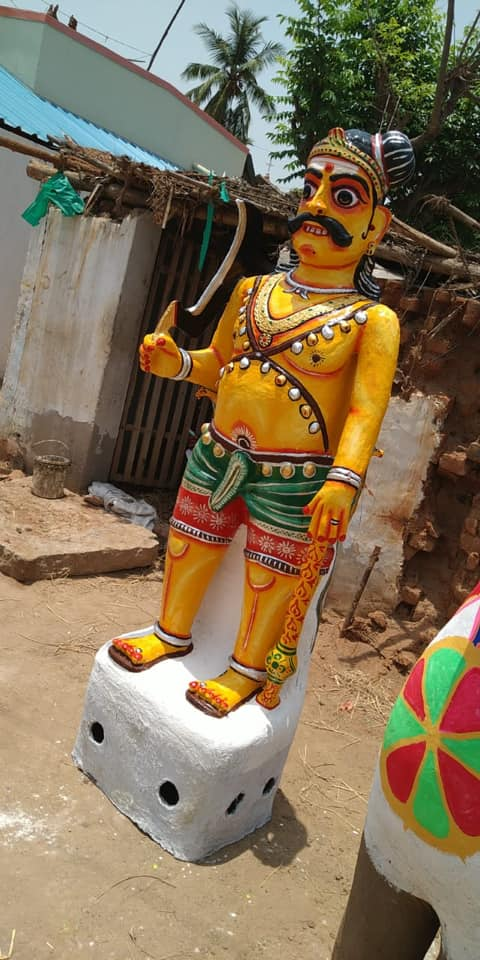
Ayyanar idols in kallusandhu

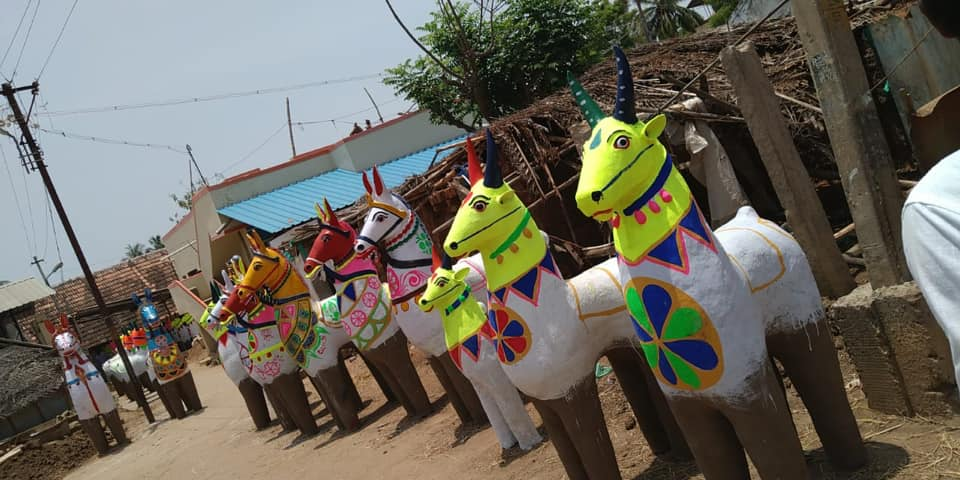
Horse idols in kallusandhu

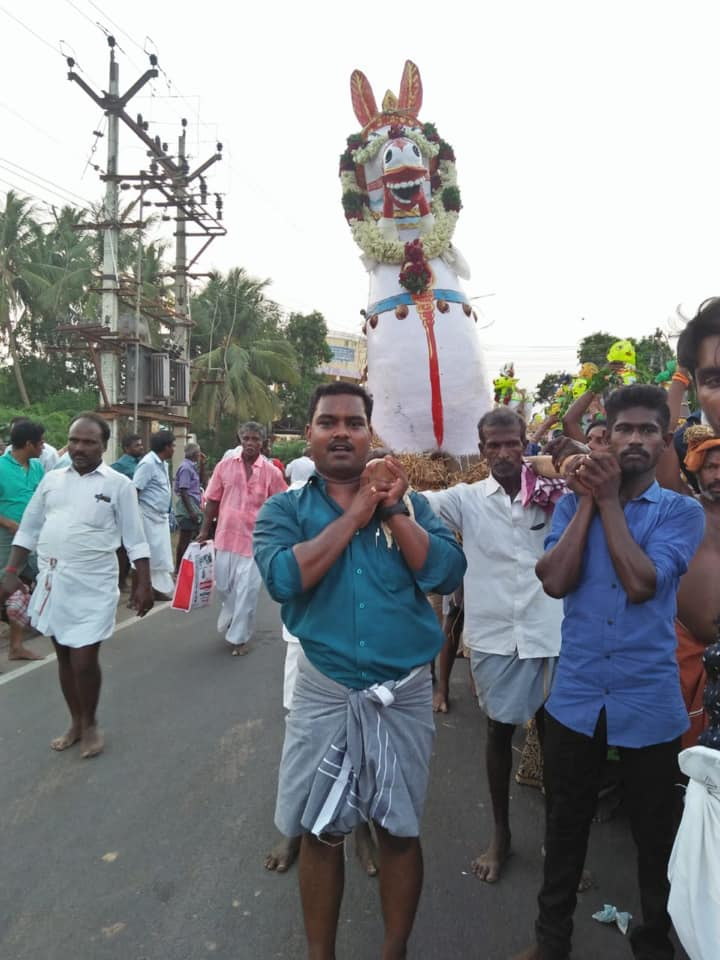
Carrying from Kallu sandhu to Kundagavayal

== Kamatchi Amman Temple ==
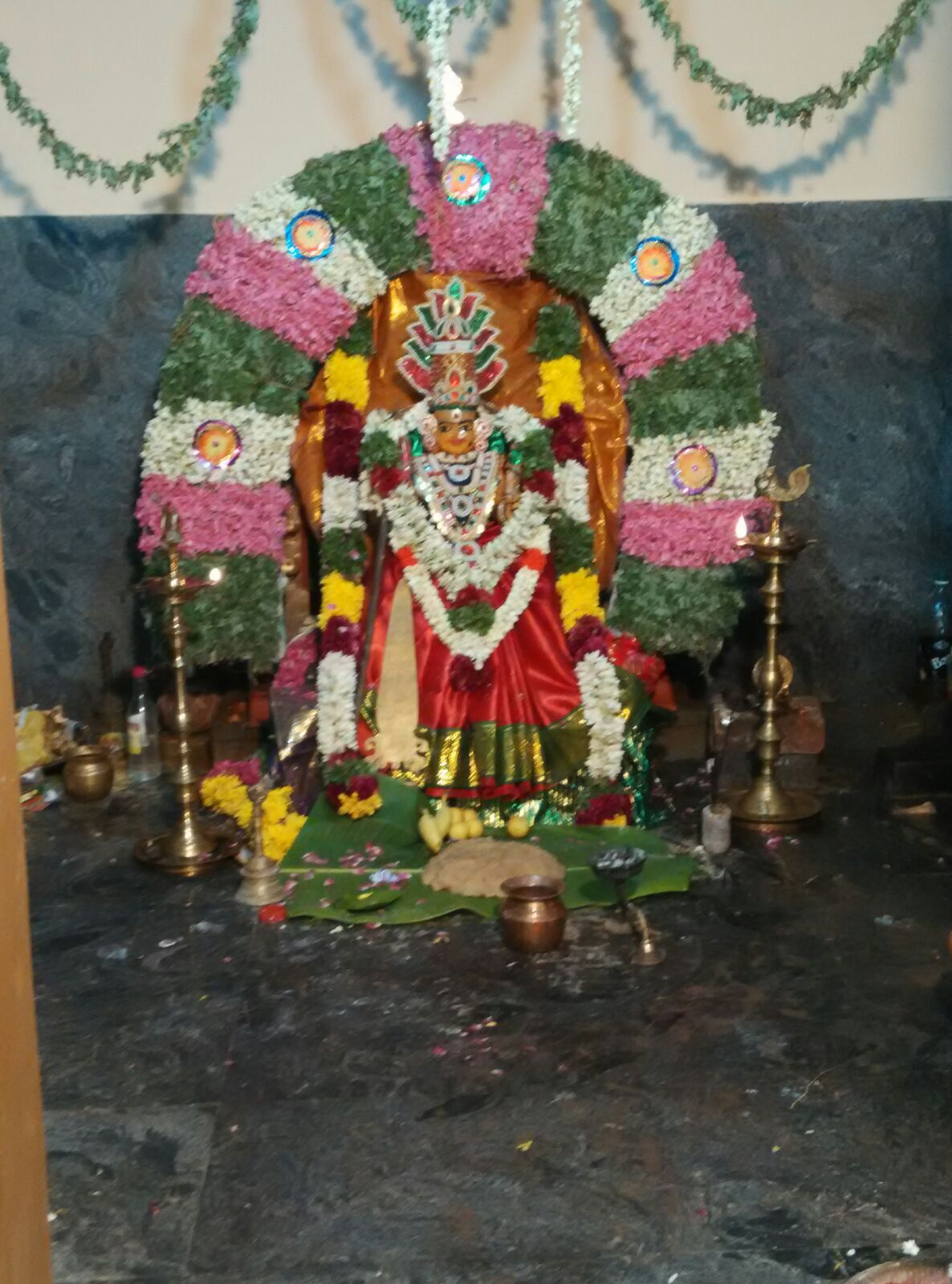
Alangaram

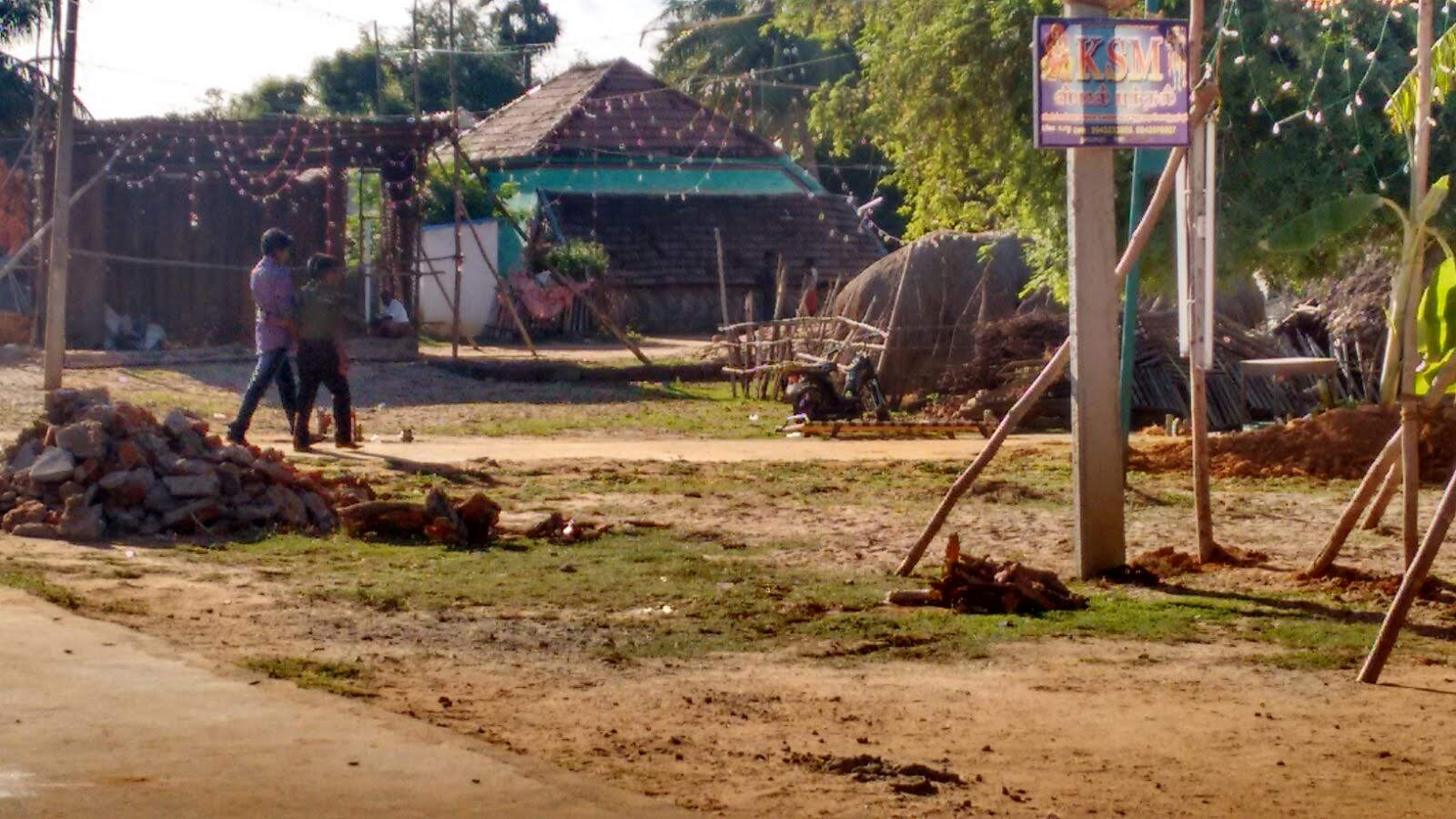
Drama stage

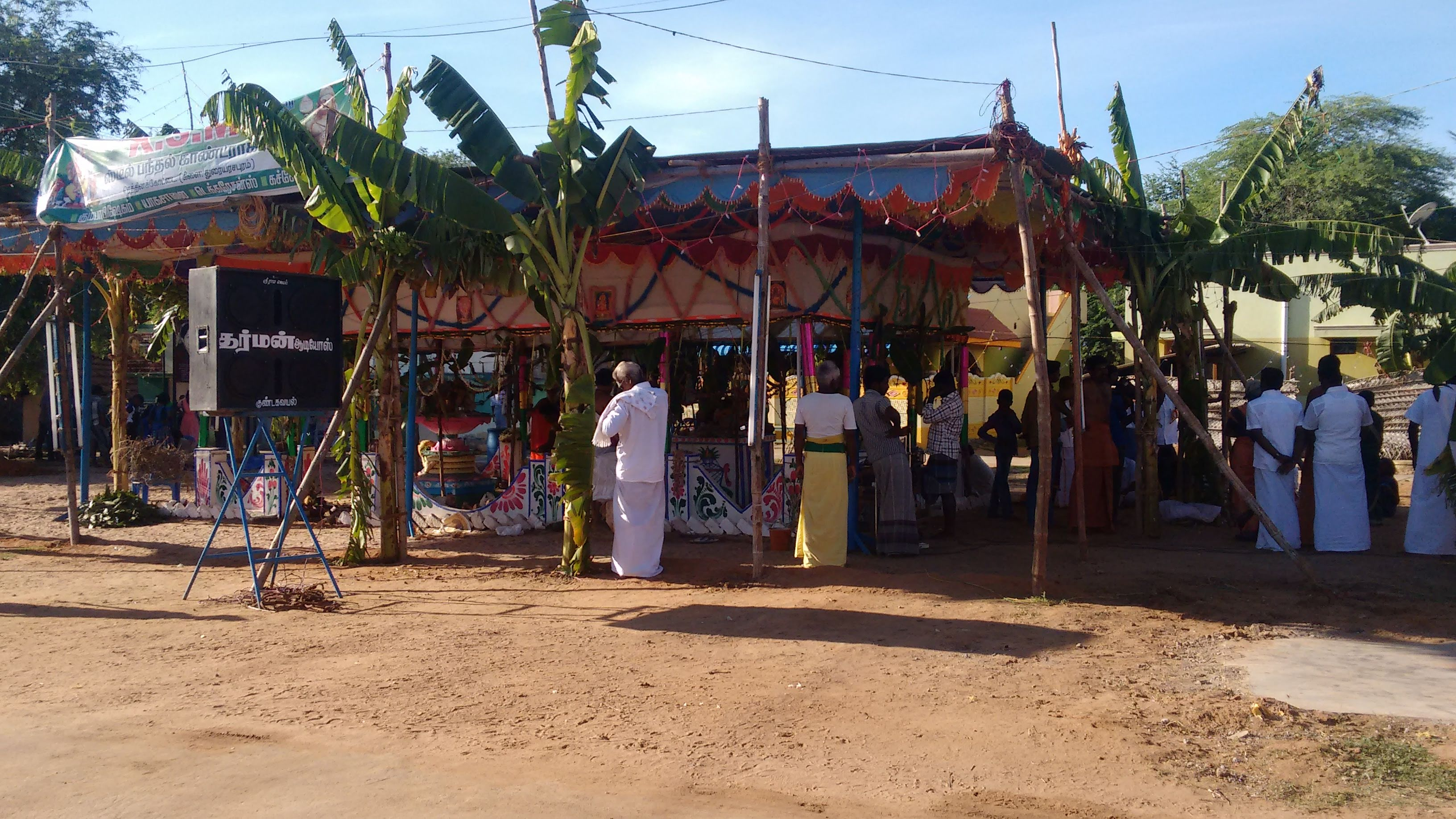
Function time

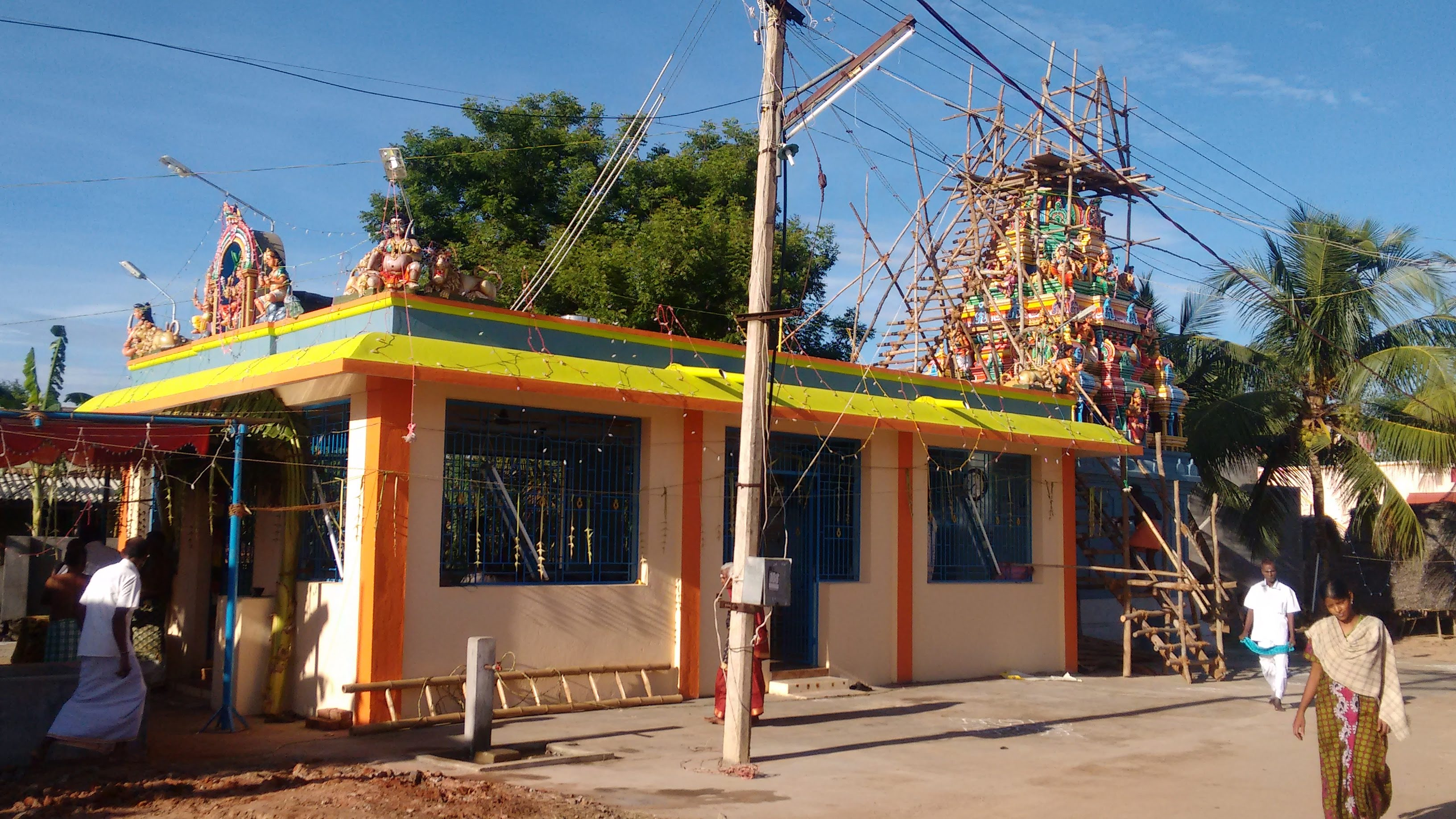
Side view

== Nearby Villages of Kundagavayal panchayat ==
- Veeramangalam
- Perunavalur
- Panjatti
- Amanji
- Allaraimelvayal
- Keelacheri
- Sivandankadu
- Vengur
- Sinamangalam
- Arunachalapuram
- Mannakudi

== Demographics ==
As per the 2001 census, Kundagavayal had a total population of 953 with 473 males and 480 females. Out of the total population 732 people were literate.
