= Thondamandendal =

Village in India

- village
- Interactive map of Thondamandendal
- Coordinates: 10.006°N 79.076°E
- Country: India
- State: Tamil Nadu
- District: Pudukkottai

Languages
  - Official: Tamil
- Time zone: UTC+5:30 (IST)

Thondamandendal is a village in the Avadaiyarkoilrevenue block of Pudukkottai district, Tamil Nadu, India.
