= Velivayal =

Coordinates: 10°18′N 79°20′E

- village
- Interactive map of Velivayal
- Country: India
- State: Tamil Nadu
- District: Pudukkottai

Population (2001)
  - Total: 831

Languages
  - Official: Tamil
- Time zone: UTC+5:30 (IST)

Velivayal is a village in the Avadaiyarkoilrevenue block of Pudukkottai district, Tamil Nadu, India.

== Demographics ==
As per the 2001 census, Velivayal had a total population of 831 with 406 males and 425 females. Out of the total population 485 people were literate.
