= Vettanur =

- village
- Country: India
- State: Tamil Nadu
- District: Pudukkottai

Population (2001)
  - Total: 1,790

Languages
  - Official: Tamil
- Time zone: UTC+5:30 (IST)

Vettanur is a village in the Avadaiyarkoil revenue block of Pudukkottai district, Tamil Nadu, India.

== Demographics ==
As per the 2010 census, Vettanur had a total population of 1790 with 1025 males and 988 females. Out of the total population 2 113 people were literate.
