= Thiruppunavasal =

Village in India

Coordinates: 9.8942°N 79.0636°E

- village
- Interactive map of Thiruppunavasal
- Country: India
- State: Tamil Nadu
- District: Pudukkottai

Government
  - Panchayat President: Malar Nallathambi

Population (2001)
  - Total: 3,863

Languages
  - Official: Tamil&English School =SRVHS School
- Time zone: UTC+5:30 (IST)
- Postal code: 614646
- Vehicle registration: TN55

Thiruppunavasal is a coastal village in the Avadaiyarkoil Taluk of Pudukkottai District, Tamil Nadu, India.

== Siva Temple ==
The famous Pazhampatinathar / Viruddhapureeswarar Temple which is a Thevara Paadal Petra Sthalam is located here.

== Demographics ==
As per the 2001 census, Thiruppunavasal had a total population of 3863 with 1929 males and 1934 females. Out of the total population 2792 people were literate.
