= Thalanur =

Village in India

Coordinates: 12°54′N 79°18′E

- village
- Interactive map of Thalanur
- Country: India
- State: Tamil Nadu
- District: Pudukkottai

Population (2001)
  - Total: 1,357

Languages
  - Official: Tamil
- Time zone: UTC+5:30 (IST)

Thalanur is a village in the Avadaiyarkoilrevenue block of Pudukkottai district, Tamil Nadu, India.

== Demographics ==
As per the 2001 census, Thalanur had a total population of 1357 with 655 males and 702 females. Out of the total population 883 people were literate.
