= Velvarai =

- village
- Country: India
- State: Tamil Nadu
- District: Pudukkottai

Population (2001)
  - Total: 431

Languages
  - Official: Tamil
- Time zone: UTC+5:30 (IST)

Velvarai is a village in the Avadaiyarkoilrevenue block of Pudukkottai district, Tamil Nadu, India.

== Demographics ==
As per the 2001 census, Velvarai had a total population of 431 with 192 males and 239 females. Out of the total population 252 people were literate.
