= Sirumarudur =

Village in India

- village
- Country: India
- State: Tamil Nadu
- District: Pudukkottai

Population (2001)
  - Total: 451

Languages
  - Official: Tamil
- Time zone: UTC+5:30 (IST)

Sirumarudur is a village in the Avadaiyarkoilrevenue block of Pudukkottai district, Tamil Nadu, India.

== Demographics ==
As per the 2001 census, Sirumarudur had a total population of 451 with 213 males and 238 females. Out of the total population 295 people were literate.
