= Senganam =

- Village
- Country: India
- State: Tamilnadu
- District: Pudukottai District

Languages
  - Official: Tamil
- Time zone: UTC+5:30 (IST)

Senganam is a village in the Avadaiyarkoil block of Pudukkottai district, Tamil Nadu, India.

== Demographics ==
As per the 2001 census, Senganam had a total population of 695 with 351 males and 344 females. Out of the total population, 483 people were literate.
