= Karur, Pudukkottai =

Village in India

Karur
- village
- Location in Tamil Nadu, India
- Coordinates: 9.982586°N 79.024952°E
- Country: India
- State: Tamil Nadu
- District: Pudukkottai

Population (2001)
  - Total: 2,490

Languages
  - Official: Tamil
- Time zone: UTC+5:30 (IST)

Karur is a village in the Karur Avadaiyarkoil Revenue block of Pudukkottai district, Tamil Nadu, India.

== Demographics ==
As of 2001 census, Karur had a total population of 2490 with 1225 males and 1265 females. Out of the total population 1541 people were literate.
