= Kunnur, Pudukkottai =

Village in India

Kunnur
- village
- Country: India
- State: Tamil Nadu
- District: Pudukkottai

Languages
  - Official: Tamil
- Time zone: UTC+5:30 (IST)

Kunnur is a village in the Avadaiyarkoil revenue block of Pudukkottai district, Tamil Nadu, India.
