= Vikram (2022 film) =

2022 Indian film by Lokesh Kanagaraj

- Theatrical release poster
- Directed by: Lokesh Kanagaraj
- Screenplay by: Rathna Kumar; Lokesh Kanagaraj
- Story by: Lokesh Kanagaraj
- Based on: Vikram by Sujatha
- Produced by: Kamal Haasan; R. Mahendran
- Starring: Kamal Haasan; Vijay Sethupathi; Fahadh Faasil
- Cinematography: Girish Gangadharan
- Edited by: Philomin Raj
- Music by: Anirudh Ravichander
- Production companies: Raaj Kamal Films International; Turmeric Media
- Distributed by: Red Giant Movies
- Release date: 3 June 2022
- Running time: 174 minutes
- Country: India
- Language: Tamil
- Budget: est. ₹120 crore
- Box office: est. ₹424–500 crore

Vikram (/vɪkrəm/) is a 2022 Indian Tamil-language neo-noir action thriller film directed by Lokesh Kanagaraj. Produced by Raaj Kamal Films International and Turmeric Media, it is the second instalment in Lokesh Cinematic Universe. A spiritual successor to the 1986 film of the same name, the film stars Kamal Haasan in the titular role, alongside Vijay Sethupathi and Fahadh Faasil with Narain, Kalidas Jayaram, Gayathrie, Chemban Vinod Jose, Santhana Bharathi and Elango Kumaravel in supporting roles. It revolves around the former commander of a black-ops squad's pilot batch, and his efforts to take down the runner of a drug syndicate Vetti Vagaiyara.

The film was officially announced in September 2020 under the tentative title Kamal Haasan 232, marking the actor's 232nd film as a lead actor; the official title was announced in November 2020. Principal photography commenced in July 2021. It was shot across Karaikudi, Chennai, Pondicherry, Coimbatore, and wrapped by late-February 2022. The film's soundtrack was composed by Anirudh Ravichander, with the cinematography and editing handled by Girish Gangadharan and Philomin Raj, respectively.

Vikram was released worldwide on 3 June 2022 to positive reviews from critics. By the end of its theatrical run, which lasted more than 100 days, the film was reported to have recorded the highest audience footfall in the history of Tamil cinema and grossed over ₹420 crore (US$45 million) worldwide. Vikram surpassed Baahubali 2: The Conclusion (2017) to become the highest-grossing film in Tamil Nadu, a record unbeaten till the release of Ponniyin Selvan: I the same year. The film set multiple box-office records as the fourth highest-grossing Indian film of 2022, and the second highest-grossing Tamil film of 2022, and still remains the eighth highest-grossing Tamil film of all time, the sixth highest-grossing film in Tamil Nadu.

== Plot ==
Amar, leader of a black ops squad, is called upon by Police Commissioner Jose to bring to justice a group of masked vigilantes responsible for the murder of Stephen Raj, Assistant Commissioner Prabhanjan and his foster father, Karnan. The gang killed Stephen after being arrested and subsequently released following his imprisonment for assisting criminals Adaikalam and Anbu. Amar leads the investigation by digging into Karnan's life, finding the murder out of place since Karnan was an ordinary man while the other two victims were high-ranking Narcotics Control officials.

Amar discovers Karnan's alcoholism and prostitutes whilst overprotecting his foster grandson. He found two drug containers missing that Sandhanam, owner of a larger syndicate called Vettai Vagaiyara, is hunting. The other two were meant as shipments to Rolex, Sandhanam's boss, who promised to build his government upon receiving the drugs, or Rolex would kill Sandhanam and his family. Amar discovers Karnan's addictions are cover for a covert operation he was running.

Meanwhile, Public Works Department (PWD) officer Veerapandian, and a contractor named Rudra Prathap plot to take the drug containers to Sandhanam, but the masked vigilantes arrive and kill Veerapandian at a theatre. Amar and his team capture Bejoy, one of the vigilantes. He reveals the syndicate killed his family for his role in leading a drug bust at Trichy, (Note: As depicted in Kaithi (2019)) leading him to join the vigilantes. Amar and his team realise Rudra is the vigilantes' next target, and they sneak into his daughter's wedding ceremony. Rudra invites Sandhanam for protection. The vigilantes arrive at the wedding and threaten him. Their leader captures Rudra and escapes on a bike.

Amar chases and catches the vigilantes' leader and reveals himself as Karnan, who had faked his death. Karnan kills Rudra by slitting his throat and escapes the police. It is revealed that when Prabhanjan was caught by Jose, Rudra, and Veerapandian, he was subjected to third degree torture. Even when Jose attempted to calmly tried to make Prabhanjan confess the truth, Prabhanjan spits on him and refuses to reveal. Sandhanam then arrives with his cousin Elango, and after a heated argument Sandhanam kills Prabhanjan and leaves Jose to cover up the crime. Amar tells Jose that Karnan is Vikram, former commander of the black ops' 1986 pilot batch. Only Vikram and three others―Uppiliappan, Lawrence and Tina―survived after the government tried to kill them for a botched mission in 1991. Amar also theorises Jose is Sandhanam's mole in the department and was involved in Prabhanjan's death. He places explosives at Sandhanam's bungalow which Elango accidentally activates, destroying a hidden drug base underneath. Jose hears of the bombing and informs Sandhanam about Vikram's and Amar's identities.

Vikram frees Bejoy and his team from prison, stating that his vengeance for Prabhanjan's death did not drive his actions; he wanted to bust a drug syndicate in the city. He claims Prabhanjan is his biological son and knows Vikram's true identity. Sandhanam decapitates and kills Amar's wife, Gayathri, and sends his men to kill Vikram's daughter-in-law and grandson at Prabhanjan's house. Tina, disguised as Vikram's housekeeper, Valiammal, helps Vikram defeat Sandhanam's henchmen, but is mortally wounded. Vikram goes to rescue his grandson whilst the others save his daughter-in-law. Amar then kills Jose and joins Bejoy and their allies when they arrive to find Jose dead.

At the Chennai Port, where the hidden containers are stored, Amar finds Vikram's grandson unconscious from the sound of gunfire. Sandhanam learns of the containers' location and fights Vikram. Uppiliappan and Lawrence sacrifice themselves to fend off Sandhanam's men. Vikram and a badly beaten Sandhanam bind each other and Vikram tricks Sandhanam into ordering Bejoy to signal Code Red (which Vikram told his team earlier to launch even if it meant his own death) at the port, killing Sandhanam and exploding the drug containers as Vikram manages to escape.

A week later, Adaikalam and Anbu's group meet Sandhanam's remaining subordinates, now led by Rolex, at Sassoon Docks. Adaikalam and Anbu explain Dilli's involvement in the Trichy ambush, and Rolex's group reveal Vikram's and Amar's involvement in destroying their drug syndicate. After Gayathri's funeral in Ernakulam, Amar joins Vikram's gang to continue building a drug-free society. Anbu informs Rolex that Dilli is hiding somewhere in Uttar Pradesh, and Sandhanam's men tell him Vikram's family are abroad (shown to be in San Francisco), while it is unclear whether Vikram is alive. Rolex announces a massive bounty for the execution of Vikram, Amar, Dilli, and Vikram's team as Vikram secretly watches. He walks away after learning about the bounty placed on all of them.

== Cast ==
- Kamal Haasan as Commander Arun Kumar Vikram / Karnan
- Vijay Sethupathi as Sandhanam
- Fahadh Faasil as Agent Amar
- Narain as Inspector Bejoy
- Kalidas Jayaram as ACP Prabhanjan IPS, Vikram's biological son
- Gayathrie Shankar as Gayathri Amar, Amar's wife
- Chemban Vinod Jose as Commissioner Jose
- Santhana Bharathi as Agent Uppiliappan
- Elango Kumaravel as Agent Lawrence
- Vasanthi as Valliammal / Agent Tina
- Hareesh Peradi as Stephen Raj
- Swathishta Krishnan as Prabhanjan's wife
- Gowtham Sundararajan as Veerapandian
- Ramesh Thilak as Elango
- G. Marimuthu as Nagaraj
- Aruldoss as Rudra Prathap
- Maheshwari Chanakyan as Kausalya, Sandhanam's first wife
- Myna Nandhini as Kaikeyi, Sandhanam's second wife
- Shivani Narayanan as Sumitra, Sandhanam's third wife
- Shreekumar as a member of the Black Ops Squad
- Gajaraj as a police officer
- Vinoth Munna as Sandhanam's uncle
- Jaffer Sadiq as Cutting Plier, a gang member working for Sandhanam.
- Gokulnath as Sandhanam's gang member
- Sampath Ram as Sampath, Sandhanam's gang member
- Pondy Ravi as S. Pandidurai
- Nambi as Lab Technician
- Sandeep Raj as Amar's friend
- Arunodhayan as a techie and Amar's friend
- Raghu as Amar's friend
- Anish Padmanabhan as Vikram's aide
- Phathmen as Vikram's aide
- Pradeep as Vikram's aide
- Priyadharshini Rajkumar as an escort
- Maya S. Krishnan as an escort
- Jai Varma as Sandhanam's family member

Special appearances

- Suriya as Rolex, a ruthless kingpin
- Arjun Das as Anbu
- Harish Uthaman as Adaikalam
- Dheena as Kamatchi
- Baby Monica as Amudha
- Village Cooking Channel members as themselves
- Karthi as Dilli (voice-over; uncredited)

== Production ==
=== Development ===
Kamal Haasan's production house Raaj Kamal Films International signed Lokesh Kanagaraj to direct a film for the studio during November 2019. Lokesh had previously mentioned his admiration of Haasan's work, noting the actor's films Sathyaa (1988) and Virumaandi (2004) had influenced him to become a film director. Despite agreeing terms, Lokesh and the studio opted to prioritise other films before beginning production work. Lokesh narrated the script of the proposed film to Rajinikanth in December 2019. The project, which was tentatively titled Thalaivar 169, was scheduled to be launched in March 2020. Despite the progress of discussions, the COVID-19 pandemic delayed the film's launch.

In September 2020, Lokesh announced a different project that would feature Haasan in the lead role. The film's official poster was released on 16 September 2020, which had the working titles Kamal Haasan 232 and Evanendru Ninaithaai, a line from the title song from Haasan's Vishwaroopam (2013). In October 2020, the team made a promotional teaser of the film in Chennai, adhering to the Indian government's COVID-19 safety regulations. Coinciding with the actor's 66th birthday on 7 November 2020, the makers released a title teaser of the film, featuring Kamal Haasan, in which the film's title was revealed to be Vikram, the same title as a 1986 film that also stars Haasan.

On 7 April, after Haasan's commitments during the 2021 Tamil Nadu Legislative Assembly election, Lokesh shared a post through his social media accounts announcing pre-production work for the film had begun. Because Haasan had decided to shoot for the film only after the election results, in which he contested the Coimbatore South constituency, he demanded Lokesh alter the script; but the pandemic delayed this. Initially, the project was planned with a single 60-day filming schedule with a new, undisclosed technology that would shorten film production but this did not happen as planned. Haasan was reported to be playing a retired police officer and media reports stated he would wear a khaki uniform for this film after 15 years since Vettaiyaadu Vilaiyaadu (2006). He was reported to sport a thick beard in the film. For the flashback portions, Lokesh would use de-aging technology. In April 2022, Lokesh submitted the film's script to the Copyright Office, New Delhi, for legal copyrights. Ahead of the film's release that June, he revealed that it was set in the same universe as his own directorial Kaithi (2019), known as the Lokesh Cinematic Universe (LCU).

=== Casting ===
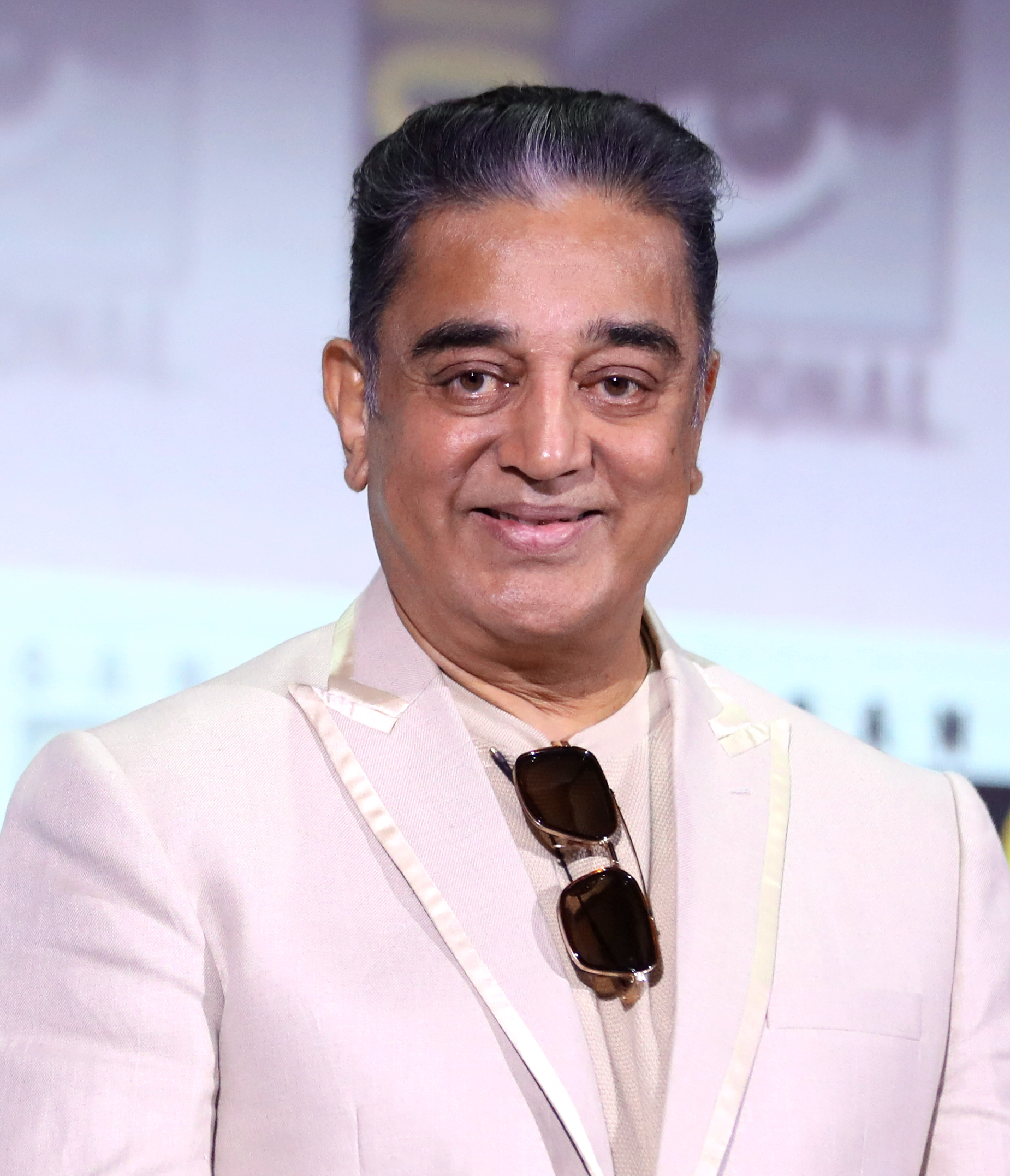
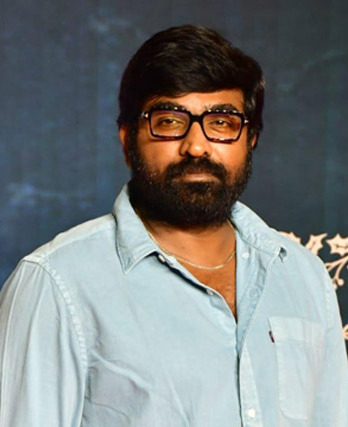
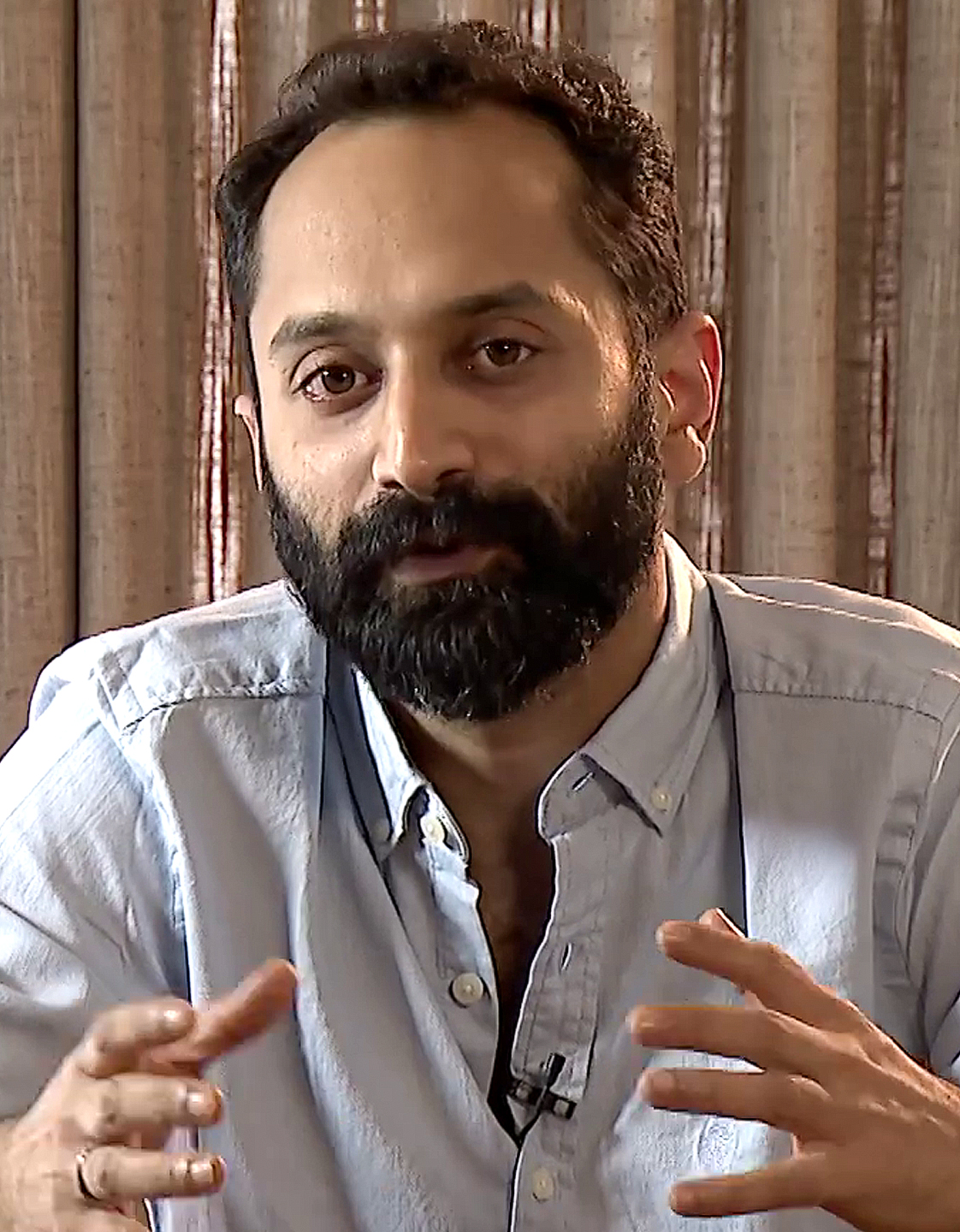
The lead actors: Kamal Haasan, Vijay Sethupathi and Fahadh Faasil

Lokesh chose to work with his norm technicians, cinematographer Sathyan Sooryan and editor Philomin Raj, with whom he worked on Kaithi (2019) and Master (2021). Due to scheduling conflicts, Sooryan left the production and was replaced by Girish Gangadharan, who had made his debut in Tamil cinema with Sarkar (2018). Twin stunt choreographers Anbariv were announced as part of the film's technical crew, marking their second collaboration with Lokesh after Kaithi.

In April 2021, Fahadh Faasil confirmed his presence, making it his third project in Tamil after Velaikkaran (2017) and Super Deluxe (2019). Raghava Lawrence stated he was the original choice for the antagonist, which he declined because he felt the character's violent nature would alienate family audiences so the role went to Vijay Sethupathi. Lokesh noted that he felt one character in Vikram was similar to Narain's character in Kaithi, and that is when he decided to reintroduce the character and other Kaithi characters, thus establishing the cinematic universe. When Narain called Lokesh to congratulate him after the release of the first teaser, the director asked him to join the film. Kalidas Jayaram instantly accepted to act in the film, citing his desire to work under Lokesh's direction after being unable to in Master. Arjun Das, in his third-consecutive association with Lokesh after Kaithi and Master, has a cameo appearance, reprising his role from Kaithi.

In August 2021, Shivani Narayanan was chosen to play one of the three female leads opposite Sethupathi's character. In September, Mynaa Nandhini and Maheshwari Chanakyan were confirmed as the other two female actors. Swathishta Krishnan and Malayalam actor Chemban Vinod Jose were cast in pivotal roles, the latter in his Tamil film debut. In October, popular Tamil-language YouTube channel Village Cooking Channel team—M. Periyathambi, the grandson V. Subramanian, and his cousins—were cast in the film during the third schedule for a wedding sequence. Hareesh Peradi, who appeared in Kaithi, also reprises his role in Vikram.

Suriya confirmed his appearance in a cameo role in May 2022. Haasan talked about Suriya's role at the Film Companion at Cannes Film Festival, stating: "It's no more a rumour. We had to put up our hand and admit that Suriya is playing an incredible last minute appearance. That should take the story a little further, probably into part 3." Suriya charged no fee for acting in the film, and only received a Rolex watch for playing a character named Rolex. Karthi was offered to reprise his role from Kaithi but was then filming the two-part production Ponniyin Selvan (2022 and 2023) and could not change looks; he only had a vocal cameo in Vikram.

=== Filming ===
Principal photography began on 16 July 2021. The team began the film's first schedule in Karaikudi on 6 August, which was delayed by the filming of Suriya's Etharkkum Thunindhavan at the same location and, to comply with COVID-19 safety regulations, the crew had to wait until the Etharkkum Thunindhavan crew had finished filming and left the location. The first schedule began in Karaikudi on 20 August and filming continued for a month. The second schedule of the film began in Chennai on 19 September and later moved to Pondicherry. The second schedule ended on 2 October 2021.

On 13 October, the third schedule began. The team planned to film two sequences for four days at Tamil Nadu Police Museum, including two days of set work on 24–25 October, and two days of filming on 27–28 October 2021 but officials denied permission to film there, citing pandemic restrictions. The filmmakers later decided to postpone the shoot because they needed an alternative location.

The team began the final month-long schedule on 17 November 2021 in Coimbatore, filming scenes featuring Haasan, Sethupathi and Fahadh. Filming was halted after Haasan was diagnosed with COVID-19 after visiting the United States for the inauguration of his clothing brand. This resulted in the team filming major stunt sequences indoors. A set work with more than 50 damaged cars had been filmed in Coimbatore during this schedule; following the actor's diagnosis, the team decided to shift location to Binny Mills for continuity. Filming resumed on 10 December 2021 with important sequences with other actors. Haasan joined the sets on 22 December.

In late December 2021, the production quickly filmed sequences at a house in East Coast Road but in early January, filming stopped after some technicians working on the film were diagnosed with COVID-19. The production cost increased because the cost of renting the house, even on non-filming days, was enormous. Haasan's medical commitments and his participation in Bigg Boss Ultimate further delayed filming, which resulted in the team skipping an entire schedule. Due to the rise in COVID-19 infections in Tamil Nadu, the team planned film with a minimal crew. On 24 January 2022, the team filmed sequences at the Vettri Theatres in Chromepet, Chennai. The final schedule began on 5 February 2022 with 15 days' filming of face-off scenes with Haasan and Sethupathi. To prioritise the filming, Haasan stepped down as the host for Bigg Boss Ultimate. Principal photography wrapped at the end of February.

== Music ==
The music and background score is composed by Anirudh Ravichander, in his first collaboration with Haasan; and second with Lokesh after Master (2021). Sony Music India purchased the music rights. The film's audio launch took place at Jawaharlal Nehru Stadium, Chennai, on 15 May 2022.

== Marketing ==
A 45-second teaser trailer depicting an action sequence set in a prison was released on 7 November 2021. In April 2022, the teaser was attached to prints of KGF: Chapter 2 and Beast in theatres. As part of Vikram's promotion, in collaboration with Southern Railways, the production's marketing team placed advertisements on locomotives travelling across India. The film's trailer was released at the audio launch event on 15 May 2022 and within 24 hours, it exceeded 12 million views.

Raajkamal Films International collaborated with Vistas Media Capital's Fantico and Lotus Metaentertainment for the film's launch in the metaverse platform Vistaverse. Vistaverse announced the launch of utilities through non-fungible tokens (NFT) at the 2022 Cannes Film Festival on 18 May 2022.

Raajkamal led the film's marketing campaign; pre-release events were held in Mumbai, New Delhi, Kochi, Bangalore, Hyderabad, Dubai and Malaysia. Haasan promoted the film on The Kapil Sharma Show, Super Singer 8, the fourth season of Bigg Boss Malayalam, and in his YouTube debut on Village Cooking Channel, which appears in one of the film's scenes.

At a pre-release event held at PVR Priya-Vasant Vihar theatre in Delhi, PVR Cinemas in collaboration with Raajkamal Films announced all theatres in Delhi owned by PVR would be rebranded as "PVR Vikram Hitlist". The film's Kerala distributor Shibu Thameens hosted a pre-release event at Lulu International Shopping Mall, Kochi, on 27 May 2022. On 28 May, an event was held in Mumbai to promote the film's Hindi version. On 29 May, the film's press screening was held in Malaysia with opposition leader Anwar Ibrahim as the chief guest. On 31 May, a pre-release event with Venkatesh and Nithiin in attendance was held in Hyderabad. On 1 June, Haasan attended the film's pre-release event in Dubai and the theatrical trailer was screened at Burj Khalifa.

The packaged water company Bisleri unveiled a limited-edition bottle featuring the cast of Vikram. The film's official Twitter emoji was released on 23 May 2022. On 27 May 2022, a special promotion teasing the conference-call sequence from Haasan's fim Panchatanthiram (2002) was released; it featured lead actors from the original film Jayaram, Yugi Sethu, Ramesh Aravind and Sriman.

Post-release, Vikram was promoted at Times Square, New York City. Amul released a doodle inspired by the film to celebrate its success.

== Release ==
=== Theatrical ===
Vikram was released in theatres on 3 June 2022. It was initially scheduled for release in mid-April but was preponed to 31 March, postponed to 29 April, and then to June 2022, both times after the producers adjusted the release date due to the scheduling of several other big-budget films and production delays caused by the pandemic. Vikram was dubbed in Telugu, Kannada, Hindi and Malayalam under the title Vikram Hitlist.

==== Screenings and statistics ====
According to Tiruppur Subramanian, president of Tamil Nadu Theatre Owners Association (TNTOA), Vikram received the "widest ever release for a Kamal Haasan film". Vikram opened in 700–800 screens in Tamil Nadu, 100 screens in Kerala and 200 screens in Karnataka. The Hindi-dubbed version was released in over 1,000–1,500 screens in North India, competing with Samrat Prithviraj and Major. Prime Media, which acquired the theatrical rights in the United States, hosted special shows in the country on 2 June, ahead of its Indian release. The film was screened in on over 2,000 screens in 500 theatres. Rakesh Gowthaman, managing director of Vettri Theatres, stated anticipation form Vikram was attributed to rigorous promotions from the team. Film distributor and exhibitor Akshaye Rathi talked about the possibilities of the film's performance in the Northern belt, stating: "Vikram has an urban look and feel but the storytelling syntax seems very mass friendly. Kamal's recent movies were abstract and intellectually inaccessible for many. Vikram is a simple, hard-hitting, commercial cinema. It is as mainstream as it gets."

The film earned over ₹103.5 million from pre-ticket sales, according to Asianet News. Early morning shows were held at 4:00 a.m. across Tamil Nadu. In May 2022, a petition was filed to stop screening of 4:00 a.m. shows of the film; the petition said theatre owners may charge high prices for the tickets and alleged tax evasion on these shows that would cause a huge loss for the government, though the issue was later resolved. Horizon Studios, which distributed the film in Karnataka, allotted early morning shows beginning at 6:30 a.m. Tony Raj, the film's distributor, said he estimated the film would receive over 1,200 shows a day in the state.

A week ahead of its release, Madras High Court restrained Internet service providers (ISPs) and over 1,000 unauthorised piracy sites from illegally streaming and downloading of Vikram after one of the production company's executives filed an affidavit ordering the websites not to screen the film.

=== Distribution ===
According to Sify, Vikram was "hot in the trade". Before its release, Vikram earned about ₹2 billion from theatrical and non-theatrical revenues, including sales of its satellite, digital, audio and Hindi-dubbing rights. In late-March 2022, Udhayanidhi Stalin's firm Red Giant Movies acquired the film's theatrical distribution rights in Tamil Nadu. Jayantilal Gada's company Pen Studios acquired the theatrical rights for the Hindi-dubbed version, which it distributed through its division Pen Marudhar Entertainment.

Shibu Thameens' firm HR Pictures acquired Vikram's distribution right for Kerala for ₹80 million. Shree Karpaga Vinayaga Film Circuits acquired the film's Karnataka distribution rights, Sreshth Movies acquired the Andhra Pradesh and Telangana distribution rights.

=== Home media and screenplay ===
In late February 2022, the film's satellite and digital distribution rights were sold to Star India Network for ₹1.12 billion. Vikram began streaming on Disney+ Hotstar from 8 July 2022 in Tamil and dubbed versions in Telugu, Hindi, Malayalam and Kannada languages; and on 13 September 2022, streaming in all five languages started on ZEE5. The Telugu-language version Vikram premiered on television on 11 September 2022 on Star Maa. The Hindi-language version premiered on 24 September 2022 on Star Gold. The original Tamil-language version premiered on 24 October 2022 on Star Vijay, coinciding with the Diwali festival. The Malayalam-dubbed version of the film had its television premiere on 6 November 2022 on Asianet. In January 2023, Pesamozhi Publications published the film's screenplay as a book.

=== Film festival ===
The film made it to the "Open Cinema" section of the 27th Busan International Film Festival and was screened at an outdoor theatre on 7 October 2022.

== Reception ==
=== Box office ===
On the first day of its release, Vikram earned ₹66 crore worldwide, including ₹25 crore in Tamil Nadu, ₹5.02 crore in Kerala, ₹3.4 crore in Karnataka, ₹2.9 crore in Andhra Pradesh and Telangana, and ₹0.75 crore in other territories of India. Within two days of its release, the film had earned ₹100 crore. It had collected ₹175 crore worldwide at the end of its third day, including ₹100 crore in India.

At the end of seven days, Vikram had grossed over ₹260 crore, and close to ₹350 crore at the end of 14 days. According to India Today, on the 27th day of its release, the film's worldwide box-office revenue was approaching ₹500 crore. Vikram broke several records, becoming the first Tamil film to garner ₹100 crore share in Tamil Nadu with a gross collection in the state of nearly ₹200 crore.

Deccan Chronicle reported the worldwide collection to be ₹424 crore (US$53 million). Bollywood Hungama estimated the film had earned a gross of ₹435 crore (US$54 million), The Telegraph India estimated its revenue at ₹450 crore (US$56 million), and Asianet News Tamil estimated earnings of ₹500 crore (US$62 million). According to Hindustan Times, at the end of its 113-day theatrical run, Vikram became the highest-grossing film ever in Tamil Nadu, registered a record attendance and grossed over ₹500 crore worldwide.

=== Critical reception ===
Critics gave Vikram generally positive reviews. On the review aggregator website Rotten Tomatoes, 59% of 17 critics' reviews are positive, with an average rating of 5.6/10.

Divya Nair of Rediff rated the film four stars out of five, and wrote: "With ample whistle podu moments, Vikram is a macho blockbuster that shouldn't be missed". Soundarya Athimuthu of The Quint rated the film four stars out of five, and wrote; "Lokesh Kanagaraj has loaded Vikram with a battalion of characters but he has ensured that all of them have their due scope to perform, even though some might have lesser screen time including Ulaganaayagan". A critic for Pinkvilla rated the film three-and-a-half stars out of five, and wrote: "Kamal Haasan is a visual delight in this action thriller". Ashameera Aiyappan of Firstpost also rated the film three-and-a-half stars out of five, and wrote: "One glimpse of Kamal Haasan in Lokesh Kanagaraj's Vikram and you just know he is the G.O.A.T". Sowmya Rajendran of The News Minute rated the film three-and-a-half stars out of five, and wrote: "Lokesh must be applauded for not wasting time on fanboy tributes to the superstar on board, and sticking to telling the story".

Manoj Kumar R of The Indian Express rated the film three-and-a-half stars out of five and wrote: "Vikram is only the beginning. In the climax, Lokesh teases at least three separate movies that could branch out from this one". A critic for Zee News rated the film three-and-a-half stars out of five, and wrote: "Vikram works if one looks at it as just an action entertainer". Vivek M V of Deccan Herald rated the film three-and-a-half stars out of five, and wrote: "Lokesh has found his own voice and his fast yet admirable growth promises exciting things going forward". Josh Hurtado of The Austin Chronicle rated the film three-and-a-half stars out of five, and wrote: "An incredible booming background score from Anirudh Ravichander, and some very fun surprises throughout, Vikram is definitely among the year's best Tamil films". Haricharan Pudipeddi of Hindustan Times stated: "Anirudh Ravichander's music, especially the background score, plays a pivotal role in amplifying the overall experience of watching Vikram on the big screen, apart from the terrific action sequences. Suriya's brief but powerful cameo is just the high one needs as you step out of Vikram".

Srivatsan S of The Hindu stated: "The new 'Vikram' disappoints the fans of the 1986 original and could have been a standalone film with Fahadh Faasil carrying on the legacy of the agent like in the James Bond films". Lakshmi Subramanian of The Week rated the film three-and-a-half stars out of five, and wrote: "Vikram is packed with thrilling moments from the very first minute. With technical superiority and terrific casting, the first half is an interesting watch, while the narration and a few long rants tire you in the second half". Saibal Chatterjee of NDTV rated the film three-and-a-half stars out of five, and wrote: "Kamal Haasan is fabulous. Vijay Sethupathi fleshes out an edgy criminal whose frazzled heart and addled mind push him in startling directions." M Suganth of The Times of India rated the film three-and-a-half stars out of five, and wrote: "In a film filled with action heroes, the biggest mass moment comes in a stunt scene involving a female character. Vikram needed a few more such moments to have been truly memorable".

Janani K of India Today rated the film three stars out of five, and wrote: "Vikram has several whistle-worthy moments. But, the plot becomes too generic after a point". Gautaman Bhaskaran of News 18 rated the film two-and-a-half stars out of five, and wrote: "Vikram is drama, drama, drama all the way in which the director has not only bitten more than he can chew but exhibits his diehard admiration for Kamal Haasan". Sudhir Srinivasan of The New Indian Express rated the film three out of five, and wrote: "Much like the morality of both characters, I'll have to say it lies somewhere in between, and much like those two men, the film does tilt towards the good". Ananda Vikatan rated the film 44 out of 100. The Hans India gave it three stars out of five, and wrote: "On the whole, Vikram is all for action lovers and movie buffs as it is the best entertaining movie that hit the screens these days! A perfect concoction of action and mystery turned it out into a blockbuster!" Dinamalar rated the film 3.5 out of 5 stars. On the contrary, Bhavani Krishna Iyer of The Sun wrote, "If the end game and message is to sacrifice some people to save the world from the effects of drugs that would proliferate and destroy millions, the end does not justify the means".

=== Accolades ===
At the Ananda Vikatan Cinema Awards, Haasan won the award for Best Actor and the film won the award for Best Crew.

== Future ==
Owing to the film's success, Kamal Haasan told Pinkvilla there was a possibility of a sequel to Vikram. In Leo (2023), the third instalment of the LCU, Haasan reprised his role as Vikram in a voice-over and Maya S. Krishnan reprised her Vikram role in a cameo.
