= Okkur, Pudukkottai =

Village in India

Okkur
- village
- Interactive map of Okkur
- Coordinates: 10.040136°N 79.016474°E
- Country: India
- State: Tamil Nadu
- District: Pudukkottai

Population (2001)
  - Total: 1,251

Languages
  - Official: Tamil
- Time zone: UTC+5:30 (IST)

Okkur is a village in the Avadaiyarkoil revenue block of Pudukkottai district, Tamil Nadu, India.

== Demographics ==
As per the 2001 census, Okkur had a total population of 1251 with 578 males and 673 females. Out of the total population 809 people were literate.
