= Puthambur =

Village in India

- Village Panchayat
- Location in Tamil Nadu, India
- Coordinates: 10.465774°N 78.845660°E
- Country: India
- State: Tamil Nadu
- District: Pudukkottai

Government
  - Type: Village Panchayat

Population (2001)
  - Total: 3,040

Languages
  - Official: Tamil
- Time zone: UTC+5:30 (IST)
- PIN: 622501
- Telephone code: 04322
- Vehicle registration: TN-55

Puthambur is a Village panchayat which is located in Pudukkottai Taluka of Pudukkottai district, Tamil Nadu, India. The Puthambur village has population of 3032 of which 1580 are males while 1452 are females as per Population Census 2011. Pudukottai Municipal Corporation is 10 km from this village

== Demographics ==
As per the 2001 census, Puthambur had a total population of 3040 with 1517 males and 1523 females. Out of the total population 1931 people were literate.
