= Village Cooking Channel =

Indian Tamil YouTube channel

YouTube information
- Channel: Village Cooking Channel
- Years active: 2018-present
- Genre: Cooking
- Subscribers: 30.1 million
- Views: 9.3 billion
- Last updated: January 6 2026

Village Cooking Channel is an Indian Tamil language YouTube channel known for their videos on traditional village food cooking in open fields. As of Dec 2025, it had 30 million subscribers on YouTube and became the first Tamil YouTube channel to receive the first Diamond Creator Award. Several of their videos have more than 100 million views and 'Watermelon Juice' video is the most popular one with 300 million views as of May 2025.

== Background ==
The channel is being run by family members, consisting of brothers V. Subramanian (the cameraman), V. Ayyanar, V. Murugesan, their cousin T. Muthumanickam, their brother-in-law G. Tamilselvan and are led by their grandfather and former chef M. Periyathambi. Periyathambi is a well-known caterer in the village of Chinna Veeramangalam, Pudukkottai, Tamil Nadu.

The channel employs the use of traditional vessels and cauldrons to cook a variety of dishes, using traditional methods (no modern equipment is used). After filming the video, the team have their share of food and later, it is served at old-age homes and orphanages in their village.

In January 2021, Rahul Gandhi joined their outdoor cooking for mushroom biryani in Karur, which enhanced the channel's popularity even further. On 4 July 2021, the channel donated 1 million rupees to Tamil Nadu Chief Minister Public Relief Fund for fight against COVID-19 pandemic.

== Reception ==
=== Accolades ===
Its unique style has won Black Sheep Digital Award for Best Food Programme in February 2021. They have also won The Behindwoods Gold Best Digital Content Creator award in 2021.

== In other media ==
Owing to their popularity, the members were featured in cameo appearances in Vikram (2022), marking their film debut.
