= Kathiramangalam =

- village
- Country: India
- State: Tamil Nadu
- District: Thanjavur

Population (2001)
  - Total: 676

Languages
  - Official: Tamil
- Time zone: UTC+5:30 (IST)
- Postal code: 612106

Kathiramangalam is a village in the Thiruvidaimarudur revenue block of Thanjavur district, Tamil Nadu, India.

== Demographics ==
As per the 2017 electoral data, Kathiramangalam had a total population of 788 with 400 males and 388 females. Out of the total population 373 people were literate.
