= Ponnamangalam =

Neighbourhood in Madurai district, Tamil Nadu, India

- village
- Country: India
- State: Tamil Nadu
- District: Tirumanagalam Tk

Languages
  - Official: Tamil
- Time zone: UTC+5:30 (IST)
- Postal code: 625706

Ponnamangalam is a village in the Sekkanoorani revenue block of Madurai district, Tamil Nadu, India.
