= Annavasal block =

Annavasal block is a revenue block in Pudukkottai district, Tamil Nadu, India. It has a total of 43 panchayat villages.

== Villages ==
- Ammachathiram
- Ariyur
- Alathur
- Edayapatti
- Erumbali
- Erundirapatti
- Eraposal
- Eswarankoil
- Ennai
- Kattakudi
- Kathavampatty
- Killukudy
- Kothadaramapuram
- Keezhakkurichy
- Kothirapatti
- Kudimiyanmalai
- Sathiyamangalam
- Sithanavasal
- Thachampatti
- Thalinji
- Thirunallur
- Thiruvengaivasal
- Thodaiyur
- Narthamalai
- Panampatti
- Mangudi
- Parambur
- Punginipatti
- Pungudi
- Perumanadu
- Pudur
- Pulvayal
- Manavelampatti
- Mukkanamalaipatty
- Muthukadu
- Melur
- Vayalogam
- Veerapatty
- Vettukadu
- Vellanur
- Vellanjar
- Mathiyanallur
- Vilathupatti
