= Panampatti =

Village in India

- village
- Country: India
- State: Tamil Nadu
- District: Pudukkottai

Population (2001)
  - Total: 1,792

Languages
  - Official: Tamil
- Time zone: UTC+5:30 (IST)

Panampatti is a village in the Annavasalrevenue block of Pudukkottai district in the Indian state of Tamil Nadu. Panampatti falls under Illupur taluk.

== Culture ==
The village is known for Pumalandi temple. Every five years a festival is celebrated in the name of Padyal.

=== Shiva Rathri ===
Every year, the Shiv rathiri festival is celebrated. Pilgrims bring milk copper vessels on their heads and walk towards Ayyanar temple.

=== Pusai padayal ===
Pusai padayal means anyone who believes that the god fulfils their aspirations and offers a healthy life.Ddevotees offer padayal to the god, after completion of puja.
