= Meivazhi Salai =

Village in India

- Village
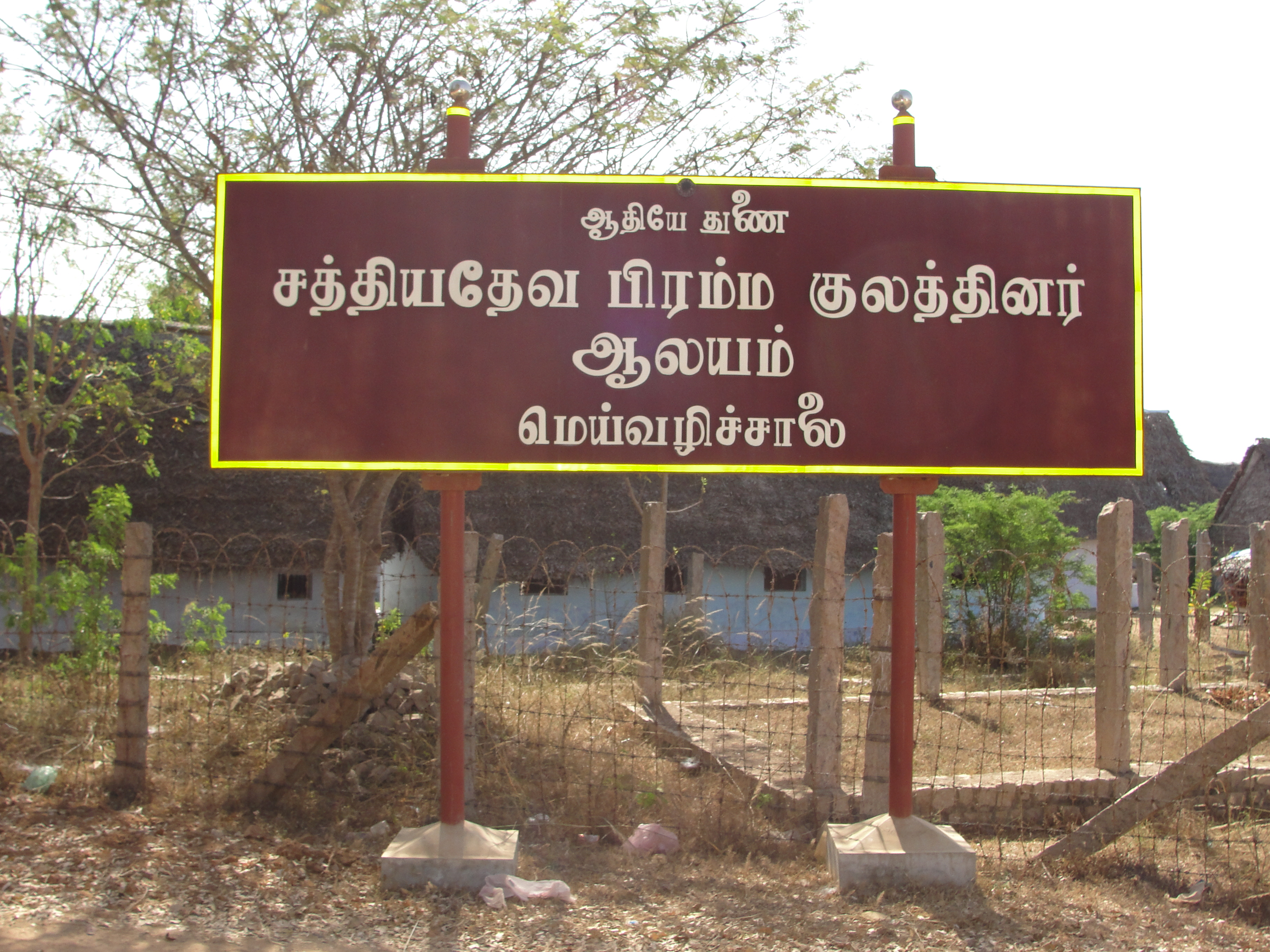

- Location in Tamil Nadu, India Meivazhi Salai (India)
- Coordinates: 10.480691°N 78.733542°E
- Country: India
- State: Tamil Nadu
- District: Pudukkottai
- Founder: Srila Sri Meivazhi Salai Andavargal

Languages
  - Official: Tamil
- Time zone: UTC+5:30 (IST)

Meivazhi Salai is a village in the Illuppur taluk, Pudukkottai district, Tamil Nadu, India. It is a small spiritual community, where the Meivazhi religion arose. It is located about 20 kilometers from the Pudukkottai City and about 38 kilometers from the Tiruchirappalli International Airport.

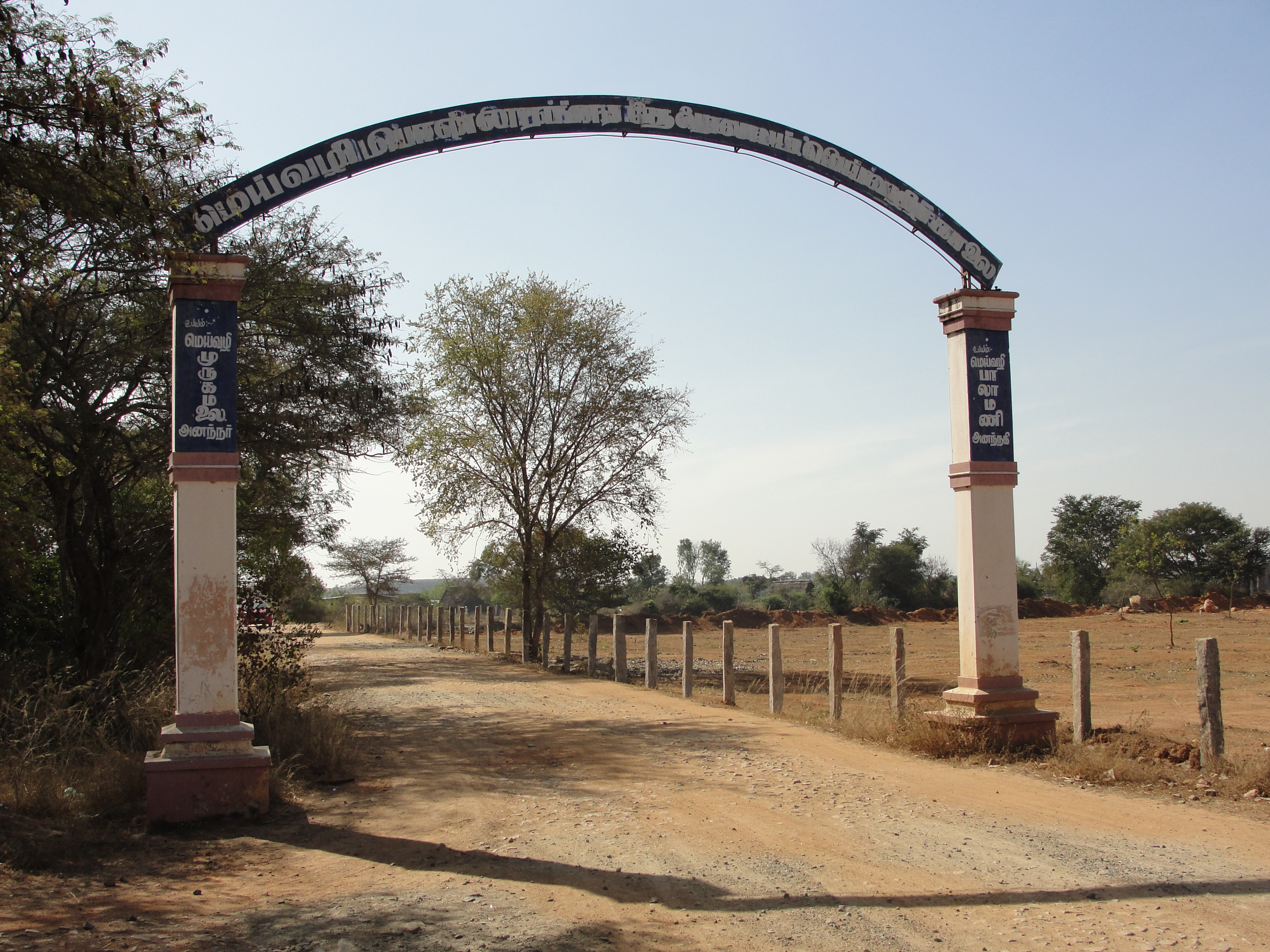
An entrance of Meivazhi Salai - Year 2012

The village is known for its spiritual practices and festivals held every season. The followers of the Meivazhi religion gather at this village during every special occasion, marked in their Meivazhi calendar.

The village community has banned electricity inside the fenced portion. Only thatched huts are allowed to be built so all the occupants are not differentiated in terms of wealth. The rules were framed by the founder of the Meivazhi religion, so that the people will not be distracted by television and other modern amenities. Since most of its occupants are followers of the Meivazhi religion, they have followed all the principles and ethics established by its founder. However, people eventually started relying upon a solar-based power supply for essential purposes such as lighting.

The village also forbids smoking, alcohol, gambling, and theft and practices vegetarianism.

== See also ==
- Sittanavasal Cave
- Kudumiyanmalai
