= Vyagrapurisvarar Temple, Thiruvengaivasal =

Coordinates: 10°25′N 78°46′E

Vyagrapurisvarar Temple is a Hindu temple dedicated to the deity Shiva, located at Thiruvengaivasal of Pudukkottai district in Tamil Nadu, India.

== Location ==
The temple is situated at Annavasal taluk. This place is also known as Thiruvengaipathi.

== Presiding deity ==
The presiding deity is known as Vyagrapurisvarar. The goddess is known as Parvatidevi. The temple tree is vanni. The presiding deity is also known as Thiruvengainathar.

== Structure ==
The Garbhagriha faces west so that during the evening, the rays of the Sun fall on the presiding deity. Near to the deity, Vinayaka is found. There is a separate shrine for goddess. In this temple Subramania, Dakshinamurthy, Surya, Bairava, Mahalakshmi, Perumal and Sanisvara are also found. Dakshinamurthy is found in a different posture, as Ardhanarishvara Dakshinamurthy. In the prakara shrine of Muruga found in octagonal shape. Muruga is found sitting with one leg bent and sitting on one leg. No Vel or peacock is found near to him. No Navagraha is found in this temple. Instead nine Vinayakas are found in a shrine. Shrines are so set up that devotees can see the shrines of Shiva from Theradi Vinayaka, Kala Bairava from Muruga and Mahalakshmi from Perumal.

== History ==
Once Kamadhenu had to face the wrath of Indra, and got a curse. In order to get rid from the curse she asked the advice of Kapila Munivar. He, in turn, advised her to keep her two ears filled with water and to worship Shiva. While she was practising it daily, Shiva in order to test her came in the guise of a tiger and told her that he would kill. Later Shiva, along with his consort gave darshan to her. She got rid out of the curse.

== Festivals ==
Maha Sivaratri, Margazhi Tiruvathirai, Karthikai, and Panguni Uthiram, Vaikasi visakam (10 days) and Thaipusam are held in this temple.
