= Sathiyamangalam, Pudukkottai =

Village in Tamil Nadu, India

Sathiyamangalam
- village
- Country: India
- State: Tamil Nadu
- District: Pudukkottai

Population (2001)
  - Total: 3,355

Languages
  - Official: Tamil
- Time zone: UTC+5:30 (IST)

Sathiyamangalam is a village in the Annavasal revenue block of Pudukkottai district, Tamil Nadu, India.

== Demographics ==
As of 2001 census, Sathiyamangalam had a total population of 3355, with 1678 males and 1677 females. Out of the total population 1903 people were literate.
