= Narthamalai, Pudukkottai =

Village in India

Narthamalai
- village
- Country: India
- State: Tamil Nadu
- District: Pudukkottai

Population (2001)
  - Total: 1,950

Languages
  - Official: Tamil
- Time zone: UTC+5:30 (IST)

Narthamalai is a village in the Annavasalrevenue block of Pudukkottai district, Tamil Nadu, India.

== Demographics ==
As of 2001 census, Narthamalai had a total population of 1950 with 981 males and 969 females. Out of the total population 1188 people were literate.
