= Vilathupatti =

- village
- Interactive map of Vilathupatti
- Coordinates: 10°30′30″N 78°44′56″E
- Country: India
- State: Tamil Nadu
- District: Pudukkottai

Population (2001)
  - Total: 4,472

Languages
  - Official: Tamil
- Time zone: UTC+5:30 (IST)

Vilathupatti is a village in the Annavasalrevenue block of Pudukkottai district, Tamil Nadu, India.

== Demographics ==
As per the 2001 census, Vilathupatti had a total population of 4472 with 2139 males and 2333 females. Out of the total population 2821 people were literate.
