= Ariyur, Pudukkottai =

Village in India

Ariyur
- village
- Interactive map of Ariyur
- Coordinates: 10.428023°N 78.739119°E
- Country: India
- State: Tamil Nadu
- District: Pudukkottai

Population (2011)
  - Total: 1,194

Languages
  - Official: Tamil
- Time zone: UTC+5:30 (IST)

Ariyur is a village in the Annavasal revenue block of Pudukkottai district, Tamil Nadu, India.

== Demographics ==
As per the 2011 census, Ariyur had a total population of 1194 with 645 males and 549 females. The literacy rate was 70.53%
