= Veerapatty =

- village
- Country: India
- State: Tamil Nadu
- District: Pudukkottai

Population (2001)
  - Total: 5,982

Languages
  - Official: Tamil
- Time zone: UTC+5:30 (IST)

Veerapatty is a village in the Annavasalrevenue block of Pudukkottai district, Tamil Nadu, India.

== Demographics ==
As per the 2001 census, Veerapatty had a total population of 5982 with 2851 males and 3131 females. Out of the total population 3799 people were literate.
