= Vayalogam =

- village
- Country: India
- State: Tamil Nadu
- District: Pudukkottai

Population (2001)
  - Total: 2,550

Languages
  - Official: Tamil
- Time zone: UTC+5:30 (IST)

Vayalogam is a village in the Annavasal revenue block of Pudukkottai district, Tamil Nadu, India. Positioned on the Pudukottai-Manapparai SH 74, around 18 km west of Pudukkottai town. Its pin code is 622104. This place is the connecting point for the nearby villages like Agarappatti and Mudhalippatti.

Majority of the people are farmers here. The Government state seed farm is available here. Its name is Annapannai. It was inaugurated during Chief minister C.N. Annadurai's period. There is Tamilnadu Agricultural university, Kudumiyanmalai within 3 km from here. There are many holy places like Arulmigu Muthumariamman Temple, around 800 years old Sivan Temple, Masjid and Adaikala Annai Church and many more. The famous tourist spots in Pudukkottai like Kudumiyanmalai and Sithannavasal are around 5 km to 10 km away from here. Here Panchayat Union Primary School and Government higher secondary school are available. The GHSS was established on 1966. Here there is a small hospital run by a private organization. The Indian Overseas Bank, post office and TNEB Substation are available here. There are ponds for agriculture and drinking water purposes.

== Demographics ==
As per the 2001 census, Vayalogam had a total population of 2550 with 1278 males and 1272 females. Out of the total population, 1570 people were literate.
