= Perumanadu =

Village in India

Coordinates: 10°23′N 78°45′E

- village
- Interactive map of Perumanadu
- Country: India
- State: Tamil Nadu
- District: Pudukkottai
- Named for: God Vishnu

Government
  - Type: govt
  - Body: Village panchayat (ஊராட்சி)
  - Panchayat President: V Mani Asari

Population
  - Total: 2,700+
- Time zone: UTC+5:30 (IST)
- Postal code: 622104
- Vehicle registration: TN 55

Perumanadu is a village in the Annavasalrevenue block of Pudukkottai district, Tamil Nadu, India.

== Demographics ==
As per the 2012 census, Perumanadu had a total population of 2174 with 1400 males and 1300 females. Out of the total population 2700 people were literate.

== A/M Madhyarchchuneshwarar Temple ==
This temple built in 1228–29 CE is the important temple as it located in center of the village. This temple has an important god God Shiva as madyarjuneshwarar and Goddess Parvathi as dharmasmarthini. This temple is constructed by Pandya Dynasty as written in the stones of the temple. Ganesha, Murugan, Dhaschinamoorthy, and few important gods are present in the temple.
