= Melur, Pudukkottai =

Village in India

Melur
- village
- Country: India
- State: Tamil Nadu
- District: Pudukkottai

Population (2001)
  - Total: 2,378

Languages
  - Official: Tamil
- Time zone: UTC+5:30 (IST)

Melur is a village in the Annavasalrevenue block of the Pudukkottai district, Tamil Nadu, India.

== Demographics ==
As of the 2001 census, Melur had a total population of 2378, with 1167 males and 1211 females. Of the total population, 1362 people (56%) were literate.

As of the 2011 census, The Melur village has population of 2992 of which 1466 are males while 1526 are females.

As per constitution of India and Panchyati Raaj Act, Melur village is administrated by Sarpanch (Head of Village) who is the elected representative of village.
