= Ennai =

Village in India

Coordinates: 10°30′N 78°36′E

- village
- Interactive map of Ennai
- Country: India
- State: Tamil Nadu
- District: Pudukkottai

Population (2001)
  - Total: 5,617

Languages
  - Official: Tamil
- Time zone: UTC+5:30 (IST)

Ennai is a village in the Annavasal revenue block of Pudukkottai district, Tamil Nadu, India.

== Demographics ==
As per the 2001 census, Ennai had a total population of 5617 with 2790 males and 2827 females. Out of the total population 2620 people were literate.
