= Kothirapatti =

Village in India

- village
- Country: India
- State: Tamil Nadu
- District: Pudukkottai

Population (2001)
  - Total: 3,348

Languages
  - Official: Tamil
- Time zone: UTC+5:30 (IST)

Kothirapatti is a village in the Annavasalrevenue block of Pudukkottai district, Tamil Nadu, India.

== Demographics ==
As of the 2001 census, Kothirapatti had a total population of 3348 with 1667 males and 1681 females. Out of the total population, 1973 people were literate.
