= Thirunallur, Annavasal, Pudukkottai =

Village in India

Thirunallur
- village
- Country: India
- State: Tamil Nadu
- District: Pudukkottai

Population (2001)
  - Total: 1,969

Languages
  - Official: Tamil
- Time zone: UTC+5:30 (IST)

Thirunallur is a village in the Annavasalrevenue block of Pudukkottai district, Tamil Nadu, India.

== Demographics ==
As of 2001 census, Thirunallur had a total population of 1969 with 972 males and 997 females. Out of the total population 1123 people were literate.
