= Pudur, Pudukkottai =

Village in India

Pudur
- village
- Country: India
- State: Tamil Nadu
- District: Pudukkottai

Population (2001)
  - Total: 2,525

Languages
  - Official: Tamil
- Time zone: UTC+5:30 (IST)

Pudur is a village in the Annavasalrevenue block of Pudukkottai district, Tamil Nadu, India.

== Demographics ==
As of 2001 census, Pudur had a total population of 2525 with 1221 males and 1304 females. Out of the total population 1128 people were literate.
