= Erundirapatti =

Village in India

Erundirapatti irunthirapatti
- village
- Country: India
- State: Tamil Nadu
- District: Pudukkottai

Population (2001)
  - Total: 2,856

Languages
  - Official: Tamil
- Time zone: UTC+5:30 (IST)

Erundirapatti is a village in the illuppur taluk of Pudukkottai district, Tamil Nadu, India.

== Demographics ==
As per the 2001 census, Erundirapatti had a total population of 2856 with 1404 men and 1452 women. The gender ratio was 1.034. The literacy rate was 48.88%
