= Kattakudi =

Village in India

- village
- Country: India
- State: Tamil Nadu
- District: Pudukkottai

Population (2001)
  - Total: 2,250

Languages
  - Official: Tamil
- Time zone: UTC+5:30 (IST)
- Pin code: 622102
- Vehicle registration: TN55

Kattakudi is a village in the Annavasalrevenue block of Pudukkottai district, Tamil Nadu, India.

== Demographics ==
As per the 2001 census, Kattakudi had a total population of 2250 with 1074 males and 1176 females. Out of the total population 1072 people were literate.
