= Alathur, Pudukkottai =

Village in India

Alathur
- village
- Interactive map of Alathur
- Coordinates: 10.497921°N 78.605824°E
- Country: India
- State: Tamil Nadu
- District: Pudukkottai

Population (2001)
  - Total: 1,480

Languages
  - Official: Tamil
- Time zone: UTC+5:30 (IST)
- Postal code: 622102

Alathur is a village in the Annavasal revenue block of Pudukkottai district, Tamil Nadu, India.

== Demographics ==
As of 2001 census, Alathur had a total population of 1480 with 727 males and 753 females. The sex ratio was 1036. The literacy rate was 57.22%.
