= Kudumiyanmalai =

Village in India

- village
- Interactive map of Kudumiyanmalai
- Coordinates: 10°25′1.3″N 78°39′10.26″E
- Country: India
- State: Tamil Nadu
- District: Pudukkottai

Population (2001)
  - Total: 531

Languages
  - Official: Tamil
- Time zone: UTC+5:30 (IST)

Kudumiyanmalai is a village in the Annavasal revenue block of Pudukkottai district, Tamil Nadu, India.

== Demographics ==
As per the 2001 census, Kudumiyanmalai had a total population of 531 with 265 males and 266 females. Out of the total population, 320 people were literate.

== Climate ==
Climate data for Kudumiyanmalai (1981–2007)
| Month | Jan | Feb | Mar | Apr | May | Jun | Jul | Aug | Sep | Oct | Nov | Dec | Year |
|---|---|---|---|---|---|---|---|---|---|---|---|---|---|
| Record high °C (°F) | 37.4 (99.3) | 38.6 (101.5) | 41.9 (107.4) | 42.7 (108.9) | 43.1 (109.6) | 41.8 (107.2) | 39.9 (103.8) | 40.6 (105.1) | 40.0 (104.0) | 39.0 (102.2) | 36.2 (97.2) | 39.2 (102.6) | 43.1 (109.6) |
| Mean daily maximum °C (°F) | 30.5 (86.9) | 33.2 (91.8) | 36.4 (97.5) | 37.8 (100.0) | 38.7 (101.7) | 37.1 (98.8) | 36.1 (97.0) | 36.0 (96.8) | 35.4 (95.7) | 33.3 (91.9) | 30.7 (87.3) | 29.8 (85.6) | 34.6 (94.3) |
| Mean daily minimum °C (°F) | 19.9 (67.8) | 20.8 (69.4) | 22.8 (73.0) | 25.4 (77.7) | 26.2 (79.2) | 25.8 (78.4) | 25.4 (77.7) | 25.2 (77.4) | 24.5 (76.1) | 23.7 (74.7) | 22.5 (72.5) | 20.5 (68.9) | 23.6 (74.5) |
| Record low °C (°F) | 13.5 (56.3) | 14.6 (58.3) | 16.6 (61.9) | 19.6 (67.3) | 20.3 (68.5) | 22.1 (71.8) | 21.2 (70.2) | 21.1 (70.0) | 20.6 (69.1) | 19.6 (67.3) | 16.6 (61.9) | 15.7 (60.3) | 13.5 (56.3) |
| Average rainfall mm (inches) | 22.3 (0.88) | 17.2 (0.68) | 14.8 (0.58) | 35.7 (1.41) | 69.0 (2.72) | 61.6 (2.43) | 91.6 (3.61) | 125.0 (4.92) | 127.7 (5.03) | 170.3 (6.70) | 177.9 (7.00) | 96.2 (3.79) | 1,009.4 (39.74) |
| Average rainy days | 1.3 | 0.9 | 0.9 | 2.2 | 3.6 | 4.1 | 4.5 | 6.3 | 7.3 | 9.7 | 9.0 | 4.4 | 54.1 |
| Average relative humidity (%) (at 17:30 IST) | 54 | 45 | 38 | 41 | 41 | 43 | 44 | 45 | 49 | 59 | 67 | 64 | 49 |
Source: India Meteorological Department

== See also ==
- Sittanavasal Cave
- Meivazhi Salai
