= Thalinji =

Village in India

- village
- Country: India
- State: Tamil Nadu
- District: Pudukkottai

Population (2001)
  - Total: 822

Languages
  - Official: Tamil
- Time zone: UTC+5:30 (IST)

Thalinji is a village in the Annavasal revenue block of Pudukkottai district, Tamil Nadu, India.

== Demographics ==
As per the 2001 census, Thalinji had a total population of 822 with 392 males and 430 females. Out of the total population, 364 people were literate.
