= Poongudi =

Village in India

- village
- Country: India
- State: Tamil Nadu
- District: Pudukkottai Pudukkottai

Government
  - Panchayat President: arunathevi sivakumar

Population (2001)
  - Total: 1,432

Languages
  - Official: Tamil
- Time zone: UTC+5:30 (IST)

Poongudi is a village in the Annavasal revenue block of Pudukkottai district, Tamil Nadu, India.

== Demographics ==
As per the 2001 census, Poongudi had a total population of 1432 with 726 males and 706 females. Out of the total population 908 people were literate.
