= Thachampatti =

Village in India

Thachampatti Tachchampatti
- village
- Country: India
- State: Tamil Nadu
- District: Pudukkottai

Population (2001)
  - Total: 665

Languages
  - Official: Tamil
- Time zone: UTC+5:30 (IST)

Tachchampatti is a village in the Annavasal revenue block of Pudukkottai district, Tamil Nadu, India.

== Demographics ==
As per the 2001 census, Tachchampatti had a total population of 665 with 344 males and 321 females. Out of the total population, 364 people were literate.
