= Muthukadu =

Village in India

- village
- Country: India
- State: Tamil Nadu
- District: Pudukkottai

Population (2001)
  - Total: 3,040

Languages
  - Official: Tamil
- Time zone: UTC+5:30 (IST)

Muthukadu is a village in the Annavasal revenue block of Pudukkottai district, Tamil Nadu, India.

== Demographics ==
As per the 2001 census, Muthukadu had a total population of 3040 with 1512 males and 1528 females. Out of the total population, 2009 people were literate.
