= Kathavampatty =

Village in India

Kathavampatti
- village
- Country: India
- State: Tamil Nadu
- District: Pudukkottai

Population (2011)
  - Total: 1,038

Languages
  - Official: Tamil
- Time zone: UTC+5:30 (IST)

Kathavampatti is a village in the Annavasal Revenue block of Pudukkottai district, Tamil Nadu, India.

== Demographics ==
As per the 2011 census, Kathavampatti had a total population of 1019 with 491 males and 547 females. Out of the total population 646 people were literate.
