= Pulvayal =

Village in India

Coordinates: 10°23′N 78°43′E

- village
- Interactive map of Pulvayal
- Country: India
- State: Tamil Nadu
- District: Pudukkottai

Population (2001)
  - Total: 2,102

Languages
  - Official: Tamil
- Time zone: UTC+5:30 (IST)

Pulvayal is a village in the Annavasalrevenue block of Pudukkottai district, Tamil Nadu, India.

== Demographics ==
As per the 2001 census, Pulvayal had a total population of 2102 with 1050 males and 1052 females. Out of the total population 1211 people were literate.
