= Eswarankoil =

Village in India

- village
- Country: India
- State: Tamil Nadu
- District: Pudukkottai

Population (2001)
  - Total: 2,014

Languages
  - Official: Tamil
- Time zone: UTC+5:30 (IST)

Eswarankoil is a village in the Annavasal revenue block of Pudukkottai district, Tamil Nadu, India.

== Demographics ==
As per the 2001 census, Eswarankoil had a total population of 2014 with 1019 males and 995 females. The sex ratio was 976. The literacy rate was 40.71%
