= Punginipatti =

Village in India

- village
- Country: India
- State: Tamil Nadu
- District: Pudukkottai

Population (2011)
  - Total: 1,912

Languages
  - Official: Tamil
- Time zone: UTC+5:30 (IST)

Punginipatti is a village in the Annavasal revenue block of Pudukkottai district, Tamil Nadu, India.

== Demographics ==
As per the 2011 census, Punginipatti had a total population of 1912 with 925 males and 987 females. It has an average literacy rate of 64.86%.
