= Ammachathiram =

Village in India

Ammachattiram
- village
- Interactive map of Ammachattiram
- Coordinates: 10.9856144°N 79.4142291°E
- Country: India
- State: Tamil Nadu
- District: Pudukkottai

Population (2011)
  - Total: 2,786

Languages
  - Official: Tamil
- Time zone: UTC+5:30 (IST)

Ammachattiram is a village in the Annavasal revenue block of Pudukkottai district, Tamil Nadu, India.

== Demographics ==
As per the 2011 census, Ammachattiram had a total population of 2786 with 1402 males and 1384 females. The literacy rate was 66.54%
