= Meivazhi =

Syncretic monotheistic religion

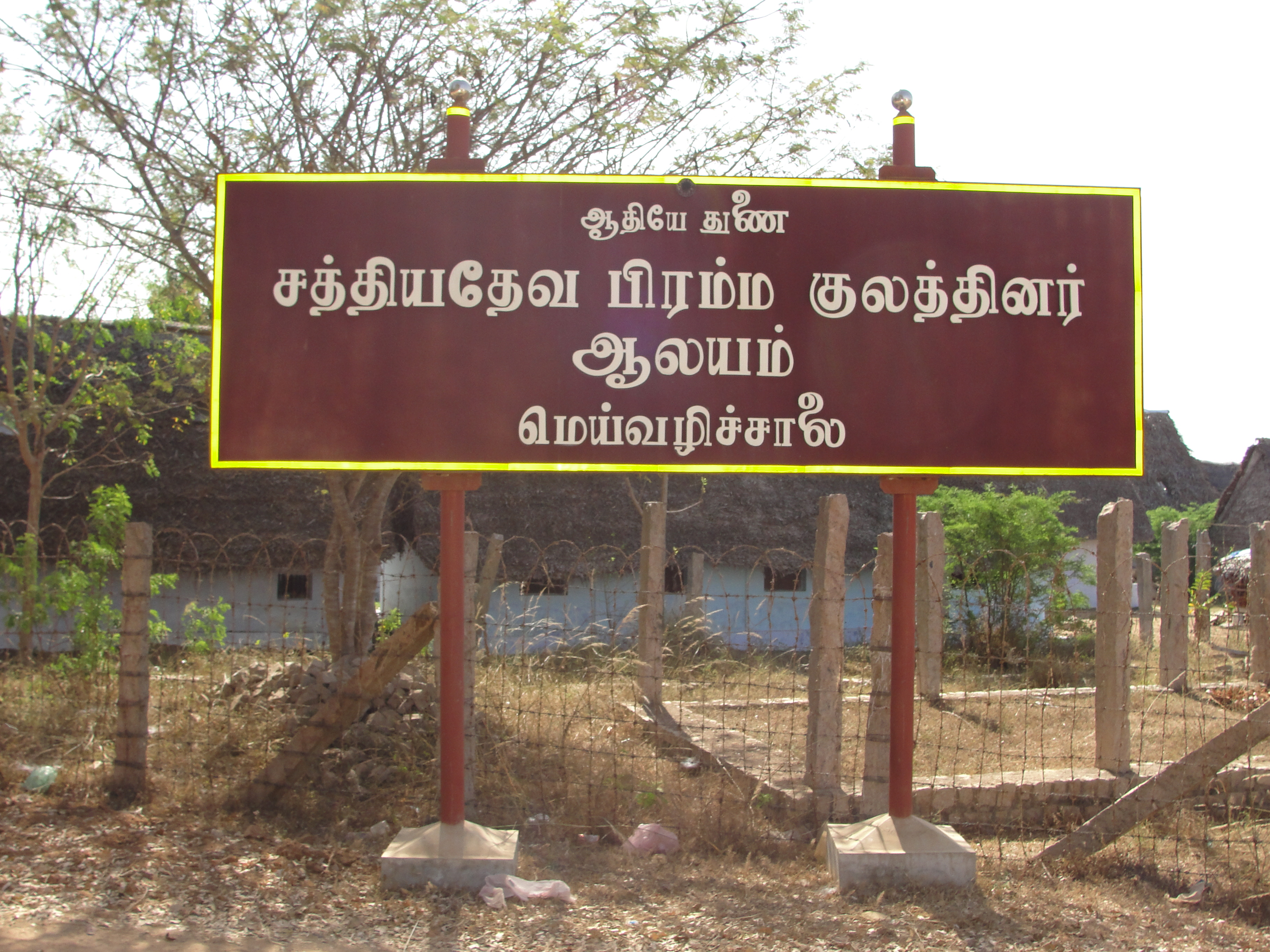
- Type: Indian Religions
- Scripture: Aadhi Mei Udhaya Pooranam; Aadhi Maanmiyam;
- Theology: Monotheistic
- Region: Tamil Nadu, India
- Language: Tamil
- Founder: Meivazhi Salai Aandavargal

Meivazhi (Tamil: மெய்வழி Meyvaḻi), meaning 'the True Path', also known as the "மறலி கை தீண்டா சாலை ஆண்டவர்கள் மெய் மதம்", is a syncretic monotheistic religion based in Tamil Nadu, India. It seeks to spread the true purpose of every religion which originated on Earth and preaches the oneness of all religions such as Saivism, Vaishnavism, Buddhism, Zoroastrianism, Islam, Judaism, Christianity, etc.

Its focus is on spiritual enlightenment and conquest of the cycle of birth and death by attaining heaven, through the teachings and blessings of its founder and leader, Meivazhi Salai Aandavargal (மெய்வழி சாலை ஆண்டவர்கள், meyvaḻi cālai āṇṭavarkaḷ), who is believed to be the Kalki Avatar, the final incarnation of God during the end of Kali Yuga and the beginning of the Kalki Yuga, foretold by several religions.

It draws heavily on Hinduism, although its founder was born into a Muslim family. The Meivazhi allows membership irrespective of caste, creed, color, or religion and the only requirement to be a disciple of the Meivazhi religion is to believe in God.

The Meivazhi has its own set of holy scriptures that run up to four volumes, along with a unique prayer system and festivals. Its official liturgical language is Tamil.

The Meivazhi has only one temple all across the world, which is situated at Meivazhi Salai in Pudukkottai district, Tamil Nadu, named as the Ponnaranga Devalayam (பொன்னரங்க தேவாலயம், Poṉṉaraṅka tēvālayam). The Meivazhi Temple stipulates a dress code for its followers: male followers wear a white panchakacham and a white, pointed turban, while female followers wear a headscarf. The pointed turban (with Kalgi) worn by its followers is believed to signify the beginning of the Kalki Yuga.

The senior disciples of Meivazhi, who had received spiritual revelations (உபதேசம், Upatēcam) directly from Meivazhi Salai Aandavargal, wear saffron clothing and wear a saffron pointed turban with an upward-pointing crescent symbol called 'Kilnaamam' (கிள்நாமம், Kiḷnāmām). The senior disciples prefix the word 'Meivazhi' before their name and suffix the word 'Anandar/Anandagi', while the younger disciples have the word 'Salai' prefixed to their names.

The Meivazhi forbids smoking, alcohol, gambling, theft, and practices vegetarianism.

== Founder ==
Meivazhi Salai Andavargal
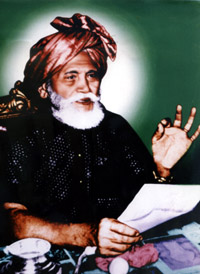
- A Photo of Meivazhi Salai Andavargal.

Personal life
- Born: Khader Badsha Rowther; 1857 Markhampatti, Tamil Nadu, India
- Parents: Jamal Hussain Rowther (father); Periya Thayi (mother)
- Known for: Founder of Meivazhi
- Other name: Marganannadhar

Religious life
- Religion: Meivazhi

=== Biography of Salai Aandavargal ===
The Meivazhi followers address their founder as "Meivazhi Salai Aandavargal (மெய்வழி சாலை ஆண்டவர்கள், meyvaḻi Cālai āṇṭavarkaḷ)".

An earliest documented account of a meeting with Meivazhi Salai Andavargal, in the erstwhile Tiruppattur Meivazhi Ashram, has been narrated in a Book titled 'Glimpses of Chettimarnad' published in 1937 by R.J. Ram & Company, Triplicane High Road, Madras, authored by a Journalist and Explorer named Nilkan A. Perumal, who had mistakenly entered the Pudukkottai State, under the rule of the Thondaman dynasty, while touring the Chettinad region.

Further details on the early life, history, and experiences of Meivazhi Salai Aandavargal are sourced from one of the holy scriptures of Meivazhi, titled "Aadhi Maanmiyam (ஆதி மாண்மியம்)", written by Meivazhi Salai Andavargal himself.

=== Early life ===
According to the scripture Aadhi Maanmiyam, Meivazhi Salai Aandavargal was born in 1857 in the village of Markhampetti, Oddanchatram Taluk, Dindigul district, Tamil Nadu. His birth name was Khader Badsha Rowther. His father, 'Jamal Hussain Rowther', and mother, 'Periya Thayi'. He had his primary education from a teacher, under a banyan tree in his village.

He initially learned to recite the Qur'an, but soon after his teacher's death, came his quest to find the truth about life and the state of the soul after death. He went after prophets and preachers to learn the correct path to salvation. He had asked the orange-robed sanyasins, the black-robed bearded fakirs, and the Gospel-preaching Christian missionaries to show him the correct way to realization. However, he soon realized that people were pretending to be saints for the sake of money. Subsequently, he lost hope in spirituality.

At the age of 18, he was married to Suleka Bivi. With his parents' blessings, he migrated to Kasukkaranpalayam Village, Perundurai taluk, Erode, Tamil Nadu, and established himself as a wholesale paddy merchant. He had a daughter named Aisuamma.

=== Meeting with Guru – Thanigai Mani Piran (Guru Nayagam) ===
At the age of 27, Meivazhi Salai Andavargal was contemplating moving out of India to enrich his rice business. At this time, he coincidentally met an older adult whom Meivazhi Salai Andavargal invited to his Paddy shop, where he was offered Ragi Dosa with Honey. Meivazhi Salai Andavargal proudly conversed with this older adult, who believed that hatha yoga was the only way to attain spiritual enlightenment. But the older adult's response shocked Meivazhi Salai Andavargal, and he sensed that the older man was a divine intervention. Soon, Meivazhi Salai Andavargal became a Disciple of the older adult. The older adult was identified as Shri Thanigai Mani Piran (also known as Mohamed Saligh and Paattayar or Paattaiyah), who was reportedly more than 600 years old.

The Guru of Meivazhi Salai Andavargal, Shri Thanigai Mani Piran, eventually baptized Salai Aandavargal through Brahmopadhesam (ப்ரஹ்மோபாதேசம், Prahmōpātēcam) or the spiritual revelations, at Kasukkaranpalayam, Erode, revealing his true identity and his divine purpose on Earth, elaborating that he had waited more than 600 years to meet Meivazhi Salai Andavargal, and it was their destiny to meet.

The scripture Aadhi Maanmiyam, Chapter 9B, Page 249, contains verses by Ayya Vaikundar that foretell the meeting between Meivazhi Salai Andavargal and his satguru, their bond, their parting, and the subsequent events. It is stated that many saints had already prophesied the meeting between Salai Andavargal and his satguru.

After the spiritual revelation, Meivazhi Salai Aandavargal lost interest in material possessions and renounced his profession, wife, child, and everything in pursuit of the highest spiritual enlightenment, following his satguru across India and many other countries.

The Meivazhi followers celebrate the first meeting of Meivazhi Salai Andavargal and his satguru as a festival during pournami day of the Panguni month (April), as the "(பிறவா நாள் பிறப்பு திருநாள், Piṟavā nāḷ piṟappu tirunāḷ)" festival.

=== Shepherdhood ===
As per the scripture Aadhi Maanmiyam, Meivazhi Salai Andavargal had trained in the art of penance for 12 years alongside his satguru and had finally attained the highest level of spiritual enlightenment. To fulfill his destiny, his satguru decided to gradually part ways with Meivazhi Salai Andavargal, preparing him for his true purpose on Earth. The satguru had ordered Meivazhi Salai Andavargal to tend a flock of sheep at Reddiapatti village in Virudhunagar district for a year. During this time, Shri Thanigai Mani Piran gradually faded from Meivazhi Salai Andavargal's life until he became accustomed to being alone. This separation and the event of tending to Sheep is remembered and celebrated annually by the disciples as the "(ஆடு மேய்ப்பு திருக்கோலக் காட்சி, Āṭu mēyppu tirukkōlak kāṭci)" festival during the month of Vaisakha (Vaikasi in Tamil).

=== Tapas/Penance ===
As per the scripture Aadhi Maanmiyam, after Meivazhi Salai Andavargal had tended to Sheep for a year as per his satguru's command, his satguru directed Meivazhi Salai Andavargal to observe severe penance or tapas in a cave on the western side of Thiruparankundram hill (near Madurai), which he carried out. After 12 years of penance, under the wakefulness and near-starvation diet of Prickly pear, Meivazhi Salai Andavargal is stated to have acquired all the divine symbols (sannadams) – such as Udukai, Trishula, Shankhu, Sudarshana Chakra, Villu, Vaal, Gada (mace), Angusam, Paasam, Modhagam, Vel, and finally the "Kilnamam" (Crescent moon), stated to be visible in his sacred palms. The Crescent moon is considered the ultimate divine symbol and is used by Meivazhi followers as their religion's emblem.

The acquisition of the ultimate divine symbol, the Crescent Moon on his palm, by Meivazhi Salai Aandavargal, is commemorated by the Meivazhi followers by celebrating the festival of "(கோடாயுத சன்னதத் திருக்காப்பு கங்கநத் திருநாள், Kodaayudha Sannathath Thirukkappu Kangganath Thirunall) in the month of Vaikasi (June).

=== The Beginning of Meivazhi ===
When Shri Thanigai Mani Piran realized that his disciple, Meivazhi Salai Andavargal, was fully endowed with wit and power, he christened Andavargal "Maarganadhar". He directed Meivazhi Salai Andavargal to return to the world to undertake the divine mission of redeeming seekers of truth from the bondage of ignorance and illusion. He persuaded him to proceed alone in his holy mission.

Initially, clad in a saffron robe, Meivazhi Salai Andavargal preached to sanyasis and saints, but he soon realized that most of the sanyasis were impostors, not because of ignorance, but because of deliberate attempts to loot innocent people's money to satisfy their lust and hunger. Finally, Andavargal gave up the garb of a sanyasi and took to preaching to family people engaged in worldly occupations.

=== The Rajagambeeram Ashram ===
The First Meivazhi sabha was held in Rajagambeeram village in Sivaganga district, Tamil Nadu, in 1901. However, it is stated that the Hindu priests, Moslem Imams, and Christian Padres heard about his doctrine with dismay and persecuted Salai Andavargal, forcing him to flee Rajagambiram.

The Meivazhi sabha was subsequently started in Tiruppattur, a panchayat town in Sivaganga district, Tamil Nadu. Even at Tiruppattur, it is stated that the persecution had continued for a time but soon ended, as men began to come in large numbers to hear his teachings, and from small beginnings, the number of followers gradually increased year by year. At Tiruppattur, he married Panimathi Nachiyar as per his satguru's wish. Thereafter, Salai Andavargal and Shri Thanigai Mani Piran permanently parted ways.

The Meivazhi Sabha was formally registered as a Society on 19 June 1933.

== Beliefs of Meivazhi ==
=== Origin of Man ===
The contents of the 4 Volumes of Meivazhi religions' Sacred Texts emphasize the prime duty of every man to "Know himself". In the volume "Kodayudha Koor", it has been stated that the tamil language is the oldest language on Earth. In the Tamil Language, the word "மனுஷன்/Maṉuṣaṉ" means Man. If the said Tamil word is split into two, it becomes "மனு/Maṉu (Earthly)" + either "ஈசன்/Īcaṉ" or "நீசன்/Nīcaṉ (Vile or Bad)", which indicates what a Man is truly capable of transforming into. The man was created as a God. The prime purpose of the Meivazhi religion is to make humanity aware of their true astral identity and to reveal the true purpose of every religion that has come upon Earth.

As explained by the Sacred texts of several major religions, the Meivazhi reiterates the authenticity of the story of Adam and Eve and the Fall of man after he consumed a forbidden fruit. The Meivazhi explains that Man is an Astral being created by a Superior God in Heaven in a highly powerful and sophisticated form. However, when man yielded to the Serpent's temptation and consumed the forbidden fruit, man lost all his highly sophisticated powers and was trapped in a lowly, despicable, earthly form. Consequently, man (in his lowly form) and Serpent/Satan were both banished from heaven and imprisoned on Earth for their sins. However, on seeing man's cries, the Superior God pitied man. He reduced his punishment from an eternity to a lifetime of repentance on Earth for his sin of eating the forbidden fruit. He promised to remain in the man's lowly form for a lifetime to help him find a way to attain his true heavenly form.

The Volume "Maanmiyam", explains that to make Earth more livable for Man, the Superior God had gone a step further to create 1008 earthly features such as mountains, waterfalls, seas, along with thousands of animals and birds and many other wonders on Earth, entirely for man, even though man had not dared to ask for any of it since such a debt cannot be repaid by man, even if an equivalent of heaven is given back to the Superior God. Such magnanimity of the Superior God and of the man's debt is stated to be explained in Tirukkuṛaḷ 101, which reads as follows:

செய்யாமல் செய்த உதவிக்கு வையகமும்

வானகமும் ஆற்றல் அரிது

Tamil-English Translation: (The gift of heaven and Earth is not an equivalent for a benefit which is conferred where none had been received.)

=== Purpose of Man on Earth ===
A man's primary duty on Earth is to know himself. The man started his life on Earth with the borrowed lifeforce of the Superior God within his heart. The Volume, Kodayudha Koor, reveals that the heavenly form of man is locked inside himself with 16 divine locks across 16 directions. For a man's soul to regain control of his true Heavenly form, a man has to earn it within his lifetime by acknowledging, praying, and gaining the sympathy of the Superior God within himself. It is stated that a man can attain that heavenly form with the guidance of the Superior God or by any other true divine holy man-True Guru who has attained the heavenly form.

The highest sin of humanity is when a man forgets the existence of the Superior God within himself and fails to regain the Heavenly form before his lifetime on Earth. When a man dies without recognizing the Superior God within himself, the Superior God leaves his earthly form, and the man's soul is reborn in a cycle of birth and rebirth until he realizes the Superior God's presence within himself. Any Acts that waste the life force of the Superior God's borrowed life force, essential for man's self-realization, by self-harm, suicide, homicide, taking away one's own or another Man's opportunity to self-realization, are grave sins. The cycle of birth and rebirth repeats until the final Kali Yuga, when the Earth will be destroyed. When the time for salvation ends, the superior God merely leaves the remaining humanity, leaving them to be eternally enslaved by Satan, turning man into a நீசன்/Nīcaṉ (vile or bad).

=== The Yugas ===
During Adam and Eve's initial days on Earth, known as the Satya Yuga, humanity was well aware of their astral descent, and humanity was very successful in conquering Satan's influence, breaking the cycle of birth and death, and returning to heaven in their Astral Form. However, as the Treta Yuga and the Dvapara Yuga passed, Satan's influence had grown exponentially, leading to widespread ignorance, corruption, chaos, and destruction. Eventually, humanity had completely forgotten penance and was completely corrupted by Satan, provoking them to commit evil deeds and making them forget their origins in pursuit of materialistic pleasures, lust, and greed.

It is stated in the Volume "Kodayuda Koor" that the Kali Yuga had begun when the Mahabharata War started. It was the first war between humanity, where humanity had completely forgotten their Astral origins and fought amongst themselves over lust and petty earthly materialistic possessions due to the corruption caused by Satan. It is stated that after the beginning of Kali Yuga, humanity had completely forgotten the Superior God within themselves, with absolutely no clue of their astral origins. Thus, the entire humanity was trapped in a cycle of birth and rebirth under Satan's deceptions and illusions, with no means to reach their true heavenly form. According to the Meivazhi religion, the biggest sin a man could commit on Earth is "forgetting the presence of the Superior God within Man's lowly earth form", and all the debts humanity owes to the Superior God.

The Meivazhi religion teaches that throughout the Satya Yuga, Treta Yuga, and the Dvapara Yuga, nearly 33 Crore of Mankind had conquered Satan's deceptions and attained their true heavenly form, returning to heaven. Further, throughout the Yugas, nearly 1,24,000 men, known as the Nabis or prophets, had returned to Earth or remained there to assist humanity in breaking the cycle of birth and rebirth and in regaining their true heavenly form. However, it is stated that many of the Nabis who came down to Earth during the Dvapara Yuga were ridiculed by the ignorant humanity. In the initial days of the Kali Yuga, many such Nabis were even tortured by such ungrateful humanity, under the influence of Satan. As such, a majority of humanity had fallen as prey to Satan, with absolutely no clue about their identity or their purpose in life.

The Meivazhi religion teaches that, apart from the 1,24,000 Prophets who came to Earth during different Yugas, to awaken humanity from their ignorance, the Superior God himself had come down to Earth in nine different earthly Avatars, across various regions on Earth, throughout the Yugas under various names, all pointing to the same God. It is revealed that every religion on Earth is merely a shadow of the same Superior God, teaching the same core principles, with the sole intent of making humanity realize its astral origin and its true capabilities.

But despite the efforts of the Superior God and the Prophets, the majority of humanity was already too corrupted by Satan, who had actively worked against the teachings of the Superior God and the Prophets, manipulating humanity to believe in multiple religious beliefs, multiple gods, and even false Gods. Under the influence of Satan, the Prophets were disrespected and cruelly tortured by humanity. Satan had managed to manipulate and fragment humanity into different groups and had actively pitted the followers of one fragment against each other, destroying the very purpose of all those Religions. As such, every such religion lost its true purpose and became a mere mockery. A large portion of humanity was following religions only in name, without knowing their true purpose, nor the fact that the Superior God exists within oneself, nor their astral origins, completely blinded by their lust, greed, and materialistic desires. Thus, the major portion of humanity had no means to attain their true heavenly form.

=== Kalki Yuga ===
It is stated in the Volume "Kodayutha Koor" that the start of the Meivazhi Religion marks the end of the Kali Yuga and the beginning of the Kalki Yuga, which was prophesied in the Kalki Purana and anticipated by the sacred texts of many religions. The Meivazhi religion has successfully united 69 Castes of Hinduism, along with every major religion on Earth, such as Christianity, Islam, etc., into a single community. The Meivazhi preaches the oneness of all religions, with the sole intent of revealing the true purpose of every religion on Earth and making humanity realize their true astral origins and their destiny to reach heaven through the example of its founder.

The founder of Meivazhi had instructed the disciples never to worship statues or photos of him, which are merely temporary identities of the Supreme God. The Meivazhi teaches its followers that both the Superior God and Satan exist within themselves, and it is up to humanity to choose whichever path they desire. The Meivazhi teaches that the Superior God is inside the man's heart during his lifetime and that a Man's affection alone could earn the sympathy of the Superior God. Thus, the Tamil proverb "அன்பே சிவம்/Aṉpē civam" means "Love is God." The Meivazhi further teaches its followers that the Superior God exists within Man only to protect his Soul from Satan, and never to pray for petty materialistic possessions. It explains that praying for materialistic possessions from the Superior God is like asking an Emperor for a broom.

The followers of the Meivazhi religion believe that the founder of the Meivazhi religion is the Kalki avatar, the final incarnation of Lord Vishnu as mentioned in Hinduism and also the Second Coming of god's incarnation on this Earth as mentioned in various other religions., expected to bring an end to the Kali (demon).

=== The End of the World Prophecy ===
The Volume Kodayudha Koor states that the destruction of the Earth will occur before Hijri year 1500, which corresponds to 21-Jul-2077 in the Gregorian Calendar. Further, in the volume Maanmiyam, in chapter 9B – "Sannadham Perum Paruvam", Page 254, a poem written by Ayya Vaikundar, has been extracted, wherein at Stanzas 2 and 3, certain hints have been made in Tamil as follows:

"...வங்காள அரண்மனையார் / Vangala Palace (or Royals)

வாறாரே கலியழிக்கச் / are coming to destroy Kali

செப்ப எளிதல்லவே / It is not very easy

செயிக்கஏலா தாராலும்... / no one can win"

Although the exact meaning of the word "Vangala" is unclear, it may refer to the rise of Bengal or China.

=== Religious attributes of a true Spiritual Guru ===
Meivazhi teaches that the Heavenly tokens which distinguish a true spiritual guru from impostors are:

- he has conquered slumber and sleep.
- he has conquered the necessity to breathe.
- he has practically overcome the need for food.

The followers of Meivazhi believe that Salai Aandavargal had exhibited all the above-stated features.

=== Incorruptibility ===
It is believed that the primordial sign that a man has reached the Superior God is that the person's physical self will become incorruptible when he dies. It is believed that when a man dies without even meeting the Supreme God within himself, he dies without fulfilling his most basic purpose in life, and therefore, the Supreme God merely leaves his earthly form, without helping the soul attain its true heavenly form. Consequently, the earthly form decays, and the soul becomes eternally enslaved by Satan. However, when a Man had realized the Supreme God within himself and prayed affectionately throughout his lifetime, the Supreme God helped him to attain his true heavenly form, locked within himself, at the time of his death, and Satan would fear to get anywhere near a Man's heavenly form. Therefore, the earthly form would never decompose. It is believed that every religion came to Earth only to prove this fact, as seen in many saints whose bodies have not decomposed for hundreds of years. This divine phenomenon is stated to happen among the people of the Meivazhi religion, and there were instances, where even non-followers, who had visited the Meivazhi Salai temple and prayed, had shown signs of divine incorruptibility.

The Followers of Meivazhi believe that a person's attainment of heaven can be ascertained by their body, by observing the following 10 observable divine signs after death, showing Immortal Proofs, empirical evidence of salvation at the time of death:

- No Putrefaction / No bad stench from the physical body – only a pleasant aroma emanates from it—no discharge of foul-smelling liquid / Gas or No postmortem priapism.
- No Rigor Mortis / stiffening of the body. Showing signs of the flexibility of bodily parts.
- No Livor Mortis / The body will be light in weight, like a flower basket.
- The body sweats as time passes.
- No Algor Mortis – The complete body exhibits warmth.
- The natural conditions of the throat prevail. Hence, the body takes in the Holy Water (Kaashaaya Theertham) when given.
- The knuckles give out a sound when cracked, all continuing – as in the living state.
- The disappearance of deformities (e.g., a hunched back), with which they may have been afflicted in life.
- No Pallor Mortis / The pure and pleasant state of the human body reflecting youthfulness and cheeriness blooming on the face.
- No Decomposition / Skeletonization – The human body does not decay after death. Also, Mother Earth does not harm the body but preserves it, just like a Seed ready to sprout.

Meivazhi followers cite the non-decomposing bodies of Ramanuja, Francis Xavier, Bernadette Soubirous, and many Buddhist monks as examples and proof that this phenomenon has occurred since the beginning of humanity and continues to occur. This is known across the World by different names in different faiths, as Divine Incorruptibility, Wafath, Sukoshinbitsu, Asleep in Christ, Adakkam, Jiva Sammadhi, Mukthi, Moksha, Vaikundam, Sivalogam, Eternal Salvation.

== Meivazhi Scriptures ==
Meivazhi has its own Holy scriptures running up to four volumes in the Tamil language.

- Volume I (ஆதி மெய் உதய பூரண வேதாந்தம், Āti mey utaya pūraṇa vētāntam)
- Volume II (ஆண்டவர்கள் மான்மியம், Āṇṭavarkaḷ māṉmiyam)
- Volume III (எமன் படர் அடிபடு திரு மெய்ஞ்ஞானக் கொரல், Emaṉ paṭar aṭipaṭu tiru meyññāṉak koral)
- Volume IV (எமன் படர் அடிபடு கோடாயுதக் கூர், Emaṉ paṭar aṭipaṭu koṭāyūtak kūr)

== Meivazhi sabha ==
The first Meivazhi Ashram was founded in 1926 at Rajagambeeram village in Sivaganga district, Tamil Nadu. On a full moon day, Andavargal hoisted a flag (Pooran Kodi) with 96 bells. Several disciples came and attended the historic event. Andavargal composed a song titled "Gnana Sangu". In one of the Meivazhi Vedas, namely "Aadhi Maanmiyam", at Chapter 2, page 7, it is stated that the Village Rajagambeeram was previously known as Shambhala during the times of Narada. However, due to religious persecution at Rajagambeeram Village, the said ashram was abandoned. Subsequently, the Meivazhi Asharam was started at Tiruppattur, a panchayat town in the present Sivaganga district, Tamil Nadu, where the sabha was initially registered as a Society on 19 June 1933 under the Societies Registration Act, 1860 (Act 21 of 1860, India). From small beginnings, the number of followers gradually increased year by year.

On 14 September 1940, Madurai Ashram was inaugurated, and the sabha was shifted to Madurai (Aruppukottai Road). The new ashram was painstakingly built entirely using granite. But in 1942, during the Second World War, the British Government acquired the entire place in Madurai and paid a compensation of Rs. 1,37,750/- to the Meivazhi sabha. Consequently, the sabha had to be shifted again to a different place, and the Madurai Ashram came to be referred to as the பழஞ்சாலை/Paḻañcālai (meaning old Salai). It is stated that even before the acquisition, some prophetic carvings were inscribed in the lentil stones of the Ashram hall in the year 1940, which reads as "ஆலயம் மாற அரசு மாறும்" ("When the Temple changes, the Government will change"). The said inscription in the erstwhile Meivazhi Ashram (presently the Madurai Aerodrome campus) remains a monument for the Disciples. The Meivazhi sabha was later shifted to Pappanachivayal, Pudukkottai district, Tamil Nadu, near the Ural Hills, in the erstwhile Pudukkottai State, where Salai Aandavargal purchased a jungle land for about Rs. 6,000/- and cleared it for habitation. On 17 November 1942, Andavargal hoisted the first flag and named the place Meivazhi Salai. The sabha was re-registered on 10 June 1944, and it became the Meivazhi Salai village.

The Meivazhi sabha had a President and 24 senior disciples, referred to as the "சத்தியப்பிடி மூப்பர்/Cattiyappiṭi mūppar" (Elders of Truth), who were appointed by Salai Andavargal himself to handle the sabha's everyday affairs. One Meivazhi Kailai Anandhar, a leading criminal lawyer of that time, was the president of the Association until 1974, and thereafter, due to his old age, Salai Andavargal appointed one Meivazhi Murugamalai Anandar as the president. It is stated that during the British-ruled period, the senior disciples suggested to Salai Andavargal that the compensation given by the British and the offerings from the disciples be converted into gold. Thus, several gold ingots engraved with the seal of the British Crown were purchased and stored at various hidden locations across the village under different trees. The location of the ingots was known to only a few disciples, many of whom had died of old age. However, immediately after His Holiness Salai Andavargal attained the greatest Penance State called Vankani Virat Thavam on 19 February 1976, His Holiness is now in the Highest Penance state, but some confusion and chaos prevailed among the followers, as to the future of the temple administration, and also the uncertainty as to whether the phenomenon of incorruptibility will continue or not. In March 1976, the followers faced a credibility crisis when the Indian Government Customs and Excise Department officers, based on some anonymous tip-off from within the village, raided the hermitage in a weeklong operation, unearthing all the stored gold and silver ornaments, including personal belongings of some of the disciples, during the uncertain times of the Emergency period in India. The Government had charged many of the disciples with illegal hoarding of wealth, but eventually lost the case because the recovered ornaments were not the personal belongings of the disciples but belonged to the sabha. After years of uncertainty and fear, the disciples finally came back to the temple when they realized that the phenomenon of incorruptibility was continuing to take place even when Salai Andavargal was in a state of Mahasamādhi. The place where Salai Andavargal attained Mahasamādhi is referred to as the "Ponnaranga Devalayam (பொன்னரங்க தேவாலயம், Poṉṉaraṅka tēvālayam), meaning "The Golden Temple". All the Prayers, Rituals, and Festivals are held around this Shrine.

=== Hindu Temple or Not? ===
Immediately after Salai Aandavargal attained Mahasamādhi on 12 February 1976, during the late 1970s and the 1980s, the Hindu Religious and Charitable Endowments Department (HR & CE), Tamil Nadu, attempted to take control of the Ponnaranga Devalayam Temple, which was heavily contested by the temple before the Hon'ble High Court of Madras in Writ Appeal No. 151 of 1977, wherein the Hon'ble First Bench of the Madras High Court, vide an Order dated 23 September 1985, directed the department to decide under Section 63(a) of the HR&CE Act (Act 22 of 1959, Tamil Nadu) whether the Ponnuranga Devalayam Temple is a Hindu temple or not, before proceeding any further. As such, the temple contested the case before the Deputy Commissioner of the HR&CE Department in O.A. No. 69 of 1985, during which depositions were obtained from several members of the community who originally belonged to various religions, including Hinduism, Christianity, and Islam. Notably, several leading lawyers were followers of this religion. One Meivazhi Kailai Anandhar, a Hindu by birth and a leading criminal lawyer of the time, was the president of the Association until 1974. One Meivazhi Gowshal Anandar, a Muslim by birth and another leading criminal lawyer, who was the chairman of the Wakf Board, and Justice Suryamurty, a retired Judge of the Hon'ble High Court, were all part of this religion. It was noted in the proceedings that the Ponnuranga Devalayam and Meivazhi sabha were not exclusively intended for Hindus alone, but non-Hindus also. It was observed in the proceedings that all the followers of Meivazhi Andavar have been strictly adopting the principles and regulations and mode of living, religious rituals, ceremonies, conducting of marriages, and conducting of obsequies after death, as enumerated in their four sacred books, and that it is quite different from the regulations and the rituals to be followed by the Hindus at the time of religious ceremonies, like marriages, etc. It was further observed that the institution Ponnuranga Devalayam does not have any Thuvajasthambam, praharam, gopuram, or Vimaanam, etc., which are normal features for a Hindu Temple. Ultimately, the proceedings were concluded vide an Order dated 3 April 1986, holding that the Ponnuranga Devalayam and the Meivazhi sabha do not come under the purview of the HR&CE Act (Act 22 of 1959, Tamil Nadu). This was also confirmed by the Hon'ble High Court of Madras in Writ Petition (Madurai) No. 13175 of 2012.

=== Dress code for entering the Ashram ===
Meivazhi followers are required to follow a dress code when entering the ashram. It stipulates white panchakacham and a white pointed turban for its Male followers, while its female followers wear a headscarf or cover their head with their Saree. The Senior followers (known as Anandars), who had obtained spiritual revelations (உபதேசம், Upatēcam) from Salai Aandavargal, wear saffron clothing and wear a saffron pointed turban with an upward-pointing crescent symbol called as 'Kilnaamam' (கிள்நாமம் Kiḷnāmām).

Most of the followers wear the turban throughout the day. Therefore, in 2007, the Government of Tamil Nadu provided a relaxation for followers of Meivazhi, allowing them to wear bike helmets while keeping their turbans on. This is similar to the relaxation given to the wearers of the turban in Sikhs in India.

== Practices and rituals ==
The followers of Meivazhi do not worship idols, tombs, or material objects. They are non-materialistic and believe that God exists within their hearts. They pray, focusing on the God within themselves. The Daily rituals around the temple are a mere reminder that God is within their heart. The Daily prayer rituals or 'Vanakkam (வணக்கம், Vaṇakkam)' take place throughout the day at their temple. The Anandhars, or Disciples, take turns staying in the temple and conducting rituals throughout the day and at night.

- 4:30AM – Recital of Thirupanchanai Yeluchi (Tamil: திருப்பஞ்சணையெழுச்சி).
- 5.30AM – 6.00AM – Recitation of Aadhi Maanmiyam (Tamil: ஆதி மான்மியம்).
- 7.00AM – Recital of Maha Sankalpa Manthiram (Tamil: மகா சங்கல்ப மந்திரம்).
- 11.45AM-12.15PM – Afternoon Prayer or Aravalam (Tamil: அரவலம்).
- 5.30PM – Recital of Adhi Mei Udhayapoora Vedandham (Tamil: ஆதி மெய் உதய பூரண வேதாந்தம்)
- 6.00PM – Evening Prayer.
- 8.30PM – Recital of Theiva Thedu Koodagam (Tamil: தெய்வத்தேடு கூடகம் பாடுதல்).
- 9.00PM – Night Prayer, followed by Recital of Lord Buddha's Sermon of the Seven Suns Prophecy in Tamil.
- 12.00AM – Recital of Lord Buddha's Sermon of the Seven Suns Prophecy in Tamil.
- 1.30AM – Recital of Miscellaneous Prophecies.
- 2.00AM – Recital of Lord Buddha's Sermon of the Seven Suns Prophecy in Tamil.
- 3.00AM – Recital of 'Uthiyovana Siddhi Kaanagam (Tamil: உத்தியோவான சித்தி கானகம்)' Prayer. Recital of Miscellaneous Prophecies.
- 4.00AM – Recital of Lord Buddha's Sermon of the Seven Suns Prophecy in Tamil.
- 4.20AM – Recital of "Meiporul Adaikalappa (Tamil: மெய்ப்பொருள் அடைக்கலப்பா)" and "En Disaiyum (Tamil: எண்டிசையும்)". Morning Prayers continue.

== List of Festivals ==
=== Month of Thai (January–February) ===
- Kolari Saalaiyar Pongal Festival (Tamil: கோளரி சாலையார் பொங்கல் திருநாள் Kōḷari cālaiyār poṅkal tirunāḷ) celebrating the festival of Pongal by preparation of sweet Pongal using holy water by the Disciples around the Ponnaranga Devalayam.
- Selva Pongal (instead of Mattu/Cow Pongal) is celebrated on the subsequent day.

=== Month of Panguni (March–April) ===
- Piravaa naal Pirappu Thirunal (Tamil: பிறவா நாள் பிறப்பு திருநாள் Piṟavā nāḷ piṟappu tirunāḷ), celebrating the day of Spiritual rebirth of Salai Andavargal.
- Flag hoisting of 'Pooran Kodi' (Tamil: பூரான் கொடி Pūrāṉ koṭi), a special flag decorated with 92 bells.

=== Month of Vaikaasi (May–June) ===
- Aadu meippu Thiruvizha (Tamil: ஆடு மேய்ப்பு திருவிழா Āṭu mēyppu tiruviḻā), in remembrance of Salai Andavargal as a Good Shepherd as per the command of his Guru.
- Pasubatha Kangana Thiruvizha (Tamil: பாசுபத கங்கணம் திருவிழா Pācupata kaṅkaṇam tiruviḻā), celebrating Salai Andavargal's acquisition of Sannadam and Spiritual powers through continuous penance.
- Puthadai Punai seer Thiruvizha (Tamil: புத்தாடை புனை சீர் திருவிழா Puttāṭai puṉai cīr tiruviḻā), celebrating the start of a Spiritual life through family life.
- Flag hoisting of 'Pooran Kodi' (Tamil: பூரான் கொடி Pūrāṉ koṭi), a special flag decorated with 92 bells

=== Month of Purattaasi (September–October) ===
- Pichai Andavar Thirukkola Thiruvizha (Tamil: பிச்சை ஆண்டவர் திருக்கோல திருவிழா Piccai āṇṭavar tirukkōla tiruviḻā), celebrating the Bestower of Alms.

=== Month of Karthikai (November–December) ===
- Karthigai Deepam, (Tamil: கார்த்திகை தீபம் Kārttikai tīpam), celebrating the Festival of Lights.

=== Month of Maargazhi (December–January) ===
- Thiru Avathara Thirunal (Tamil: திரு அவதார திருநாள் Tiru avatāra tirunāḷ), during Bhogi), celebrating the birth of Salai Andavargal.

=== Bi-Monthly Events ===
- Flag hoisting of 'Killnaama Kodi' (Tamil: கிள்நாமம் Kiḷnāmam), a White flag bearing the Crescent Moon, is done twice every month, on the full moon day and on the third day of the new moon.

== See also ==
- Meivazhi Salai, Village
- Shambhala
- Ayyavazhi
