= Vellanjar =

Coordinates: 10°30′N 78°40′E

- village
- Interactive map of Vellanjar
- Country: India
- State: Tamil Nadu
- District: Pudukkottai

Population (2001)
  - Total: 1,674

Languages
  - Official: Tamil
- Time zone: UTC+5:30 (IST)

Vellanjar is a village in the Annavasal revenue block of Pudukkottai district, Tamil Nadu, India.

== Demographics ==
As per the 2001 census, Vellanjar had a total population of 1674 with 838 males and 836 females. Out of the total population 926 people were literate.
