= Erumbali =

Village in India

- village
- Country: India
- State: Tamil Nadu
- District: Pudukkottai

Population (2001)
  - Total: 1,222

Languages
  - Official: Tamil
- Time zone: UTC+5:30 (IST)

Erumbali is a village in the Annavasal revenue block of Pudukkottai district, Tamil Nadu, India.

== Demographics ==
As per the 2001 census, Erumbali had a total population of 1222 with 630 males and 592 females. The sex ratio was 1015. The literacy rate was 57.20%
