= Mangudi, Annavasal, Pudukkottai =

Village in India

Mangudi
- village
- Country: India
- State: Tamil Nadu
- District: Pudukkottai

Languages
  - Official: Tamil
- Time zone: UTC+5:30 (IST)

Mangudi is a Village in the Annavasalrevenue block of Pudukkottai district, Tamil Nadu, India.
