= Kothadaramapuram =

Village in India

Kothadaramapuram Kothandaramapuram
- village
- Country: India
- State: Tamil Nadu
- District: Pudukkottai

Population (2001)
  - Total: 1,429

Languages
  - Official: Tamil
- Time zone: UTC+5:30 (IST)

Kothandaramapuram is a village in the Annavasalrevenue block of Pudukkottai district, Tamil Nadu, India.

== Demographics ==
As per the 2001 census, Kothandaramapuram had a total population of 1429 with 716 males and 713 females. Out of the total population 708 people were literate.
