= Thudaiyur =

Village in Tamil Nadu, India

- village
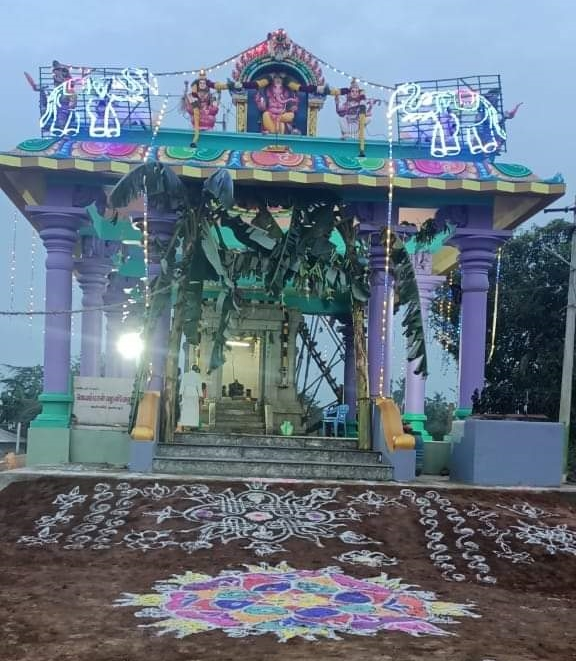
- Lord Sakthi vinayagar
- Country: India
- State: Tamil Nadu
- District: Pudukkottai

Languages
  - Official: Tamil
- Time zone: UTC+5:30 (IST)

Thudaiyur is a village in the Annavasal revenue block of Pudukkottai district, Tamil Nadu, India.
