= Sithanavasal =

- village
- Country: India
- State: Tamil Nadu
- District: Pudukkottai

Population (2001)
  - Total: 1,629

Languages
  - Official: Tamil
- Time zone: UTC+5:30 (IST)

Sithanavasal is a village in the Annavasal revenue block of Pudukkottai district, Tamil Nadu, India.

== Demographics ==
As of the 2001 census, Sithanavasal had a total population of 1629 with 805 males and 824 females. Out of the total population, 650 people were literate.

== Chithannavasal cave ==
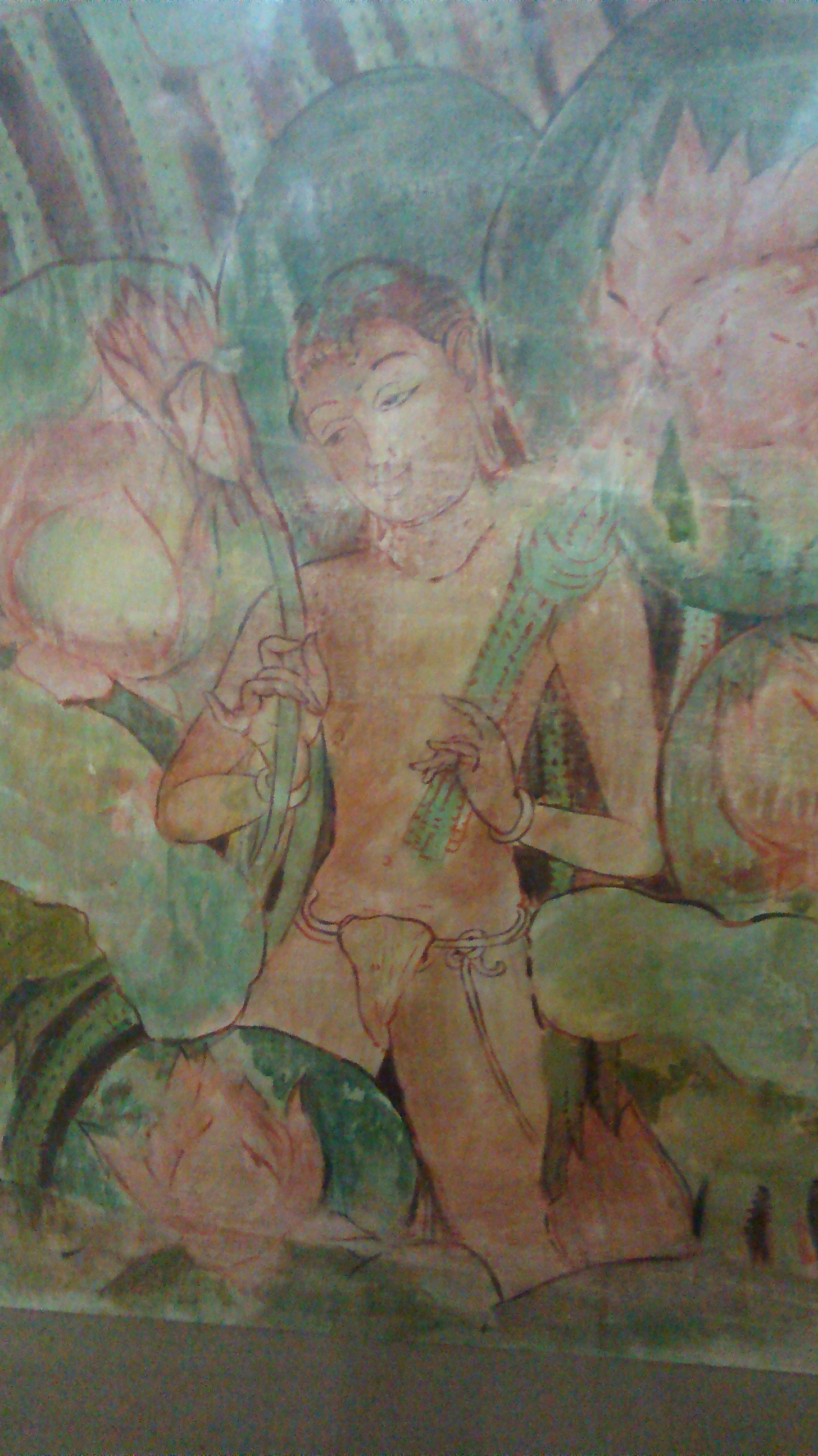
Sithanavaasal Paintings Man

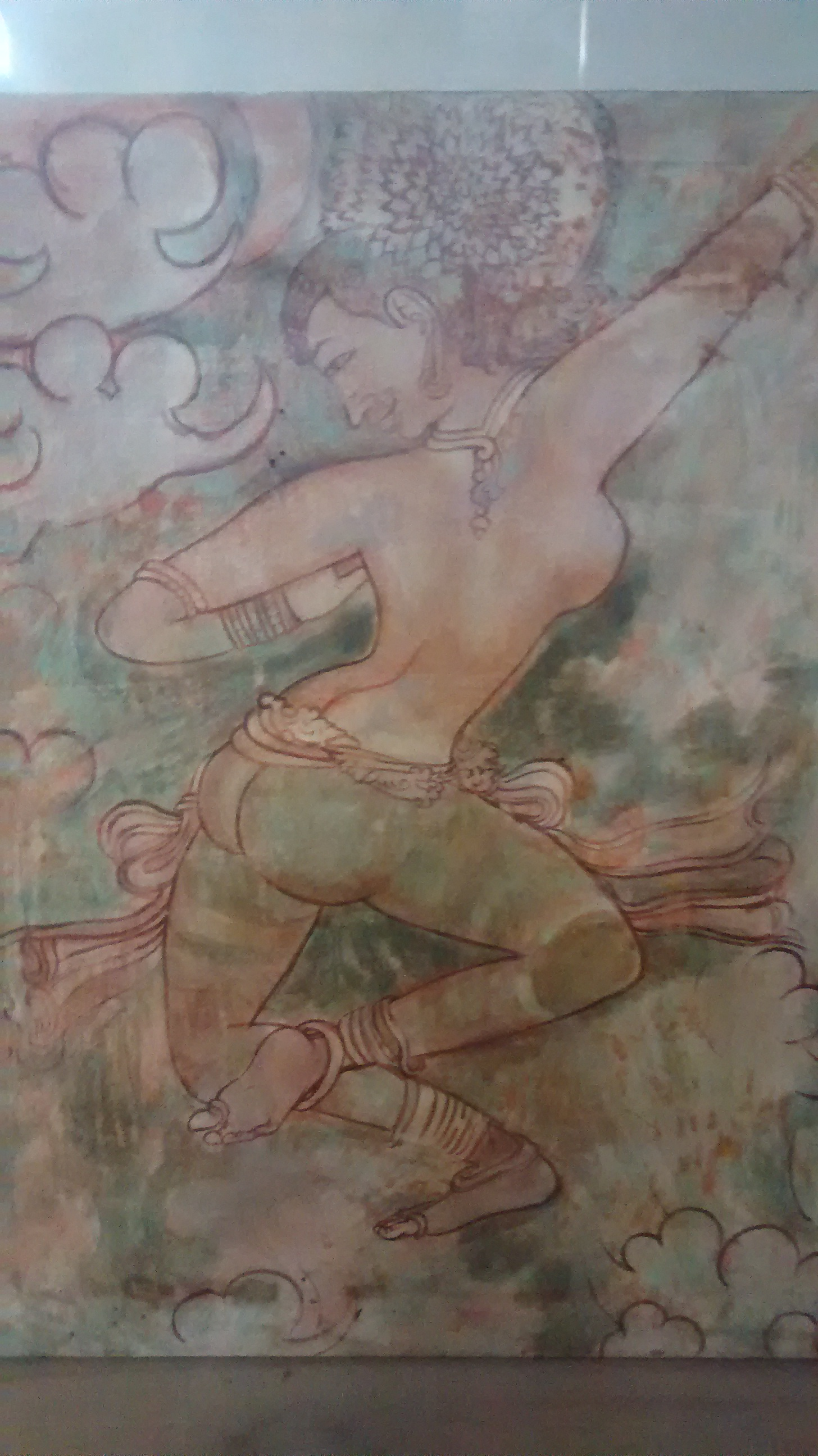
Sithanavaasal Paintings woman

The famous historical Fresco Paintings (similar to the Ajanta paintings) by the Jain saints are found inside the caves situated here. There are also the Jain beds of rock (Samanar Padukkai) Sittanavasal Cave is a rock-cut Jain monastery located at around 60 km from the city - it is an ideal place for a Sunday morning trip. Maintained by the ASI it also sports many attractions in the complex which helps kids have their fun quotient.

A rock-cut Jain temple named Arivar-Koil was carved here which sports paintings made during the 9th century. The most important reason to visit these caves is the paintings. The other attractions are finding out the mysteries behind the vibrating Om and how the Jain monks had lived during the 9th century.

The fresco paintings are similar to the ones found in Ajanta caves and are made using vegetable dye have now disappeared and disfigured due to vandalism until the ASI took over in 1958. There are 287 steps which lead to the top of the hillock, which has around 17 rock beds where the monks used to rest. The ascent to the top gives you a panoramic view of the small town below dispersed with small agricultural fields and lakes. It would make up for a good rock climbing session and prove to be fruitful with the scenery and impressive architecture on top. The historical monuments are a treat to the visitors who want to indulge themselves in a bit of history of the Jain and Pandya periods. Apart from these there are also two parks one the recreational park while the other is a Tamil Divine park and a recreational park which can be a good spot to click holiday pictures. There is also a small lake created for boating.

== Location ==
Wikimapia Route: En route to Pudukottai. Travel time: One hours and 30 mins. Things to carry: Cameras, umbrellas, water bottles. Timing: Throughout the day. Activity: Bird watching, boating, rock climbing, trekking. Places nearby: Pre historic megalithic burial sites, smaller rock cut caves.
