= Killukudy =

Village in India

- village
- Country: India
- State: Tamil Nadu
- District: Nagapattinam

Languages
  - Official: Tamil
- Time zone: UTC+5:30 (IST)

Killukudy is a village in the Kilvelur taluk of Nagapattinam district, Tamil Nadu, India.
