= Vettukadu =

- Village
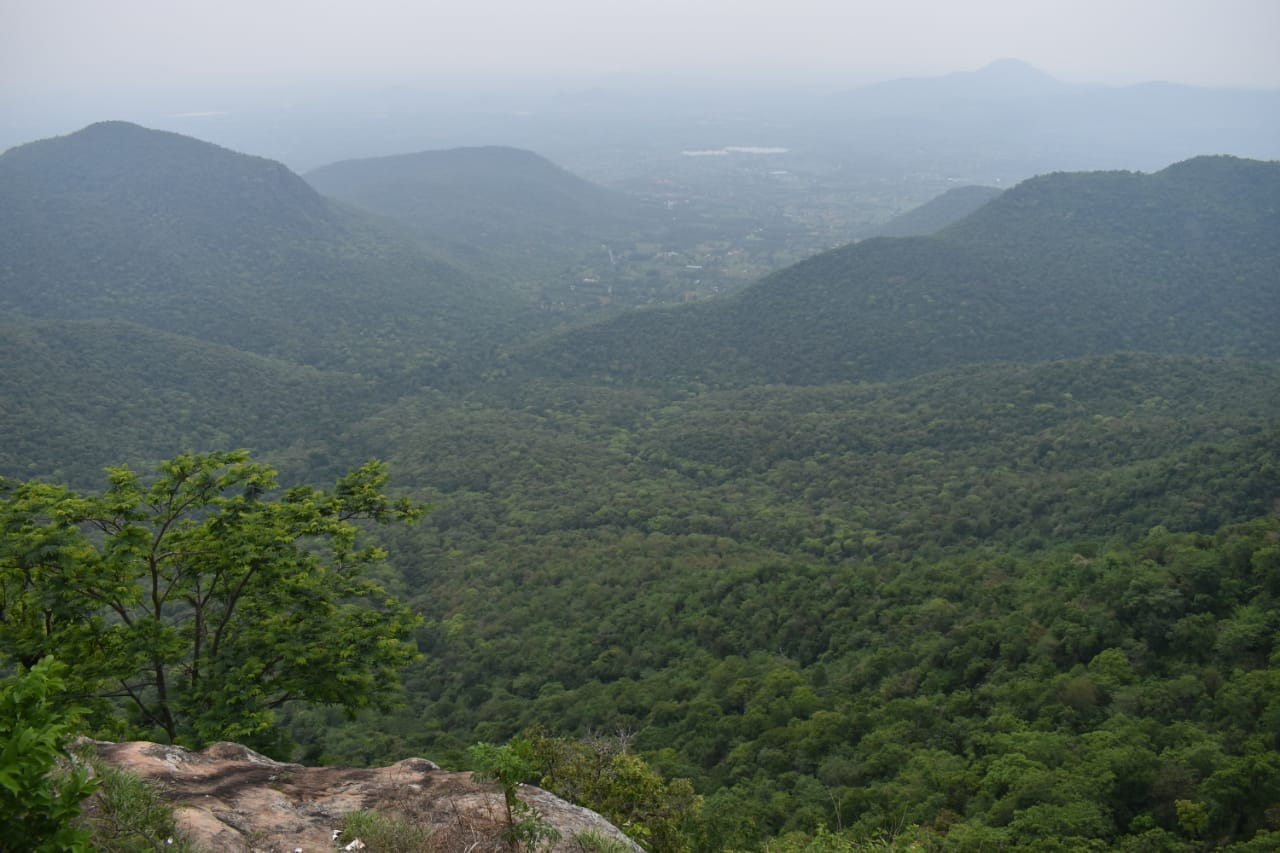

- Location in Tamil Nadu, India Vettukadu (India)
- Coordinates: 11°20′54″N 78°16′15″E
- Country: India
- State: Tamil Nadu
- District: Namakkal
- Taluk: Senthamangalam

Languages
  - Official: Tamil
- Time zone: UTC+5:30 (IST)
- PIN: 637402
- Vehicle registration: TN 28

Vettukadu is a village in Senthamangalam taluk of Namakkal district, Tamil Nadu, India

== Demographics ==
As per the 2001 census, Vettukadu had a total population of 2108 with 1027 males and 1081 females. Out of the total population 893 people were literate.
