= Thiruvengaivasal =

Village in India

- village
- Interactive map of Thiruvengaivasal
- Coordinates: 10°24′46″N 78°46′25″E
- Country: India
- State: Tamil Nadu
- District: Pudukkottai

Population (2001)
  - Total: 1,465

Languages
  - Official: Tamil
- Time zone: UTC+5:30 (IST)

Thiruvengaivasal is a village in the Annavasal revenue block of Pudukkottai district, Tamil Nadu, India.

== Demographics ==
As per the 2001 census, Thiruvengaivasal had a total population of 1465 with 762 males and 703 females. Out of the total population 649 people were literate.
