= Illuppur taluk =

Coordinates: 10.52°N 78.63°E

Illuppur taluk is a taluk of Pudukkottai district of the Indian state of Tamil Nadu. Its headquarters is the town of Iluppur. It has three temples and one church: Sri tharamthooki pidari amman kovil, Ponvasinathar temple (Shiva) and Srinivasa perumal temple (Perumal). St. Antony church and also three mosques are there. The Taluk office was constructed and opened in 2009.

Here there are three banks: Indian Overseas bank, Indian Bank and Central Bank of India, Maariamman Indian Bank.

From Trichy it is 40.1km from Pudukkottai it is 27.8 km & 35 minutes.

There is a government hospital in Illuppur.

Schools:

- R.C. Higher Secondary School
- Government Higher Secondary School
- Maharishi Vidhya Mandir CBSE School
- Mother Terasa Matriculation School
- Arul Malar Matriculation School

Foundations:

- Aims Foundation
- Aims Computer

== Population ==
According to the 2011 census, the taluk of Illuppur had a population of 218,961 with 108,866 males and 110,095 females. There were 1011 women for every 1000 men. The taluk had a literacy rate of 63.38. Child population in the age group below 6 was 12,718 males and 12,135 females.
