= Koduvai =

Town in Tamil Nadu, India

Koduvaai
- town
- Koduvai
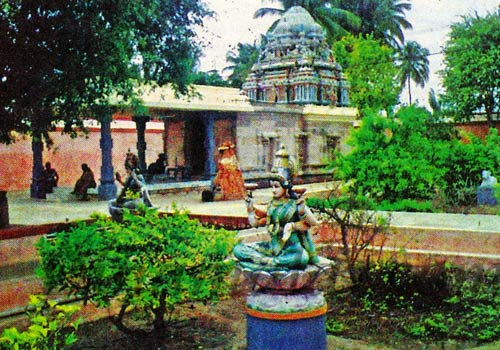
- Koduvai Nageshwarasamy Temple

- Location in Tamil Nadu, India
- Coordinates: 10°56′27″N 77°26′19″E
- Country: India
- State: Tamil Nadu
- Region: Kongu Nadu
- District: Tiruppur
- Taluk: Tiruppur south

Government
  - Body: Pongalur block
- Elevation: 357 m (1,171 ft)

Languages
  - Official: Tamil, English
- Time zone: UTC+5:30 (IST)
- PIN: 638660
- STD Code: 0421, 04258
- Vehicle registration: TN 42, TN 78

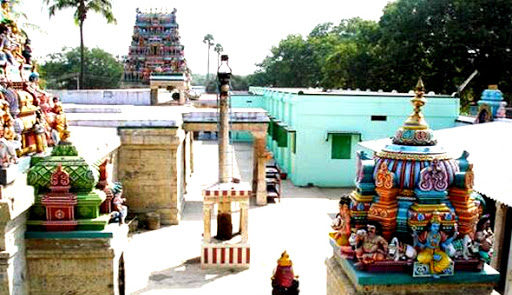
Bairavar Temple in Kundadam, Tiruppur district, Tamil Badu, India

Koduvai (Koduvāi) is a small town in Tiruppur District in Tamil Nadu, India. It comes under Pongalur block and Tiruppur South taluk. It is located 26 km away from Dharapuram and 25 km from Tiruppur in Tiruppur-Dharapuram highway. The town houses famous temples including NageswaraSami Temple and PeriyaPerumal Temple.

== Economy ==
Koduvai's economy is based on Agriculture and Handloom Industries. Being proximer to Tiruppur, it also houses some Textile based industries. The town also houses Koduvai Sarvodaya Sangh.

== Administration and politics ==
Koduvai was a part of Coimbatore district and later Erode district and now Tiruppur district. It falls under Tiruppur South Assembly constituency and Tiruppur Lok Sabha constituency .

AIADMK, DMK and BJP are the major political parties in this area.

This town houses banks and government hospital.

== Connectivity ==
Nearby Bus terminal is Dharapuram city bus terminal. There are buses available 24/7 to Tiruppur, Coimbatore, Dharapuram, Palladam, Madurai, Oddanchatram, Palani and Dindigul. It is also connected to nearby towns like Kangeyam, Uthiyur, Kundadam, Pongalur and AvinashiPalayam via town buses. Nearby Railway station is Tiruppur railway station and nearby airport is Coimbatore International Airport.

== See also ==
- Dharapuram
- Uthiyur
- Tiruppur
