= Kalikkavalasu =

Village in India

Kalikkavalasu is a village near Chennimalai in Erode district of Tamil Nadu, India. The village is an industrial area with many dyeing units and handlooms. The local temples are Pillayar Kovil, Karuppana Swamy Kovil, and Maduraiveeran temple.

== Demographics ==
This village has a population of around 300. Most belong to kongu vellala gounder community. The people of this village are prosperous and influential in the Chennimalai area. The population is gradually migrating from village towards Arachalur Road and is growing. The area is gradually urbanizing.

== Economy ==
Almost no one in the village is below the poverty line. One-hundred percent of the children attend school.

Kalicoptex is primarily an industrial weaver's cooperative society which employs more than 2,500 people. The cooperative exports woven products worldwide.

== Transport ==
Bus route C10 connects the village with Chennimalai and Sivagiri via Arachalur and Vilakkethi. Kalikkavalasu also has bus service to Erode, Karur, Tirupur, Kangeyam, Vellakovil, Kodumudi, Mulanur, Tiruchengode, Muthur, and elsewhere.

== Lake ==
Kalikkavalasu has a lake that floods during every north-east monsoon. It attracts birds after December. The lake gets water from the stream carrying overflow from Namakkalpalayam lake. This lake is the main source of underground water for nearby villages.

== Agriculture ==
The main source of irrigation is wells. Crops like coconut, banana, sorghum, maize, and pulses grow very well due to the red soil and tropical climate. Cattle rearing is common and successful.

== Festivals ==
Nearby festivals include Chennimalai 'Thai Thaer' Festival, Vagaithozhuvu Amman Kovil Thiruvizha, Murungathozhuvu Marriamman Pongal and Karuppannaswamy Pongal festival.

== Nearby villages ==
- Komarapalayam (1 km)
- Murungathozhuvu (2 km)
- Soolaipudur (1 km)
- Arachalur (7 km)
- Chennimalai (4 km)
- Kangeyam (22 km)
- Ammapalayam (2.5 km)
- Erode (30 km)

== Government ==
Kalikkavalasu belongs to Murungathozhuvu Panchayat in Chennimalai Union. It is in Kangeyam State Assembly Constituency and Erode Lok Sabha Constituency.
