= Uthanda Velayudhaswamy temple, Uthiyur =

Temple in Tiruppur district, Tamil Nadu, India

Arulmigu Uthanda Velayudhaswamy Temple
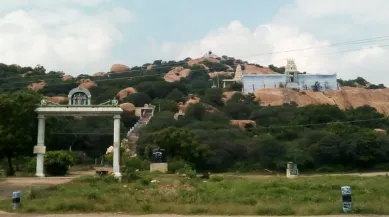
- Uthanda Velayudhaswamy HillTemple at Uthiyur Hills

- Location in Tamil Nadu

Religion
- Affiliation: Hinduism
- District: Tiruppur
- Deity: Velayudhasamy(Kartikeya), Valli, Deivanai
- Festivals: Thaipoosam, Panguni Uthiram, Karthikai Deepam
- Governing body: Hindu Religious and Charitable Endowments Department, Commissioner, Sivanmalai, Tiruppur
- Status: functional

Location
- Location: Uthiyur Hills
- State: Tamil Nadu
- Country: India
- Interactive map of Arulmigu Uthanda Velayudhaswamy Temple
- Coordinates: 10°53′31″N 77°31′28″E

Architecture
- Type: Dravidian architecture
- Creator: Kongana Siddhar
- Established: 9th century AD

Specifications
- Monument: 10 shrines
- Inscriptions: 9th century Tamil
- Elevation: 314 m (1,030 ft)

Website
- Uthanda Velayudasamy Uthiyur HRCE

Arulmigu Uthanda Velayudhaswamy temple (Arulmigu Uttaṇṭa vēlāyudhasāmy tirukkōvil) is a historic 9th century old Hindu temple located on the Uthiyur Hills near Uthiyur in the Tiruppur district, Tamil Nadu, India. It is dedicated to lord Velayudhasamy, a form of Kartikeya and his consorts Valli and Deivanai. The temple is located at the hilltop of the ancient Hills patronised by Arunagirinathar authored Thiruppugal.

It is one of the most prominent temples of Lord Muruga in Tirupur district. It is located along the Erode - Dharapuram Tamil Nadu State Highway 83A, 14Km from town of Kangeyam and 18Km from Dharapuram.

== Functioning ==
This Shaivite temple built in dravidian architecture follows Karana Agama rules based on Saiva Siddhanta philosophy. 2 periods of puja have been conducted for this temple. This temple owns 1500 acres of land. Annual festival is held on Panguni month in this temple. This temple is an important pilgrimage for Palani Pada Yatra devotees.

== History ==
The temple belongs to the ninth century. This temple is considered auspicious for Kongu Velalar Gounder community as it is partionised by sage Konganar who is a Siddhar from the same community. The Uthiyur Hills is referred to as Uthimalai in the Thirupugal anthology (songs 611, 612).

== Temple board ==
This temple has a sanctums for Kalikumaraswamy, Kailasanadhar and Idumbakumarasamy. The temple is under the control of the Hindu Charities Department under the category of Principal Temples. It is administered by a non-hereditary trustee system.

== Temple structure ==
It is situated 100 steps above the ground on top of the Uthiyur hills. The temple entrance is on the south side. In the east is the Rajagopuram with the gate. In the sanctum sanctorum, Uthanda Velayudha Swami stands five feet high towards the east. It is noteworthy that his statue is located towards the west in the direction of Lord Palani. Adjacent to him are the shrines of Lord Ganesha and Bhairava.

== Other shrines in Uthiyur Hills ==
Konkana Siddhar Temple and Thavapeedam, Uthandavelayudaswamy Temple, Mariamman Temple, Idumbakumaraswamy Temple, Uchivinayakar Thirukoil, Hanumantharayaswamy Temple, Prakalanayaki Sametha - Kailasanathar Temple, Chetty Thambiran Siddhar Temple are other temples located in the Uthiyur Hills.
