= Nilali Goundam Palayam =

Goundam Palayam
- village
- Location in Tamil Nadu, India
- Coordinates: 10°54′56″N 77°29′04″E
- Country: India
- State: Tamil Nadu
- District: Tiruppur
- Taluk: Kangeyam

Government
  - Type: village panchayat

Languages
  - Official: Tamil
- Time zone: UTC+5:30 (IST)

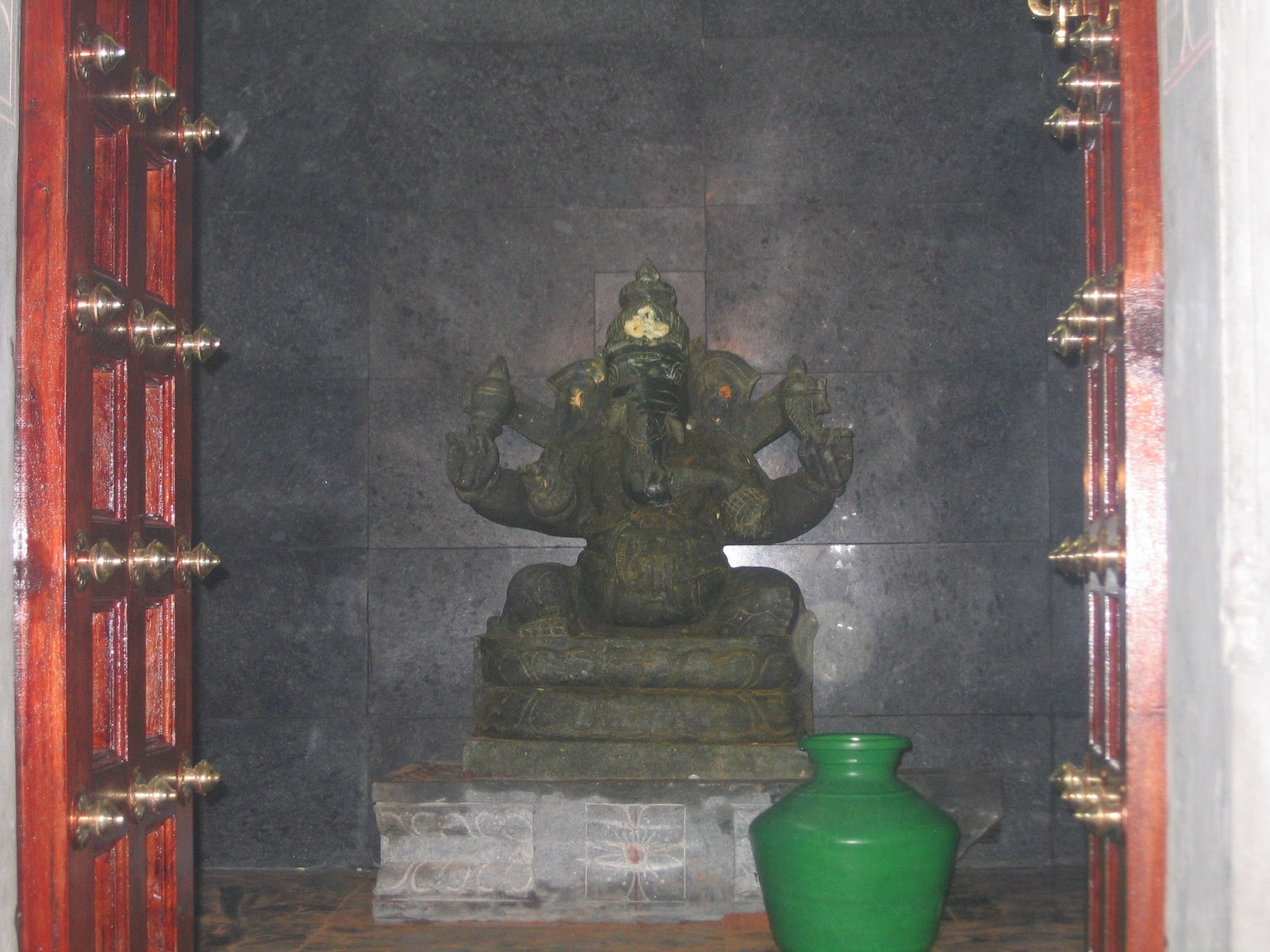
Karpaga Vinayagar - Nilali Goundam Palayam

Nilali Goundam Palayam is a village in the Kangeyam taluk of Tiruppur District of Tamil Nadu. It is located in the Uthiyur-Koduvai road.

The village houses a government Mid school and many temples.

Political parties that are prominent here include Dravida Munnetra Kazhagam (DMK), All India Anna Dravida Munnetra Kazhagam (AIADMK) and Bharatiya Janata Party (BJP).

Nearby Towns include Uthiyur, Kundadam, Kangeyam, Koduvai and Dharapuram.
