= State Highway 83A (Tamil Nadu) =

State highway in Tamil Nadu

State Highway 83A

Route information
- Maintained by Highways and Minor Ports Department
- Length: 78 km (48 mi)

Major junctions
- North end: Erode
- South end: Dharapuram

Location
- Country: India
- State: Tamil Nadu
- Districts: Erode, Tiruppur.
- Primary destinations: Avalpoondurai, Arachalur, Kangeyam, Uthiyur, Dharapuram

Highway system
- Roads in India; Expressways; National; State; Asian; State Highways in Tamil Nadu

State Highway 83A is a four-lane state highway in Tamil Nadu connecting Erode with Dharapuram. It runs in Erode district and Tirupur District of Tamil Nadu, India.

== Route ==
The highway passes through Avalpoondurai, Arachalur, Kangeyam, Uthiyur to a length of 78 km.

== Major junctions ==
- NH 381A at Moolapalayam, Erode
- Erode Ring Road near Anaikkalpalayam
- State Highway 172 at Kangeyam
- National Highway NH-81 at Kangeyam
- State Highway 37 at Dharapuram
- State Highway 21 at Dharapuram
- State Highway 97 at Dharapuram
- State Highway 83 SH 83 at Dharapuram
