= Chennimalai =

- Town
- Chennimalai, Tamil Nadu
- Coordinates: 11.167600°N 77.604200°E
- Country: India
- State: Tamil Nadu
- District: Erode
- Elevation: 330 m (1,080 ft)

Population (2001)
  - Total: 30,000 (est.)

Languages
  - Official: Tamil
- Time zone: UTC+5:30 (IST)
- PIN: 638051
- Telephone code: 914294
- Vehicle registration: TN-56

Chennimalai is a town in Erode district, Tamil Nadu, India. It is situated at about 24 km from Erode. In Tamil, Chenni means Chief and Malai means Hill. It is popularly known as the 'Handloom Town'.

== History ==
Kodumanal is a village located near Chennimalai in the Erode district in the southern Indian state of Tamil Nadu. It was once a flourishing ancient trade city known as Kodumanam, as inscribed in Patittrupathu of Sangam literature. The place is an important archaeological site, under the control of the State Archaeological Department of Tamil Nadu. It is located on the northern banks of Noyyal River, a tributary of the Cauvery.

=== The ancient city ===
The inhabitants of this destroyed ancient city of Chera dynasty were highly skilled craftsmen, who were specialized in making beads and high-quality iron. The place is referred to in Sangam literature as an important industrial centre that had links with the Chola port city of Kaveripoompattinam, now called Poompuhar.

=== Roman trade route ===
The city played a major role in Indo-Roman trade and relations, as the ancient city is located on the mid-way of a Roman trade route, linking Muziris port on the Malabar Coast with the Kaveripoompattinam (Puhar) Port in the Coromandel Coast.

=== Megalithic tombs ===
Excavations have been carried out and it came out with the layers of a megalithic-cum-early tombs of historic period. Also there were two female and one male human skeleton were recovered from a pit burial in this site. A set of 300 megalithic tombs of different types and sizes were observed and recorded in this area.

The ancient city has been destroyed in time and now the area is available with the remains of a megalithic settlement dating back to the 2nd century BCE. Apparently, this was the centre for the Romans who visited to obtain beryls from Kodumanal. The megalithic communities that flourished in this site belong to the period of the 2nd century BCE to 2nd century CE.

=== Iron and metal ===
This place was once celebrated for its trade in precious stones like Garnet, Carnelian, Lapis Lazuli, Sapphire and Quartz. The people of this city were experts in manufacturing the finest iron. The Iron Pillar in Qutub Complex in Delhi, a rustless wonder, was built from the wrought iron produced from this place.

=== Collections ===
Excavations also came out with ancient iron objects such as arrowheads and swords. Also they have collected Roman artefacts, iron-melting furnaces, beads, shell bangles and pottery with the Brahmi scripts from the habitation deposits and burials. The other collections from the excavation of this site include roulette pottery, Roman silver coins, and gold and silver spirals. A bronze statue of a lion and an iron-melting furnace were important helpful in deciding the past history.

== Geography ==
Chennimalai is located at 11.17°N 77.62°E. It has an average elevation of 320 metres (1082 feet).

Noyyal river was the water source of this town, which is now polluted by the effluents released by the dyeing and industrial wastes.

=== Chennimalai Hill ===
Chennimalai Hill is situated of about 1700 acres. This temple is situated at about 400 meters/1749 feet above sea level, and this hill is noted for its natural flora and fauna. In Devanagiri this hill is called Siragiri and Chenniyangiri. In Tamil it is called Chennimalai. This hill is also called Pushpagiri and Sigaragiri. The city underneath the hill is also called Chennimalai.

The Lord of this mountain 'Kurinji Andavar', also called as "Chennimalai Murugan" is highly praised and sung with reference to this abode in Kundruthorâdal. "Kandha Sasti Kavacham" was staged here. Temple opened for darshan from 6a.m. to 8p.m. Temple buses are available to reach the shrine. Punnakku Siddar was one of a Sithar lived here. He taught, the Tongue which utters lie was termed as Punnakku which means wound of the tongue, and hence he called as such. His meditation cave is also situated here.

The hill is home to peacocks, monkeys, rabbits, snakes and other reptiles. There have been sightings of Chital (spotted deer) around Chennimalai.

Flora includes trees like Neem, Banyan, Tamarind and a variety of shrubs. Mountain of Sivanmalai is clearly visible from the top of the hill. It takes a 15 minutes drive to reach the hill temple by road, travelling through a lush green forest with steep slopes on the sides. 1320 steps to climb up.

== Demographics ==
As of 2011 India census, Chennimalai urban agglomeration has a population more than 30,000. Males constitute 51% of the population and females 49%. Chennimalai has an average literacy rate of 75%, higher than the national average of 59.5%; with male literacy of 83% and female literacy of 67%. 8% of the population is under 6 years of age.

== Economy ==
=== Textile industry ===
The people here produce many handmade fabrics, such as bedspreads, Lungies, etc., but the problem is unemployment. Chennimalai is the home for various handloom co-operative societies such as Kalicoptex and Chencoptex among others.

These co-operative societies are the employers for thousands of weavers. For providing housing facilities to the handloom weavers, a colony of 1010 individual houses (considered to be one of the biggest weavers colonies in Asia) were built at the outskirts of Chennimalai City. Later, around 350 individual houses had been constructed for the weavers of Kalicoptex at three different locations around Chennimalai.

Powerlooms also give plenty of employment opportunity to the people of Chennimalai. At any time, one can hear the noise of powerlooms operated in Chennimalai area. Hence, Chennimalai faces the problem of noise pollution and also air pollution due to dust from the looms. The fabric made here is of extremely high quality and hence preferred by North Indians during winter despite the cost.

== Culture ==
=== Chennimalai Subramanya Swamy Temple ===
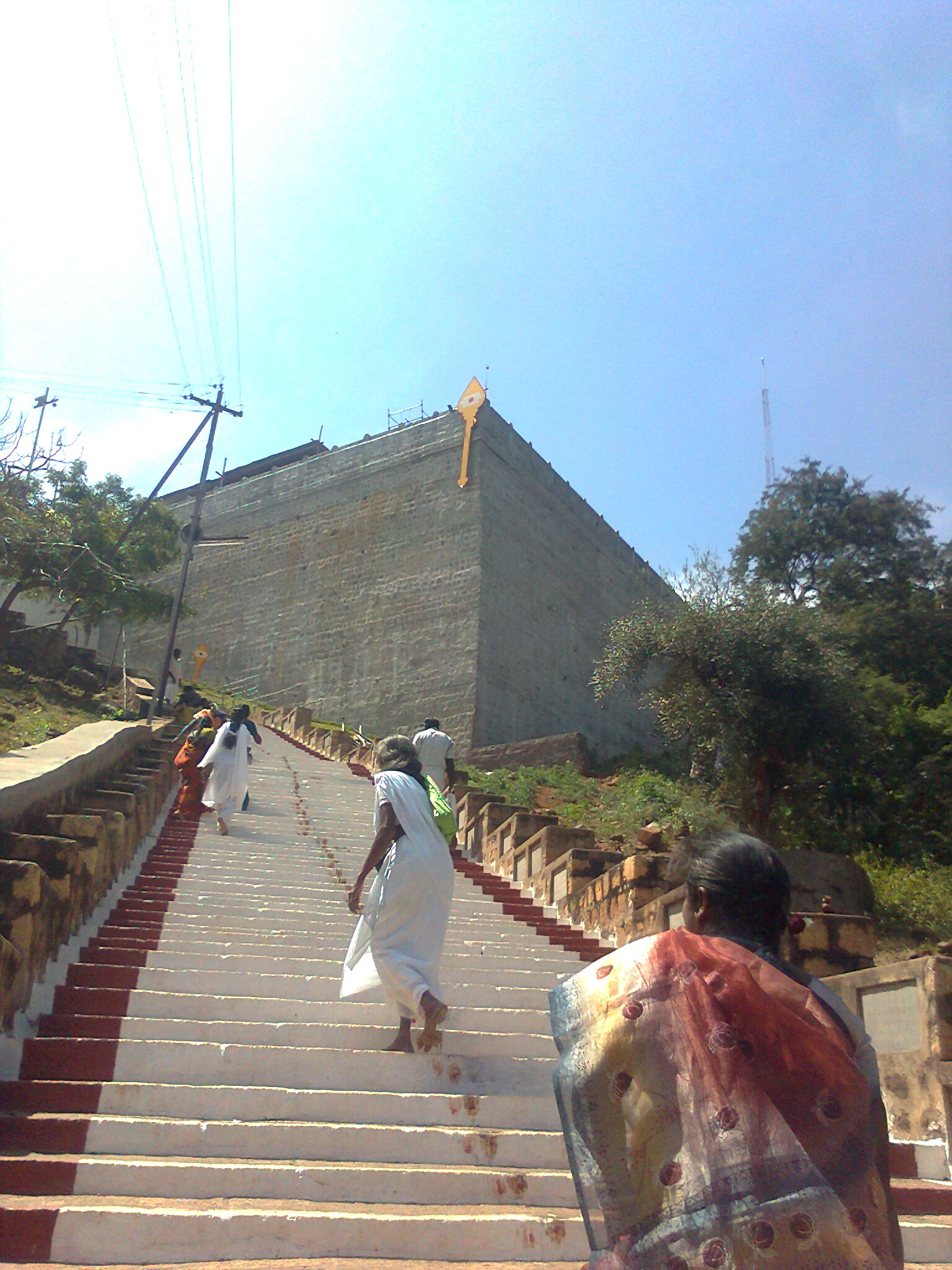
Chennimalai Murugan Temple

It is a Hindu temple dedicated to Lord Muruga.

The temple of Chennimalai is situated on the banks of Noyyal also called Kânchima Nadhi. The Sanctum Sanctorum faces the east. Just in front of the temple, one finds the Puliyadi Vinâyagar. Inside the temple to the right of Moolavar are the shrines of Mârkandeswarar and to the left Umayavalli. On the left side are the shrines of Kasi Viswanâthar and Visâlâkshi.

The steps behind Moolavar Sannidhi lead to the Valli Teyvannai Temple. The two consorts enshrined in a separate temple constitute a unique phenomenon. The Punnâkau Siddhar cave with the front yard filled with 'Vel' of different sizes and shapes is on top of the hill. This Siddhar is one of the popular 18 Siddhas known to the world for their Siddha yoga. Saravana Mâmunivar's tomb is near the cave. There is an old cave near this temple.

The 'Ratha oorvalam' is held every Tuesday evening.

=== Valli Dheivaanai Temple ===
Farther up behind the Murugan temple is the Valli Dheivaanai temple. They are in penance to attain Lord Muruga. They are known by the names Amirthavalli and Sundaravalli. A separate temple for Valli and Dheivaanai is another unique feature of this temple.

The holy water for Abishekam is being brought every day by the temple bulls from the well located at Adivaram by crossing 1320 steps to reach the temple, which are being maintained by the Devasthanam.

=== Festival ===
The car festival that comes in the Tamil month of 'Thai' attracts devotees flooding the temple of Lord Muruga. The car starts from East Raja street, then through South Raja street, West Raja street and North Raja street again reaches East Raja Street. The town remains flooded by devotees for almost a week and many temporary shops occupy the road sides.

Other important festivals are Chitra Pournami, Kanda sashti, Agni Nakshathram, Panguni Thaer, Chennimalai Mariamman festival, Ekkattampalayam Mariamman festival, and Murungathozhuvu Mariamman festival. During the second day of Pongal 'Poo Parikkum Thiruvizha' is celebrated as a part of Pongal celebrations and can see people going to the hills for plucking holy flowers, having food in the hills sharing with friends and relatives and performing 'Kummi' songs and dance which is unique to Kongu tradition and culture.

== Transport ==
Chennimalai has a bus stand located at the southern end of the town. Important landmarks of the town are Kumaran Sathukkam (Vandipettai), Thaer Nilayam, Sandhai and Kumarapuri. Kanuvai is a narrow pass in the Chennimalai hill which is traversed by SH 96 and offers a scenic drive for the travellers.

There are frequent buses available to Chennimalai from Tiruppur, Erode, Vellode, Avalpoondurai, Arachalur, Perundurai, Bhavani, Vijayamangalam, Kangeyam, Dharapuram, Palani, Karur, Salem and various other towns of Tamil Nadu. The nearest airport is Coimbatore Airport.

Chennimalai is located in the main bus route between Erode and Dharapuram. TNSTC is operating new services from Palani to Bangalore, Erode to Dharapuram and Gobi to Madurai via Chennimalai.

SH-96 passes through Chennimalai town connecting Erode with Dharapuram and Kangeyam via Perundurai. There is also a proposal for a new state highway connecting Tirupur with Karur via Chennimalai and Uthukuli.

A proposed rail route between Erode and Palani is going to benefit the people of Chennimalai and to make a tourism circuit connecting the temples of Lord Muruga at Palani, Sivanmalai and Chennimalai.

1. SH 189

== Education ==
=== Schools ===
- Komarappa Sengunthar Higher Secondary School
- Komarappa Sengunthar Girls High School
- Government High School, Ammapalayam
- Panchayat Union Middle School, Chennimalai
- Ramakrishna Matriculation school
- Vimala Matriculation Higher Secondary School
- Kongu Vellalar Matriculation Higher Secondary School
- Young India Higher Secondary School
- Adithya Public school
- shemford cbse school

=== Polytechnic colleges ===
- Shri Rajiv Gandhi Polytechnic College

=== Colleges ===
- MPNMJ(M.P.Nachimuthu Mudaliar - M.Jaganathan Mudaliar) Engineering College
- The Hindustan Arts and Science College, Ingur

== Notable people ==
Kodi Katha Kumaran (a) Tiruppur Kumaran (1904–1932), who was born in Chennimalai, was an Indian revolutionary who participated in the Indian independence movement.

== Neighbouring towns ==
- Arachalur, Panchayath town (14 km)
- Erode, Turmeric, Textile hub (25 km)
- Karur, textile city (55 km)
- Kangeyam, cattle and oil city (18 km)
- Dharapuram, coconut city (50 km)
- Perundurai, industrial town (13 km)
- Tirupur, textile city (30 km)
- Avalpoondurai, panchayat town (19 km)

== See also ==
- Chennimalai block
- Perundurai
- Kangeyam
- Uthiyur
