= Pongalur =

Town in Tamil Nadu, India

- Town
- Pongaloor
- Location in Tamil Nadu, India
- Coordinates: 10°58′14.7″N 77°22′10.7″E
- Country: India
- State: Tamil Nadu
- Region: Kongu Nadu
- District: Tiruppur
- Taluk: Palladam

Government
  - Type: Town Panchayat
  - Body: Pongalur block
- Elevation: 305 m (1,001 ft)

Population (2011)
  - Total: 11,688

Languages
  - Official: Tamil, English
- Time zone: UTC+5:30 (IST)
- PIN: 641667
- STD Code: 04258
- Website: tiruppur.nic.in/directory/pongalur2/

Pongalur is a small town located in Palladam Taluk of Tiruppur district in Tamil Nadu, India. It is located along the Coimbatore - Trichy National highway and headquarters the Pongalur block. It is located 10 km from Palladam, 22 km from Kangeyam, 35 km from Dharapuram and 20 km from district headquarter Tiruppur and 50 km from Coimbatore. It is known for its famous Varadharaja perumal Temple.

== Administration and politics ==
Pongalur was a part of Coimbatore district and now Tiruppur district. Kundadam comes under Palladam taluk, Tiruppur district and headquarters of Pongalur block. It falls under Pongalur Assembly constituency and Tiruppur Lok Sabha constituency.

Kongu Vellalars are the dominant community in this area. AIADMK, DMK and BJP are the major political parties in this area. This town also houses a police station.

== See also ==
- Avinashi
- Dharapuram
- Palladam
- Uthiyur
