= Lakkamanaickenpatti =

Town in Tamil Nadu, India

- village
- Lakkamanāyakkaṉpaṭṭi
- Location in Tamil Nadu, India
- Coordinates: 10°52′16.8″N 77°38′33.5″E
- Country: India
- State: Tamil Nadu
- Region: Kongu Nadu
- District: Tiruppur
- Taluk: Kangeyam

Government
  - Body: Vellakovil block
- Elevation: 231 m (758 ft)

Population (2011)
  - Total: 4,177

Languages
  - Official: Tamil, English
- Time zone: UTC+5:30 (IST)
- PIN: 638111
- STD Code: 04257
- Vehicle registration: TN 42y

Lakkamanaickenpatti (or Lakkamanāyakkaṉpaṭṭi) is a village located near Vellakoil of Tiruppur district in Tamil Nadu, India.

== Administration and politics ==
Lakkamanaickenpatti was a part of Coimbatore district and later Erode district and now Tiruppur district. Lakkamanaickenpatti comes under Kangayam taluk, Tiruppur district and headquarters of Vellakovil block. It falls under Kangayam Assembly constituency and Erode Lok Sabha constituency.

AIADMK, DMK and BJP are the major political parties in this area.

== See also ==
- Vellakoil
- Dharapuram
- Uthiyur
