= Kangayam cattle =

Indian breed of cattle

Kangayam
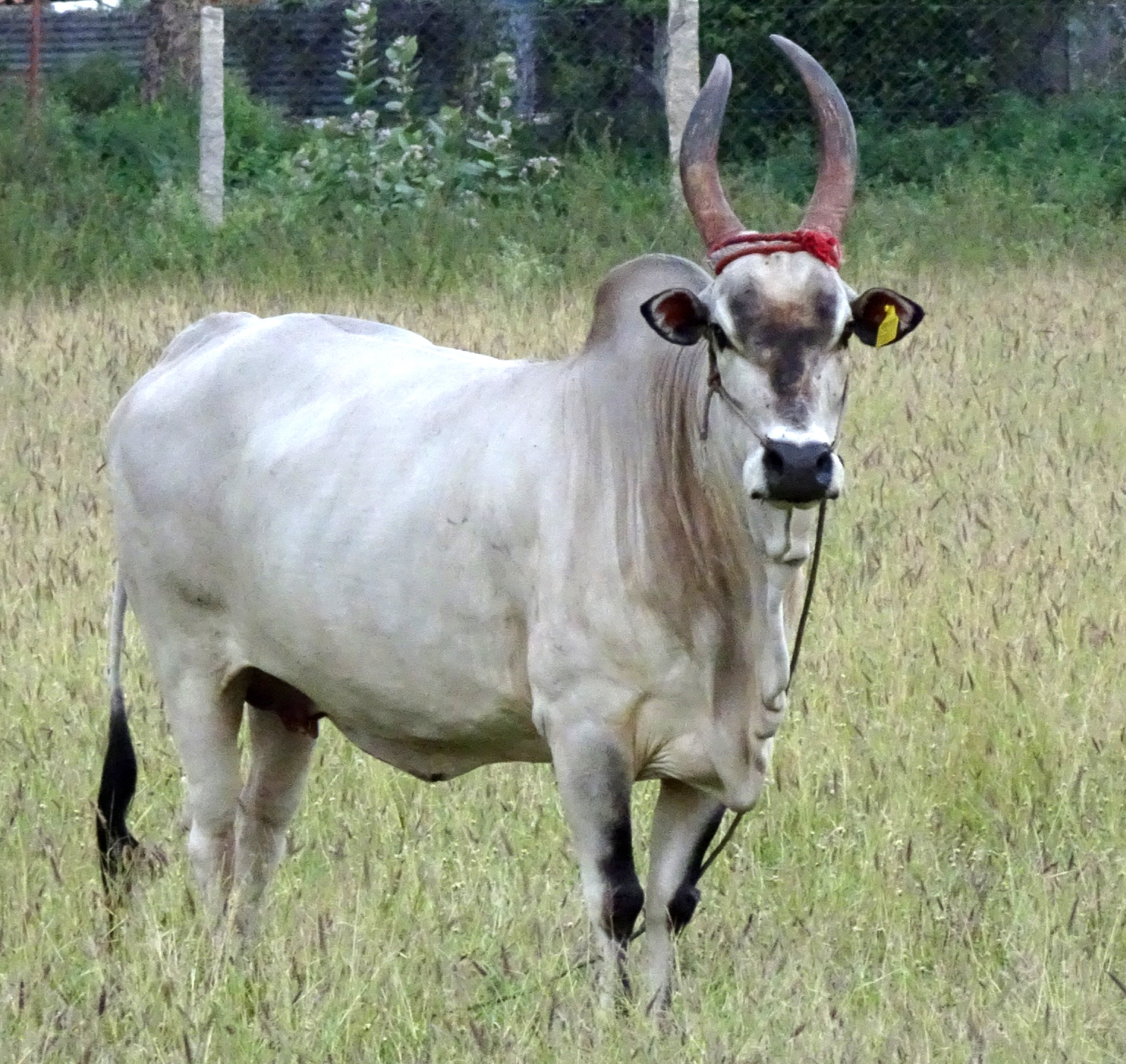
- Cow

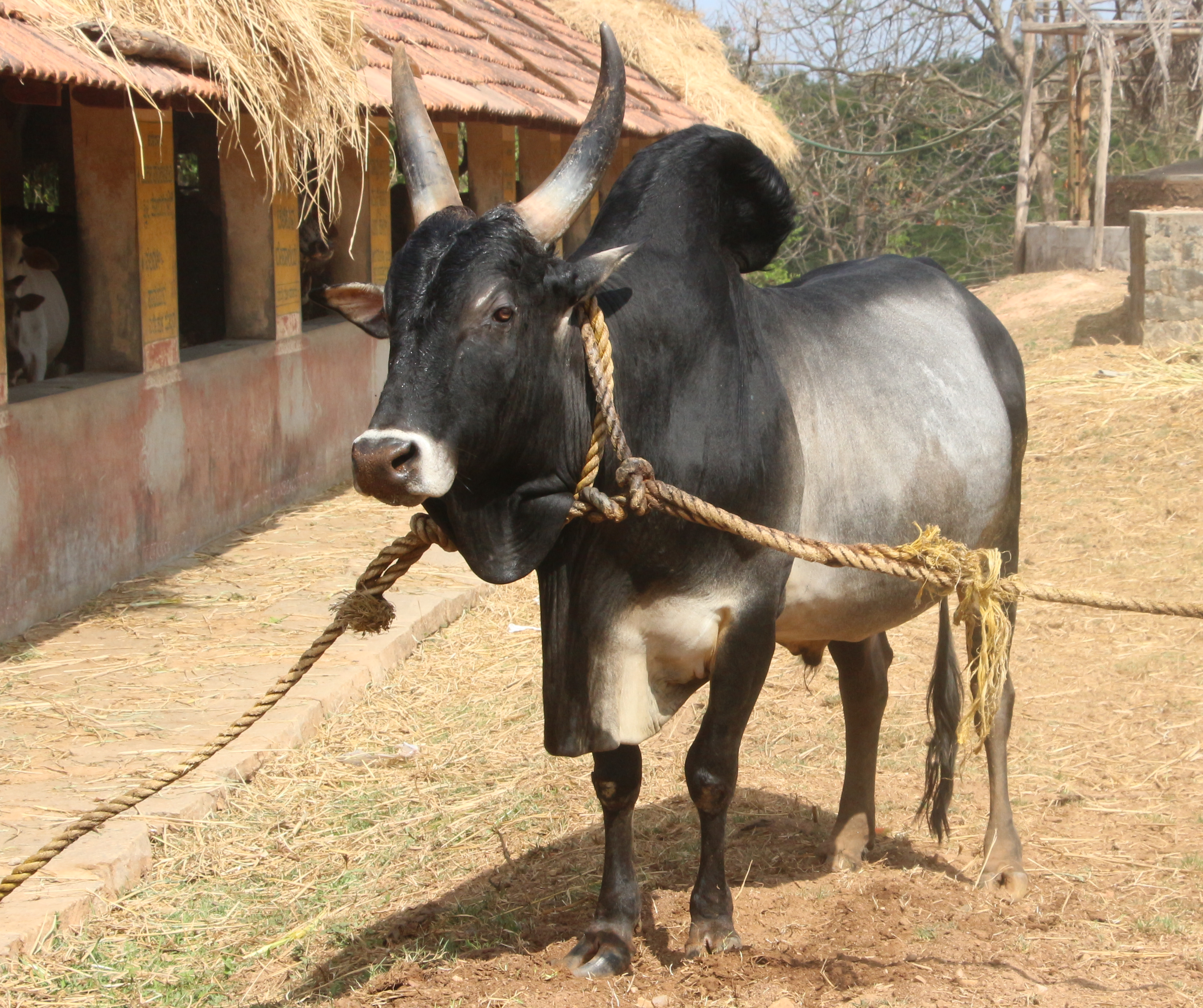
- Bull
- Conservation status: FAO (2007): not at risk; DAD-IS (2021): not at risk
- Other names: Kangeyam; Kanganad; Kongu; Cangaian (in Brazil)
- Country of origin: India

Traits
- Weight: Male: 523 kg; Female: 341 kg
- Height: Male: 140 cm; Female: 125 cm
- Coat: grey, darker in bulls
- Horn status: horned
- Cattle; Bos (primigenius) indicus

The Kangayam or Kangeyam is an Indian breed of draught cattle from the state of Tamil Nadu, in South India. Its area of origin is Kongu Nadu, the region surrounding Coimbatore, close to the border between Tamil Nadu and Kerala, but it is distributed over a considerably wider area. The breed name derives from that of the town of Kangeyam. It may also be called Kanganad or Kongu.

== History ==
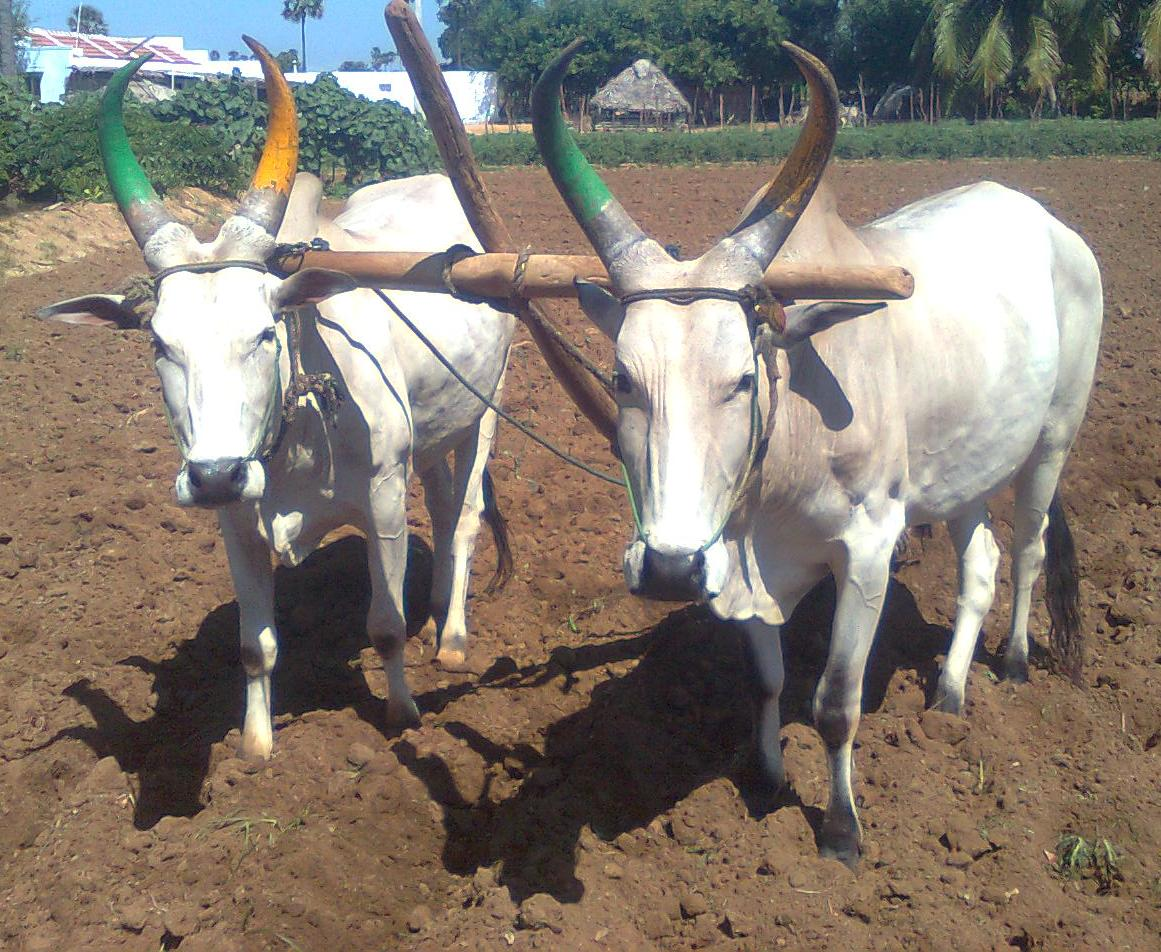
A yoked pair

The Kangayam is a traditional draught breed of Tamil Nadu. It is not closely related to the other draught breed of the state, the Umblachery, but may have received some influence from the Ongole of Andhra Pradesh. Its area of origin is the region surrounding Coimbatore, close to the border between Tamil Nadu and Kerala, but it is distributed over a considerably wider area; the name of the breed derives from that of the taluk of Kangeyam in Tiruppur District.

In 1996 there were 479000 of the cattle; in 2022 a total population of between 127500 and 152500 head was reported to the DAD-IS database of the Food and Agriculture Organization of the United Nations.

It has been exported to Brazil, where it is called the Cangaian.

== Characteristics ==
The Kangayam is of medium size, with a height at the withers of some 125–140 cm and a body weight of 340–525 kg; two body types are described, a larger and a smaller.

The calves are red when born, but change to grey by the age of two; cows are grey or dark grey, bulls are darker and may be black on the head and foreparts. The colour of cows and oxen fades as they age, and cows may become completely white.

== Use ==
The Kangayam was one of the two principal draught breeds used in Tamil Nadu, the other being the Hallikar. The cows give little milk: annual yield is in the range 342–1455 kg, with an average of 540 kg; the fat content is approximately 3.9%.

Bulls are used in traditional bull races, as are Hallikar and Ongole bulls. They are also commonly used in the traditional sport of Jallikattu.
