= NH 136 =

NH 136 may refer to:

- National Highway 136 (India)
- New Hampshire Route 136, United States
