= National Highway 381B (India) =

National highway in India

National Highway 381B
- Map of National Highway 381B in red

Route information
- Auxiliary route of NH 81
- Length: 62 km (39 mi)

Major junctions
- South end: Musiri
- North end: Namakkal

Location
- Country: India
- States: Tamil Nadu

Highway system
- Roads in India; Expressways; National; State; Asian
← NH 81	→ NH 44

National Highway 381B, commonly referred to as NH 381B, is an inter-corridor highway connecting Musiri along NH-81 with Namakkal along NH-44 in South India. It is a spur road of National Highway 81. NH-381B traverses the state of Tamil Nadu in India.

== Route ==
NH 381B connects Musiri, Thottiyam, Ezlurpatty, Meikalnaikanpatty and Namakkal.

== Junctions ==
NH 81 Terminal near Musiri.
NH 44 Terminal near Namakkal.

== See also ==
- List of national highways in India
- List of national highways in India by state
