= National Highway 381 (India) =

National highway in India

National Highway 381
- Map of the National Highway in red

Route information
- Length: 31.8 km (19.8 mi)

Major junctions
- South end: Avinashipalayam
- North end: Avinashi

Location
- Country: India
- States: Tamil Nadu
- Primary destinations: Tiruppur

Highway system
- Roads in India; Expressways; National; State; Asian
← NH 81	→ NH 544

National Highway 381, commonly referred to as NH 381, is a national highway of India. It is a spur road of National Highway 81. NH-381 traverses the state of Tamil Nadu in India.

== Route ==
It starts from NH 81 near Avinashipalayam and terminates at NH 544 near Avinashi. This highway passes through the city of Tiruppur.

== Junctions ==
NH 81 Terminal near Avinashipalayam.
NH 544 Terminal near Avinashi.

== See also ==
- List of national highways in India
- List of national highways in India by state
