= Uthiyur =

Historical Town in Tamil Nadu, India

Uthiyur Ūthiyūr
- Historical Town
- Uthiyur
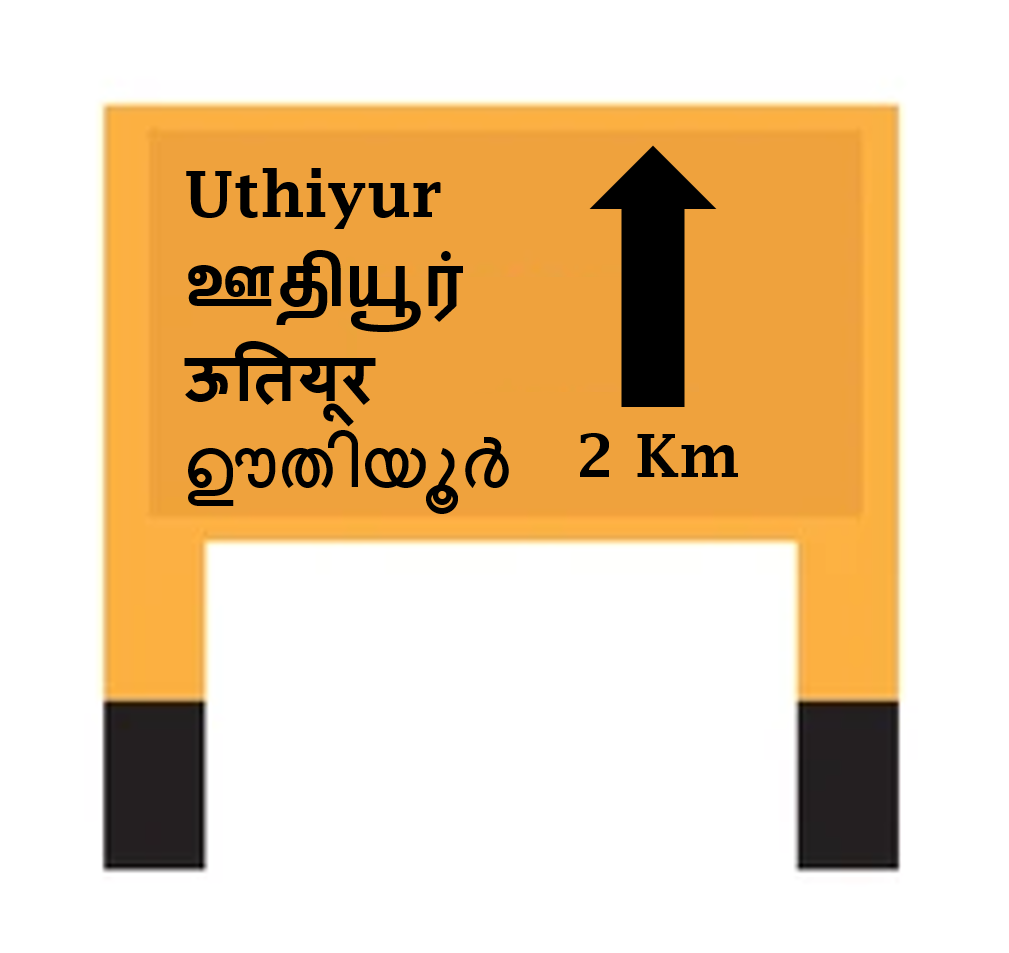
- Uthiyur Hills
- Nickname: Ponnuthi Malai
- Location within Tamil Nadu
- Coordinates: 10°53′55″N 77°31′41″E
- Country: India
- State: Tamil Nadu
- Region: Kongu Nadu
- District: Tiruppur
- Taluk: Kangeyam
- Named for: Ponnuthi Hills, Velayudha Samy Temple, Konganar Siddhar caves

Government
  - Type: Town panchayat
- Elevation: 305 m (1,001 ft)

Population
  - Total: 3,500

Languages
  - Official: Tamil, English
- Time zone: UTC+5.30 (Indian Standard Time)
- Postal Code: 638703
- Area codes: 04257, 04258

Uthiyur (Ūthiyūr) is a village in Kangeyam taluk of Tiruppur district in south Indian state of Tamil Nadu.

Located in foothills of Poṉṉūthi hills, this village is known for its 9th century Uttaṇṭa Vēlāyudha Sāmy Temple and abode of Koṅgaṉa siddhar. It is one of the famous Murugan temples in Kongu Nadu which is patrionised by Arunagirinathar by Thiruppugazh. The town is located in State Highway 83A (Tamil Nadu) which connects Erode and Palani. It is 14 km away from Kangeyam, 18 km away from Dharapuram, 24 km from Vellakoil, 38 km from its district headquarter Tiruppur and 60 km from Erode.

== Etymology ==
The town got its name as it is the place where Lord Murugan arose due to the use of herbs and blow the smoke for the benefit of the people. Blowing is called 'Uuthi' in Tamil. There is an ancient hill named 'Poṉṉūthi' in this town. It is also known as Poṉṉūdhimalai and it is where great sage Konguna Siddhar stayed and made fire.

== History ==
Uthiyur was in Dharapuram Tehsil of Coimbatore district of Madras Presidency during British rule.

Uthiyur Was Part Dharapuram taluk before the formation of Kangeyam taluk.

== Geography ==
Uthiyur is located in 10°53′55"N 77°31′41"E at an average elevation of 305 m (1000 ft). The town has a semi fort by using 3 side hills as a wall and other side built with large stones as like wall.

=== Climate ===
Uthiyur lies in the Kongu upland plains and It is one of lower rainfall zones in the state, often less than 500mm annually due to the Palakkad Gap rain-shadow effect cast by the Western Ghats.

In Uthiyur, the wet season is oppressive and overcast, the dry season is humid and partly cloudy, and it is hot year round. Over the course of the year, the temperature typically varies from 70 °F (21 °C) to 98 °F (37 °C) and is rarely below 65 °F (18 °C) or above 103 °F. During the peak of the southwest monsoon (particularly around July–August, coinciding with the Tamil month of Aadi), the region experiences ferocious, sustained windst get's high velocity wind with average speed 45Km/h, highest in South asia.

=== Flora and fauna ===
The hills have rich biodiversity of Plants and Animals including Foxes, Monkeys, Pigs, Deer, Wild boar, Wild Dogs, Cows and lots of other Reptile. The hills is under control of Anamalai Tiger Reserves.

== Demographics ==
This region had a population of 3500 people according to 2011 Census of India. In 2011, literacy rate of Uthiyur village was 68.63% compared to 80.09% of Tamil Nadu. In Uthiyur Male literacy stands at 78.20% while female literacy rate was 59.15%. Average Sex Ratio of Uthiyur village is 1006 which is higher than Tamil Nadu state average of 996. Child Sex Ratio for the Uthiyur as per census is 969, higher than Tamil Nadu average of 943.

Hinduism is the predominant religion in this region. Tamil is the official language of the grama panchayat along with English. The dialect of Tamil spoken here is Kongu Tamil.

== Politics ==
This small town belongs to Kangayam state assembly constituency and Erode Lok Sabha constituency.

== Economy ==
Agriculture, Pastoral farming, Business is predominant economy here. It is small economic hub with presence of many Manufacturing, Mining, Textile, Coir, Jute, Dairy industries, Electric power stations and many other units around this region providing jobs for people in this region as well attract North Indians labours. The town also houses Hatsun Agro Plant in Kundadam road.

Hatsun Agro plant is working in land belonging to Velayudha samy temple.

There is an ATM and Canara Bank functioning in Uthiyur.

== Landmarks ==
There are many temples across the wide Uthiyur hills maintained by Hindu Religious and Charitable Endowments Department of Government of Tamil Nadu. Few important ones are Uthanda Velayudhasamy Temple, Chetti Thambiran Temple and Uchi Pilayar Temple. There are electricity, drinking water and roads with bilingual sign boards facilities for temples in the hills.

Located here is the shrine of Lord Murugan, the holy place where classical Tamil poet Arunagirinathar sung Thiruppugazh(106). Ancient symbols and sculptures are found on this hill depicting the culture of the Hindus and Tamils.

=== Uthanda Velayudha Samy Temple ===
Uthanda Velayudasamy Temple is the main shrine in the town built in dravidian architecture dedicated to Lord Murugan in hills. It attracts thousands of visitors across the district. It has lots of ancient scriptures in Tamil found by archaeologists dating to 9th century CE. It is located in flight of 100 steps from the ground.

=== Uchi Pillayar Temple ===
This is a hill top temple dedicated for Lord Ganesh. There is only two-wheeler road. It has electricity, light and water facilities. It is located at 1080m above sea level.

=== Kongana Sidhar Caves ===
The hills is said to be place where great sage Koṅgaṉa siddhar lived. Here exists his Jeeva Samathi and meditating rocks.

=== Sri Prakalanayaki Sameta Kailāsanāthar Temple ===
This temple is located near the town

== Festivals ==
There are many festivals celebrated in this temple like Kruthika, star days of every month, Thaipusam, Chitra Pournami, Amavasya, Thalai Aadi, Vaikasi Brahmotsavam, Vaikasi Visakam, and all the Fridays are special in this temple. Deepavali, Navaratri, Panguni Uthiram, and Karthika Deepam are also the grand festivals of this Uthiyur Velayudhaswamy Murugan Temple.

Amavasya and Pournami hold religious significance at the site, attracting devotees from across Tamil Nadu and other states.

== Transportation ==
Uthiyur is located in State Highway 83A (Tamil Nadu) which serves as link road between cities like Erode, Salem, Bangalore, Kangeyam to Palani and Dharapuram. Buses run 24/7 via the four-lane road. It also serves as link between Kundadam and Vellakoil.

Nearby cities include Dharapuram, Palladam, Palani, Tiruppur, Erode, Oddanchatram, Coimbatore, Kodaikanal, Karur, Dindigul and Salem.

Buses are available for every 5 minutes to Dharapuram, Palani, Erode and Salem. As well town buses are operated to nearby localities including Kangeyam, Lakkamanaickenpatti, Kundadam, Vellakoil, Koduvai, Avinashipalayam, Pongalur, Tiruppur and Palladam. Nearest Railway Station is Tiruppur railway station which is 40 km and Palani railway station which is 50 km. Nearest airports are Coimbatore International Airport and Salem Airport.

== Education ==
There are government, govt-funded and private schools up to higher secondary level in and around Uthiyur. Some schools include:

- Shanti Niketan higher secondary school, KKS Nagar, Kullam Palayam, Uthiyur 638703
- VMCDV Government-aided higher secondary school, Thayam Palayam.
- Government mid school, Mudhali Palayam, Uthiyur 638703
- Sri Nandhana Vidhyalaya matriculation school

== Healthcare and facilities ==
There are also government and Private health centres, Clinics and hospitals in this region. HealthCentres include:

- Kullam Palayam Primary Health Centre, Uthiyur 638703
- Thayam Palayam Govt hospital, Uthiyur 638703

There is a police station in Uthiyur serving its nearby localities. Uthiyur is a Firkah in Kangeyam taluk in Tiruppur district. Uthiyur houses head post office of the region.
