= Kundadam =

Town in Tamil Nadu, India

- Historical town
- Kundadam
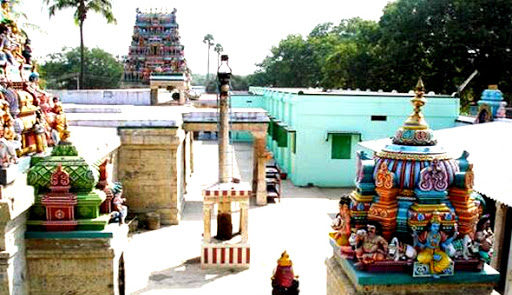
- Kundadam KalaBhairavar Temple
- Nicknames: Kundrai, Kundrapuram, Kundrai Managar, Kundridam
- Location in Tamil Nadu, India
- Coordinates: 10.8501°N 77.4458°E
- Country: India
- State: Tamil Nadu
- Region: Kongu Nadu
- District: Tiruppur
- Taluk: Dharapuram

Government
  - Type: Town Panchayat
  - Body: Kundadam block
- Elevation: 305 m (1,001 ft)

Population (2011)
  - Total: 71,781

Languages
  - Official: Tamil, English
- Time zone: UTC+5:30 (IST)
- PIN: 638702
- STD Code: 04258
- Vehicle registration: TN 78
- Website: tiruppur.nic.in/directory/kundadam/

Kundadam is a small town located in Dharapuram taluk of Tiruppur district in Indian state of Tamil Nadu. It is the headquarters of the Kundadam Panchayat Union in Tiruppur district. It is located 16 km away from Dharapuram in Coimbatore-Dharapuram highway. In the classical Tamil texts, this town is named as Kundrai, Kundrapuram, Kundrai Managar and Kundridam. The town houses famous temples including Varatharājaperumāl Temple, Kala Bairavar Temple, Kongu Vatuganādha Swāmy Temple, Koṅgar Chinnamman Temple and Vadivudaimangai Udanurai Konguvidangkisuvarar Temple.

== Economy ==
Kundadam's economy is based on agriculture. Coconut is a major part of cultivation in Kundadam. Kundadam is also a large supplier of onions to nearby districts. Being proximate to Tiruppur, Kundadam also houses some textile based industries.

== Administration and politics ==
Kundadam was a part of Coimbatore district and later Erode district and now Tiruppur district. Kundadam comes under Dharapuram taluk, Tiruppur district and headquarters of Kundadam block. It falls under Dharapuram state assembly constituency and Erode Lok Sabha constituency.

AIADMK, DMK and BJP are the major political parties in this area.

This town also houses a police station. Kundadam also has a cattle market.

== Connectivity ==
Nearby Bus terminal is Dharapuram city bus terminal. There are buses available 24/7 to Coimbatore, Dharapuram, Palladam, Tiruppur, Madurai, Oddanchatram, and Dindigul. It is also connected to nearby towns like Kangeyam, Uthiyur, SuriyaNallur, Koduvai and AvinashiPalayam via town buses. Nearby Railway station is Tiruppur railway station and nearby airport is Coimbatore International Airport.

== See also ==
- Dharapuram
- Tiruppur
- Uthiyur
