= Arachalur Musical Inscription =

Historical Site

Arachalur Rock-cut Musical Inscription
- Location within Tamil Nadu

Religion
- Affiliation: Hinduism, Jainism

Location
- Location: Nagamalai, Arachalur, Erode, Tamil Nadu, India
- Coordinates: 11°10′23″N 77°42′00″E

Architecture
- Completed: 2nd century AD

Arachalur Rock-cut Cave Musical Inscription, also known as Arachalur Isai Kalvettu, is a rock cut historical site of musical inscriptions at the south of Nagamalai hill in Arachalur Reserve Forest near Erode in Tamil Nadu, India.

== The Inscriptions ==
There are three 2nd century CE Jain inscriptions in Arachalur, which Dr. S. Raju discovered. On a Jain bed in the Arachalur hills, is an inscription — ‘ezhuthum punaruthan maniya vannakkan devan sathan.’ The word ‘punaruthan’ is an alteration of punarthan, which means organised. The other two inscriptions have musical syllables, which are the same when read from left to right, and vice versa; they are also the same when read from the top of a column to the bottom and vice versa. These two inscriptions show that 'Maniyan Vannakkan Devan Sathan' organised musical syllables. "This inscription, which belongs to the same period as Silappadikaram, is centuries older than the 'Kudumiyamalai inscriptions' on music, and yet the Arachalur inscription hardly draws visitors," rues Dr.S. Raju.

== Location ==
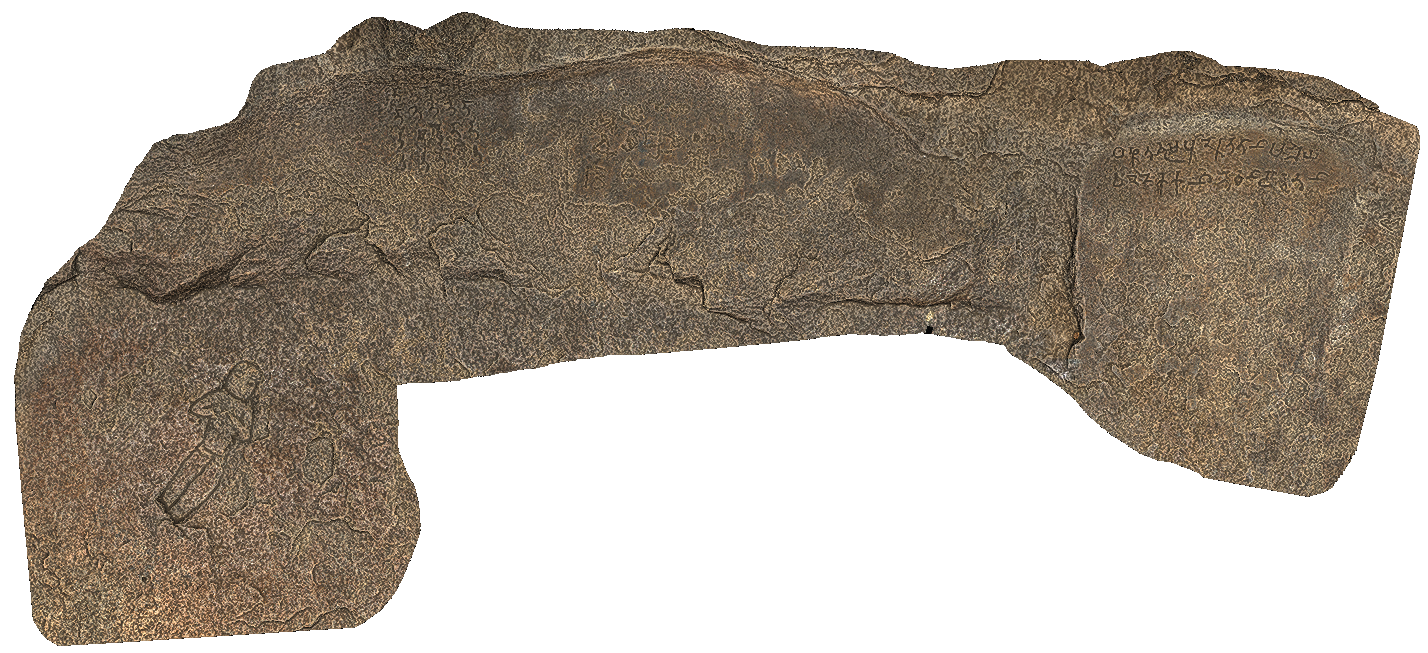
Digital images obtained by 3D scanning of the three 3-4th century Tamil-Brahmi inscriptions at Arachalur

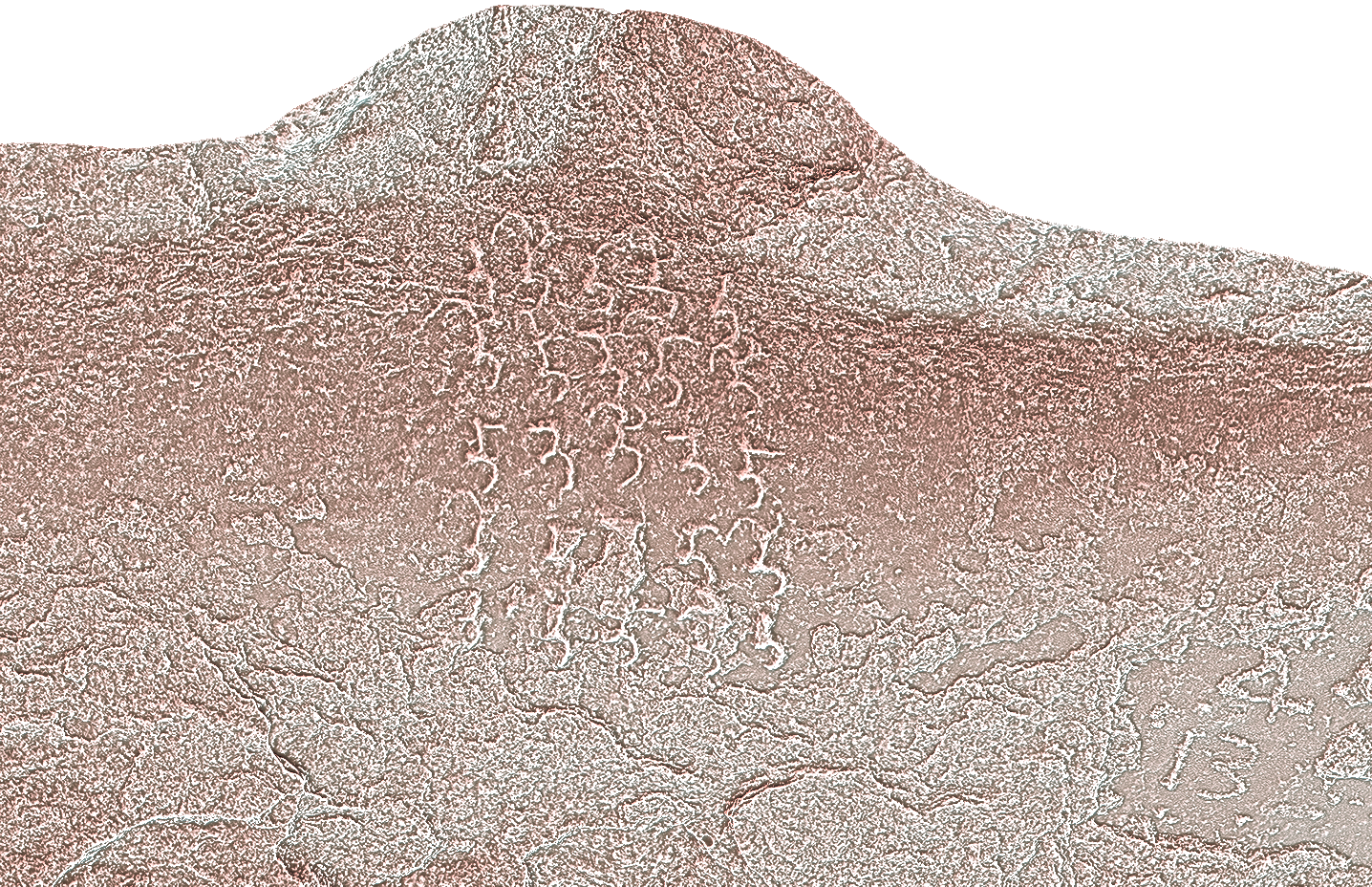
Digital image obtained by 3D scanning of the 3-4th century Tamil-Brahmi "musical" inscription

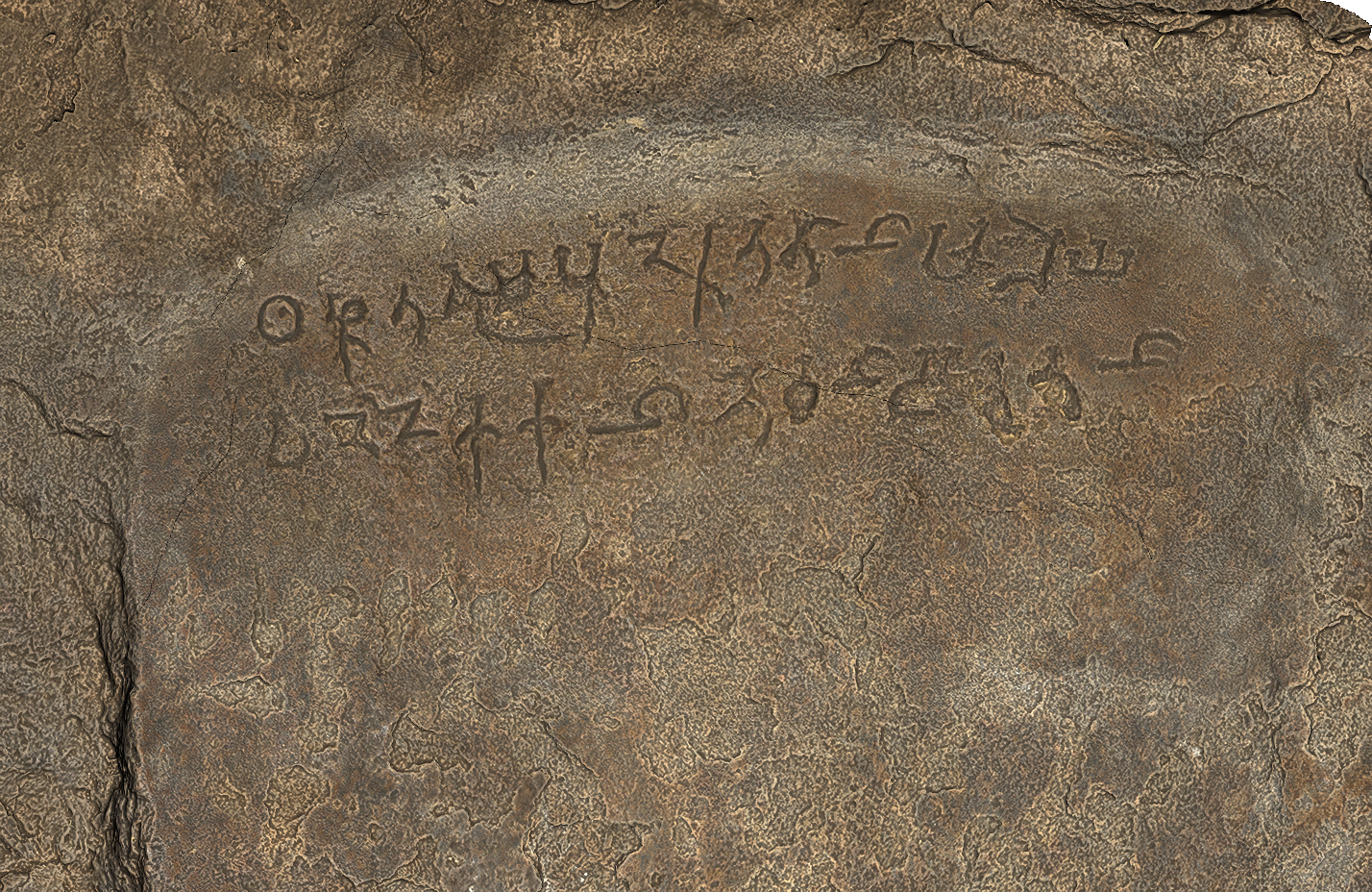
Digital image obtained by 3D scanning of the 3-4th century Tamil-Brahmi Arachalur Tevan Cattan inscription

The site is located on the Erode-Palani State Highway-83A about 20 km from Erode Central Bus Terminus and 18 km from Erode Junction railway station.
