= Mangalapatti =

- Village
- Location in Tamil Nadu, India
- Coordinates: 11.006315°N 77.755098°E
- Country: India
- State: Tamil Nadu
- District: Tirupur

Population (2011)
  - Total: 3,512

Languages
  - Official: Tamil
- Time zone: UTC+5:30 (IST)
- PIN: 638 105
- Telephone code: 91 4257
- Vehicle registration: TN 42, TN 56

Mangalapatti is a village located in Kangeyam taluk of Tiruppur district, Tamil Nadu, India.

== Demographics ==
Mangalapatti has population of 3,512 of which 1,734 are males while 1,778 are females as per report released by Census India 2011. The population of children aged 0-6 is 294 which is 8.37% of total population of Mangalapatti. In Mangalapatti, female sex ratio is 1025 against state average of 996. Moreover, the child sex ratio in Mangalapatti is around 1100 compared to Tamil Nadu state average of 943. The literacy rate of Mangalapatti is 67.65% lower than state average of 80.09%. male literacy is around 76.85% while the female literacy rate is 58.62%.

== Schools ==
- Government High School, Mangalappatti

== Temples ==
- Kaaliamman Temple
- Eswaran Temple
- Pattatharasi Amman Temple
