= Tiruppur Kumaran =

Indian revolutionary (1904–1932)

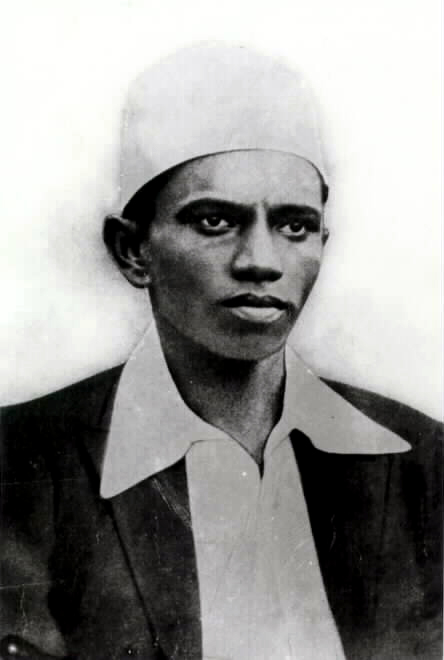
- Tiruppur Kumaran
- Born: 4 October 1904; Chennimalai, Coimbatore District, Madras Presidency, British India (present day Erode district, Tamil Nadu, India)
- Died: 11 January 1932 (aged 27); Tiruppur, Coimbatore District, Madras Presidency, British India
- Cause of death: Police brutality during march

Tiruppur Kumaran also known as Kodi Kaatha Kumaran (4 October 1904 – 11 January 1932) was an Indian revolutionary and freedom fighter who participated in the Indian independence movement. He was inspired by Mahatma Gandhi. He died from injuries sustained from a police assault during a protest march against the British Raj, and was holding the flag of the Indian nationalists at the time of his death.

== Biography ==
Kumaran was born as Kumaraswamy Mudaliyar in Chennimalai in Madras Presidency, British India (present-day Erode district in Tamil Nadu). His parents were Nachimuthu Mudaliyar and Karuppaayi Amma. He founded the Desa Bandhu Youth Association and led protests against the British. He died from injuries sustained from a police assault on the banks of Noyyal River in Tiruppur during a protest march against the British government on 11 January 1932. At the time of his death, he was holding the flag of the Indian nationalists, which had been banned by the British giving rise to the epithet Kodi Kaatha Kumaran in Tamil which means "Kumaran who protected the flag".

== Honours ==
A commemorative stamp was issued by India Post in October 2004 on his 100th birth anniversary. A statue has been erected in Tirupur in his honour which is often used as a focal point for public demonstrations.
