= National Highway 381A (India) =

National highway in India

National Highway 381A
- Map of National Highway 381A in red

Route information
- Auxiliary route of NH 81
- Length: 72 km (45 mi)

Major junctions
- South end: Vellakoil, Tamil Nadu
- North end: Sankagiri

Location
- Country: India
- States: Tamil Nadu: 72 km (45 mi)
- Primary destinations: Erode

Highway system
- Roads in India; Expressways; National; State; Asian
← NH 81	→ NH 544

National Highway 381A, commonly referred to as NH 381A, is an inter-corridor highway connecting NH-81 near Vellakoil with NH-544 near Sankagiri through the city of Erode in South India.

== Route ==
Highway Number	Source	Destination	Via	Length (km)
381A	Vellakoil	Sankagiri	Erode	72

The highway starts from NH 81 in Vellakoil and passes through Muthur, Vilakkethi (Sivagiri), Modakkurichi, Erode, Pallipalayam and terminates at NH 544 near Sankagiri.

== Junctions ==
NH 81 Terminal near Vellakoil.
NH 544H near Panneerselvam Park in Erode.
NH 544 Terminal near Sankagiri.

== See also ==
- List of national highways in India
- List of national highways in India by state
