= National Highway 136 (India) =

National highway in India

National Highway 136
- Map of National Highway 136 in red

Route information
- Auxiliary route of NH 36
- Length: 140 km (87 mi)

Major junctions
- South end: Thanjavur
- North end: Attur

Location
- Country: India
- States: Tamil Nadu
- Primary destinations: Perambalur

Highway system
- Roads in India; Expressways; National; State; Asian
← NH 36	→ NH 79

National Highway 136, commonly referred to as NH 136, is a national highway of India. It comes under Ministry of Road Transport and Highways, Government of India. It is a secondary route of National Highway 36. NH-136 traverses the state of Tamil Nadu in India.

== Route ==
Thanjavur, Thiruvaiyaru, Ariyalur,Perambalur, Veeraganur, Attur.

== Junctions ==
NH 36 Terminal near Thanjavur.
NH 81 near Keezhapalur.
NH 38 near Perambalur.
NH 79 Terminal near Attur.

== See also ==
- List of national highways in India
- List of national highways in India by state
