= Umblachery =

Breed of cattle

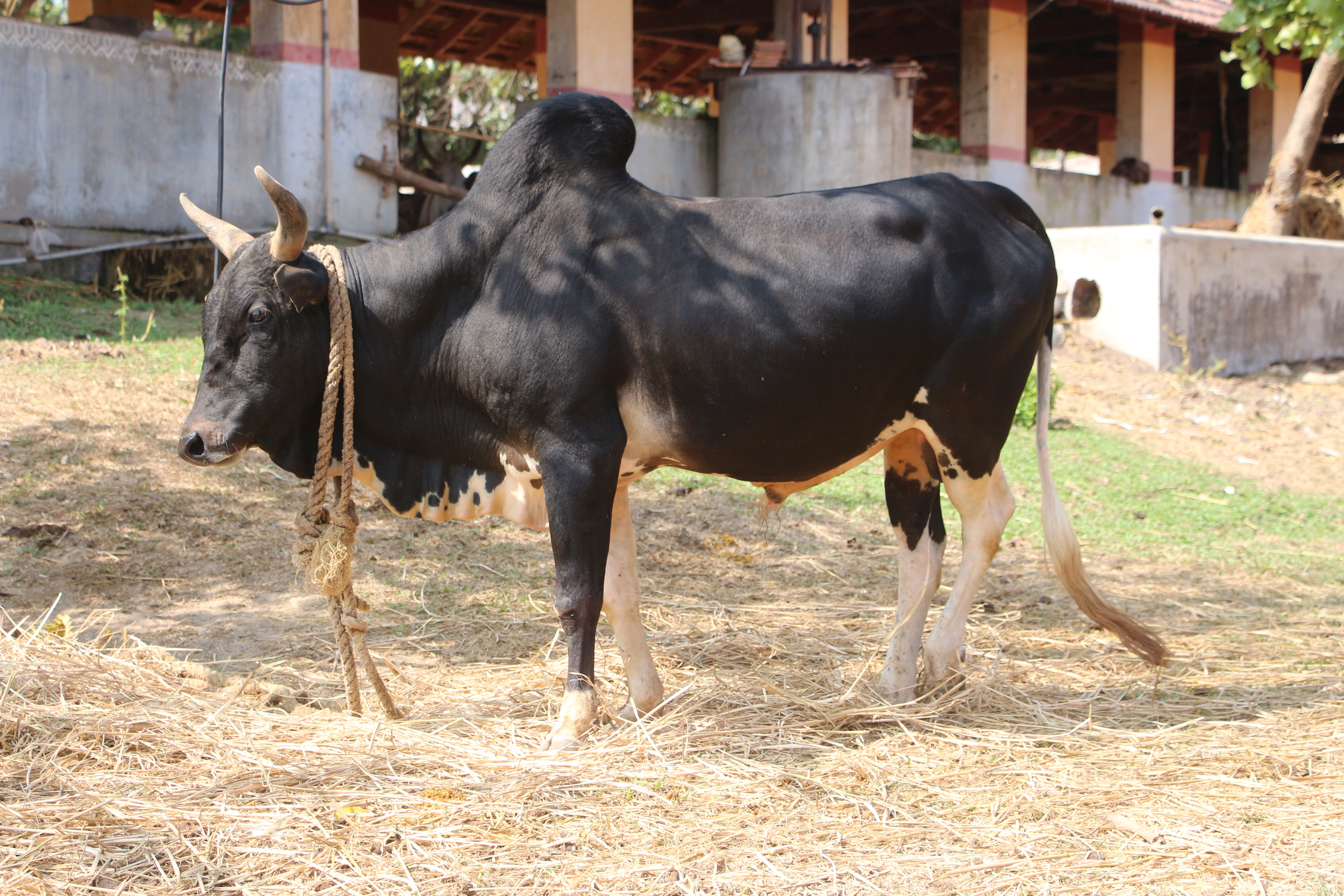
- Bull

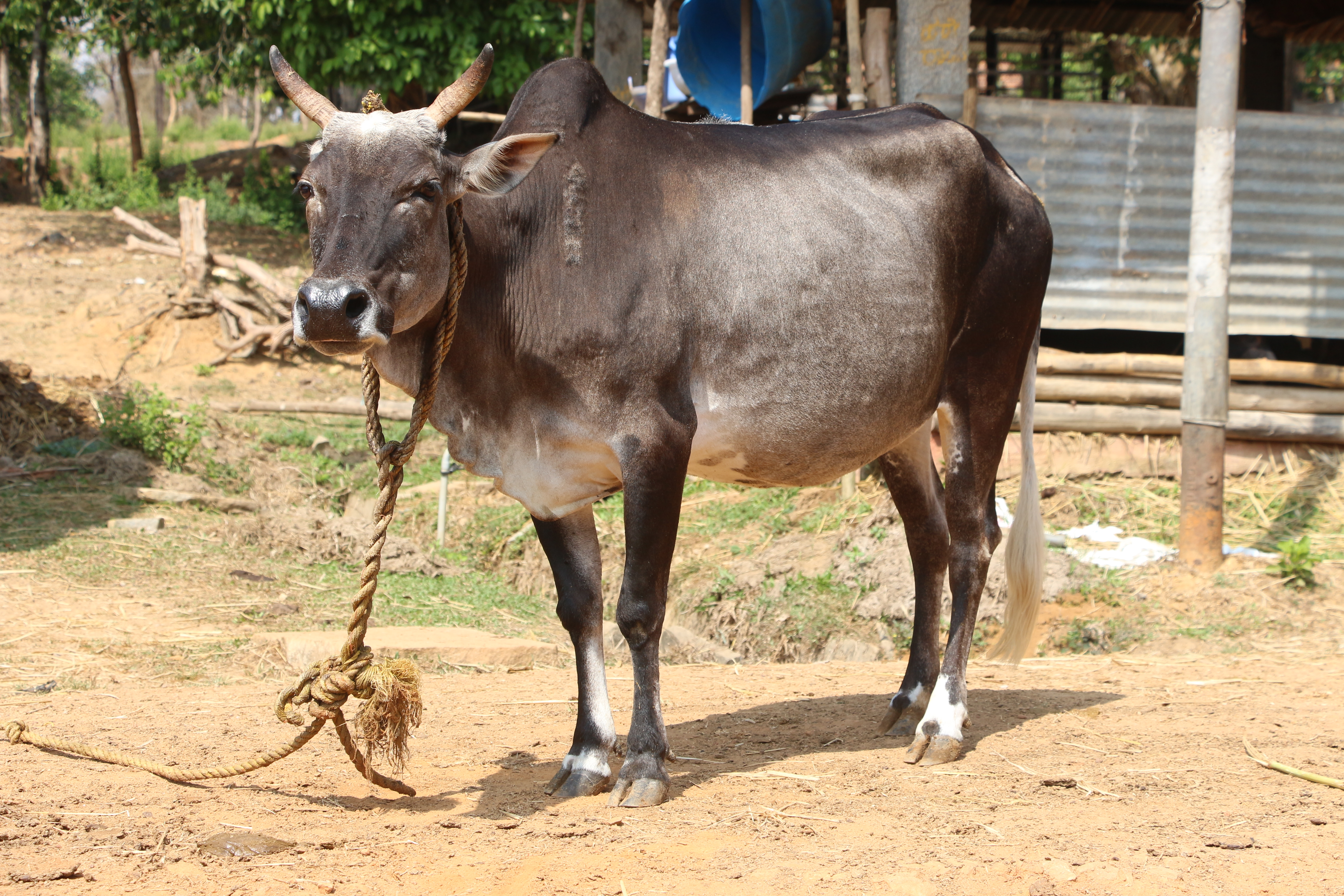
- Cow
- Conservation status: FAO (2007): endangered; DAD-IS (2020): not at risk
- Country of origin: India
- Distribution: Tamil Nadu

Traits
- Weight: Male: 385 kg; Female: 325 kg
- Height: Male: 113 cm; Female: 103 cm
- Coat: grey, bulls darker than cows
- Horn status: small horns in both sexes

The Umblachery is an Indian breed of zebuine cattle. It is distributed in the coastal plains of the districts of Nagapattinam, Tiruvarur and Thanjavur in the state of Tamil Nadu in South India. It was bred for draught work, particularly in the rice paddies of the area.

== History ==
The Umblachery of eastern and central Tamil Nadu is thought to have derived from cross-breeding of local cattle with animals of the Kangayam cattle breed of the same state. It is distributed in the coastal plains of the districts of Nagapattinam, Tiruvarur and Thanjavur. A census in 2000 found 283157 head. In 2007 its conservation status was reported by the FAO as "endangered". In 2013 the breed population was reported to be between 39000 and 72000; in 2020 the conservation status reported to DAD-IS was "not at risk".

== Characteristics ==
The Umblachery is a small breed, standing just over a metre at the withers. Cows are grey, with darker markings on the face and neck and on the hindquarters; bulls are darker, and may have white markings such as white socks or a white star on the face. The horns are small in both sexes. Calves are born a reddish colour, which changes to grey within the first year of life.

== Use ==
The Umblachery was bred for draught work, particularly in the rice paddies of the area. It may also be milked: the milk has a fat content of about 4.9%; the annual yield is approximately 400 kg.
