= Avinashipalayam =

Avināshipāḷayam
- Town
- AvinashiPalayam
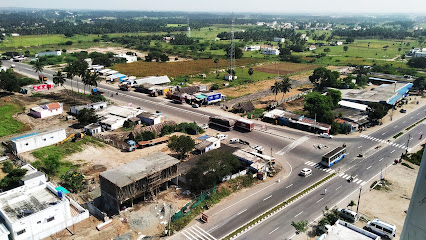

- Location within Tamil Nadu
- Coordinates: 10°58′13″N 77°25′37″E
- Country: India
- State: Tamil Nadu
- Region: Kongu Nadu
- District: Tiruppur
- Named for: Amman temples

Government
  - Type: Town panchayat
- Elevation: 297 m (974 ft)

Languages
  - Official: Tamil, English
- Time zone: UTC+5.30 (Indian Standard Time)
- Postal Code: 638660
- Area code: 0421

Avinashipalayam (Avināsipāḷaiyam) is a small town in Tiruppur District in Tamil Nadu, India. It comes under Pongalur block and Tiruppur South taluk.

== Geography ==
Avinashipalayam is located 7 km from Pongalur, 18 km from Palladam, 19 km from Kangeyam, 22 km away from Tiruppur and 32 km from Dharapuram.

== Transport ==
The town is located along the junction of the National Highway 81 connecting Coimbatore and Tiruchirapalli and Tamilnadu State Highway-37, which connects Madurai and Tiruppur.

== Major religious spots ==
- Bhagavathyamman Temple
- Chellandiamman Temple
- Mariamman Temple
