= Putharachal =

Village in Tirupur District

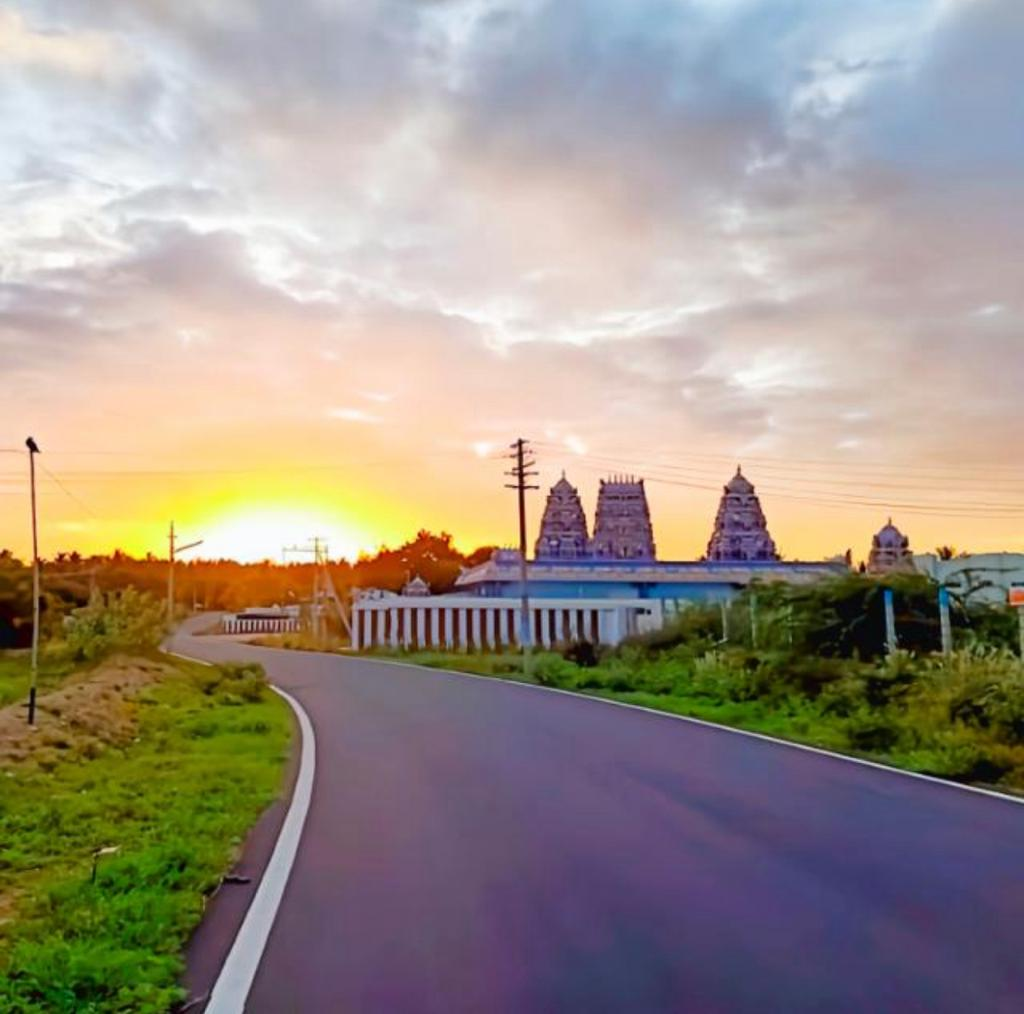

Putharachal is a village located in India, Tamil Nadu, Tirupur district. 15 km from town of Palladam. It has a population of 2000. It has regular bus transportation to all near major cities of west Tamil Nadu such as Coimbatore, Madurai, Dharapuram, Tirupur and Palladam.

== Agriculture ==
Agriculture is the main occupation here. The major crops sown are onion, corn, banana, and market vegetables such as tomato, brinjal, Okra (lady's finger), coriander. There is no river flowing through and hence only rainwater and groundwater are the source of irrigation. People also work in nearby textile mills.

== Nature ==
The village is a beautiful place and has many natural resources. A river called KambiLi (காம்பிளி ஆறு) also flows through on the southern edge of this place. It comes in Palladam - dharapuram Road. Many canals are here including small distributaries of these canals.There are many lands for cultivation. There is a man-made pond which refills occasionally due to heavy rain.

== Culture ==
=== Language ===
The languages spoken are Tamil, Telugu, Kannada, and English.

=== Religion ===
Most of the population are Hindus but some families have converted to Christianity.

=== Temple ===
Sri Akilandeswari Udanamar Soleswarar Temple is the One and Only Famous Lord Shiva Temple Around Palladam Taluk. 108 Kala Bairavar Temple is also an important among locals.

== Public services ==
There are two Mandapams (Marriage halls) in here. There is a Government Middle School for which students come from nearby villages. There are no libraries here.

In 2022, Road construction had begun and now has lavish road facilities.

== Government ==
The village predominantly falls under V. Vadamalaipalayam Village Administrative block and a minor portion falls under V Kallipalayam Village Administrative block. It also falls under Palladam constituency in state legislature.
