= National Highway 544 (India) =

National highway in South India connecting Salem and Kochi

National Highway 544
- Map of the National Highway in red
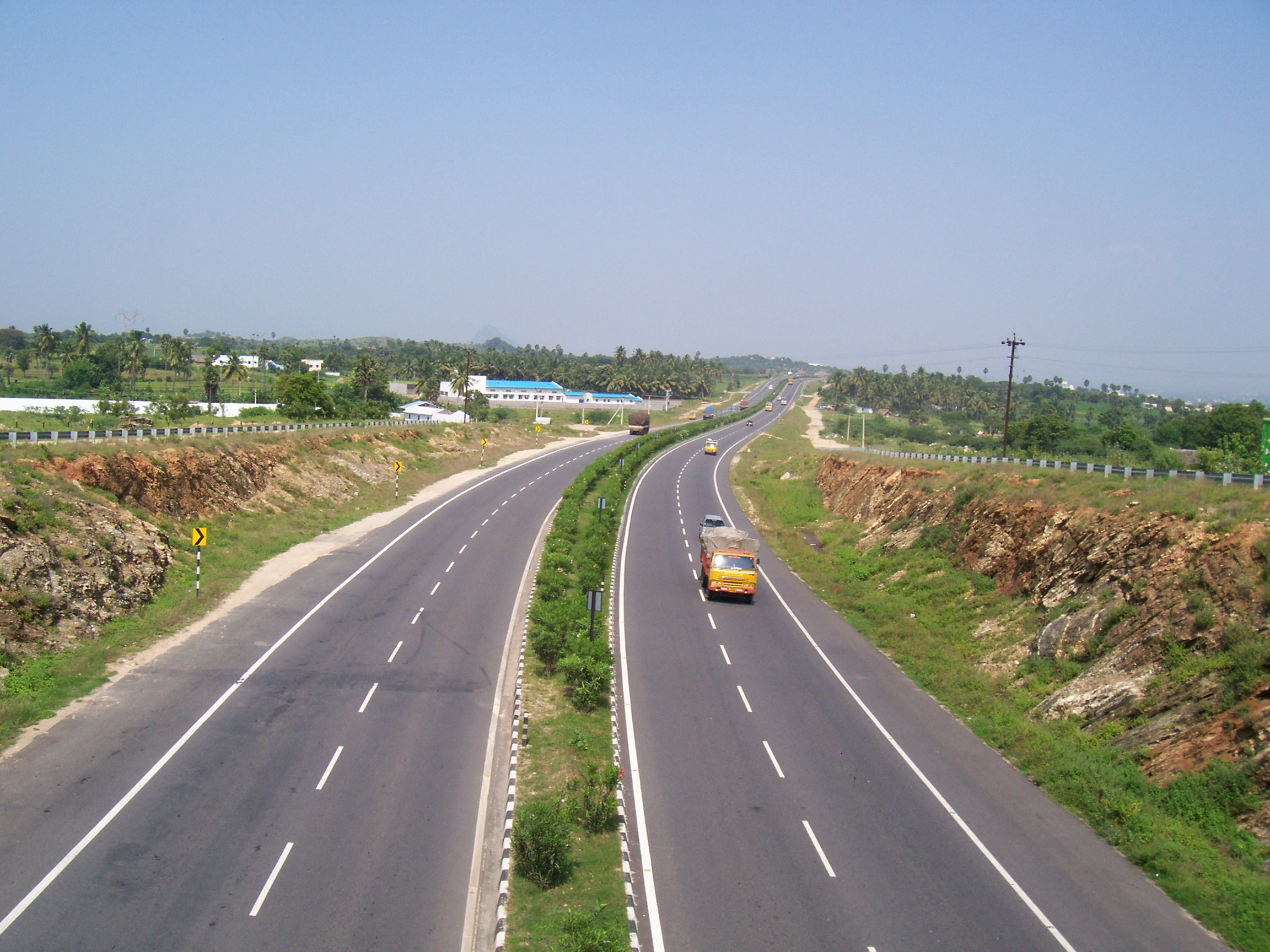
- NH 544 Expressway at Chithode near Erode, between Salem and Coimbatore

Route information
- Auxiliary route of NH 44
- Length: 340 km (210 mi)

Major junctions
- North end: NH 44 in Salem, TN
- List: NH 381A in Sankagiri, TN; NH 544H in Erode, TN; NH 381 in Avinashi, TN; NH 81 / NH 181 in Coimbatore, TN; NH 83 / NH 948 in Coimbatore, TN; NH 966 in Palakkad, KL; NH 966A in Kalamassery, KL
- South end: NH 66 in Edappally, KL

Location
- Country: India
- States: Kerala: 146 km (91 mi); Tamil Nadu: 194 km (121 mi)
- Primary destinations: Salem - Erode - Tiruppur - Coimbatore - Palakkad - Thrissur - Kochi

Highway system
- Roads in India; Expressways; National; State; Asian
← NH 44	→ NH 66

National Highway 544, commonly referred to as NH 544, is a 340-kilometre-long (210 mi) National Highway in South India connecting Salem in Tamil Nadu to Kochi in Kerala. It is a spur of National Highway 44 and forms part of the North–South corridor of the National Highway Development Project. The highway passes through the cities of Erode, Tiruppur, Coimbatore, Palakkad, and Thrissur. It was formerly designated National Highway 47.

== Route description ==
Starts from NH44 near Salem and passes through Sankagiri, Bhavani, Chithode, Erode, Perundurai, Perumaanallur, Tiruppur, Avinashi, Karumathaampatti, Coimbatore, Palakkad, Thrissur, and ends at junction with NH66 at Edapally in Kochi. Check the NH 544 videos.

== Major intersections ==
State	District	Location	km	mi	Destinations	Notes
Tamil Nadu	Salem	Salem	0	0	NH 44 - Bangalore, Namakkal, Chennai	Western end of the highway.
Tamil Nadu	Coimbatore	Neelambur	144	89	Coimbatore	Coimbatore bypass starting.
Tamil Nadu	Coimbatore	Saraswathi Hospitals	151	94	NH 181 / NH 81 - Coimbatore, Karur	
Tamil Nadu	Coimbatore	Eachanari Pirivu	164	102	NH 948 / NH 83 - Coimbatore, Pollachi	
Kerala	Palakkad	Palakkad	204	127	NH 966 - Kozhikode	
Kerala	Palakkad	Kannadi	209	130	SH 27 - Chittur	
Kerala	Thrissur	Kodakara	282	175	SH 51 - Kodungallur	
Kerala	Thrissur	Potta	288	179	SH 61 - Irinjalakkuda	
Kerala	Thrissur	Chalakkudy	291	181	SH 21 - Athirappilly	Athirapilly waterfalls
Kerala	Ernakulam	Angamaly	305	190	SH 1 - Muvattupuzha, Munnar, Kottayam	SH 1 - Angamaly to Thriuvananthapuram
Kerala	Ernakulam	Athani	312	194	Expressway to Cochin International Airport	5 km to airport.
Kerala	Ernakulam	Aluva	321	199	SH 16 - Perumbavoor, Kothamangalam, Adimali, Munnar	Aluva-Munnar Road.
Kerala	Ernakulam	Kalamassery	325	202	NH 966A - International Container Transshipment Terminal, Kochi	International Container Terminal Road
Kerala	Ernakulam	Edapally	328	204	NH 66 - Thiruvananthapuram, Kanyakumari, Kozhikode	Kanyakumari-Panvel Highway
1.000 mi = 1.609 km; 1.000 km = 0.621 mi

== Toll Plazas ==
- Vaiguntham, Tamil Nadu
- Vijaymangalmam, Tamil Nadu
- Kaniyur, Tamil Nadu
- Pampampallam (Chullimada Hamlet), Kerala
- Panniyankara, Kerala
- Paliyekkara, Kerala

== Surveillance ==
In an effort to improve the traffic systems, the Kerala Road Safety Authority (KSRA) has completed the first phase of installation of high-tech automatic traffic enforcement systems on the 98 km Edappally-Mannuthy stretch of NH 544. As part of the Rs 8.5 crore project, 65 automatic traffic enforcement systems will be installed at 23 points on the stretch. The monitoring technology involves a mixture of virtual sensors, motion detectors, inductive sensors, logo sensors and high resolution cameras. Pictures of number plates would be captured using 10 megapixel cameras. The main server that will be linked to all cameras will be set up at the deputy transport commissioner's office. The magnetic sensors installed on roads will trigger the cameras in case of violations and send a message to the main server. Offenders will be traced based on visuals of vehicles and registration plates and they will be issued notice. The project is being implemented by KSRA and the Motor Vehicles Department with the technical support of Keltron as part of the decision to observe 2011-2020 as the 'decade of action for road safety'.

== See also ==
- National Highways Development Project
- Coimbatore-Salem Industrial Corridor
