= Muthur =

- Town

- Location in Tamil Nadu, India
- Coordinates: 11.04°N 77.73°E
- Country: India
- State: Tamil Nadu
- District: Tiruppur
- Taluk: Kangeyam

Area
  - Total: 32.7 km^{2} (12.6 sq mi)

Population (2025)
  - Total: 19,100
  - Density: 584/km^{2} (1,510/sq mi)

Languages
  - Official: Tamil
- Time zone: UTC+5:30 (IST)

Muthur is a panchayat town in Kangeyam taluk of Tiruppur district in the Indian state of Tamil Nadu. It is one of the 15 panchayat towns in the district. Spread across an area of 32.7 km^{2} (12.6 sq mi), it had a population of 13,212 individuals as per the 2011 census.

== Geography and administration ==
Muthur is located in Kangeyam taluk of Tiruppur district in the state of Tamil Nadu. Spread across an area of 12.6 km^{2} (4.9 sq mi), it is one of the 15 panchayat towns in the district. The town panchayat is sub-divided into 15 wards and incorporates about 28 habitations across the three revenue villages of Muthur, Chinnamuthur, and Udaiyam. The town panchayat is headed by a chairperson, who is elected by the members, who are chosen through direct elections. The town forms part of the Kangayam Assembly constituency that elects its member to the Tamil Nadu legislative assembly and the Erode Lok Sabha constituency that elects its member to the Parliament of India.

== Demographics ==
As per the 2011 census, Muthur had a population of 13,212 individuals across 3,948 households. The population saw a marginal increase compared to the previous census in 2001 when 11,880 inhabitants were registered. The population consisted of 6,588 males and 6,624 females. About 1,003 individuals were below the age of six years. About 29.3% of the population belonged to scheduled castes. The entire population is classified as urban. The town has an average literacy rate of 70.6%.

About 57.4% of the eligible population were employed, of which majority were involved in agriculture and allied activities. Hinduism was the majority religion which was followed by 98.7% of the population, with Christianity (0.9%) and Islam (0.3%) being minor religions.
