= Chennimalai block =

Revenue block in Tamil Nadu, India

Coordinates: 11.1651°N 77.6024°E

Chennimalai block is a revenue block in the Erode district of Tamil Nadu, India. It has a total of 22 panchayat villages.
