= Uthiyur Hills =

Mountain in Tiruppur district, Tamil Nadu, India

Ūthiyūr Hills
- Poṉṉūthi Hills
- Location within Tamil Nadu

Highest point
- Elevation: 310 m (1,020 ft)
- Coordinates: 10.8903°N 77.5132°E

Naming
- Etymology: ūthi
- Nickname(s): Uuthi Malai, Uuthigiri, Ponnuthi mamalai
- Language of name: Tamil

Geography
- Location: Tamil Nadu, India
- State: Tamil Nadu
- District: Tiruppur
- Parent range: Uthiyur Hills Range

Uthiyur Hills (also referred to as Poṉṉūthi Hills, Uuthi Malai, or Uthigiri) is a hill range located in Kangeyam taluk of the Kongu Region, Tamil Nadu. The hills is under control of Anamalai Tiger Reserves.

The hills got its name as it is the place where Lord Murugan arose due to the use of herbs and blow the smoke for the benefit of the people. Uuthi in Tamil means Blowing. It is commonly known as Poṉṉūdhimalai in Tamil.

Located here is the shrine of Lord Murugan, the holy place where classical Tamil poet Arunagirinathar sung Thiruppugazh(106). This hills is also home to Thavapeedam of Kongana Siddhar, one of the 18 great Siddhars. Ancient symbols and sculptures are found on this hill depicting the culture of the Hindus and Tamils. Various archeological sculptures around the hill bear historical pride. The speciality of this pilgrimage is the clay pipes which Konguna siddhar used to make gold still exists here.

== Mythology ==
The famous mythology about the Uthiyur hills is based on Hindu epic Ramayana. During the great Ramayana war between Rama and Ravana in Ceylon, Rama's brother Lakshmana was struck by an arrow sent by Indrajit and he almost died. So to cure him, Jambavan asked Hanuman to get a Sanjeevani herb from the Himalayan Range between Taurus and Kailash peaks and Hanuman followed it. But he could not find the herb in the particular place on the mountain between the 2 peaks. So frustrated he felt like breaking the mountain into pieces. But he suddenly had the idea to lift the whole mountain and take it to Jambavan, and he did. When he flew the entire length of India from the Himalayas to Sri Lanka a few parts of the mountain fell in several places along the length. One of them was in Kongu region named as Poṉṉūthi malai. As soon as Hanuman left, Jambavan took the Sanjeevani herb from the hill and gave its juice to the entire battalion and saved everyone's life.

The hill, to this day, contains all the medicinal plants including Sanjeevani herb.

Due to presence of many medicinal plants it is called as Sanjeevi Hill of South.

== Temples ==
There are many temples across the wide Uthiyur hills maintained by Hindu Religious and Charitable Endowments Department of Government of Tamil Nadu. Few important ones are Uthanda Velayudhasamy Temple, Chetti Thambiran Siddhar Temple and Uchi Pilayar Temple.

Located here is the shrine of Lord Murugan, the holy place where classical Tamil poet Arunagirinathar sung Thiruppugazh(106). Ancient symbols and sculptures are found on this hill depicting the culture of the Hindus and Tamils.

=== Uthanda Velayudha Samy Temple ===
Uthanda Velayudasamy Temple is the main shrine in the town built in dravidian architecture dedicated to Lord Murugan in hills. It attracts thousands of visitors across the district. It has lots of ancient scriptures in Tamil found by archaeologists dating to 9th century CE. It is located in flight of 100 steps from the ground.

=== Chetty Thampirān Siddhar Temple ===
This is abode of Chetty Thampiraan siddhar who is known as sisya of Kongunar Sidhar.

=== Uchi Pillayar Temple ===
This is a hill top temple dedicated for Lord Ganesh. There is only two-wheeler road. It has electricity, light and water facilities. It is located at 1080m above sea level.

=== Kongana Sidhar Temple ===
The hills is said to be place where great sage Koṅgaṉa siddhar lived. Here exists his Jeeva Samathi and meditating rocks.
