= Keezhapalur =

- village
- Location in Tamil Nadu, India Keezhapalur (India)
- Coordinates: 11.047185°N 79.070463°E
- Country: India
- State: Tamil Nadu
- District: Ariyalur

Population (2001)
  - Total: 4,458

Languages
  - Official: Tamil
- Time zone: UTC+5:30 (IST)
- Vehicle registration: TN-
- Coastline: 0 kilometres (0 mi)
- Sex ratio: 960 ♂/♀
- Literacy: 70.45%

Keezhapalur is a village in the Ariyalur taluk of Ariyalur district, Tamil Nadu, India.

== Demographics ==
As of 2001 census, Keezhapalur had a total population of 4458 with 2275 males and 2183 females.
