= Vellakoil =

- 1st Grade Municipality
- Location in Tamil Nadu, India
- Coordinates: 10.93°N 77.72°E
- Country: India
- State: Tamil Nadu
- District: Tiruppur
- Taluk: Kangayam

Government
  - Type: 1st Grade Municipality (as of May 2025)
  - Body: Vellakovil Municipality
- Elevation: 231 m (758 ft)

Population (2011)
  - Total: 40,359 (<58,000 2,025)

Languages
  - Official: Tamil
- Time zone: UTC+5:30 (IST)
- PIN: 638111
- Telephone code: 04257
- Vehicle registration: TN 42y

Vellakoil is a municipal town in Kangeyam taluk of Tirupur District, in the Indian state of Tamil Nadu. It is located on National Highway 81 between Trichy and Coimbatore. The town is spread in an area of 64.75 km^{2}. As of 2011, the town had a population of 40,359. Kannapuram village located near to this town is famous for the Kangeyam breed cattle market that happens on every year during the Mariyamman temple festival in the month of April. It is an industrialized town with traditional agriculture being the occupation for most of the people. It holds lot of Power looms weaving bedsheets, floor mats and cotton materials being exported to foreign countries via exporters present in Karur.

Until 22 February 2009, this township was under district administration of Erode. Later it came under Tiruppur due to reorganizing of Coimbatore and Erode Districts into Coimbatore, Erode and Tiruppur Districts.

The town is one of the fastest growing towns of Tamil Nadu in recent years which led to its upgrade as 1st Grade Municipality.

This municipal town has a population of 58,142 with 15,120 households according to 2022 estimation and potentially exceeding 60,000 as per 2026 estimation the this municipal town has avg annual revenue exceeding 12 crore a year .

== History ==
Vellakovil Village Panchyat was established in 1938.

The panchayat town was established in 1954 and upgraded to first grade panchayat town in 1963 further upgrades to selection grade panchayat town in 1982. The municipality was established in 2004 and upgraded to second grade municipality in 2010.

== Geography ==
Vellakovil is located at 10.93°N 77.72°E. It has an average elevation of 231 m (758 ft).

== Demographics ==
Religious census
Religion	Percent(%)
Hindu	96.64%
Muslim	0.92%
Christian	2.02%
Sikh	0.03%
Buddhist	0.01%
Other	0.38%

According to 2011 census, Vellakovil had a population of 40,359 with a sex-ratio of 1,002 females for every 1,000 males, much above the national average of 929. A total of 3,438 were under the age of six, constituting 1,787 males and 1,651 females. Scheduled Castes and Scheduled Tribes accounted for 16.28% and 0.05% of the population respectively. The average literacy of the town was 74.37%, compared to the national average of 72.99%. The town had a total of 12,157 households. There were a total of 22,053 workers, comprising 577 cultivators, 1,776 main agricultural labourers, 1,077 in house hold industries, 17,098 other workers, 1,525 marginal workers, 30 marginal cultivators, 164 marginal agricultural labourers, 83 marginal workers in household industries and 1,248 other marginal workers. As per the religious census of 2011, Vellakovil had 96.64% Hindus, 0.92% Muslims, 2.02% Christians, 0.03% Sikhs, 0.01% Buddhists and 0.38% following other religions.

== Transport ==
Vellakovil is connected by roads to many major towns in the district. Vellakovil is located on National Highway 81. Another National Highway NH 381A connects Vellakovil with Erode and further connects to Salem by joining NH 544 near Sankagiri. State Highway SH 84A connects Vellakoil connects Mulanur and further connects to Oddanchathram.

Vellakovil is about 46 km South-East of Tirupur, 48 km South of Erode, 86 km East of Coimbatore, 18 km east of Kangeyam, 42 km West of Karur, 35 km north of Dharapuram.

Vellakovil Municipal town has 1 bus station and a Major stop in NH 81.

The old bus stand (potentially a minor stop for 100 years old) was identified as a stop by Collector of Coimbatore region during the British Empire but a minor road stop Connecting Coimbatore and Tiruchinopoly (Trichy) for trade routes later it was upgraded as NH 67 and now renamed as NH 81.

The old bus stand is situated in NH 81, in between Coimbatore and Trichy Megacities. All buses stop here as it's one of the major stops in NH81.

== River & irrigation ==
The Amaravathi tributary of Kaveri River from western ghats pass through the village Lakkumanayakan patti which is located 11 km north of Vellakoil.

PAP (Parambikulam Aliyar Project) and LBP (Lower Bhavani Project) channels pass through nearest village of this town and serve as main source for agriculture. But its a seasonal dam which was not constructed in center to a river so that it appears dry whole year and it was planned to store rain water for agricultural use in ~= 6000 acres agricultural area around Vellakovil Rural region .

The dam Vattamalai Karai dam (often called Vattamalai karai odai) is one of the Smaller classified & seasonal dam but still comes under WRD.

Vellakovil is surrounded by Noyyal (Tributary of Kaveri) in north which lies as border of Vellakovil & Sivagiri Blocks (as Well as Tiruppur and erode district boundaries) Likewise Amaravati, another tributary of kaveri, passes via Pudhuppai Which lies as border of Vellakovil and Mulanur block .

== Business & Industries ==
The town is a home for many small and mid scale industries like Yarn Spinning Mills, Power Looms, Textiles, Poultries, Oil Mills and Oil Refineries. Also Vellakoil is a marketing hub for Vegetables, Fruits, Grain Produces from surrounding villages.

== Constituency ==
Till the year 2010, this town was under Vellakoil state assembly constituency of Tamilnadu State and Palani parliamentary constituency of Indian Lok sabha.

After restructure of constituency by Election Commission of India, since 2011. This town comes under 102, Kangayam state assembly constituency of Tamilnadu State and Erode parliamentary constituency of Indian Lok Sabha.

The member elected from this state constituency serves as Head of Portfolio for Minister of Information and Publicity since 2021.

== Education ==
=== Colleges ===
- Vellakovil Arts & Science College (affiliated with Bharathiar University Coimbatore)
- Senathipathy Nallammai IT College
- Sri Nava college of education
- KMC College

=== Schools ===
- Arignar Anna Government Higher Secondary School
- A.N.V Vidyalaya Matriculation School
- Sathyam Montessori School, SG Valasu
- Jayam Vidya Matric. Hr. Sec. School
- Bala Matric. Hr. Sec. School
- Punitha Amala Annai Matric. Hr. Sec. School
- Kongu Vellalar Matric Higher Secondary School
- Kurinchi Matriculation school
- Barath Matriculation school, Olappalayam
- Anandha vidhyalaya Matriculation school
- Gnanasambandhar Matric hr secondary school, Pudhuppai.
- Little millennium Montessori school
- Avigna cbse school
