= National Highway 81 (India) =

National highway in India

National Highway 81
- Map of the National Highway in red

Route information
- Length: 321.4 km (199.7 mi)

Major junctions
- West end: NH 181 / NH 544 in Coimbatore
- List: NH 381 in Avinashipalayam; NH 381A in Vellakovil; NH 44 in Karur; NH 38 in Tiruchirappalli; NH 136 in Keezhapalur; NH 36 in Gangaikonda Cholapuram
- East end: NH 32 in Chidambaram

Location
- Country: India
- States: Tamil Nadu: 321.4 km (199.7 mi)
- Primary destinations: Kangeyam, Karur, Kulithalai, Tiruchirappalli, Jayankondam, Kattumannar koil

Highway system
- Roads in India; Expressways; National; State; Asian
← NH 79	→ NH 83

National Highway 81, commonly referred to as NH 81, is a highway connecting the city of Coimbatore to Chidambaram in South India. This highway was previously part of old national highways 67 and 227 but subsequent to rationalisation of national highway numbers of India by Gazette notification on 5 March 2010 it was changed to National Highway 81. This national highway is 321.4 km (199.7 mi) long and runs entirely in the Indian state of Tamil Nadu.

== Route ==
Highway Number	Source	Destination	Via	Length (km)
81	Coimbatore	Chidambaram	Palladam, Kangeyam, Vellakoil, Karur, Kulithalai, Tiruchirappalli, Lalgudi, Pullampadi, Kallakudi, Keezhapalur, Jayankondam, Gangaikonda Cholapuram, Kattumannarkoil	321.4

== See also ==
- List of national highways in India
- List of national highways in India by state
