= Arachalur =

- Village
- Location in Tamil Nadu, India Arachalur (India) Arachalur (Asia)
- Coordinates: 11°8′37″N 77°40′43″E
- Country: India
- State: Tamil Nadu
- Region: Kongu Nadu
- District: Erode

Population (2001)
  - Total: 12,313

Languages
  - Official: Tamil
- Time zone: UTC+5:30 (IST)
- PIN: 638101
- Telephone code: 0424

Arachalur is a panchayat town in Erode district in the state of Tamil Nadu, India. It is situated 22 kilometres from Erode and an important junction on SH 83A en route Erode to Dharapuram and other important small towns like Kodumudi and Chennimalai.

== History ==
=== Jain Inscriptions ===
Arachalur Musical Inscription There are three 2nd century C.E. Jain inscriptions in Arachalur, which Dr. S. Raju discovered. On a Jain bed in the Arachalur hills, is an inscription — ‘ezhuthum punaruthan maniya vannakkan devan sathan.’ The word ‘punaruthan’ is an alteration of punarthan, which means organised. The other two inscriptions have musical syllables, which are the same when read from left to right, and vice versa; they are also the same when read from the top of a column to the bottom and vice versa. These two inscriptions show that 'Maniyan Vannakkan Devan Sathan' organised musical syllables. “This inscription, which belongs to the same period as Silappadikaram, is centuries older than the 'Kudumiyamalai inscriptions' on music, and yet the Arachalur inscription hardly draws visitors,” rues Dr.S. Raju.

Dr. S. Raju says that the contribution of Kongu Jains to Tamil was immense. “Konguvelir, who wrote Perunkathai, based on Durvineetha’s Brihatkatha, must have been a Kongu Vellala Jain. A Sanskrit inscription in the Vijayamangalam Jain temple, talks of the beauty of Perunkathai. This temple was built in 678 C.E. So Konguvelir must have lived in Vijayamangalam around this time.”

=== Isai Kalvettu (Music inscription) ===
In this 'Thalavumalai' small mountain, there is a music inscription, in Tamil Brahmi letters; this is the oldest kallvettu (inscription)-( Fourth Century A.D ). This Thalavumalai is presently known as Nagarajapuram.

== Demographics ==
As of 2001 India census, Arachalur had a population of 12,313. Males constitute 50% of the population and females 50%. Arachalur has an average literacy rate of 59.4%, lower than the national average of 59.5%; with 57% of the males and 43% of females literate. 8% of the population is under 6 years of age.

== Education ==
- A Government Higher Secondary School is located here,
- Navarasam Arts and Science college, is an Arts and Science college for women.
- Navarasam Academy cbse and
- Agastiya international Academy cbse .
- Rajendhiran metric higher secondary school and cbse. are also located in this town..

== Culture ==
Arachalai Amman Temple ( Padai Vettum Pathrakali ) temple was built by O. S. Duraisamy Gounder, Kottarathottam. Annual festival comes in April–May months to bring Joy and wealth to the people of this village. The festival has the famous Pookuzhi, manchal neerattu (Turmeric water Abhishek), temple car and other common ceremonies/functions.

Nagamalai Andavar Temple is located at Thalavumalai known as Nagarajapuram; present temple was built by O.S. Duraiswamy Gounder and others. This temple has historical traces of carving in a small mountain range. There is a festival which is celebrated in the month of March known as panguni uthiram . On that day, around 10,000 persons are provided with free meals.

== Transportation ==
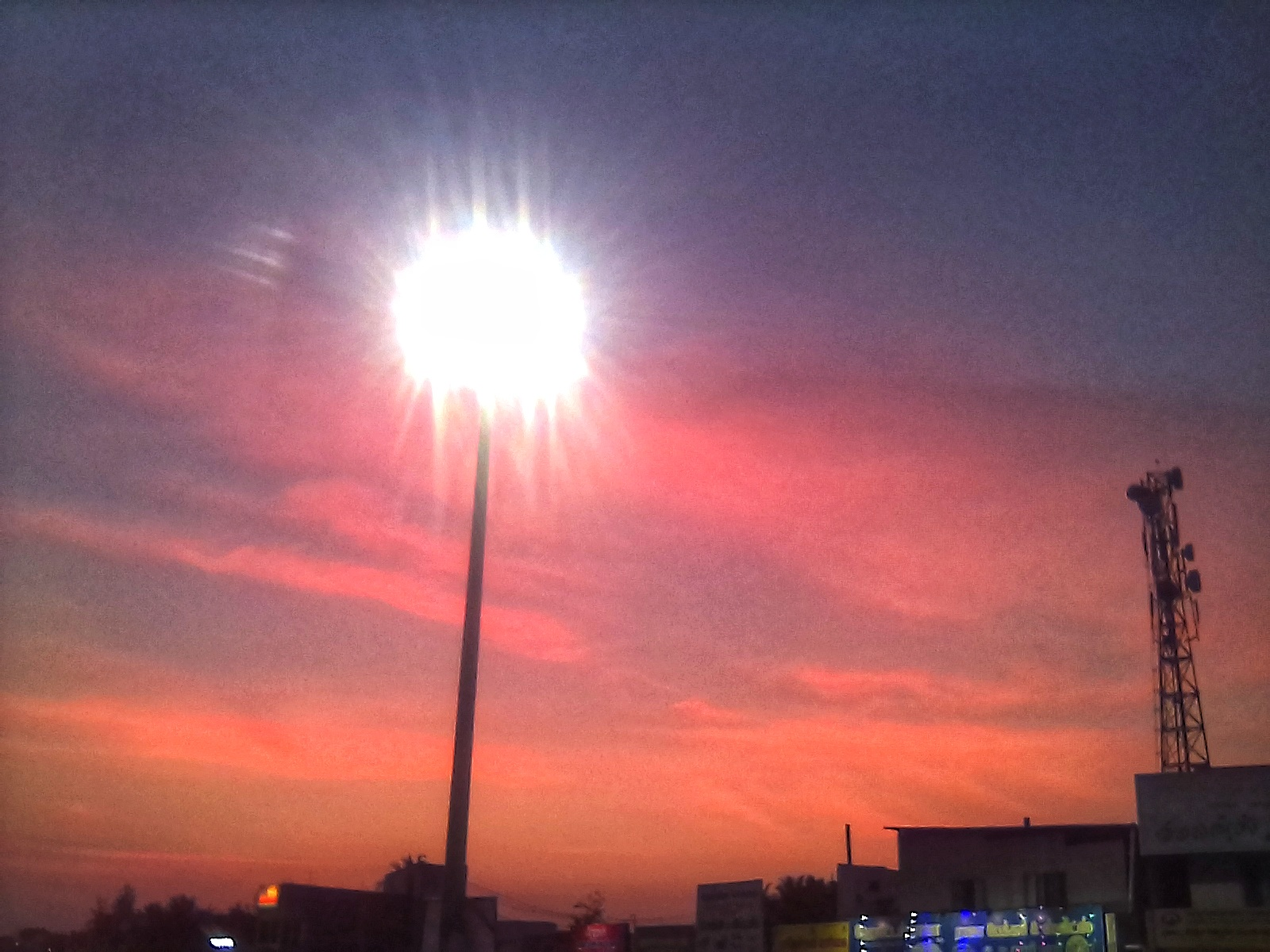
Picture taken on arachalur town panchayat bus stop - Erode District -638101

It has good bus facilities with availability of bus for every 15 minutes connecting various places like Erode, Kodumudi, Dharapuram and some other places. There are frequent buses available to Chennimalai, Tiruppur, Vellode, Avalpoondurai, Perundurai, Bhavani, Kangeyam, Palani, kodaikkanal, Karur, Salem, idaippadi, and various other towns of Tamil Nadu.The people have good relationships with each other and greet all the people gracefully..

== Festivals ==
Arachalur, located in the Erode district, is renowned for its cultural and religious heritage, primarily centered around the Arachalai Amman and Mariamman festivals. These celebrations take place annually during the Tamil month of Chithirai (April–May), serving as the town's premier community events. The festivities include the sacred Shakti Azhaippu ritual, Maavilakku offerings, and a grand Ther (chariot) procession, alongside intense devotional acts such as Kambam Naduthal, Agni Chatti (carrying fire pots), and Pookuzhi (fire walking). These events transform the town into a bustling hub of commerce and folk performances, supported by special transport links from nearby Erode and Kangeyam. In terms of infrastructure, a project to establish the town's first dedicated bus stand was initiated to manage traffic following the 2025 opening of the Solar Bus Terminal; however, physical construction has not yet started due to a stay order from the court.
