= Pongalur block =

Pongalur block is a revenue block in the Tiruppur district of Tamil Nadu, India. It has a total of 16 panchayat villages. PAP canal flows through Pongalur.
