= Palladam =

Palladam, Tiruppur district பல்லடம், திருப்பூர் மாவட்டம்
- Town & municipality
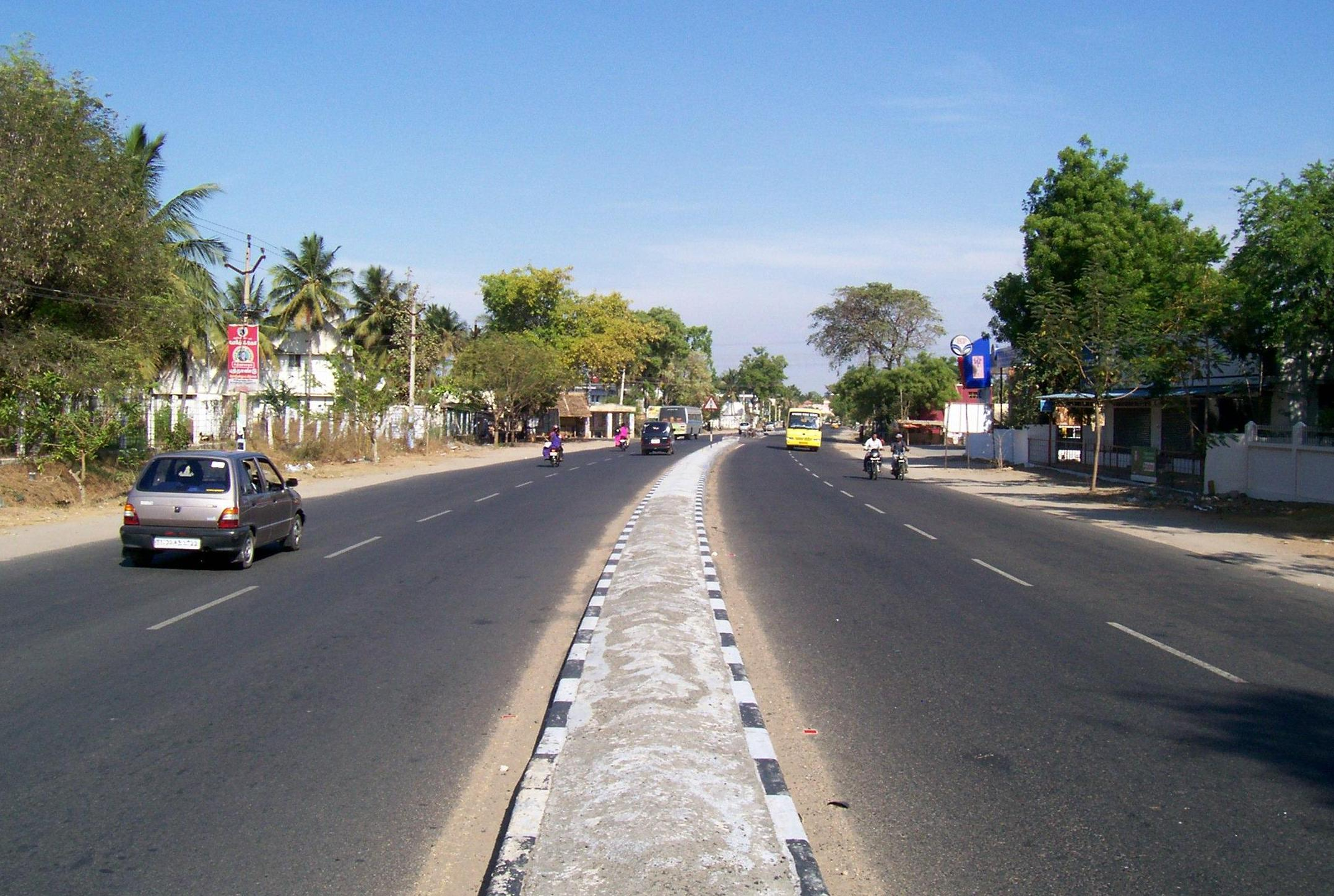
- Nickname: Poultry City
- Location in Tamil Nadu, India (Kongunadu Region) Palladam, Tiruppur district (India)
- Coordinates: 10.99°N 77.2°E
- Country: India
- State: Tamil Nadu
- Region: Kongu Nadu
- District: Tiruppur
- Metropolitan: Tiruppur
- Established: 1964

Government
  - Type: First Grade Municipality
  - Body: Palladam Municipality
  - Commissioner: Thiru.Muthuswamy.

Area
  - Total: 19.42 km^{2} (7.50 sq mi)
- Elevation: 325 m (1,066 ft)

Population (2024)
  - Total: 62,225
  - Density: 3,204/km^{2} (8,299/sq mi)
- Time zone: UTC+5:30 (IST)
- Postal code: 641664
- Telephone code: +91-04255
- Vehicle registration: TN-42
- Website: www.tnurbantree.tn.gov.in/palladam

Palladam (Tamil: பல்லடம்) is a town and First Grade Municipality in Tiruppur district in the state of Tamil Nadu, India. It is the headquarters of Palladam Taluk of Tiruppur district. Palladam is located on National Highway NH 81. Palladam is a major town with large source of income collected from the business community, which includes Textile industries, Poultry farms, and Agriculture. Palladam High-tech weaving park is a milestone of the town. It is a part of the Coimbatore MP Constituency. Palladam is well known for production of Broiler chicken production and head office of Broiler coordination committee (BCC) situated here.

== Geography ==
Palladam is located at 10.98°N 77.3°E. It has an average elevation of 325 metres (1,066 feet). Palladam is located near to Tirupur (14 km away) which is called the 'Dollar City' of Tamil Nadu, 15 km from the village of Putharachal and located 38 km east of the city of Coimbatore, ‘‘‘Manchester of South India‘‘‘ . Palladam is the gateway to Coimbatore from the eastern and south-eastern parts of Tamil Nadu. The soil is predominantly Red, suitable for cultivating vegetables and other cash crops.

== Demographics ==
According to 2011 census, Palladam had a population of 42,225 with a sex-ratio of 1,009 females for every 1,000 males, much above the national average of 929. A total of 4,742 were under the age of six, constituting 2,416 males and 2,326 females. The average literacy of the town was 74.08%, compared to the national average of 72.99%. The town had a total of 12054 households. There were a total of 18,375 workers, comprising 140 cultivators, 717 main agricultural labourers, 293 in house hold industries, 15,764 other workers, 1,461 marginal workers, 19 marginal cultivators, 165 marginal agricultural labourers, 35 marginal workers in household industries and 1,242 other marginal workers.

== Culture ==
=== Language ===
Tamil is the official language and Kongu Tamil, a dialect, is predominantly spoken. Palladam also has a significant number of North Indians who have come as labourers for employment in textile industries.

=== Religion ===
Religious census
Religion	Percent(%)
Hindu	86.77%
Muslim	7.71%
Christian	5.39%
Jain	0.01%
Other	0.09%
No religion	0.02%

As per the religious census of 2011, Palladam had 86.77% Hindus, 7.71% Muslims, 5.39% Christians, 0.01% Jains, 0.09% following other religions and 0.02% following no religion or did not indicate any religious preference.

=== Cuisine ===
Palladam cuisine is predominantly south Indian with rice as its base. famous dishes of the Kongu region is cooked still in the rural households. Green Dal, Pongalur opputtu, Arisiyum Paruppu (Dal Rice) is an ubiquitous dish savoured by many. Most local restaurants still retain their rural flavour, with many restaurants serving food over a banana leaf.

== Transport and communication ==
Palladam is well-connected with Tirupur & Coimbatore city and other neighbouring suburbs through roads. It lies on the routes of Chidambaram - Trichy - Coimbatore National Highway 81. Sulur is also close to Palladam. The nearest airport is Coimbatore International Airport about 35 km south of the city from Palladam via Sulur & L&T bypass Road. There is no Rail or Air transport to the town. The nearest Railway Station is at Tirupur, about 16 km away from Palladam. From Palladam to Madurai (via Dharapuram), frequent buses are available. A good transport is connected between Palladam and Pollachi through Palladam-Pollachi Main Road. The key public mass transport for the people here is the buses run by the State Government & Private Sector thus providing a competitive service to the people. Buses are available very frequently from Palladam to Pollachi, Vellakovil, Udumalpet, Tiruppur, Coimbatore, Karur, Tiruchy, Dharapuram and Madurai.

== Education ==
Government Arts and Science College, Palladam inaugurated in 2017 has wide variety of courses including Bachelor of Science in chemistry, Mathematics, Costume Design and Computer Science and Bachelor of Arts in English and Tamil Literature. Also the college offers courses in Bachelor of Commerce.

SCAD Institute of Technology established in 2012 offers courses in Bachelor of Engineering in various disciplines including Mechanical, Computers, Civil, Electrical, Electronics and Communications.

Palladam has also many notable schools. Including Kannammal Institution, Blue bird, Swami Vivekananda, Government Higher Secondary School, Adharsh, Kingsberry, Infant Jesus, etc.

== Economy ==
The economy of Palladam and its surroundings is mainly based on textile industry, agriculture and poultry farming.

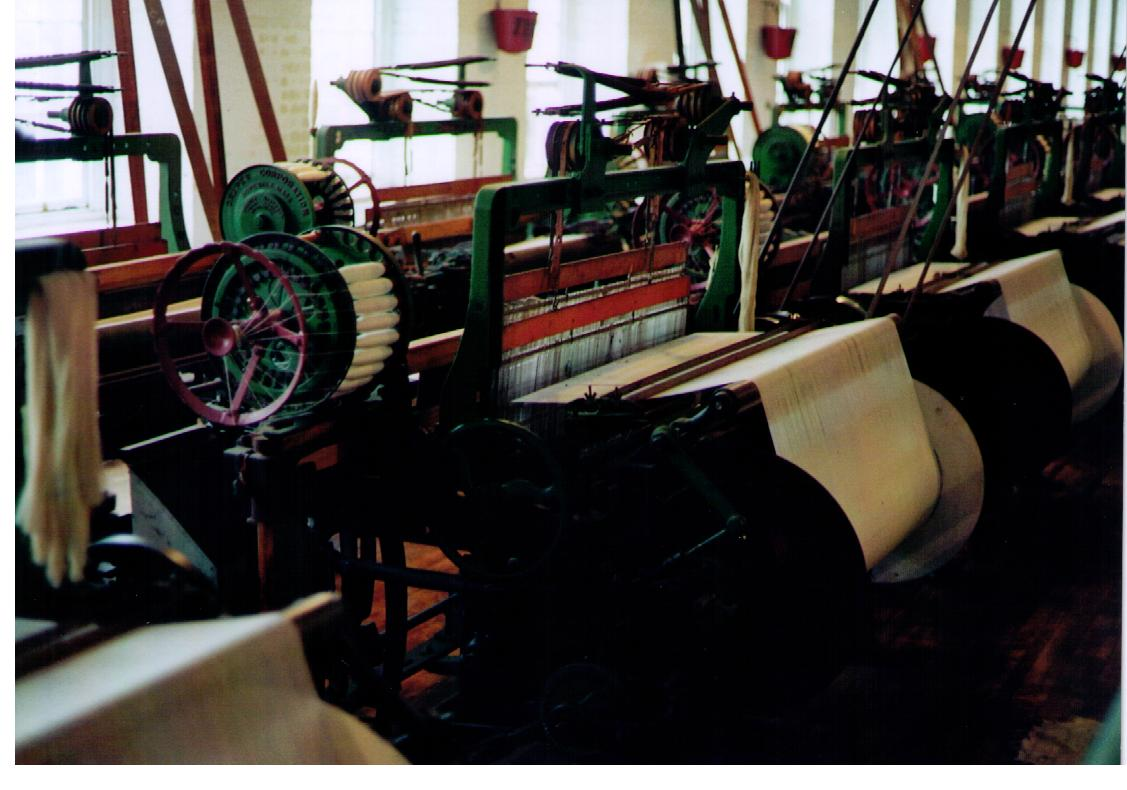
Powerloom Machine

=== Textile industry ===
In and around Palladam there are many weaving and knitting centres mostly meant for export to foreign countries, thus earning a considerable foreign exchange. Most of the major textile houses are set up as vertically integrated units enabling them to produce clothing at a better quality and competitive price. This sector along with the poultry sector provides direct and indirect employment to numerous people in the region. The region also attracts labourers from other part of the nation, for weaving more than 4,50,000 power looms are working around palladam. Nowadays many Hi-Tech weaving machines like Sulzer and Airjet looms are installed.

==== Textile mills ====
There are many Textile mills are located in and around Palladam. They provide the essential raw materials for the Textile industry in and around Palladam as well as Exports to various other countries.

==== Palladam HiTech Weaving Park (PHWP) ====
The Palladam Hi-Tech Weaving Park (India's First and Largest Hi tech Textile weaving Park) was commissioned in 2007 and is one of the nations advanced weaving parks. It is a cluster of the textile industry and contains a variety of textile factories. This park serves as a model for the different other textile parks that been planned by the Govt. of INDIA (GoI). Spreads over 65 acres, the Palladam Hi-Tech Weaving Park (PHWP) is the first of the integrated textile park models. The PHWP functions on the model of a Public-Private partnership, managed by user entrepreneurs. The PHWP acts as a sourcing hub for the global industrial fabrics, home furnishing, and garments market. Leading strategic and project management support to the integrated textile parks, is IL&FS CDI, a leading multidisciplinary conglomerate with interests in infrastructure, finance, capacity building initiatives, technology and marketing.

=== Poultry industry ===
Major Indian Poultry firms are from this region, some of the well known poultry farms are Suguna Poultry Farms, Pioneer Poultry Group, Shanthi Poultry Group, Swathi Poultry Farms (Hatcheries), which are in the Indian Poultry industry. The chickens raised here are transported to nearby states and these companies have also set up similar contract farming in other parts of the nation. Palladam Broiler Rate is the benchmark in the Indian Poultry industry. The Broiler rates are fixed by the BCC called as Broiler Coordination Committee. It is a very powerful organization in the Indian Poultry Industry. Its members are one of the leading poultry integrators in INDIA.

=== Agriculture ===
Agriculture has a great history in Palladam right from the introduction of modern farming in the early 1980s to the plantation of variety of medicinal and other trial based plantation till date. The people here are involved mainly in Agriculture like Cotton and Tobacco. The people of Palladam have always relied upon Agriculture like many other towns in INDIA. The association with Agriculture hasn't largely diminished over the years due to the continuous involvement of community & the participation from the younger generation.

The primary vegetation was cotton in the early 1970s and 1980s at the time of the textile boom. Later the town adopted the Maize crop with the boom in the Poultry industry thus aiding the industries with local supplies to compete with both quality and pricing.

Other vegetation are largely based on the local demands like common vegetables consumed by the house holds like the Onions (both small & big), Tomatoes, Brinjal, Okra, Peas, etc. Large amount of Cattle & Poultry in the region also leads to vegetation consumed by them.

Currently this industry is not doing well due to insufficient and un-timely rains along with the decrease in the ground water levels by significant amount in the recent years.

=== Wind turbines ===
The surrounding areas has seen a surge in wind turbine installations because of the location of the town across the Palghat Gap. The wind turbines installed here ranges from as low as 200 kW to 2000 kW. The power generated by these wind turbines largely accounts for the State's Electricity Supply & INDIA's highest installed wind capacity is in and around this town. Thus it is also known as the green city for its renewable expertise. This industry also accounts for both direct and indirect employment to the communities nearby.

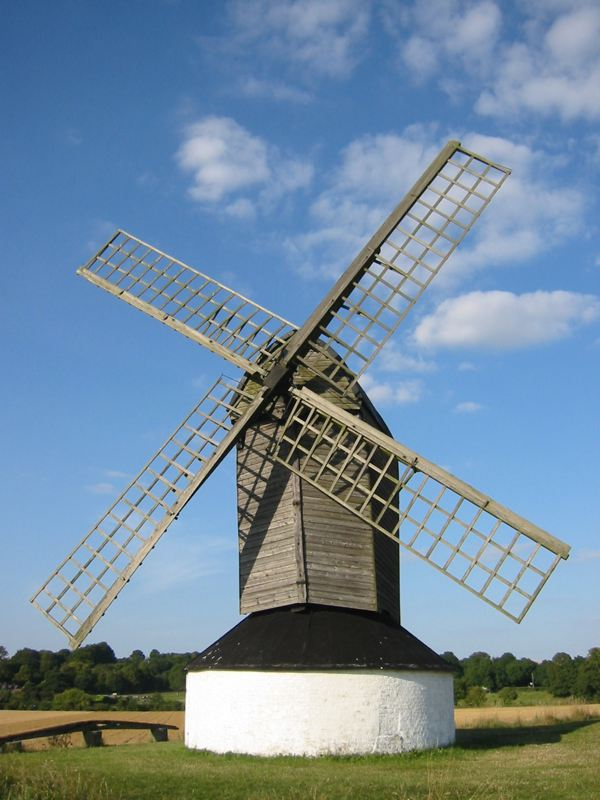
Windmill

== Politics ==
Palladam assembly constituency is part of Coimbatore Lok Sabha constituency. The present MLA for this constituency is Mr. MSM Anandhan from AIADMK.
