= Kangeyam taluk =

Coordinates: 11.0054°N 77.5620°E

Kangeyam taluk is a taluk of Tirupur district of the Indian state of Tamil Nadu. The headquarters of the taluk is the town of Kangeyam. Kangeyam Taluk Formed From Bifurcation of Dharapuram taluk.

== Demographics ==
According to the 2011 census, the taluk of Kangeyam had a population of 208,227 with 104,167 males and 104,060 females. There were 999 women for every 1000 men. The taluk had a literacy rate of 69.25. Child population in the age group below 6 was 7,329 Males and 6,874 Females.

== Villages under Kangayam Taluk ==
The taluk has 2 panchayat union

1. Kangeyam
2. Vellakoil

The taluk is divided into 4 Firkas

1. Kangeyam
2. Uthiyur
3. Nathakadaiyur
4. Vellakoil

The following villages are under Kangayam taluk.

1. Alampadi
2. Bala sumathiram pudur
3. Ganapathypalayam
4. Keeranoor
5. Maravapalayam
6. Semmankalippalayam
7. Marudurai
8. Nathakadaiyur
9. Padiyur
10. Palayakottai
11. Pappani
12. Paranjeervazhi
13. Pothyapalayam
14. Sivanmalai
15. Thamburetty palayam
16. Veeranapalayam
17. Valliarachal
18. Veeracholapuram
19. Thittuparai
20. Arutholuvu
21. Uthiyur
22. Nillali
23. Nillali goundampalayam
