= Kangeyam =

Historical town in India

- Town
- Location in Tamil Nadu, India
- Coordinates: 11.0054°N 77.5620°E
- Country: India
- State: Tamil Nadu
- District: Tiruppur
- Taluk: Kangeyam

Government
  - Type: First Grade Municipality
  - Body: Kangeyam Municipality
  - MLA: N. S. N. Nataraj

Area
  - Total: 22.17 km^{2} (8.56 sq mi)
- Elevation: 310 m (1,020 ft)

Population (2024)
  - Total: 44,000
  - Density: 2,000/km^{2} (5,100/sq mi)
- Demonym: Kangeyan

Languages
  - Official: Tamil
- Time zone: UTC+5:30 (IST)
- PIN: 638701
- Telephone code: 04257
- Vehicle registration: TN-42Y
- Website: municipality.tn.gov.in/kangeyam/

Kangeyam (Tamil: [kaːŋɡeːjam]) is a town and municipality in Kangeyam taluk of Tiruppur district in the Indian state of Tamil Nadu. Situated along the National Highway 81, it is around 28 km (17 mi) from the district headquarters Tiruppur. the economy of the town is dependent on agriculture and allied activities including rice hulling, coconut oil and ghee extraction. The Kangayam cattle is a breed of cattle that is indigenous to the area around Kangeyam.

== History ==
Kangeyam was the capital of the Kongu Nadu region in ancient times. An ancient beryl mine near Kangeyam produced Indian beryl for export to the Roman Empire, which is why numerous Roman coins have been found near the town.

== Climate ==
Kangeyam is one of the driest parts of Tamil Nadu, with an average annual rainfall around 60 cm (24 in). It is dependent on the northeast monsoon, with most of the rainfall occurring during the months of October and November. During the southwest monsoon, there are gusts of wind, and less rainfall. January to March are the coolest months with April and May being the hottest of the year with thundershowers during the day.

== Demographics ==
Religion
Religion	Percent(%)
Hindu	88.86%
Muslim	6.22%
Christian	3.91%
Other	1.01%

According to the 2011 Census of India, Kangeyam had a population of 32,147 with a ratio of 987 females for every 1,000 males, higher than the national average of 929. 2,811 residents were under the age of six, with 1,485 under-six males and 1,326 females. Scheduled Castes and Scheduled Tribes accounted for 9.33% and 0.07% of the population, respectively. The average literacy of the town was 77.7%, higher than the national average of 72.99%. The town had a total of 9,449 households. There were a total of 15,720 workers. Of the working population, 392 were cultivators, 603 were main agricultural laborers, 1,610 worked in household industries, 11,503 worked in other industries, 1,612 were marginal workers, 63 were marginal cultivators, 155 were marginal agricultural laborers, 225 were marginal workers in household industries, and 1,169 were other marginal workers.

Around 3% of the people were below the poverty line, much lower than the national average of 29.8% and the state average of 17.1%. The population is 88.86% Hindu, 6.22% Muslim, 3.91% Christian, 0.02% Sikh, 0.02% Buddhist, 0.01% Jain and 0.01% Other. 0.95% of the respondents followed no religion or did not state their religion.

== Administration and politics ==
Kangeyam comes under the Tiruppur district. Kangeyam assembly constituency is part of Erode (Lok Sabha constituency). K. E. Prakash is the current Member of Parliament representing Kangeyam. N. S. N. Nataraj (AIADMK) represents Kangeyam Constituency in the Tamil Nadu Legislative Assembly.

== Economy ==
The economy of Kangeyam is mostly based on agriculture, and allied activities such as rice hulling, manufacture of coconut copra (dried kernel used in coconut oil production), ghee production and groundnut cultivation. The region, despite being semi-arid and rain-fed, produces rice throughout the year. Kangeyam is called the "Rice and Oil town" due to its large scale rice and coconut oil industries.

Rice cultivated in the Kaveri delta region in Tamil Nadu and neighboring states of Karnataka and Andhra Pradesh are brought to Kangeyam for processing. There are more than 500 rice mills in the taluk. Coconut oil production in Kangeyam began in the 1980s, and the coconut oil produced here is marketed across India and exported to other countries. There are about 150 coconut oil manufacturing units in and around Kangeyam and about 500 kopra processing and drying units in Kangeyam Taluk. Ghee and ornamental stone production are other major businesses in Kangeyam. "Moon Stone" from the town is exported to other countries. Other industries include vehicle body building, manufacture welded wires, and knit cloth manufacturing.

=== Kangeyam bull ===
The Kangayam cattle is a breed of cattle that is indigenous to the area around Kangeyam. It is known for its superior draught strength and adaptability to poor nutritional conditions. They have compact bodies with short, stout legs, strong hooves, a short neck and a firm hump, and are usually grey or white in colour.

== Transport ==
Kangeyam is well connected by roads to other major towns in the district. It is located on National Highway 81. There are two bus stands in Kangeyam–one for local buses and other for intercity buses. State highways that run through Kangeyam are:

1. SH 81 (Gobichettipalayam - Kangeyam)
2. SH 96 (Perundurai - Kangeyam)
3. SH 172 (Tiruppur - Kangeyam),
4. SH 83A (Erode - Kangeyam - Dharapuram)
5. SH 189 (Kangeyam - Kodumudi).

== Landmarks ==
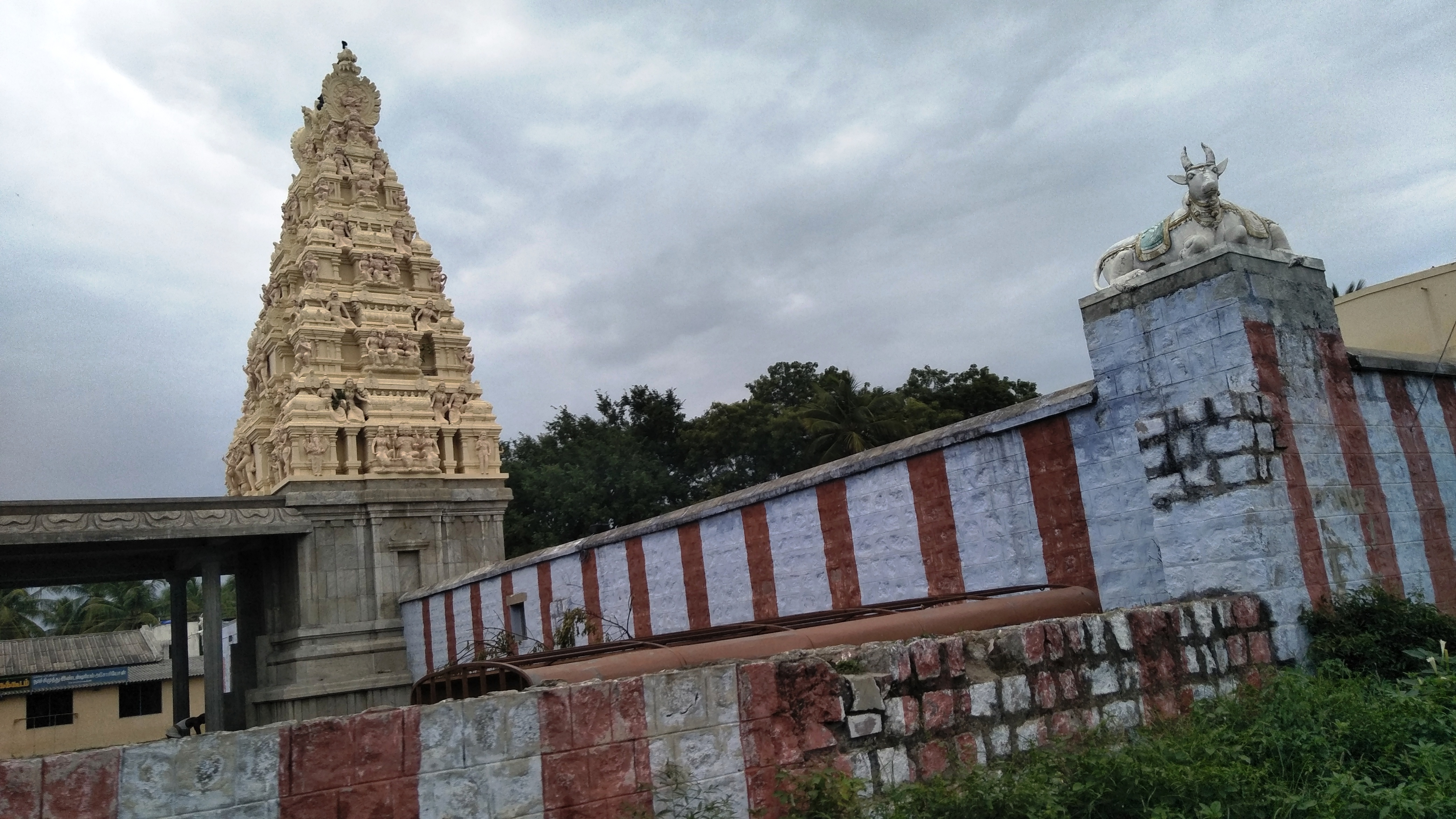
A temple in Kangeyam

Sivanmalai is a Hindu temple situated about 4 km (2.5 mi) from Kangeyam. The temple is dedicated to Murugan, and is located atop a small hillock. Uthiyur, located 18 km (11 mi) south of the town has numerous temples.

== Utilities ==
There is a 54-bed government hospital in Kangeyam which has been upgraded into a district headquarters government hospital. Four Primary Health Centres are under the administration of the Kangeyam health block. Besides these, there are a number of private hospitals in the town. A number of schools and colleges are situated in and around Kangeyam.
