= Southern Ring Road, Erode =

Road in Tamil Nadu

Southern Ring Road, Erode South Ring Road

Route information
- Maintained by Highways and Minor Ports Department
- Length: 15 km (9.3 mi)
- Status: Opened

Major junctions
- East end: Kokkarayanpettai
- Parisalthurai; Muthugoundampalayam; Anaikkalpalayam; Rangampalayam
- West end: Thindal Chinnamedu

Location
- Country: India

Highway system
- Roads in India; Expressways; National; State; Asian

The Erode South Ring Road or Southern Ring Road is a 15-kilometer (9.3 mi) long semi ring road laid around the South Indian city of Erode in Tamil Nadu. It passes through the southern suburbs of the city connecting it with Namakkal district in the east.

The state government of Tamil Nadu has sanctioned the project in 2006, with a funding of ₹85 crore, with a land acquisition of 180 acres. Among which, ₹30 crore will be given as compensation for 120 acres of private patta land.

== Traffic in the City ==
Erode, being the district headquarters and a major marketing hub in the region, has an extensive network of radial roads originating from core city and the growth of the city is along these transport corridors. This results in the rapid increase in traffic congestion inside the core city. Also, the number of trucks entering the city is significantly high. The narrow and congested city roads does not cater to the increasing traffic needs. This paved the need for developing better road infrastructure for vehicles travelling across Erode.

=== NH 544 Western Bypass Road ===
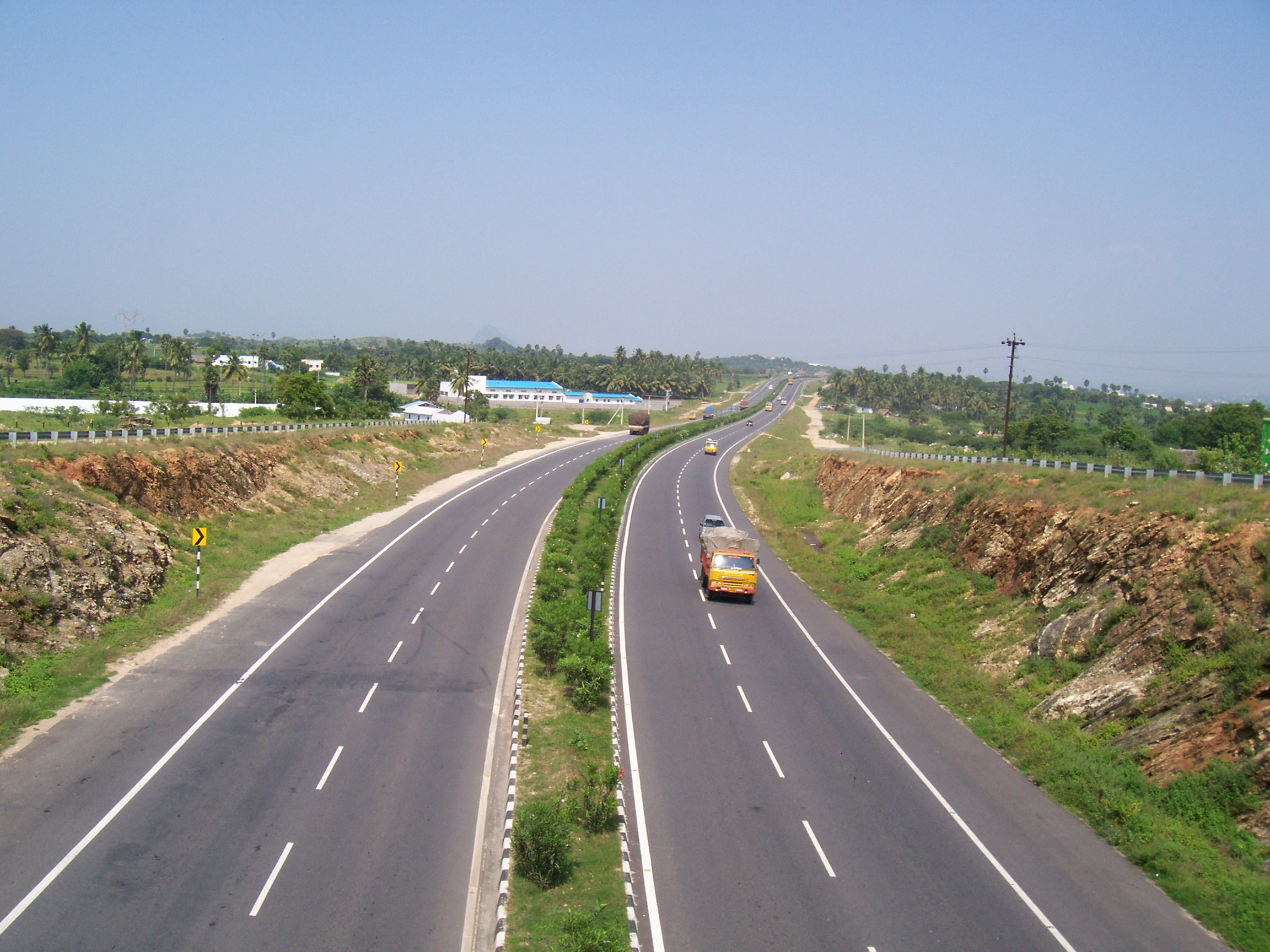
National Highway 544 Bypass near Chithode

The four-laned National Highway 544 (NH–544) connecting Salem with Kochi has been strategically planned and constructed along the western periphery of the city between Bhavani and Perundurai through the suburban areas like Lakshmi Nagar, Chithode, Gangapuram and Nasiyanur acts as a natural western bypass road for Erode. Due to the presence of this highway, the growth pattern of the city is in North-west direction. Vehicles from Erode city can access this highway through the arterial roads like Sathy road, Bhavani road, Nasiyanur road and Perundurai Road. But still the traffic due to the vehicles flowing from South and East of the City makes traffic worse. So, the demand raised for the construction of Ring Road for the city.

== Ring formation around the city ==
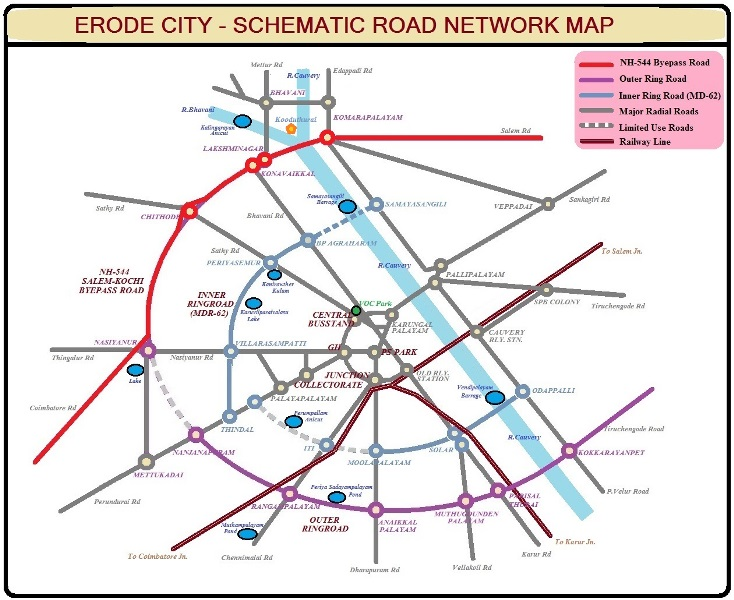
Schematic representation of Road network in the city of Erode

The semi ring road around the city is laid along the southern suburbs, with a plan to connect with the NH–544 western by-pass near Nasiyanur, which further connects Chithode, Bhavani and to Komarapalayam in Namakkal district in the west. The road is expected to divert around 2200 trucks and buses away from the city roads. This stretch linking Kokkarayanpet with Bhavani will make a semi-circular ring around the city.

Also, the access to the fast growing urban nodes located in the eastern side of Kaveri river like Pallipalayam, Sankagiri and Tiruchengode is limited with a single Cauvery Bridge. The Comprehensive Mobility Plan submitted by Erode City Municipal Corporation suggests networking of road to these areas for better transit. With the networking of these eastern areas, the ring formation would be made complete.

== Connectivity and Road dimension ==
This Semi Ring Road project is executed in sections.

=== Kokkarayanpettai - Thindal Chinnamedu ===
This primary southern section of the Semi Ring road in the southern periphery is 15 km long, starts from Kokkarayanpet in Namakkal district and ends near Nanjanapuram near Thindal on Perundurai Road in Erode. The road is laid with a provision of expansion for up to 30 meters right of way. This stretch was constructed in three phases.

It connects Kokkarayanpet (Paramathi Road) in the east (Namakkal) with Parisalthurai on Karur Road, Muthugoundampalayam on NH-381A (Vellakoil Road) near Lakkapuram, Anaikkalpalayam on Kangeyam Road through 46 Pudur with Thindal Chinnamedu on Perundurai Road including the Cauvery River Bridge near Parisalthurai and Railway over bridge near Rangampalayam Jeeva Nagar. It was completed and opened during February 2021. This 14.8 km stretch of the road has been opened for public to transit between Kokkarayanpet and Thindal Chinnamedu.

Recently, a 7.4 km section of this Semi Ring road between Anaikkalpalayam and Thindal and a 1 km section between Vellakoil road and Karur road has been widened to 4 lane configuration. And another 4 km section of this southern Ring road between Anaikkalpalayam and Vellakoil road has been converted to 2 lane with paved shoulders. And the remaining stretch is still with 2 lane configuration. At the Kokkarayanpettai end, the 1 km section of this road falls under Namakkal district including the Cauvery river bridge which has been upgraded as SH, while the rest 14 km in Erode district is still maintained as an ODR.

== Proposed Extensions ==
=== Thindal Chinnamedu - Nasiyanur/Chithode (Western arm extension) ===
This proposed western extension of the Ring road is planned to connect Perundurai Road with Nasiyanur or Chithode which can further connect NH-544 Western Bypass road.

Earlier during 2015, the Highways department has prepared a proposal to connect Nanjanapuram near Thindal with Chithode, which will further connect Bhavani via NH 544. But the project didn't take-off.

Recently in 2022, the state government again started preparing a detailed project report at an estimate of Rs.60 lakhs for the extension of the Ring Road from Perundurai road to connect with Nasiyanur road and Sathy road at an approximate length of 10 km.

In the Erode LPA Master Plan for 2041 published durg 2024, it is proposed to extend the Ring road from Thindal Chinnamedu to Komarapalayam road (for a length of 15 km) via Semmampalayam, Kongampalayam and RN Pudur.

=== Solar Parisalthurai - Veppadai (NH 381-A Eastern Ring Road) ===
The Eastern Ring Road is planned from Lakkapuram Parisalthurai to Veppadai via Kadachanallur (13 km) and is proposed as a part of the 4-laning project of Vellakoil-Erode-Sankagiri NH 381A corridor highway under Bharatmala Pariyojana Scheme.

=== Cauvery Riverfront Bypass road (Eastern Link road) ===
While the Eastern ring road connecting Parisalthurai with Veppadai is planned as a common bypass for the city and Pallipalayam by the NHAI, the master plan 2041 recommended to the state government with a proposal for another bypass road (or link road) in the Eastern side of the core city areas that runs parallel to the cauvery river. It is proposed to start from Karur road near Parisalthurai Ring road, and goes through Vendipalayam Barrage, Karungalpalayam checkpost, B.P.Agraharam barrage and terminates near R.N.Pudur on Bhavani road. Of this proposed 14 km alignment, most part of it will run on the banks of the river. A detailed project report is being prepared by the Highways department for this project.

=== Concentric Ring Roads around the City ===
In the Erode LPA Master Plan for 2041, two concentric Ring roads for Erode has been proposed as below:

- Peripheral Ring Road: Chavadipalayam to Ellispettai via Nanjai Uttukuli, Kaspapettai, Kavundachipalayam, Kathirampatti, Tiruvachi, Kanchikoil.
- Satellite Ring Road: Pasur to Pethampalayam via Modakurichi, Avalpoondurai, Vellode, Perundurai, Thudupathi.

This was also came up in the Comprehensive Mobility Plan prepared for Erode Local Planning Area that has proposed the development of a new Satellite Ring Road connecting Pasur-Modakkurichi-Vellode-Perundurai-Kanjikoil-Periyapuliyur-Bhavani Urachikottai running for a length of around 60 km.
