= Perundurai Road, Erode =

Road in Tamil Nadu

Perundurai Road
- Maintained by: Highways of Tamil Nadu
- Length: 10.6 mi (17.1 km)
- East end: Thanthai Periyar Government Hospital junction
- Major junctions: Thindal Chinnamedu ORR
- West end: Perundurai

Perundurai Road is one of the major arterial roads in the city of Erode in India. Running from the centre of the city towards the west, the road starts from the junction near Thanthai Periyar Government Hospital and terminates near the western suburb Perundurai. This 17 km road stretch further extends to the west connecting SIPCOT Industrial Park and joins NH 544 that enables the connectivity to Coimbatore and Kochi. The commercial and residential establishments along this road make it as the growth identifier of Erode, forecasting the development towards the west. The width of the road is making it four-lane to most of the stretch while a few km of the stretch near the western end has been widened to six-lane carriageway.

== Important places and Landmarks ==
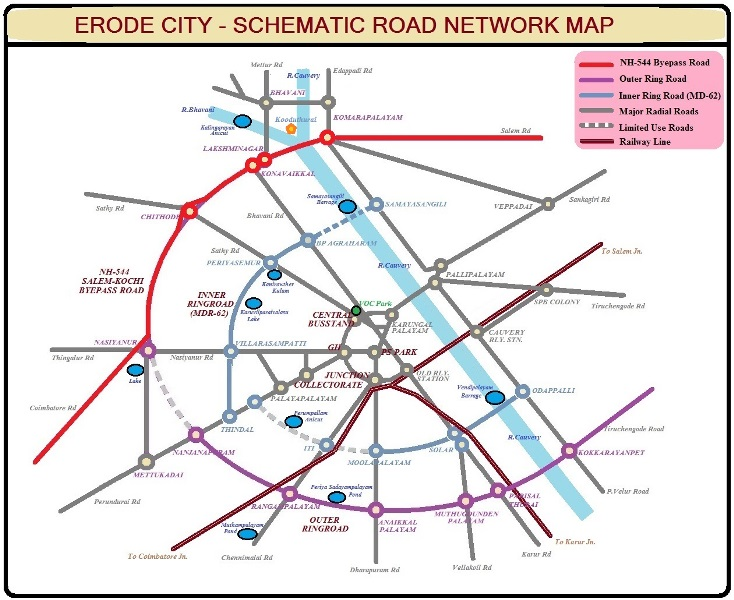
Schematic representation of Road network in the city of Erode

- GH Flyover
- Kalingarayan Bungalow
- District Collector's Office
- Reliance Hyper Mall
- Erode West MLA Office
- Thindal Murugan Temple
- Vellalar College for Women
- Kongu Arts and Science College
- Nandha Engineering College
- Erode Rural Sub-division Police DSP Office
- Perundurai Bus Station
- Perundurai SIPCOT Industrial Park
- Palanisamy College of Arts and Science
- Nandha arts and science college

== Hospitals ==
Several major Hospitals of the city were located along this stretch. During 2020 coronavirus pandemic in Tamil Nadu, all the four notified private hospitals for treatment were located along this stretch apart from the Government run Erode Medical College Hospital.

- Thanthai Periyar Government Hospital
- KMCH Speciality Hospital
- Maaruthi Medical Center & Hospital
- Sudha Hospitals
- Erode Medical Center & Hospitals
- Care 24 Medical Center & Hospitals
- Erode Cancer Center
- Nandha Medical College & Hospital
- Perundurai Government Hospital

== Elevated corridor ==
Considering the traffic congestion in this stretch, a plan for construction of Elevated Corridor has been announced by Government of Tamil Nadu in 2018. This Elevated Corridor has been planned for a length of 5.4 km starting from Kalingarayan Illam and terminating near Thindalmedu Ring Road intersection.
