= Murugan Temple =

Murugan Temple may refer to the following Hindu Temples:

== India ==
- Balasubramaniyaswamy Temple, Vennaimalai, Karur, Tamil Nadu
- Engan Murugan Temple, Engan, Thiruvarur, Tamil Nadu
- Kundrathur Murugan Temple, Chennai, Kancheepuram, Tamil Nadu
- Kuzhanthai Velappar Temple (Poombarai, Kodaikanal Murugan Temple), Kodaikanal, Dindigul, Tamil Nadu
- Murugan Temple, Kumaranmalai, Pudukkottai, Tamil Nadu
- Murugan Temple, Kumaravayalur, Tiruchirapalli, Tamil Nadu
- Murugan Temple, Saluvankuppam, Kanchipuram, Tamil Nadu
- Dhandayuthapani Swamy Temple, Palani, Dindigul, Tamil Nadu
- Ratnagiri Murugan Temple, Thirumanikundram, Vellore, Tamil Nadu
- Thindal Murugan Temple, Thindal, Erode, Tamil Nadu
- Subramaniya Swamy Temple, Tiruchendur, Thiruchendur, Thoothukudi, Tamil Nadu
- Subramaniya Swamy Temple, Thiruparankundram, Tirupparankunram, Madurai, Tamil Nadu
- Subramaniya Swamy Temple, Tiruttani, Thiruttani, Thiruvallur, Tamil Nadu
- Vayalur Murugan Temple, Vayalur, Tiruchirapalli, Tamil Nadu
- Viralimalai Subramanya Swamy temple, Viralimalai, Pudukkottai, Tamil Nadu

== Other places ==
- List of Hindu temples in Indonesia
- List of Hindu temples in Malaysia
- Murugan Temple of North America, Lanham, Maryland, U.S.
- List of Hindu temples in the United States
