= Kuravan Palayam =

Village in India

Periya Kuravan Palayam
- village
- Location in Tamil Nadu, India Periya Kuravan Palayam (India)
- Coordinates: 11.4065945°N 77.4672443°E
- Country: India
- State: Tamil Nadu
- District: Erode

Population (2001)
  - Total: 850

Languages
  - Official: Tamil
- Time zone: UTC+5:30 (IST)
- PIN: 638476
- Telephone code: 04285
- Vehicle registration: TN-36

PeriyaKuravan Palayam village, Nagadevam Palayam post, also known as Velliankattu Pudur, is a small village of less than 150 inhabitants, situated in the Gobi taluk, Erode district in Tamil Nadu, India. It has one government library. The nearest village is Ayyam Pudhur. It is situated near to Gobichettipalayam at about 10 km. Agriculture is the primary occupation, with coconuts, rice, Turmeric and sugarcane being the main crops grown.

== Location ==
Kuravan Palayam can be reached by bus from Gobi town (Bus No: 10A). Kuravan Palayam is 10 kilometers from Gobi and 20 kilometers from the Perundurai town (Bus No: P4).

Kuravan Palayam has an average elevation of 330 metres (1082 feet).

== Demographics ==
As of the 2001 Indian census, Kuravan Palayam had a population of 125. Males constitute 51% of the population and females 49%. Ayyam Pudhur has an average literacy rate of 60%, higher than the national average of 59.5%; with male literacy at 83% and female literacy at 67%. 10% of the population is under 6 years of age.

== Climate ==
The climate in general is dry and characterized by scant rainfall. The maximum rainfall is recorded in Gobichettipalayam and Gobi taluk. Unlike the nearby Coimbatore district which is blessed with a healthy climate, Ayyam Pudhur village has dry weather throughout the year except during the monsoons. The Palghat Gap in the Western Ghats, which has a moderating effect on the climate of Coimbatore district, does not render much help in bringing down the dry climate in this area. The cool moist wind that gushes out of the west coast through Palghat Gap loses its coolness and becomes dry by the time it crosses Coimbatore district and reaches Ayyam Pudhur.

Generally the first two months of the year are pleasant, but in March the temperature begins to rise, which persists till the end of May. The highest temperatures are normally recorded during May. The showers during this period do not provide much relief from the oppressive heat; however there is a slight improvement in the climate during the June–August period. During the pre-monsoon period, the temperature reverses its trend. By September the sky gets heavily overcast, although the rains are meagre. The northeast monsoon sets in vigorously only during October–November, and by December the rains disappear, rendering the climate clear but pleasant.

== Economy ==
Kuravan Palayam is well known for handloom, and powerloom textile products and readymade garments. Products such as coconuts rice, Turmeric, Banana are marketed here in bulk. These products are exported to other states and countries.

== Fairs and festivals ==
There are one old temples dedicated to Maari amman.

== Media and communication ==
Kuravan Palayam has two major English dailies, The Hindu and the New Indian Express. Tamil-language morning dailies include Dina Malar, Dina Thanthi, Dina Mani and Dinakaran, and there are two evening papers, Tamil Murasu and Malar. A shortwave radio station is operated by All India Radio, with most programmes in Tamil, English and Hindi. Five FM radio stations are available in Gobi: Rainbow FM by All India Radio, Suryan FM by the Sun Network, Radio Mirchi, Radio City, and Hello FM. These private radio stations air exclusively Tamil programmes, including film music broadcast from Coimbatore.

=== Telecommunications Networks ===
Aircel, Airtel and Vodafone each have one cellphone GSM tower as launched on 20 December 2009.

Kuravan Palayam has good a communications infrastructure, with all major service providers present in the area. Services available are DOT landline, CDMA and GSM. Fiber-optic cables were laid in 2001, improving internet access, which had begun with the establishment of a dial-up and broadband connection in 1996.

== Public Library ==
- One TN Govt owned public Library is there
