= Murugampalayam =

Village in India

- Village
- Country: India
- State: Tamil Nadu
- District: Erode

Government
  - Type: Panchayat

Population
  - Total: 500

Languages
  - Official: Tamil
- Time zone: UTC+5:30 (IST)
- Postal code: 638056
- Nearest city: Perundurai
- Lok Sabha constituency: Erode
- Vidhan Sabha constituency: Perundurai

Murugampalayam is a village near Vaipadi in Perundurai Taluk of Erode district. Administratively under Vaipadi panchayat.
