= SPB Colony =

SPB Colony (Seshasayee Paper and Boards Colony) is a residential locality in the Urban Agglomeration of Erode in Indian state of Tamil Nadu. It is located 7 kilometres (4.3 mi) from Erode Central Bus Station and 9 kilometres (5.6 mi) from Erode Junction, on the way to Tiruchengode. The colony consists of housing for the employees of Seshasayee Paper. The colony houses a park, public recreational house and community center.
