= Veppadai =

Village in Tamil Nadu, India

Coordinates: 11.4057°N 77.7882°E

Veppadai is a small town located on the Erode-Salem main road in Komarapalayam taluk, Namakkal district, Tamil Nadu, India. It is located at the junction between the Tiruchengode-Komarapalayam road and the Pallipalayam-Sankari road. It is 13 kilometres (8 mi) from Tiruchengode, 9 kilometres (6 mi) from Komarapalayam, and 9 kilometres (6 mi) from Erode.

Veppadai is surrounded by many textile mills and contains a 24-hour transport facility.

== Neighborhoods ==
- Pallipalayam
- Erode junction
- Tiruchengode
- Erode Bus terminus
- Komarapalayam
- Sankagiri
- Bhavani
