= State Highway 190 (Tamil Nadu) =

Road in Tamil Nadu, India

State Highway 190

Route information
- Maintained by Highways and Minor Ports Department
- Length: 17.2 km (10.7 mi)

Major junctions
- North end: Karumandampalayam
- South end: Salaipudur

Location
- Country: India
- State: Tamil Nadu
- Districts: Erode.
- Primary destinations: Vellottamparappu

Highway system
- Roads in India; Expressways; National; State; Asian; State Highways in Tamil Nadu

State Highway 190 runs in Erode district of Tamil Nadu, India. It is a second major road for connecting the towns of Erode and Karur.

== Route ==
The highway runs parallel to Erode-Karur Highway as an alternate road between Karumandampalayam and Salaipudur, passing through Vellottamparappu, Thamaraipalayam and Othakadai to a length of 17.2 km. Using this road will eliminate the need to pass 2 level crossings which is present in the main highway.

== Major junctions ==
- Branches off from State Highway 84 at Karumandampalayam
- State Highway 189 at Othakadai
- Joins back with State Highway 84 at Salaipudur
