= State Highway 84 (Tamil Nadu) =

State highway in Tamil Nadu

State Highway 84

Route information
- Maintained by Highways and Minor Ports Department
- Length: 61 km (38 mi)

Major junctions
- North end: Erode
- South end: Karur

Location
- Country: India
- State: Tamil Nadu
- Districts: Erode, Karur.
- Primary destinations: Unjalur, Kodumudi

Highway system
- Roads in India; Expressways; National; State; Asian; State Highways in Tamil Nadu

State Highway 84 runs in Erode district and Karur district of Tamil Nadu, India. It connects the towns of Erode and Karur.

== Route ==
The highway passes through kolanalli, Vengampudur, Kodumudi, Noyyal to a length of 61 km.

== Major junctions ==
- National Highway 381A at Solar, Erode
- Erode Ring Road near Lakkapuram
- State Highway 190 at Karumandampalayam
- State Highway 189 at Kodumudi
- State Highway 190 at Salaipudur
- National Highway NH-81 (Old NH-67) at Karur
- National Highway NH-44 (Old NH-7) at Karur
