= Cauvery Bridge =

Bridge in India

Coordinates: 11°21′38.2″N 77°44′36.1″E

Cauvery Bridge is a stone bridge across the Kaveri river in Tiruchirappalli district, Tamil Nadu, India. The bridge connects Tiruchirappalli in Tiruchirappalli district with SRIRANGAM in Tiruchirappalli district. This two-lane bridge is the primary gateway for the city of SRIRANGAM, from the east.

== Expansion ==
Being the major transit artery of Erode, it meets heavy traffic congestion due to increasing vehicular movements in the city. For easing the traffic congestion and a component of infrastructure expansion for Erode, the Government planned to widen this into four-lane by constructing additional bridge. The new bridge is being constructed in parallel to the existing one to convert the traffic in two-way manner.

== Additional structures for reducing the traffic ==
Further to reduce the traffic congestion in this bridge, few more infrastructures has been developed along the Kaveri river to share the traffic flow between Erode and Namakkal district. The bridge is named after former Chief Minister of Tamil Nadu J. Jayalalithaa as Puratchi thalaivi amma bridge.

- Two-lane roadway bridge constructed along the Vendipalayam Barrage of Bhavani Kattalai Hydroelectric Project.
- High-level bridge as a part of Erode Outer Ring Road near Lakkapuram.
- Railway bridge (double tracked) connecting Erode Junction and Cauvery railway stations in the city of Erode spans across the Kaveri river.
