= Ayyam Pudhur =

Village in India

- Village
- Location in Tamil Nadu, India Ayyam Pudhur (India)
- Coordinates: 11.4121263°N 77.4757522°E
- Country: India
- State: Tamil Nadu
- District: Erode

Population (2001)
  - Total: 650

Languages
  - Official: Tamil
- Time zone: UTC+5:30 (IST)
- PIN: 638452
- Telephone code: 04285
- Vehicle registration: TN-36

Ayyam Pudhur village, Nagadevam Palayam post, is a small village of less than 150 inhabitants, situated in the Gobi taluk, Erode district in Tamil Nadu. It is located approximately 10 km (6 mi) from Gobichettipalayam. The nearest big village is Vellan Kovil.

== Geography ==
Ayyam Pudhur has an average elevation of 330 metres (1082 feet).

== Transportation ==
Ayyam Pudhur can be reached by bus from Gobi (Bus No: 10A,10B). Ayyam Pudhur is 10 kilometers from Gobi and 20 kilometers from Perundurai (Bus No: P4).

== Demographics ==
As of the 2001 Indian census, Ayyam Pudhur had a population of 125. Males constitute 51% of the population and females 49%. Ayyam Pudhur has an average literacy rate of 60%, higher than the national average of 59.5%; with male literacy at 83% and female literacy at 67%. 10% of the population is under 6 years of age.

== Climate ==
The climate in general is dry and characterised by scant rainfall. The maximum rainfall is recorded in Gobichettipalayam and the Gobi taluk. Ayyam Pudhur has dry weather throughout the year except during the monsoons. The Palghat Gap in the Western Ghats, which has a moderating effect on the climate of the Coimbatore district, does not render much help in bringing down the dry climate in this area. The cool moist wind that gushes out of the west coast through the Palghat gap, loses its coolness and becomes dry by the time it crosses the Coimbatore district and reaches Ayyam Pudhur.

== Economy ==
Agriculture is the primary occupation, with coconuts, rice, turmeric and sugarcane being the main crops, which are marketed here in bulk. These products are exported to other states and countries.

Ayyam Pudhur is well known for handloom, and powerloom textile products and ready made garments.

== Fairs and festivals ==
There is one old temple dedicated to Mariamman in Ayyam Pudhur.

== Media and communication ==
Ayyam Pudhur has two major English dailies, The Hindu and the New Indian Express. Tamil-language morning dailies include Dina Malar, Dina Thanthi, Dina Mani and Dinakaran, and there are two evening papers, Tamil Murasu and Malar. A shortwave radio station is operated by All India Radio, with most programmes in Tamil, English and Hindi. Five FM radio stations are available in Gobi: Rainbow FM by All India Radio, Suryan FM by the Sun Network, Radio Mirchi, Radio City, and Hello FM. These private radio stations air exclusively Tamil programmes, including film music broadcast from Coimbatore.

=== Telecommunications ===
Ayyam Pudhur has good a communications infrastructure, with all major service providers present in the area. Services available are DOT landline, CDMA and GSM. Fiber-optic cables were laid in 2001, improving internet access, which had begun with the establishment of a dial-up and broadband connection in 1996.

== Educational institutions ==
The village has one Government Elementary School and a Govt Higher Secondary School.
