= Government Erode Medical College =

Medical college in Tamil Nadu, India

Coordinates: 11.281676°N 77.570020°E

- Other name: GEMC
- Former name: IRT Perundurai Medical College
- Motto: Perseverance Perfection Pride
- Type: Government
- Established: 1992; 34 years ago
- Affiliations: Tamil Nadu Dr. M.G.R. Medical University
- Dean: Dr. T. Ravikumar
- Location: Perundurai, Erode, Tamil Nadu, India

Government Erode Medical College, formerly IRT Perundurai Medical College, is a government medical school in Erode, Tamil Nadu. It is affiliated to Tamil Nadu Dr. M.G.R. Medical University. It is located off Salem-Kochi National Highway 544 near Perundurai in Erode. The school includes a hospital. The college was originally established under Institute of Road and Transport by the Tamil Nadu State Transport Corporation.

== History ==
On the suggestion of Lord Willington (then Viceroy of India) in 1930, a district committee to combat tuberculosis was formed in Coimbatore and the decision was made to start a tuberculosis sanatorium in Perundurai near Erode. The foundation stone was laid by Sir K. V. Reddy Naidu on 1 July 1936. The sanatorium was declared open by Sri C. Rajagopalachari in 1939. It was renamed Ramalingam Tuberculosis Sanatorium in 1952. In 1986, the government of Tamil Nadu attached a medical college with the sanatorium under the aegis of Institute of Road Transport. The college has 600 beds and started functioning in 1992. In 2004, doctors' quarters were added. In 2008, a school of nursing has been started in the RTS Hospital premises. And in 2017, the strength of the Medical College was increased from 60 to 100 students intake.

In 2019, Government of Tamil Nadu took over the college and renamed it as Government IRT Perundurai Medical College. During the 2020 coronavirus pandemic in Tamil Nadu, the Government has subsequently renamed the college as Erode Medical College and notified this facility as a designated facility for treating COVID-19 cases in Erode district. During this transfer, out of the total 308.5 acre total land area, 208 acres has been transferred to the Health & Family Welfare department and 0.99 acres to local Panchayat and another 3.9 acres for the formation of public road and the remaining 96.5 acres of land has been retained by the Institute of Road Transport itself.

== Hospital ==
=== Ramalingam Tuberculosis Sanatorium (RTS) Hospital ===
The Ramalingam Tuberculosis Sanatorium Hospital is the 200 bedded original facility with which the medical college was initially attached to. It had around 125 General Wards, 50 Special Wards, and five Deluxe Wards all in 54 separate Tiled-Roof Buildings. 89 Quarters buildings were also present for the RT Sanatorium Hospital. It houses doctor's quarters in the northern side. It was built-up in a sprawling 308.5 acres lush green campus. This 200-bed facility is again revived to take care of COVID-19 patients in 2021.

=== GEMC Main Hospital (GEMCH) ===
It was initially a 550 Bedded Tertiary-care Hospital functioning in a G+2 Storeyed building, opened in 1994. It is having a 20 Kiloliter capacity Cryogenic Oxygen Tank installed to support patients in need of Medical Oxygen. The "Rotary Special Block" with around 400 Beds equipped with Oxygen Support facility has been sponsored by various Rotary Chapters.Currently it functions as a tertiary care hospital with a bed capacity of more than 1200.

== Medical college ==
The college is functioning in a G+3 Storeyed Academic Block, opened in 1992. The college with original intake capacity of 60 seats, has increased the annual intake capacity to 100 seats in 2017, Post graduation in General Surgery 4 seats and 2 seats of Dermatology added in 2021. The college also has separate blocks for Animal House, Mortuary and Post-mortem studies. It has Separate Auditorium and Examination Hall Building. Also, an ATM Facility is there in the front entrance of the college.

=== Hostels & quarters ===
The college has Hostels of two blocks (A & B Block) each for Boys and Girls. It has 24 numbers of Quarters for Junior Medical Officers and 12 Quarters for Senior Medical Officers and 18 Staff Quarters (in 3 Blocks). Apart from this, the college has CRRI-Men's and Women's Hostels.

== School of Nursing ==
The School of Nursing attached to Erode Medical College was started in the year of 2008 with an annual intake of 20 students. It functions in the 6 Old RTS Hospital Buildings. In 2019 the intake has been increased to 60 seats.

=== DMLT ===
The Tamil Nadu Directorate of Medical Education has sanctioned 50 seats for the course of Diploma in Medical Laboratory & Technology (DMLT).

== See also ==
- Thanthai Periyar Government Headquarters Hospital, Erode
