= Brough Memorial Church =

Church in Tamil Nadu, India

- CSI Brough Memorial Church
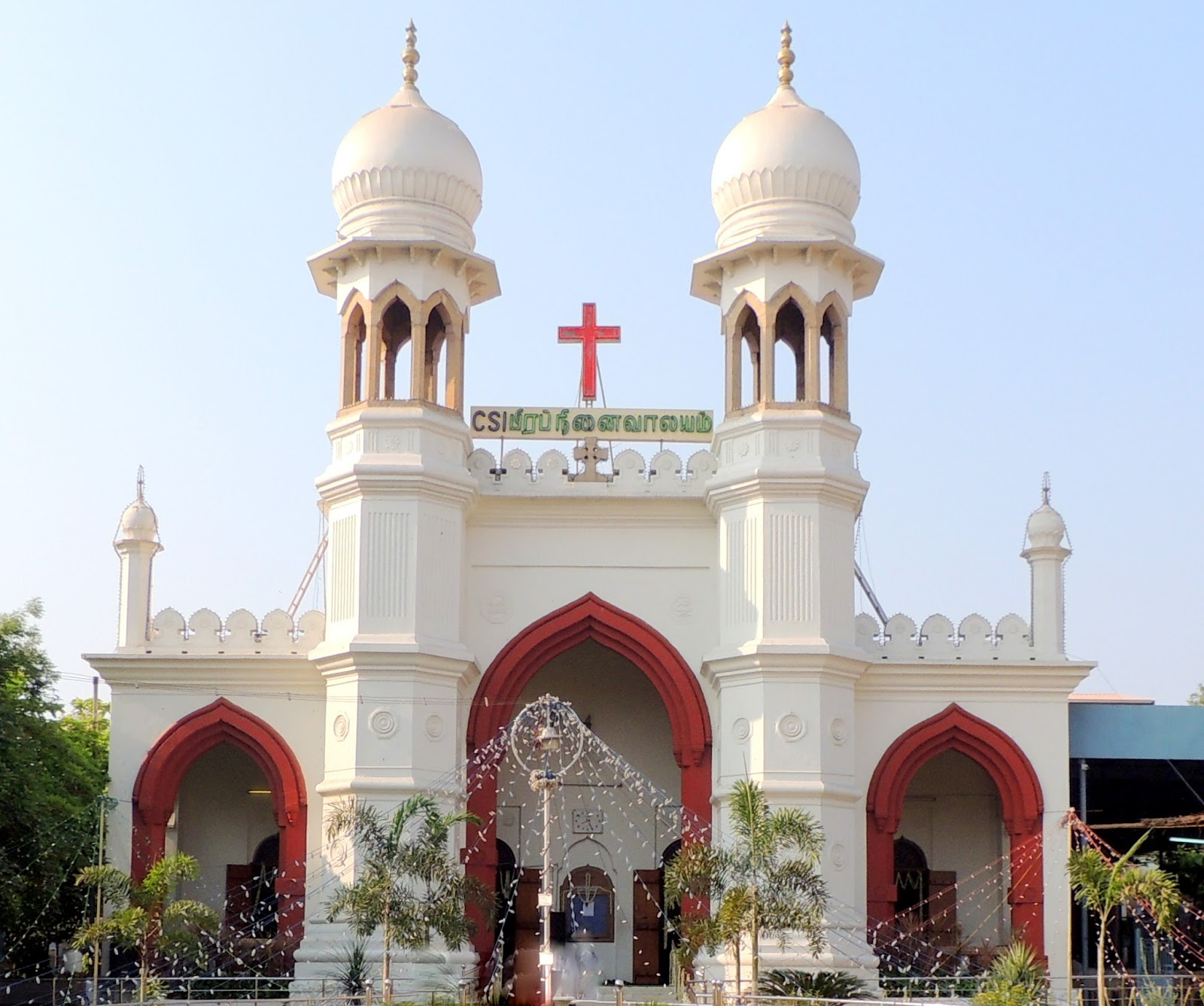
- CSI Brough Memorial Church, Erode

- CSI Brough Memorial Church, Erode, Tamil Nadu
- 11.338701°N 77.726119°E
- Location: Meenakshi Sundaranar Road, Erode, Tamil Nadu
- Country: India
- Denomination: CSI

History
- Status: Parish church
- Founder: Rev. Antony Watson Brough
- Consecrated: 1930

Architecture
- Functional status: Active
- Architectural type: Chapel
- Style: Indo-Saracenic architecture

Administration
- Parish: Erode

Brough Memorial Church or CSI Brough Memorial Church is a CSI church situated in Erode of Tamil Nadu state in the peninsular India. This church was built and consecrated in the year 1930 by Rev. Antony Watson Brough, a missionary from South Wales in Australia.

== Location ==
It is located with the geographic coordinates of 11.338701°N 77.726119°E at an altitude of about 191.95 metres (629.8 ft) above the mean sea level, on Meenakshi Sundaranar Road (previously Brough Road named after the then member of Erode Municipality) at the Panneer Selvam Park circle in Erode city.

== Details ==
This church's facade, intricate carvings and elegant arches reflect a mix of Gothic and Romanesque architectural styles.

Every year, people gather in large numbers in front of this church to welcome the new year.
