= Ardhanareeswarar Temple =

Temple in India

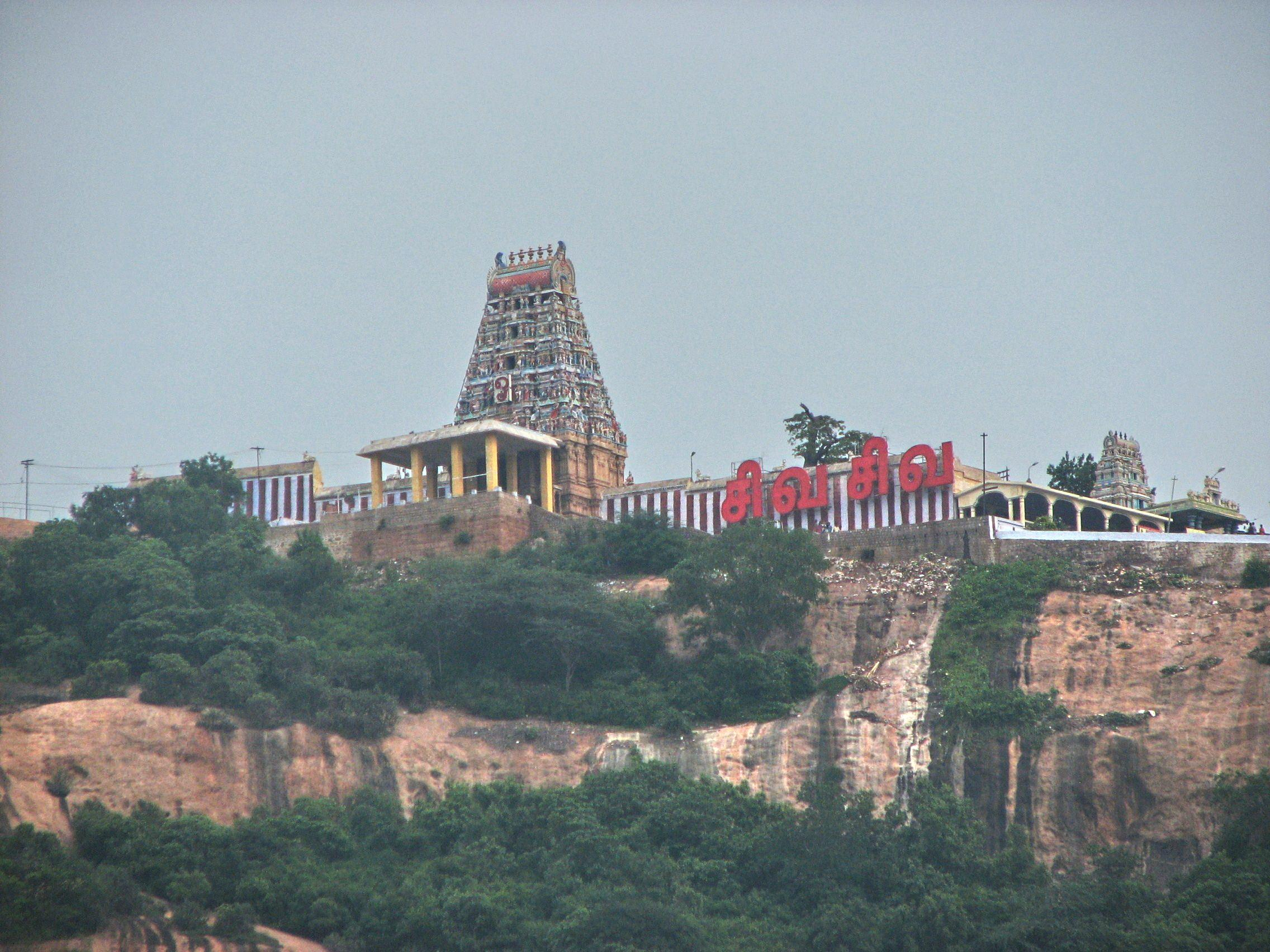

- Location in Tamil Nadu

Religion
- Affiliation: Hinduism
- District: Namakkal
- Deity: Ardhanarishvara
- Festival: Vaikasi Visagam
- Features: Temple tank: Ammayyappar Theertham

Location
- Location: Tiruchengode
- State: Tamil Nadu
- Country: India
- Coordinates: 11°15′N 77°56′E

Architecture
- Type: Dravidian architecture

Specifications
- Direction of façade: east
- Elevation: 198.12 m (650 ft)

Website
- http://www.arthanareeswarar.com

The Ardhanareeswarar Temple, also known as Tirukodimāda Chenkundrūr (Tamil: திருக்கொடிமாடச் செங்குன்றூர்), is an ancient Hindu temple, located in Tiruchengode, in the southern Indian state of Tamil Nadu. The temple is dedicated to Ardhanarishvara, a composite form of the Hindu deities Shiva and his consort Parvati.

The Chenkottu Velavar Temple, dedicated to Murugan (Kartikeya), is also situated on the same hill, and a separate temple for Ganesha, called the Ucchi Pillaiyar Kovil, exists adjacent to the main temple complex.

== History ==
The temple is one of the shrines of the 275 Paadal Petra Sthalams praised in the Tevaram hymns of the Saivite saints. Both Sambandar, who lived in the 5th century, and Arunagirinathar, have composed hymns celebrating the temple. In the ancient work Cilappatikaram, the place is mentioned by the name Neduvelkundru.

The temple is also the subject of a popular composition by Muthuswami Dīkshitar, Arthanārishvaram, set in the raga Kumudakriya.

Important renovations were made during the reigns of the Chola, Pandya and Nayak kings, and by a British colonial officer, Davis, whose image can be found in the Mukkoottu Vinayaka temple.

The temple is maintained and administered by the Hindu Religious and Charitable Endowments Department of the Government of Tamil Nadu.

=== Legends ===
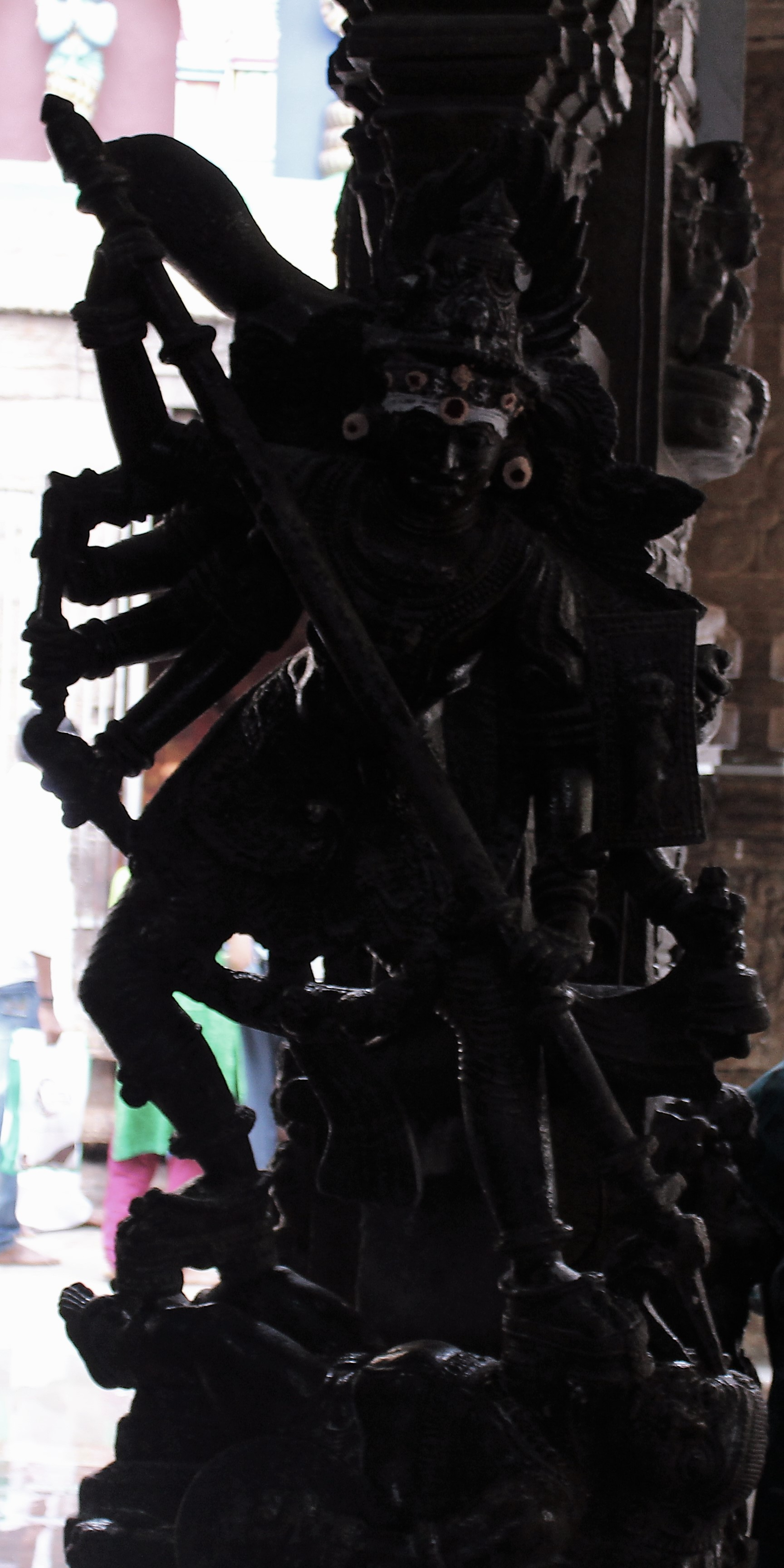
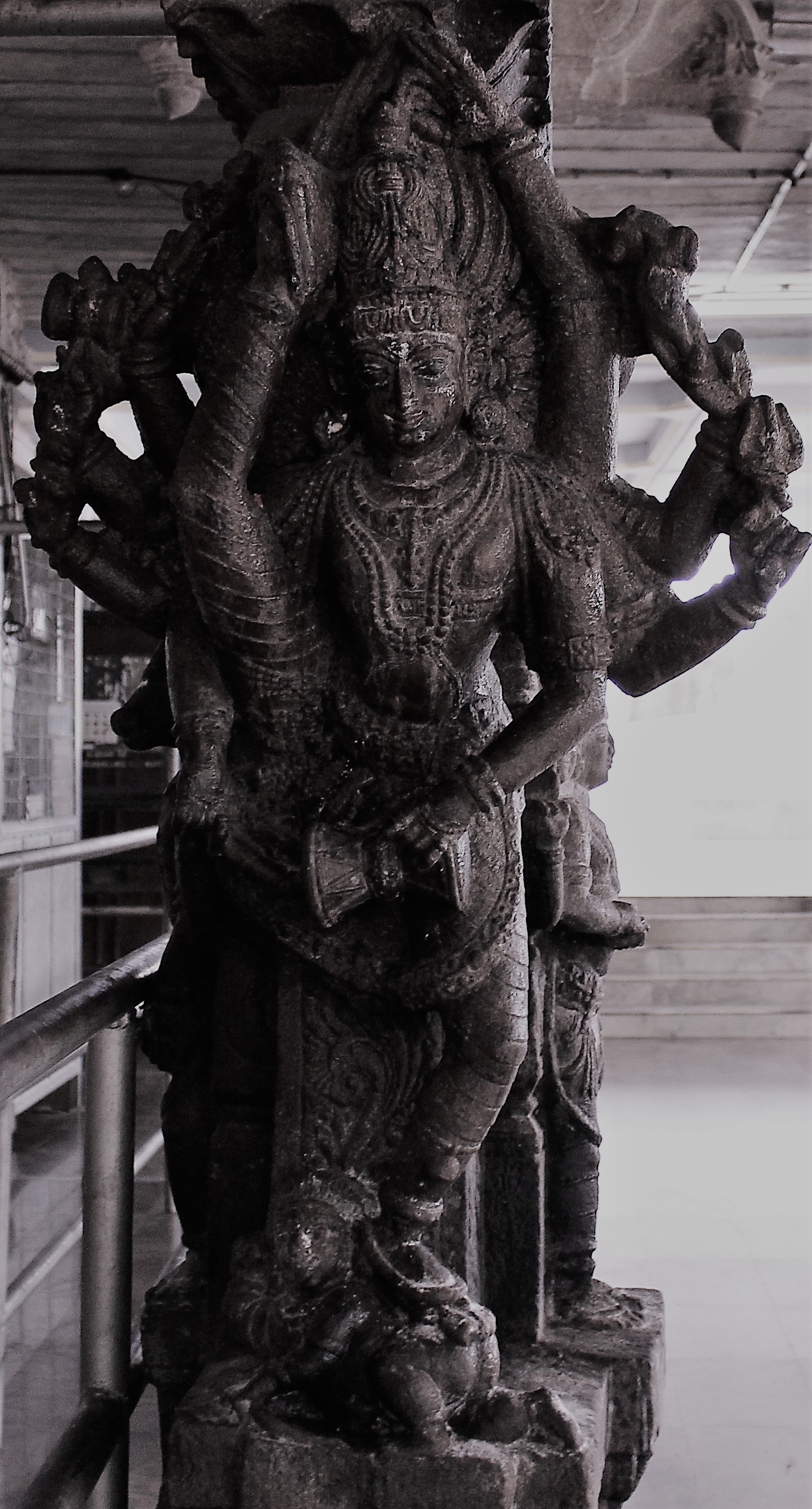
Images of the sculptures in the temple complex

It is believed that Adi Kesava Perumāl, a form of Vishnu enshrined here, instructed Parvati on the Kedara Gowri Vratam, which she performed to unite with Shiva as Ardhanareeswarar.

Once Brahma, Indra and the sage Bhringi went to Kailash to worship Shiva. Everyone first paid their respects to Parvati and then proceeded to Shiva. However, Bhringi directly marched to Shiva. Parvati, annoyed by his act, sucked the flesh from the sage's body to stop him proceeded. Shiva blessed Bhringi with a third leg, to counter Parvati's curse. With her austerities, Parvati appeased Shiva to grant position in his body, thus leading to the half-male, half-female manifestation as Ardhanareeswarar.

Another legend states that there was a battle between the serpent Adishesha and the wind-god Vayu for superiority. The sages set a challenge that Adishesha had to cling to Mount Meru and Vayu has to release him by his power. Adishesha succeeded. Vayu, out of anger, stopped the airflow in the world; as a result all living beings fainted. The sages convinced Vayu to release his hold. By the sudden release of air by Vayu lead the top of the mountain with the head of Adisesha, thrown into earth on three places with flesh and blood and making it red and thus the name Chengodu. There is a 60 ft long snake carved on the hill, and hence the name as Nagamalai. Sambandar composed the Tiruneelakandapathigam here, to help rid fellow travellers of an affliction. Saint Arunagirinathar has also composed Tirupuggal on Murugan here.

== Margatha Lingam ==
In this temple, Emerald Lingam is established.

Margatha Linga darshan takes place solely in the early mornings of the margali month between 3:30 and 7 am and during the daily Ucchi Kala Poojai.

== Architecture ==
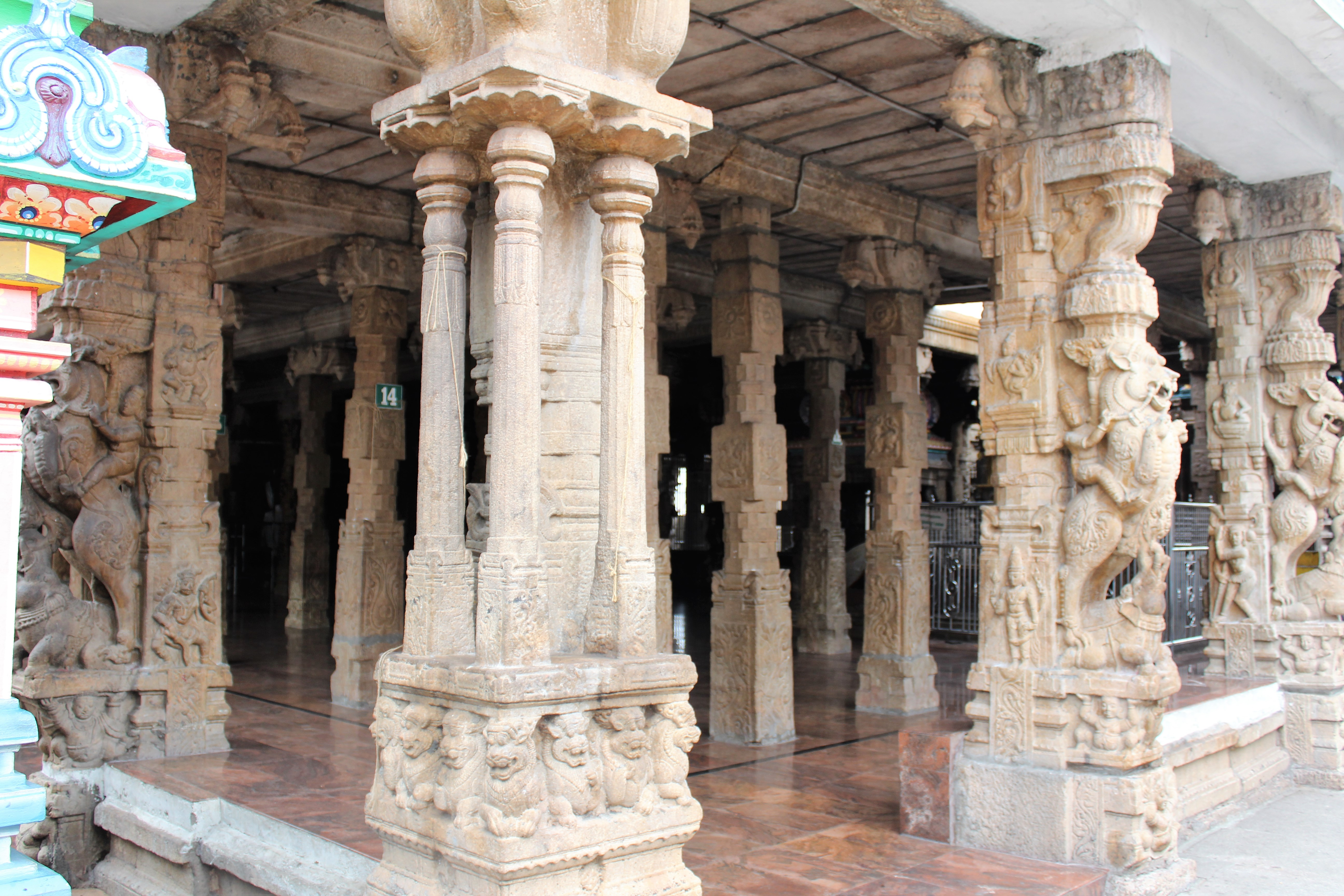
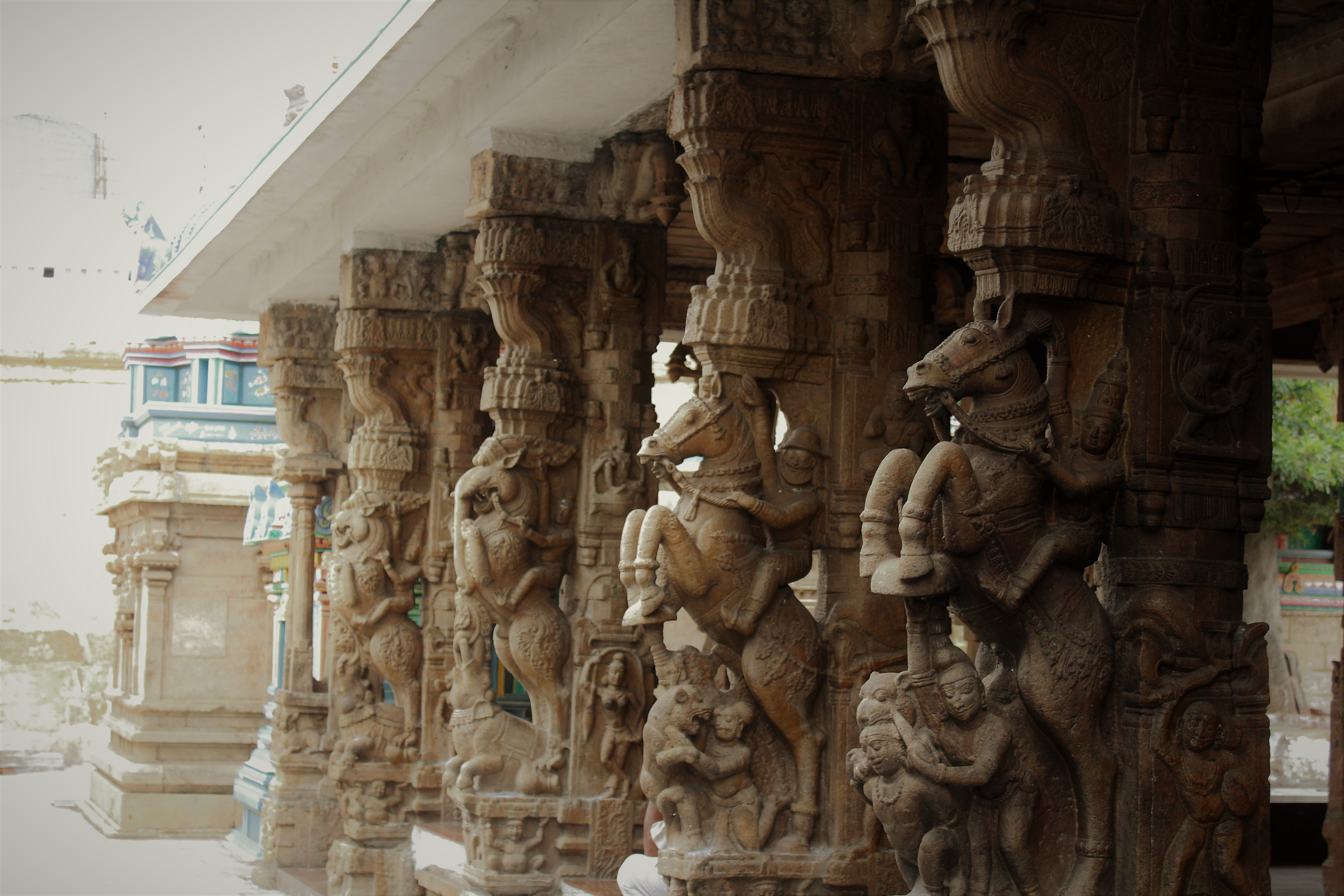
Images of the sculptures in the temple complex

The sacred hill is about 650 ft. high, and a climb of 1156 steps leads worshippers to the temple at its peak. The hill is called 'Nagagiri' in the Thevaram hymns and is also known by many other names like Chemmalai, Panimalai, Nandimalai, Uragaverpu. The hill contains about 350 acres of land, which lies 2000 ft about sea level.

On top of the hill, the main gopuram (Tower) with 5 tiers is on the north side of the hill. The compound wall of the temple is 260 feet length east to west and 170 feet length north to south.

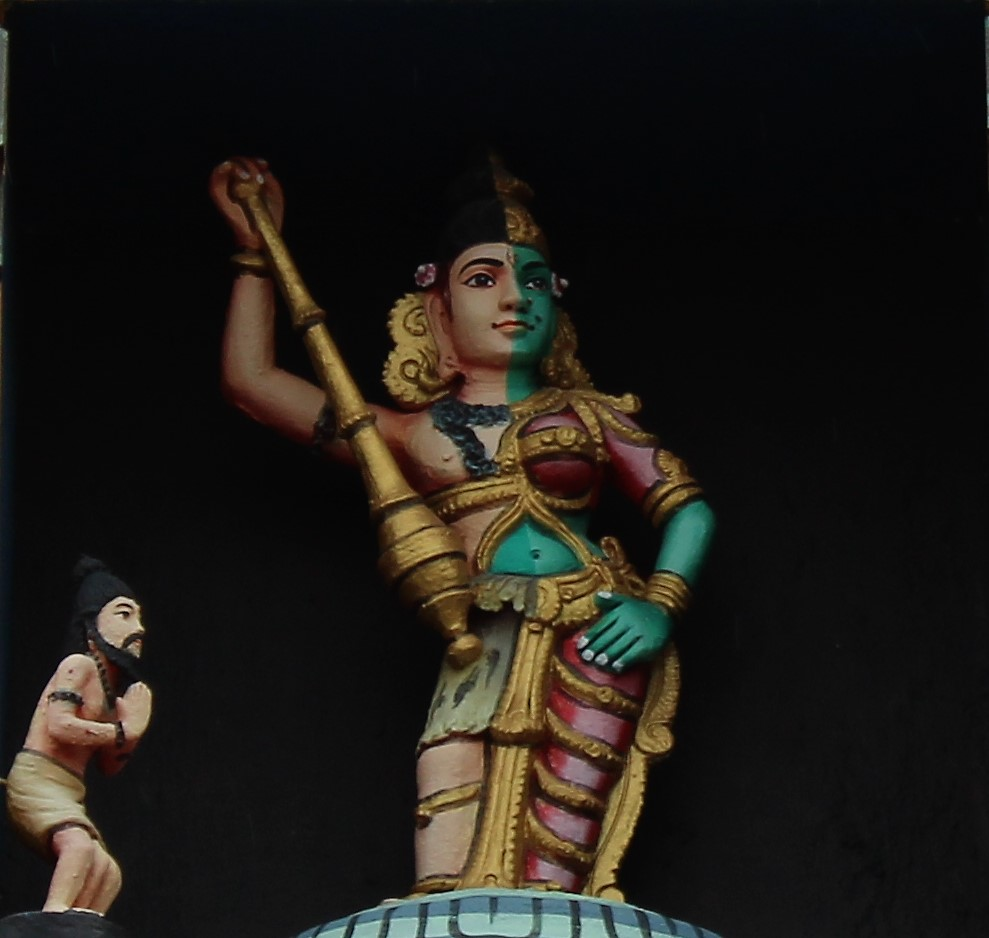
The main deity Ardhanareeswarar depicts Shiva as half male and half female (Parvati)

The main shrine is for Shiva known as Maathoru Paagar and the Ambal his consort is known Baagampiriyaalammai. The image of the main deity is 6 feet in height, the right half of the image as male and left half of the image as female. Hence the main deity is also known as Ardhanareeswarar.

Murugan known as Chengottu Velar is located on a flat surface atop the hill. This Chengottu Velar shrine is on the back side of the main sanctum sanctorum. The Theertham in this temple is called Sangu Theertham. Although the sanctum faces the West, entrance to it is from the South. There is a water spring at the foot of the image, which is said to have been divinely manifested "Uli Padaa Uruvam" ('sculptured without tools'), also known to be Navabashana type. There are many mandapams on the way for people who alight steps to take rest. The sculptures found in the mandapam in front of the Chengottu Velar shrine are of intricate designs and workmanship. "Artha Jaama Pooja" the late night worship service is considered to be of importance in this shetram. New moon days are also considered to be special events. The annual festival is celebrated in the Tamil month of Vaikasi. There is a shrine for Adikesava in the temple.

Along the path are 11 mandapams, providing shelter to pilgrims climbing up the hill. The first is the Senguntha Mudaliyar Mandapam, then the Kālathi Swamigal Mandapam, Thirumudiyar Mandapam and Thailee Mandapam.

One of the 64 manifestations of Shiva, representing the unity of Shiva and Parvati, is enshrined in this revered hill temple, accessible by a motorable road.

Ancient walls, mandapams and sculptured pillars (now in a state of disrepair) add to the awe that this temple perpetuates, on top of the hill was built by Vijaya Nagar Kings.The motorway and the renovated Rajagopuram are of recent origin. True to the name Nagagiri, there is a 60 ft (18 m) long snake carved on the hill.

Although the sanctum faces the West, entrance to it is from the South. A majestic image of Ardanareeshwarar adorns the sanctum. There is a water spring at the foot of the image which is said to have been divinely manifested (Uli Padaa Uruvam). There are inscriptions here from the times of Parantaka Chola, Gangaikonda Chola, the Vijayanagar and the Nayak Kings.

Sengunthar Mandapam	Kālathi Swamigal Mandapam	Thirumudiyar Mandapam	Thailee Mandapam
Sengunthar Chinna Mudaliyar Mandapam	Kodi Archanai Mandapam	Singhathoon Mandapam	ArupadhampadiNadar Mandapam
Chetti Gounder Mandapam	Thevaradiyar Mandapam	Ilaippatri Mandapam	Goupra Vayil Mandapam

=== Arupatham Padi ===
Along the path are 60 steps called the Arubadam Padi (அறுபதாம் படி), which are considered to have special significance, and are mentioned by Arunagirināthar.

=== Ucchi sivalingam ===
The Ucchi Pillaiyar shrine is found about 425 feet further up and is dedicated to Ganesha and to the lingam form of Shiva. On the west of it lies a stone called Varadikal, Maladi kal, or Vandhya Paatana Sikara. Couples offer worship at this shrine in the hope of being blessed with a child.

தத்வ நாற்பத் தெட்டு நாற்பத் தெட்டு மேற்றுத் திடமேவும்
தர்க்க சாத்ரத் தக்க மார்க்கச் சத்ய வாக்யப் பெருமாளே

=== Gopuram ===
The north facing, 84.5 ft tall Thirumalai Gopuram was built by Krishna Devarayar in 1512 and the basement (kalkarar) was built during the reign of Sadāsiva Mahārāyar. The 84.5 feet tall Majestic Rajagopuram of this hill temple faces north and its five stages contain fine pieces of embossed figures.

=== Theertham ===
Tiruchengode, one of the most important religious places in South India, is said to have 108 Theerthangal or water bodies.

Ganapathi Theertham	Shiva Theertham	Shakthi Theertham	Deva Theertham	Kumara Theertham	Ammaiyappar Theertham	Pāpanāsam Theertham
Bhairavar Theertham	Nāga Theertham	Shanmuga Theertham	Soorya Theertham	Siddhar Mooligai Theertham	Kanniyar Theertham	Chandra Pushkarani Theertham

Of these, the Ammaiyappar Theertham is the most important one, as it is found at the feet of Arthanareeswarar.

== Festivals ==
The temple is counted as one of the temples built on the banks of River Kaveri. The most important festival is the annual chariot festival of the Sengottuvelavar temple, which occurs for 15 days in the month of Vaikāsi. The special feature of the festival is that four separate chariots are used to carry the processional deities through the streets. The first chariot carries Ganesha, the second Sengottuvelavar (Murugan), the third is used for Arthanāreeshwara and the last for Adikeshava Perumāl (Vishnu). These chariots are also of considerable historic importance: the largest, that of Arthanāreeshwara was donated to the temple by Nagamalai Gounder in 1699, the chariot of Sengothuvevar was donated by Chennaraja Chikendar in 1628 and the remaining two were made by Kondabhupathi, the ruler of Kongunādu, in 1628.

=== Girivalam ===
Girivalam is the practice of circumambulating the sacred hill by foot, which is performed by large crowds on full-moon days. The route around the hill is about 7 km long and takes about 1.5 hours to cover the distance.

Festival month	Festival name
Chithirai	Chithra Paurnami
Vaikāsi	Badrakali Amman Kovil Thiruvizha and Vaikāsi Ther-Thiruvizhala
Aani	Natarajar Thirumanjanam
Aavani	Vinayaka Chathurthi
Purattasi	Manikovil Kedara Gowri Viratham and Navarathiri
Ippasi	Periya Mariamman Kovil Thiruvizha and Kanda Sashti
Karthikai	Karthikai Deepam
Margazhi	Aarudra Darisanam
Thai	Padi Thiruvizha
Masi	Māsimāgam Vizha and Sivarāthri
Panguni	Uthira Vizha
