= Nattatreeswarar Temple =

Hindu temple in Tamil Nadu, India

Nattātreeswarar Temple

Religion
- Affiliation: Hinduism
- District: Erode
- Deity: Agastheeswarar, Shiva
- Festival: Aadi Perukku

Location
- Location: Kangeyampalayam, Karur Road, Erode
- State: Tamil Nadu
- Country: India
- Interactive map of Nattātreeswarar Temple
- Coordinates: 11.2741784°N 77.8005477°E

Architecture
- Type: South Indian

Nattadreeswarar Temple (Nattātreeswarar) is a Hindu temple dedicated to Lord Shiva. It is located on a hillock island within River Kaveri, near Erode, off the Erode-Karur Highway., halfway between Kudagu and Bay of Bengal at Kaveripoompattinam.

== Legend ==
To get rid of any kind of Dhosam, Agasthiar made a lingam out of sand and placed it on the hillock in the middle of the river Cauvery. The Lingam is garlanded with his Rudhratcha Malai and sat in deep meditation.

It was believed that meditation would be disturbed at the dawn of the new year. On the first day of Chithirai – Tamil New Year's Day – Agasthiar was disturbed from his meditation and he tried to remove his Rudhratcha Malai from the Lingam. Then he heard the holy voice of Shiva asking him not to disturb the site and telling him that he went there not only to bless him alone but also his devotees and whoever goes there and worships him.

Thus Lord Shiva established himself on the hillock.

Later Agasthiar went to the south and finished his assigned work. He prepared an herbal tablet. On consuming the tablet he could present himself in any place he wanted to go. Using such power he came again to the hillock where he was welcomed and blessed by Lord Muruga.

== History ==
In the 10th century, Chola kings constructed the temple and dedicated it to Agastheeswarar. The Athee tree located inside the temple is said by believers to be 3000 years old. Devotees throng this temple in thousands on Tamil New Year's Day and offer prayers to Him for His blessings.
