= Kumaravayalur =

Indian village

Coordinates: 10°50′N 78°37′E

Kumaravayalur is a village in Tiruchirappalli district of the Indian state of Tamil Nadu. The village is situated 9 kilometers from the heart of Tiruchirappalli city and is home to the Subramanya Swamy temple.

It is 357 kilometers from the state capital, Chennai and the primary local language is Tamil. The closest postal head office is located in Somarasampattai, 2 kilometers away. It is served by the Mekkudi and Muttarasasanallur railway stations, with the nearest major railway station located 8 kilometers away in Tiruchchirapalli.
