= Vennaimalai =

- Village
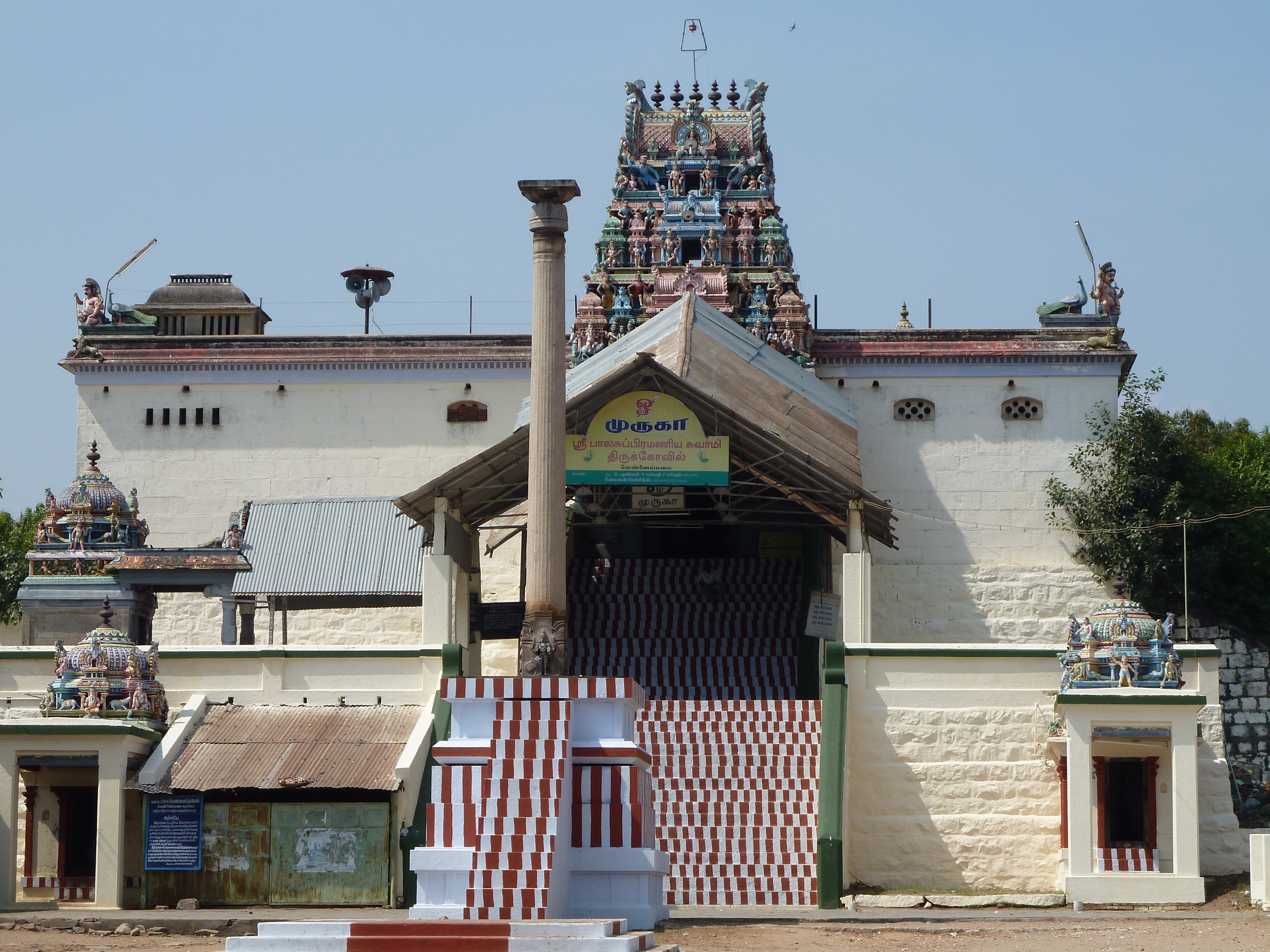
- Balasubramaniyaswamy Temple

- Location in Tamil Nadu, India Vennaimalai (India)
- Coordinates: 10°59′32.8″N 78°04′27.0″E
- Country: India
- State: Tamil Nadu
- District: Karur

Languages
  - Official: Tamil
- Time zone: UTC+5:30 (IST)

Vennaimalai is a village of Karur District located near Karur and Tiruchirappalli, in the state of Tamil Nadu, India. It is one of the residential area in Karur District and is known for Balasubramaniyaswamy Temple.

== Education ==
Bharani Park and Cheran Matriculation are two schools located near Vennamalai. Also the Kongu Arts and Science College is located near this area.

== Transport ==
Vennaimalai has frequent buses and mini-buses from Karur town. The nearest railway station is located in Karur.
