= J.Prabu =

J. Prabu
- Born: J. Prabu; 7 July 1986 (age 39); Erode, Tamil Nadu, India
- Other name: CJP
- Occupations: Businessman, director
- Years active: 2009–present

J. Prabu (born 7 July 1986), is an Indian actor and director. His filmography includes the critically acclaimed blockbusters Marmakaadu, Kandavudan, Gobichettypalayam and Thooya as well as the commercially successful film Kandavudan. He is the son of K. Jaganathan. He has won a first place for his performance in Dance in 2011.

== Acting career ==
=== Early career: 2009–10 ===
Following his upbringing as the friend of a noted director, J. Prabu debuted under the direction of his arima E. Abdulla in the Kandavudan with fellow debutant, Sherin. Upon release, the film fetched up big reviews and was a blockbuster, following the story of his character, Prabu.

But J. Prabu's breakthrough film was in his brother J. Sridhar.

== Personal life ==
=== Family ===
J. Prabu was born to K. Jaganathan as ShankarGanesh. He finished MBA and entered acting.

== Filmography ==
Year	Film	Role	Notes
2011	Kandavudan	Prabu	
2012	Thooya	Prabu	
2013	HERBALIFE	Business	
2017	AaramThinai	Story Discussion	
