= Thanthai Periyar Government Headquarters Hospital, Erode =

Hospital in Tamil Nadu, India

Thanthai Periyar Government Hospital is a public health care facility situated in Erode, Tamil Nadu. Also known as Government Headquarters Hospital (GHQH)-Erode is a District Headquarters Hospital. It is located at the center of the city, off the arterial road connecting Erode Junction with Central Bus Terminus, Erode.

== History ==
The Hospital was originally functioning near the Abdul Gani Textile Market in Panneerselvam Park, which was then shifted to the present location in 1955. During that, Periyar E. V. Ramasamy sponsored a share for this hospital. It is a 700 bedded Tertiary care hospital with 75 medical officers, serving this region.

In 2019, the Government of Tamil Nadu announced that this hospital will be upgraded as Multi Super Speciality Hospital providing all the tertiary care facilities.

A B+G+8 storeyed additional building for the super speciality hospital has been constructed at a cost of Rs.80.81 Crores along with the appointment of 20 new medical officers and several other staffs.

In April 2020, during the 2020 coronavirus pandemic in Tamil Nadu this hospital has been notified as Corona speciality hospital for treating Covid-19 cases, apart from the earlier notified Erode Medical College Hospital.

== See also ==
- Govt. Erode Medical College & Hospital (GEMCH)
