= Nandha Engineering College =

College in Tamil Nadu, India

- Motto: Learn Serve Succeed
- Type: Private
- Established: 2001
- Academic affiliations: Anna University, Chennai
- Chairman: Thiru. V. Shanmugan
- Faculty: 175
- Students: 4000
- Location: Pedundurai, Erode, Tamil Nadu, India
- Campus: 25 acres (0.1 km^{2})
- Website: www.nandhaengg.org

The Nandha Engineering College is an autonomous institution located at Erode - Perundurai, Main Road, Erode in the Erode district of Tamil Nadu in India. It is accredited by NAAC and NBA. It was founded by Nandha Institutions in 2001. Its purpose is the provision of technical education at undergraduate and postgraduate levels.

== Admissions ==
Nandha Engineering College is an autonomous institution from 8 March 2013. The admissions are Based on Engineering counseling conducted by Anna university Chennai.

== Academics ==
The institute has several departments, student community, technical support staff and an administration. The various departments in the institute are

- Engineering
  - Civil Engineering
  - Computer Science & Engineering [Both U.G & P.G]
  - Electrical and Electronics Engineering [Both U.G & P.G]
  - Electronics and Communications Engineering [Both U.G & P.G]
  - Mechanical Engineering [Both U.G & P.G]
  - Information Technology
  - Electronics and Instrumentation Engineering
  - Agricultural Engineering
  - Chemical Engineering
- Science and Humanities
  - Management Studies
  - Master of Computer Applications

== Campus ==
=== Location ===
Nandha Engineering college is 10 km (6.2 mi) away from Erode Railway station and 80 km (50 mi) from Coimbatore Airport

=== Academic buildings ===
The academic zone of the institute includes the seven buildings, separate laboratories, auditorium with an accommodation of 1000 students at a time, an open-air auditorium called Nandha Square, a Conference hall and the library. The three-storey library with internet facility has a subscription of over 100 international journals and an IEEE Digital Library is also available with an elevator facility.

=== Residential hostels ===
Residential facilities are provided for students and staff on the campus. Separate hostels and mess For men and women are available. Each hostel is managed by an associate warden and each mess by a warden.

== Student life ==
Every classrooms are engaged with a projector with internet facility for learning out of box. 24hrs free WiFi facility and mainly campus is free of ragging

Apart from academics, students in the institute are engaged in a variety of extracurricular activities but not limited to participation in National Cadet Corps, National Service Scheme, Red Ribbon Club, Youth Red Cross, Rotaract Club trekking, literary clubs, sports events, cultural club and two days are dedicated for college cultural and sports.

=== Flexible Faculty Selection ===
Nandha is the 1st institution in implementing FFS scheme in southern India for providing its students a sophisticated education that students can select their staff for their availed subjects. Project Based Learning is also provided for having practical knowledge and this is also left up to the student's own choice.

Annual events include a two-day technical event organized by the Electronics and Telecommunication Department; Radix, a technical event organized by the Electrical and Electronics Department; Techiez, a technical event organized by Computer Science department; TechCruise, and a technical event organized by Information Technology Department.
