= Vayalur Murugan Temple =

Coordinates: 10.82888°N 78.623153°E

- Vayalur Murugan Kovil
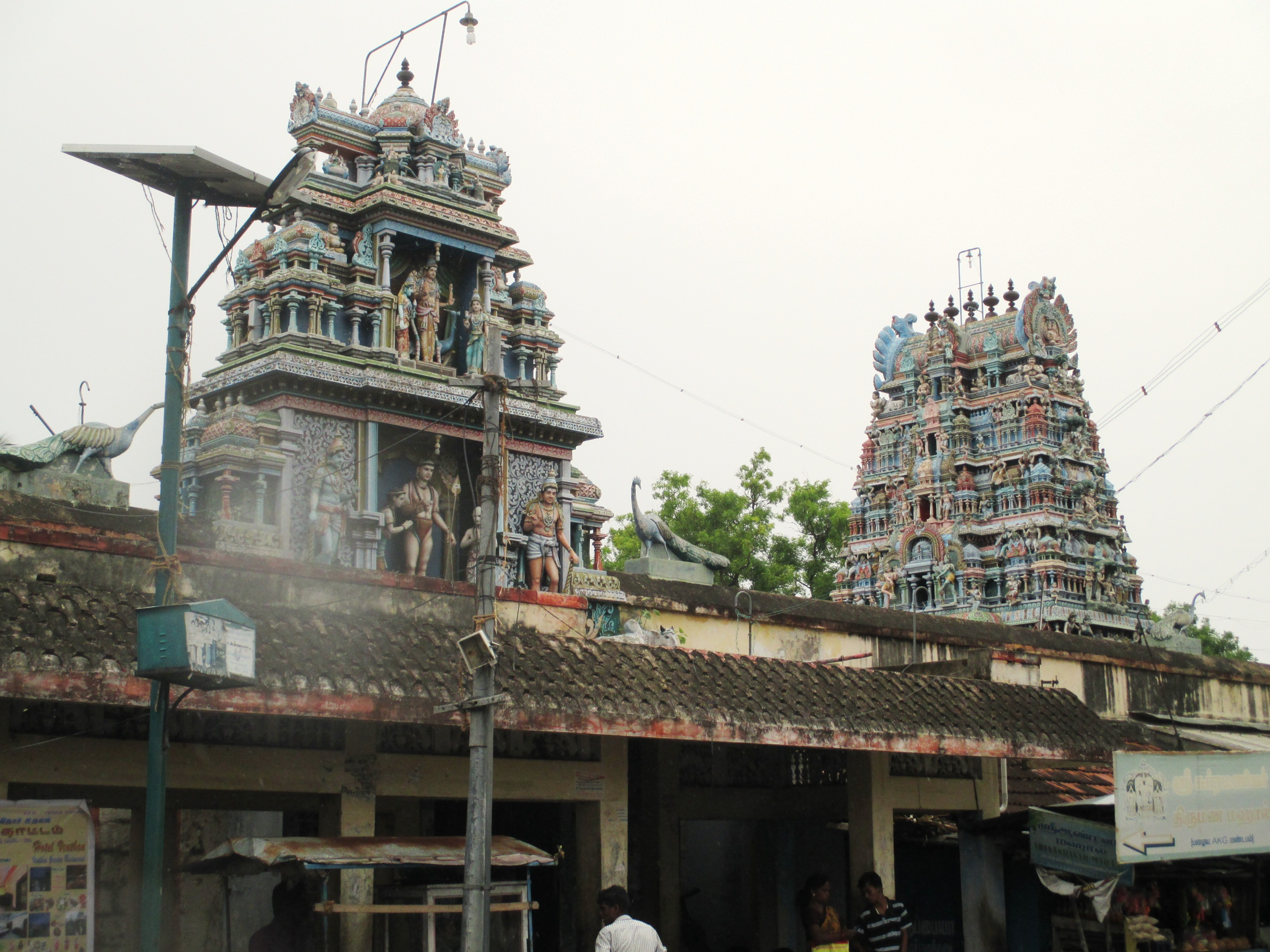

Religion
- Affiliation: Hinduism
- District: Tiruchirapalli
- Deity: Muruga

Location
- Location: Vayalur
- State: Tamil Nadu
- Country: India
- Interactive map of Vayalur Murugan Temple

Architecture
- Type: Dravidian
- Creator: Chola Dynasty
- Established: 9th century CE

The Vayalur Murugan Temple is a Hindu temple to Muruga, son of Shiva and Parvati, in the village of Kumaravayalur in Tiruchirapalli district, Tamil Nadu, India. The temple is believed to have been initiated during the period of Medieval Cholas during the 9th century. The temple is maintained and administered by the Hindu Religious and Charitable Endowments Department of the Government of Tamil Nadu. The presiding deity is Shiva and the temple is known for the Murugan shrine. The temple is associated with the Hindu writer Kirupanandha Variyar.

This temple is around 1200 years old and was built during the reign of Cholas. The temple was built by the Cholas in the 9th century CE. The temple is surrounded by lush green fields and located close to the Uyyakondan river. The gopuram of the temple was connected by the Hindu savant, Kirupanandha Variyar. The main deity in the temple is Muruga, it is behind the Moolavar Shiva Sannithy. The other Sannithys in this temple are Moolavar arulmigu Athi Nathar (Lord Shiva). Agni Theertham also known as Shakthi Theertham. According to a legend, Lord Muruga himself created this tank with his Velayudham. Sthala Vriksham: Vanni Maram (Vanni tree) is seen in the left side from the entrance of rajagopuram. The five-tiered rajagopuram is a modern addition. The presiding deity Shiva is represented in the form of Adinathar and his consort Adinayagi. The image of Muthukumaraswawmy is located in the first precinct behind the sanctum.
