= Lakkapuram =

Village in India

- Village
- Location in Tamil Nadu, India
- Coordinates: 11°18′16.0″N 77°45′22.9″E
- Country: India
- State: Tamil Nadu
- District: Erode

Population (2011)
  - Total: 9,739

Languages
  - Official: Tamil
- Time zone: UTC+5:30 (IST)
- PIN: 638 002
- Telephone code: 0424
- Vehicle registration: TN-33 (Erode East)
- Nearest city: Erode

Lakkapuram or Punjai Lakkapuram is a Village Panchayat located in Erode district, in the Indian state of Tamil Nadu. Lakkapuram village falls under Modakurichi taluk.

== Demographics ==
As of 2011 census, Lakkapuram village had a total population of 9,739, comprising 4,875 males and 4,864 females.Of the total population, 869 individuals were under the age of 6. The village has a literacy rate of 79.62% which is lower than the average literacy rate in Tamil Nadu.

== Lakkapuram Hill Temple ==
Lakkapuram Murugan Temple is one of the famous Hindu temples dedicated to Lord Muruga, located in the city of Erode, on Erode-Karur Highways. Temple named Shenbagamalai.

== Location ==
It is about 9 km from Erode Central Bus Terminus, 6 km from Erode Junction and 7 km from Erode Junction Bus station in Tamil Nadu, India. The village is located on the National Highway-381A, where it bisects Erode Ring Road.

Being situated in the southern periphery of Erode, the Erode Municipal Corporation has decided to expand its limit by merging Lakkapuram into its jurisdiction.

== Economy ==
The economy of this urban area is primarily based on power-looms and textile production.

A large number of loom units are present in this area, driving the textile trade.

Kongu Vellala Gounders, a community with a strong agricultural background in the surrounding villages, are also engaged in commerce in the town.

With the Regional Transport Office (RTO) just a kilometre from Lakkapuram, and expectations that the corporation area will be extended, real estate prices have soared.
