= Kokkarayanpet =

Kokkarayanpet Kokrayanpet
- village
- Country: India
- State: Tamil Nadu
- District: Namakkal

Languages
  - Official: Tamil
- Time zone: UTC+5:30 (IST)
- PIN: 638007
- Telephone code: 04288
- Coastline: 0 kilometres (0 mi)
- Nearest city: Erode
- Lok Sabha constituency: Erode

Kokkarayanpet is a village in Namakkal district of Tamil Nadu, India. According to the 2001 census it had a population of 5,628.
