= Thindal Murugan Temple =

Temple in Tamil Nadu, India

- Arulmigu Velayuthaswamy Thirukovil
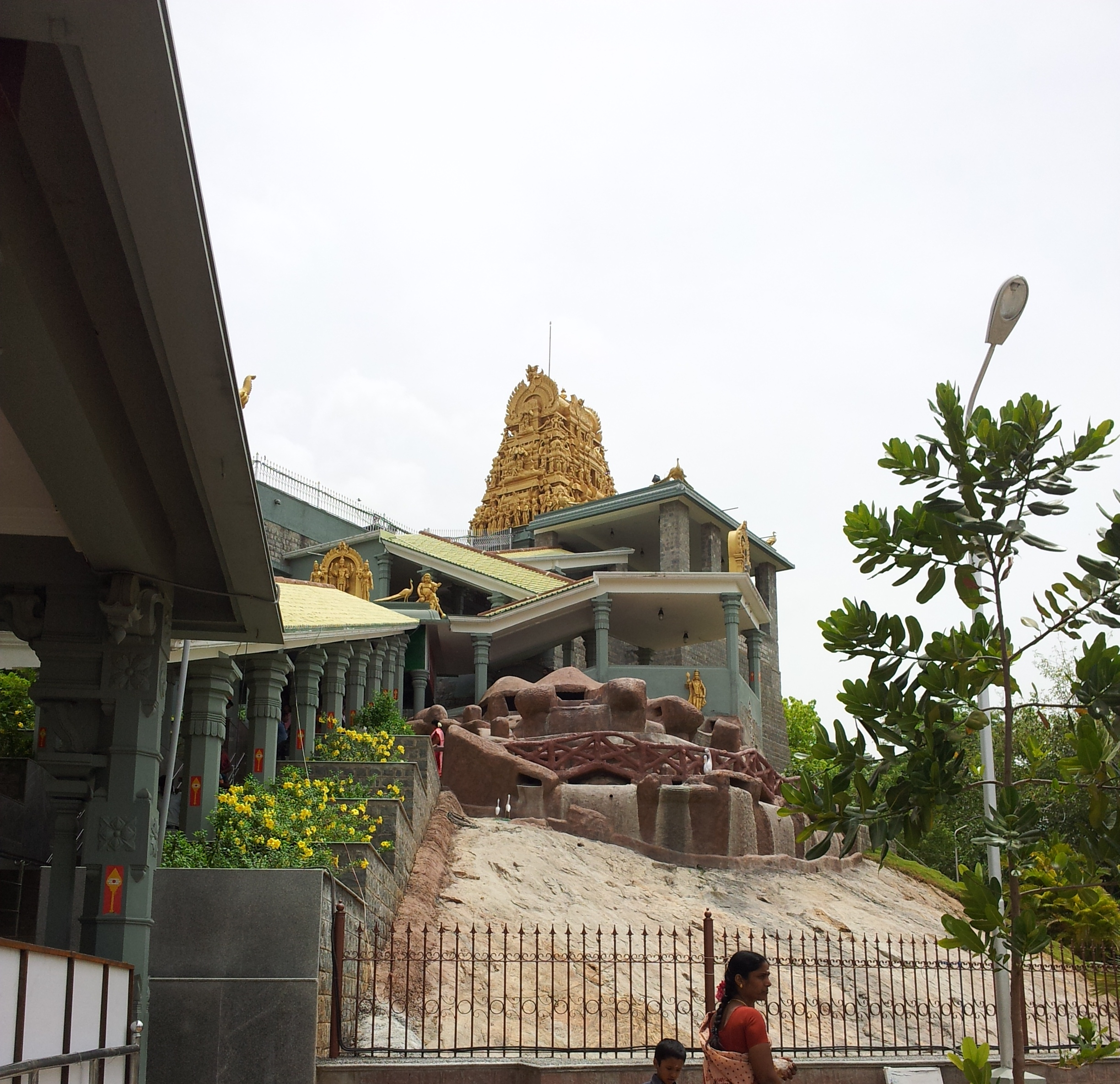

Religion
- Affiliation: Hinduism
- District: Erode
- Deity: Velayudhaswami

Location
- Location: Thindal, Erode
- State: Tamil Nadu
- Country: India
- Interactive map of Thindal Murugan Temple
- Coordinates: 11.3189799°N 77.6751482°E

Architecture
- Type: Dravidian

Website
- Thinal Murugan Temple

Arulmigu Velayuthaswamy Thirukovil, also known as the Thindalmalai Murugan Temple, is a Hindu temple dedicated to Lord Murugan, located on Thindalmalai hillock near Erode, Tamil Nadu, India. The primary deity is Sri Velayudhaswami (Murugan). The temple houses a golden chariot Temple Car, used to carry images of gods in ceremonial processions. It is about 7 km from Central Bus stand at Swastik Circle, 8 km from Erode Junction. The Temple is well connected to by local buses running in-between Erode Central Bus Terminus and Perundurai.
