= Murugan Temple, Kumaranmalai =

Murugan or Balathandayuthapaniswamy temple is a Hindu temple situated in the village of Kumaranmalai at a distance of 10 kilometres from Pudukkottai in the Pudukottai district in Tamil Nadu, India. The temple is dedicated to the Hindu god Murugan and is situated on a small hillock. The temple encompasses a sacred tank whose water is considered holy.

== Location ==
This temple is situated at Pudukottai-Karaiyur road, at a distance of 12 km.

== Presiding deity ==
Unlike the Muruga of Palani who is keeping his hands in the hip, the presiding deity of this temple, Muruga, also known as Balathandayuthapaniswamy is having his hands hung down. He does not have tonsured head. He is having tuft above the head, like a brahmin. The tirtta of the temple is Sangusunai Tirtta.

== History ==
For a devotee Palaniandavar, gave darshan here. A devotee known as Sethupathi used to go on pilgrimage to Palani every year taking Kāvadi. When he was 80, he found it difficult to take the kavadi. So, he could not able to proceed to Palani. At that time Palani Muruga, the presiding deity of Palani Murugan Temple appeared in his dream and told him that he would be coming over to Kumaramalai to satisfy him. He also told that there would be Vibhuti, Rudraksha and lemon. When Sethupathi went there he saw everything there. He planted a Vel and started worshipping it. In due course he consecrated a Muruga sculpture and named it as Balathandayuthapani. The Kumbhabhishekham was done to this temple by Pallavarayas.

== Specialities ==
During the bangle wearing ceremony, women came here to the artha mandapa. They are also offering the bangles to the Vel. By doing this they feel have children without difficulty. In the hill, if one draw feet and worship every good things will happen to them. Many devotees come to this temple by walk.

== Worshipping time ==
The temple is opened for worship from 6.00 a.m. to 12.00 P.M. and 4.00 p.m. to 8.00 p.m.

== Festivals ==
Vaikasi Visakam, Sashti, Karthikai, Somawara, Thaipposam, Panguni Uthiram are held in this temple. The latest Kumbhabhishekham was done on 19 March 1995.

== Bibliography ==
- Tourist Guide to Tamil Nadu. Sura Books. p. 96. ISBN 978-81-7478-177-2.
