= Balasubramaniyaswamy Temple =

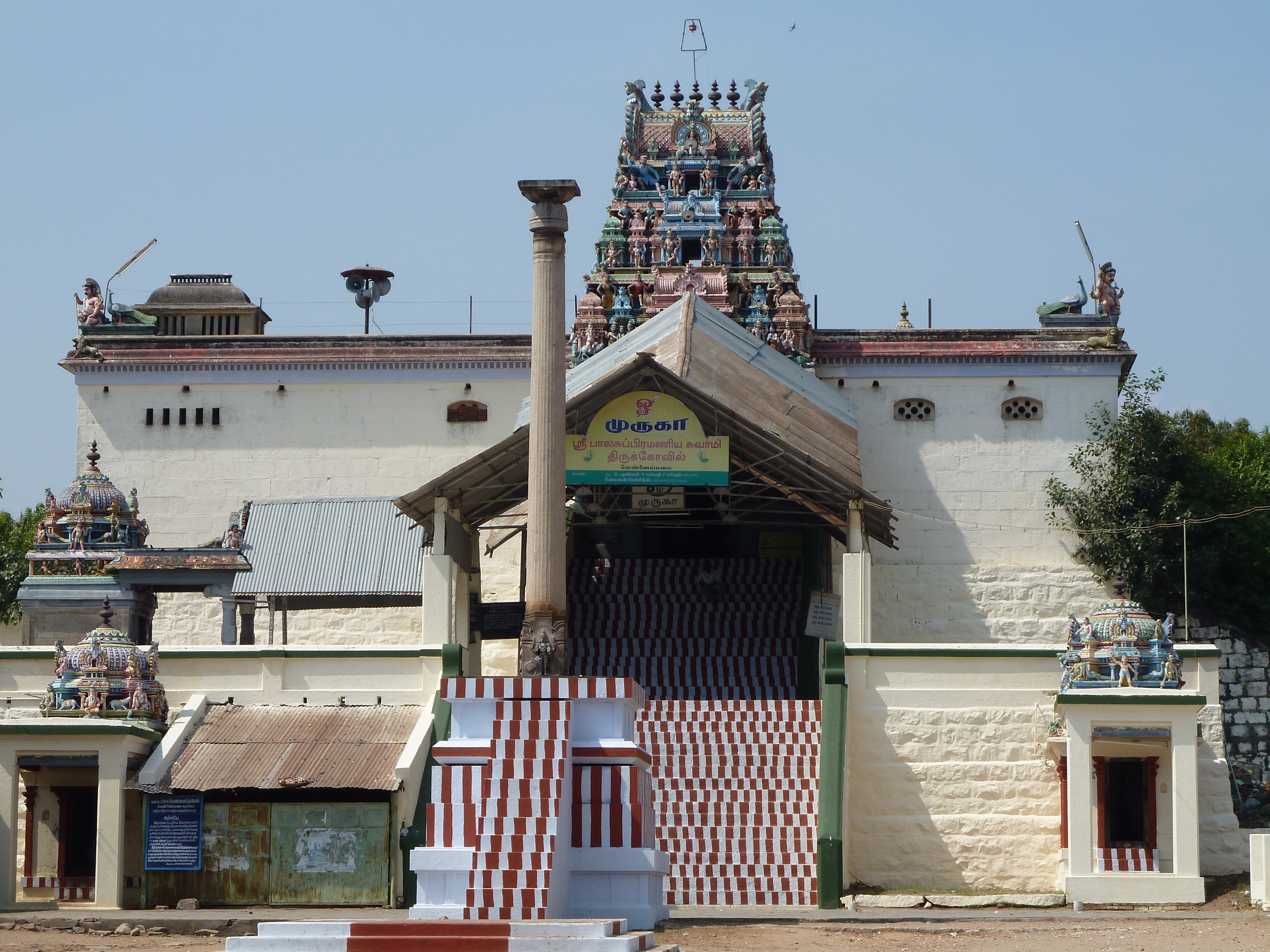

- Location in Tamil Nadu

Religion
- Affiliation: Hinduism
- District: Karur
- Deity: Balasubramaniyaswamy (Murugan)

Location
- Location: Vennaimalai
- State: Tamil Nadu
- Country: India
- Coordinates: 10°59′30″N 78°04′24″E

Architecture
- Type: Dravidian architecture

Balasubramaniyaswamy temple (also called Vennaimalai Murugan temple) in Vennaimalai, a village in the outskirts of Karur in Karur district in the South Indian state of Tamil Nadu, is dedicated to the Hindu god Murugan. Constructed in the Dravidian style of architecture, the temple is located in the Karur - Pugalur Road. The legend of the temple is associated with Kamadhenu taking up the duties of Hindu god of creation Brahma and creating the hill of butter named Vennaimalai.

The temple has an elevated structure, a three-tiered gateway tower, the gopuram, leading to the sanctum. The temple is open from 6:30 am – 12:00 pm and 5 - 8:30 pm. Four daily rituals and many yearly festivals are held at the temple, of which Panguni Uthiram festival celebrated during the Tamil month of Panguni (March - April), Thai Poosam during Thai (January - February) and Karthikai during November - December being the most prominent. The temple is maintained and administered by the Hindu Religious and Endowment Board of the Government of Tamil Nadu.

== Legend ==
As per Hindu legend, Brahma, the Hindu god of creation was very proud about his profession and Shiva wanted to teach him a lesson. Brahma was overloaded at one point and could not continue his profession. He realised his mistake and prayed to Shiva seeking relief. Shiva directed him to Vanjimalai to perform penance praying to Muruga. Kamadenu, the divine cow, took up the role of Brahma to create beings in earth. It is believed that the cow created a hill made of butter (called vennai in Tamil and the sacred tank with its milk. It was built by Thinnappa Chettiar, Karur.

== Architecture ==
The temple is located in Vennaimalai, in the outskirts of Karur in Karur district in Tamil Nadu on the road from Karur to Vennaimalai. The temple has an elevated structure climbed through a flight of steps. There is a three-tiered rajagopuram, the gateway tower leading to the sanctum. At the bottom of the hill there is a tall granite pillar which is axial to the sanctum. The sanctum houses the image of Balasubramaniyaswamy. In the north west shrine facing the sanctum, the images of Kasi Viswanathar and Visalakshi, the parents of Balasubramaniyaswamy are housed. There is a shrine of Vinayaga facing east in the foothills. The temple tank, Thenu theertham is located outside the temple In modern times, the Karur district administration has identified the temple as one of the prominent tourist attractions in the district.

== Festival and religious practices ==
The temple priests perform the pooja (rituals) during festivals and on a daily basis. The temple rituals are performed four times a day: Kalasandhi at 8:00 a.m., Uchikala poojai at 12:00 p.m., Sayarakshai at 6:00 p.m., and Arthajama Pooja at 8:15 p.m. Each ritual has three steps: alangaram (decoration), neivethanam (food offering) and deepa aradanai (waving of lamps) for the presiding deities. There are weekly, monthly and fortnightly rituals performed in the temple. The temple is open from 6:00 am – 12:00 pm and 5 - 8:30 pm on all days except during festive occasions when it has extended timings. The major festivals of the temple include the Panguni Uthiram festival celebrated during the Tamil month of Panguni (March - April), Thai Poosam during Thai (January - February) and Karthikai during November - December. The temple also offers Annadanam scheme from 2006, where lunch is served to the devotees everyday with the arrangements made by the Hindu Religious and Endowment Board.
