= Tiruchengode =

Tiruchengode Thirukodimadachenkunroor
- Municipality
- Tiruchengode, Namakkal (Tamil Nadu)
- Coordinates: 11.379000°N 77.894900°E
- Country: India
- State: Tamil Nadu
- District: Namakkal
- Elevation: 271 m (889 ft)

Population (2011)
  - Total: 95,335

Languages
  - Official: Tamil
- Time zone: UTC+5:30 (IST)
- PIN: 637(xxx)
- Telephone code: 91-(0)4288
- Vehicle registration: TN-34

Tiruchengode is a special grade municipality and town located in western part of southern Indian state of Tamil Nadu, in Namakkal district. It is the site of the Ardhanareeswarar Temple.

== Demographics ==
Religious census (2011)
Religion	Percent(%)
Hindu	95.88%
Muslim	2.95%
Christian	1.05%
Sikh	0.02%
Buddhist	0.0%
Jain	0.0%
Other	0.1%
No religion	0.0%

Approx. Religious census (2018)
Religion	Percent(%)
Hindu	82.30%
Muslim	8.93%
Christian	8.75%
Sikh	0.02%
Buddhist	0.0%
Jain	0.0%
Other	0.0%
No religion	0.0%

According to 2011 census, Tiruchengode had a population of 95,335 with a sex-ratio of 994 females for every 1,000 males, much above the national average of 929. A total of 8,901 were under the age of six, constituting 4,495 males and 4,406 females. Scheduled Castes and Scheduled Tribes accounted for 11.36% and .07% of the population respectively.

The average literacy of the town was 75.87%, compared to the national average of 72.99%.

The town had a total of 26508 households.

There were a total of 42,405 workers, comprising 329 cultivators, 686 main agricultural labourers, 1,279 in household industries, 38,804 other workers, 1,307 marginal workers, 7 marginal cultivators, 46 marginal agricultural labourers, 80 marginal workers in household industries and 1,174 other marginal workers.

As per the religious census of 2011, Tiruchengode had 95.88% Hindus, 2.95% Muslims, 1.05% Christians, 0.02% Sikhs, 0.0% Buddhists, 0.0% Jains, 0.1% following other religions and 0.0% following no religion or did not indicate any religious preference.

== Politics ==
Tiruchengode Assembly constituency (Constituency No. 96) is part of the Namakkal Lok Sabha constituency, following the 2008 delimitation (effective from the 2009 general elections). Prior to this, Tiruchengode was a separate lok sabha constituency.

== Notable people ==
- T.R. Sundaram Mudaliyar (16 July 1907 – 30 August 1963), Indian film actor, director, and producer more than 100 films; founder of the Salem-based film production company Modern Theatres Ltd

== See also ==
- Thirukodimaadachenkundrur
- Tiruchengode (Lok Sabha constituency)
