= Perundurai =

- Nickname: perunthora
- Perundurai, Tamil Nadu
- Coordinates: 11.274600°N 77.582700°E
- Country: India
- State: Tamil Nadu
- Region: Kongu Nadu
- District: Erode
- Metropolitan: Coimbatore
- Elevation: 303 m (994 ft)

Population (2001)
  - Total: 16,973

Languages
  - Official: Tamil
- Time zone: UTC+5:30 (IST)
- PIN: 638052
- Telephone code: 04294
- Vehicle registration: TN 56

Perundurai is a municipality in Erode district in the Indian state of Tamil Nadu. Perundurai served as a western entry to Erode city and became the important sub urb of Erode city. Perundurai has developed as an industrial center with SIPCOT Industrial Estate and SEZ Complex. It is the Asia's Second largest SIPCOT.

Perundurai has been proposed to be developed as a Satellite Town for Erode, as per Erode Master Plan-1996.

== Geography ==
Perundurai is located on National Highway 544, connecting Salem with Cochin. It is located 18 kilometres from Erode Central Bus Terminus via Perundurai Road, and 36 kilometres from Tiruppur and 80 kilometres from Coimbatore and Salem, 65 kilometres from Dharapuram and 32 kilometres from Kangayam, respectively.

== Demographics ==
As of 2001 India census, Perundurai had a population of 16,973. Females constitute 50% of the population. Perundurai has an average literacy rate of 72%, higher than the national average of 59.5%. Male literacy is 80%, and female literacy is 65%. In Perundurai, 9% of the population is under 6 years.

== Economy ==
Perundurai SIPCOT was established by Tamil Nadu in July, 2000, on around 2000 acres. The population increased in the neighbourhood because of textile industries relocating from Tirupur, Coimbatore and Erode city to Perundurai. SIPCOT acquired another 1,600 acres (6.5 km^{2}) in 2007. Parryware Roca started their manufacturing plant in 2006, their fourth in India. IRTT medical college and hospital run by Tamil Nadu State Transport Corporation is located there. The state government converted IRT medical college into the Government Erode Medical College and Hospital.

== Politics ==
Perundurai Constituency in Erode district is one of the 234 Assembly Constituency in Tamil Nadu. The most successful party in Perundurai Constituencyis AIADMK.

== Education ==
=== Medical College ===
- Government Erode Medical College
- Nandha Medical College & Hospital
- K M R College of Pharmacy

=== Engineering Colleges ===
- Kongu Engineering College
- Erode Sengunthar Engineering College
- Nandha Engineering College
- Surya Engineering College

Hindusthan Engineering College

=== Arts and Science College ===
- Kongu Arts and Science College
- Hindustan college of Arts
- Nandha Arts and Science College
- Maharaja college for Women
- Maharaja Engineering College for Women

=== Polytechnic College ===
- Konghu Velalar Polytechnic college Seenapuram Perundurai
- Government polytechnic college

== Infrastructure ==
The town hosts the Erode Rural DSP Office, Perundurai Police station, Court, and Subtreasury office. The town Panchayat Offices and Perundurai Taluk office are there. The weekly market operates on Sundays. The four theaters are COSMOS Cinemas A/C, Nallappas, Sri Murugan Cinemas, SAPPHIRE Cineplex (Outskirts of the town) and Mahalakshmi (Temporarily Closed).

== Health care ==
Government Erode Medical College

Kmc perundurai

Kongu hospital

Nandha medical college Hospital

== Transport ==
A bus stand reaches Erode, Coimbatore, Tirupur, and Salem.
