= Erode =

City in Tamil Nadu, India

- City
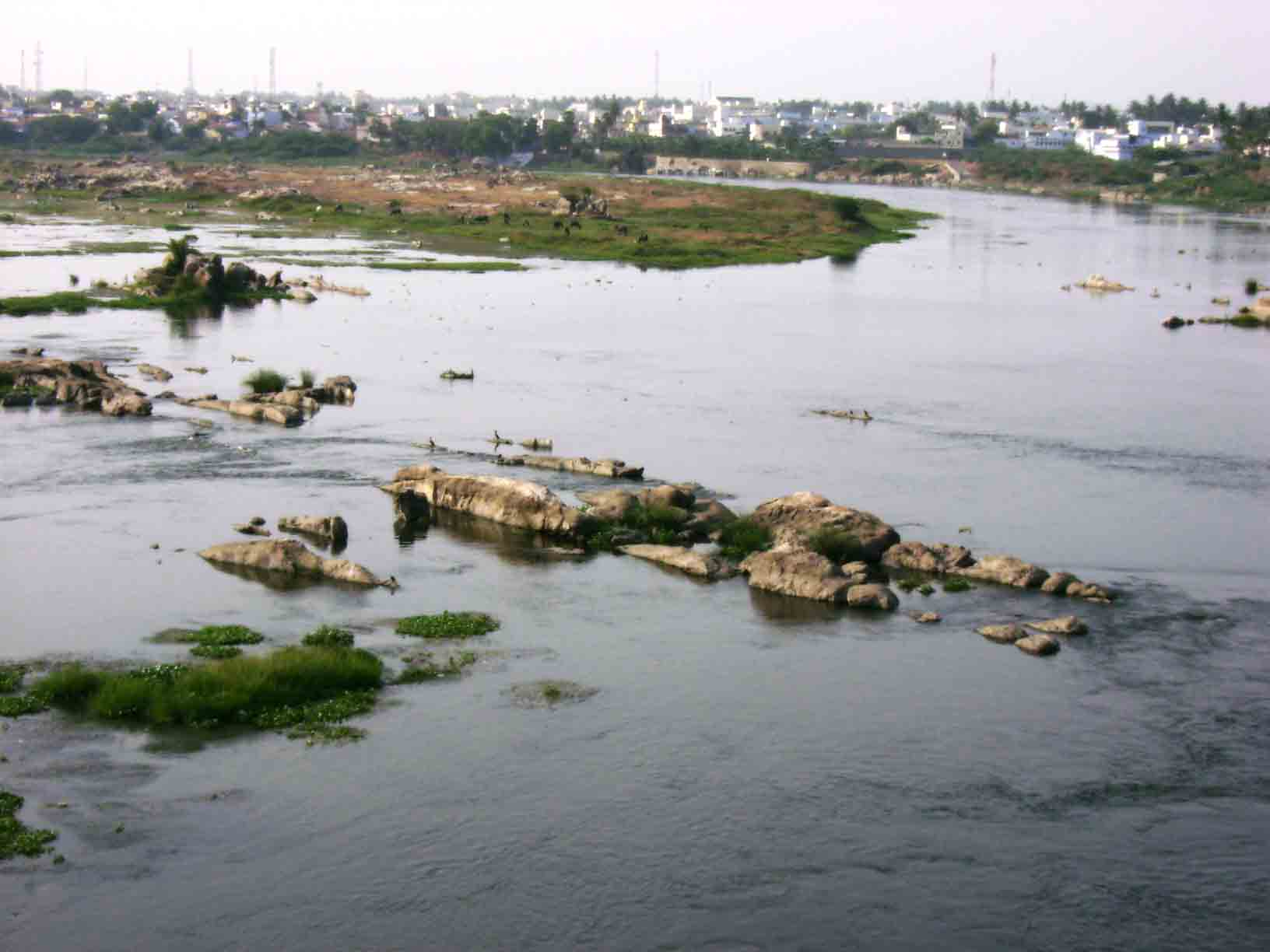
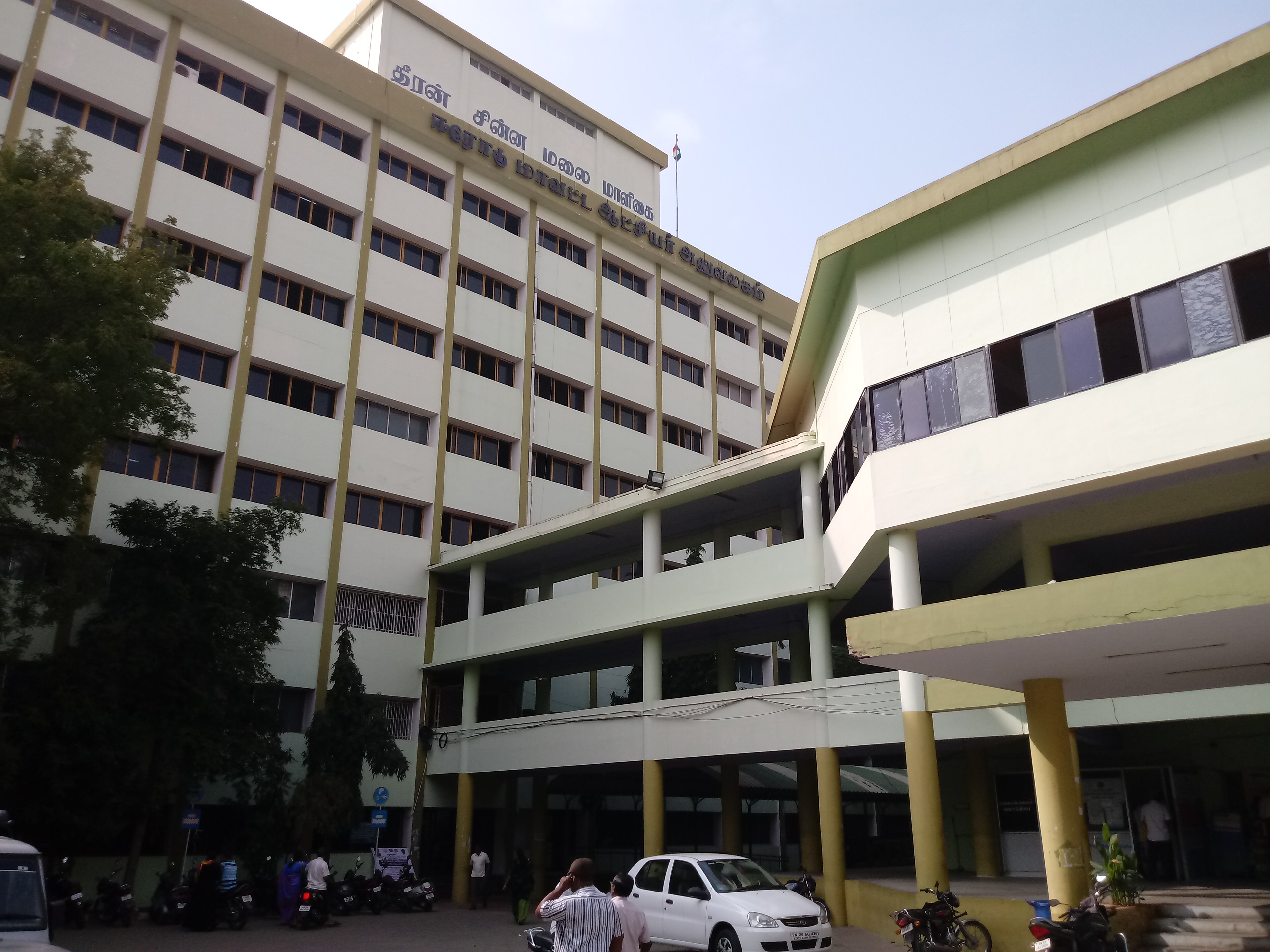
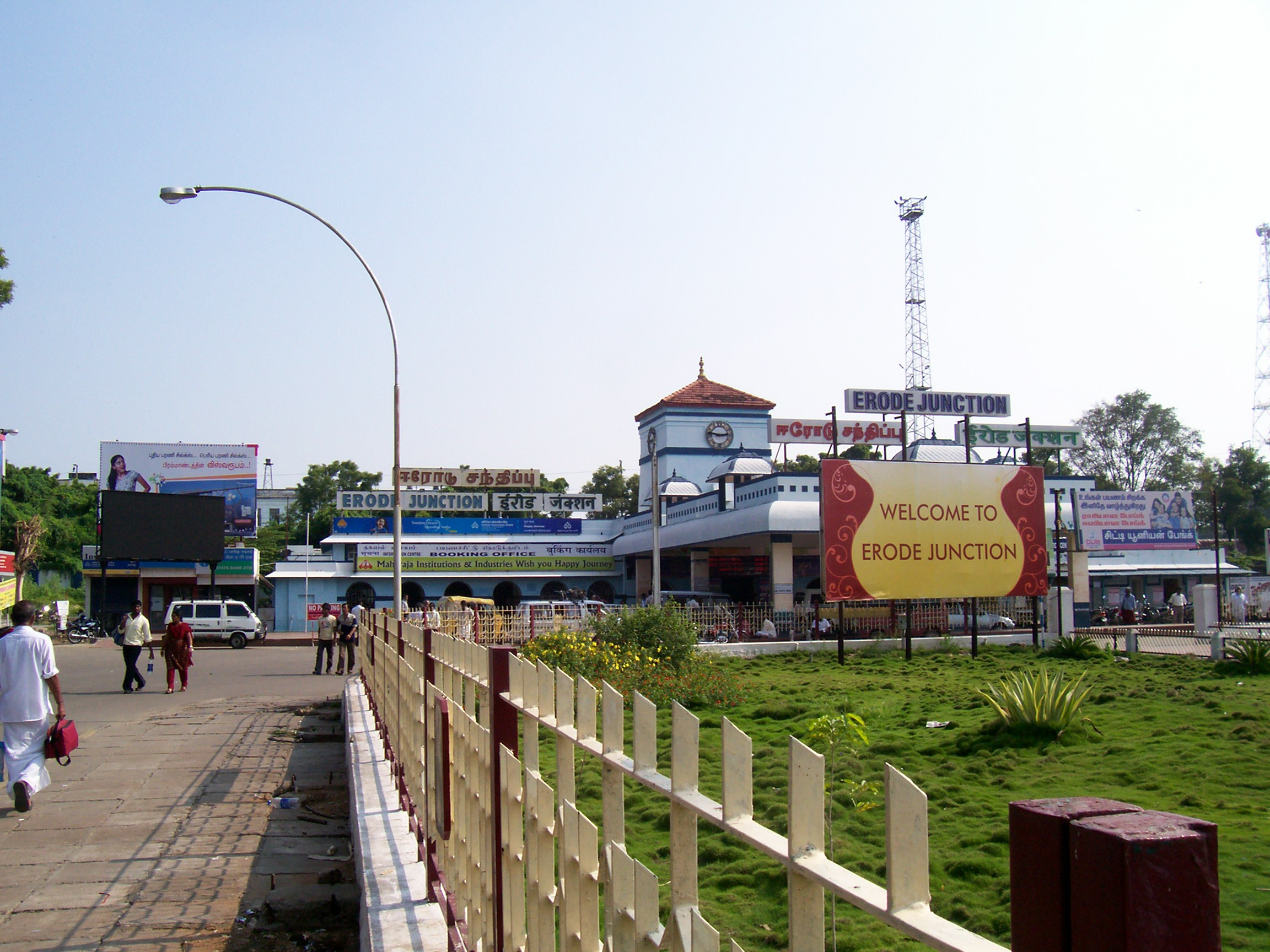
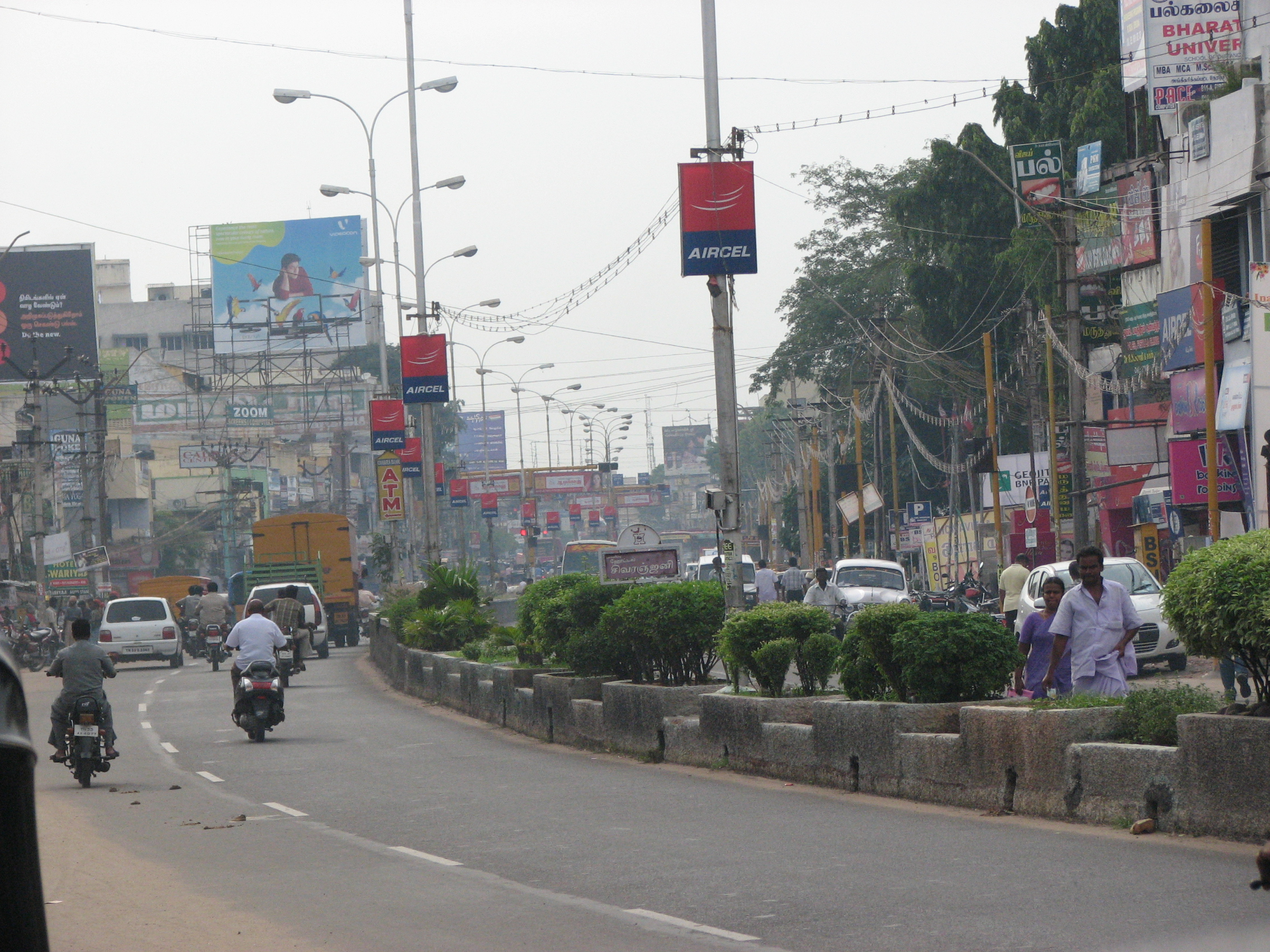
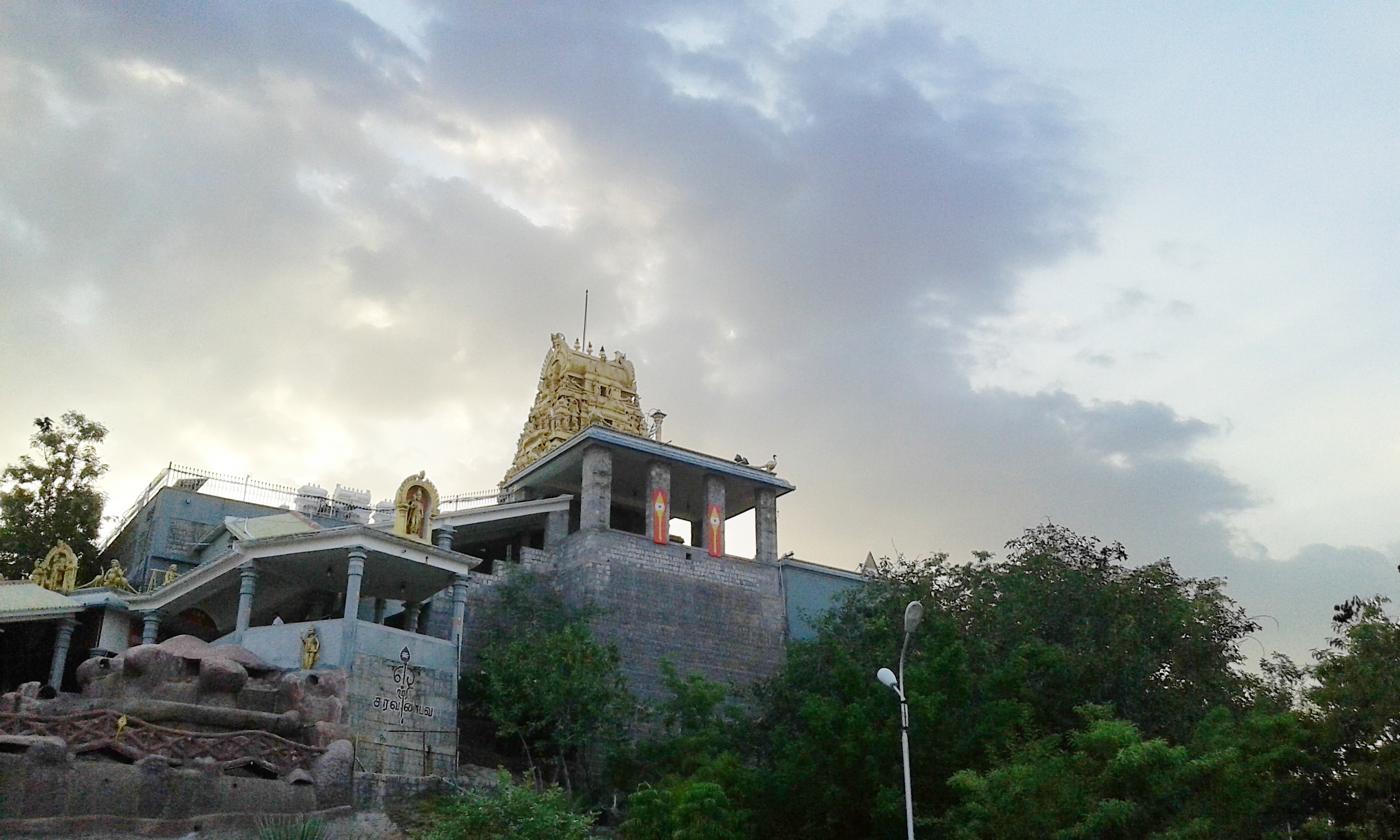
- From top, left to right: Kaveri river, District collectorate, Erode Junction railway station, Meenakshi Sundaranar Salai and Thindal Murugan Temple
- Nicknames: Turmeric city Textile city
- Location in Tamil Nadu, India
- Coordinates: 11°20′27.2″N 77°43′01.6″E
- Country: India
- State: Tamil Nadu
- District: Erode

Government
  - Type: Municipal Corporation
  - Body: Erode Municipal Corporation
  - Mayor: S. Nagarathinam (DMK)

Area
  - City: 109.52 km^{2} (42.29 sq mi)
- Elevation: 175.3 m (575 ft)

Population (2011)
  - City: 157,101
  - Rank: 7th in Tamil Nadu
  - Metro: 521,776

Languages
  - Official: Tamil, English
- Time zone: UTC+5:30 (IST)
- PIN: 6380xx
- Telephone code: 91 (424)
- Vehicle registration: TN 33 (East), TN 86 (West)
- GDP per capita (2020): US$7,653 (equivalent to $9,521 in 2025)
- Website: erodecorporation.gov.in

Erode (Tamil: [iːɾoːɽɯ]; īrōṭu) is a city in the Indian state of Tamil Nadu. It is located on the banks of the Kaveri river and is surrounded by the Western Ghats. It is the seventh largest urban agglomeration in Tamil Nadu. It is the administrative capital of Erode district and is administered by the Erode Municipal Corporation which was established in 2008.

Erode formed part of the Kongu Nadu region ruled by the Cheras during the Sangam period between the 1st and the 4th centuries CE. The medieval Cholas conquered the region in the 10th century CE. The region was ruled by Vijayanagara Empire in the 15th century followed by the Nayaks who introduced the Polygar system. In the later part of the 18th century, the it came under the Kingdom of Mysore and following the Anglo-Mysore Wars, the British East India Company annexed it to the Madras Presidency in 1799. The region played a prominent role in the second Poligar War (1801) when it was the area of operations of Dheeran Chinnamalai.

Post Indian Independence in 1947, Erode was part of Coimbatore district. It was established as the capital of the newly formed Erode district in 1979. It forms part of Erode Lok Sabha constituency that elects its member of parliament. The city is a major agricultural, industrial and educational hub. It is amongst the largest producers of turmeric in the state and Erode Turmeric is recognized as a Geographical Indication by the Government of India. The textile boom in the early 20th century and rapid growth due to industrialization has seen Erode becoming a major producer of handloom and knitwear.

== Etymology ==
There are two theories regarding the origin of the name Erode. It might have its origin in the Tamil phrase Eeru Odai meaning two streams based on the water courses Perumpallam and Pichaikaranpallam canals. Alternatively, it might have been derived from the Tamil phrase Eera Odu meaning 'wet skull', based on the temple of Shiva in the city and the mythology associated with it.

== History ==
During Sangam period, the region formed a part of the Kongu Nadu region ruled by Cheras and then by Kalabhras. The region came under the Pandyas around 590 CE. Afterward, it was ruled by Rashtrakutas and by Cholas from the 10th to early 13th century. Erode was annexed by Vijayanagara Empire in 1378 CE till 1559 CE. After the Vijayanagara Empire fell in the 17th century, the Madurai Nayaks established their state as an independent kingdom introducing the Palayakkarar system. Erode became a part of the Hindu Wodeyar-ruled Mysore Kingdom in the early 1700s CE before coming under the control of the British East India Company with Maharaja of Mysore still as a nominal ruler. Erode remained under British Colonial rule until the Indian independence in 1947.

== Climate ==
Erode has a semi-arid climate with hot to sweltering temperatures throughout the year and relatively low rainfall. Temperatures range from 27 to 36 °C (80–96 °F) with an average rainfall of 543 millimetres (21.4 in). Like the rest of Tamil Nadu, March to June are the hottest and December to January the mildest months of the year. Because the Southwest monsoon (June to August) brings scanty rainfall, the bulk of Erode's rainfall is received during the Northeast monsoon in October and November. The city covers an area of 8.44 km^{2} (3.26 sq mi).

Climate data for Erode (1991–2020)
Month	Jan	Feb	Mar	Apr	May	Jun	Jul	Aug	Sep	Oct	Nov	Dec	Year
Record high °C (°F)	37.0 (98.6)	37.2 (99.0)	40.6 (105.1)	42.8 (109.0)	41.8 (107.2)	42.0 (107.6)	39.0 (102.2)	40.0 (104.0)	39.6 (103.3)	38.6 (101.5)	36.2 (97.2)	35.6 (96.1)	42.8 (109.0)
Mean daily maximum °C (°F)	32.7 (90.9)	34.5 (94.1)	36.8 (98.2)	37.8 (100.0)	38.1 (100.6)	37.1 (98.8)	36.1 (97.0)	35.6 (96.1)	35.3 (95.5)	33.2 (91.8)	31.5 (88.7)	31.4 (88.5)	35.0 (95.0)
Mean daily minimum °C (°F)	20.4 (68.7)	20.5 (68.9)	22.2 (72.0)	22.9 (73.2)	23.3 (73.9)	23.1 (73.6)	22.8 (73.0)	22.8 (73.0)	22.8 (73.0)	22.1 (71.8)	21.5 (70.7)	20.7 (69.3)	22.1 (71.8)
Record low °C (°F)	13.0 (55.4)	13.0 (55.4)	17.0 (62.6)	19.0 (66.2)	19.0 (66.2)	19.0 (66.2)	19.0 (66.2)	19.0 (66.2)	18.0 (64.4)	17.6 (63.7)	14.4 (57.9)	14.0 (57.2)	13.0 (55.4)
Average rainfall mm (inches)	1.6 (0.06)	5.4 (0.21)	12.5 (0.49)	46.4 (1.83)	84.6 (3.33)	15.1 (0.59)	19.7 (0.78)	71.3 (2.81)	66.5 (2.62)	146.0 (5.75)	118.6 (4.67)	18.7 (0.74)	606.5 (23.88)
Average rainy days	0.2	0.3	0.4	2.2	4.2	1.2	1.5	3.8	4.5	9.2	7.0	2.3	36.9
Average relative humidity (%) (at 17:30 IST)	56	45	46	49	54	53	57	58	57	65	69	63	56
Source: India Meteorological Department

== Demographics ==
Historical population
Year	Pop.	±%
1901	15,529	—
1911	16,701	+7.5%
1921	22,911	+37.2%
1931	33,672	+47.0%
1941	39,483	+17.3%
1951	57,576	+45.8%
1961	73,762	+28.1%
1971	105,111	+42.5%
1981	142,252	+35.3%
1991	159,232	+11.9%
2001	173,600	+9.0%
2011	498,129	+186.9%
Sources: 1901 – 2001; 2011

Religion in Erode city
Religion	Percent(%)
Hindu	83.15%
Islam	12.37%
Christianity	3.94%

As of 2011, Erode has 521,776 in population with a sex-ratio of 996, above the national average of 929. A literacy rate of 85% compares favorably to the national average of 73%. The city had 43,184 households, with Scheduled Castes and Scheduled Tribes accounting for 11% and 0.15% of the population respectively. Of its 66,135 workers, 61,382 are classified as other workers and the rest in agriculture and household industries. As per the 2011 census, Hinduism was the majority religion with 83% adherents followed by Islam (12%) and Christianity (4%). Tamil is the major spoken language in the city.

== Economy ==
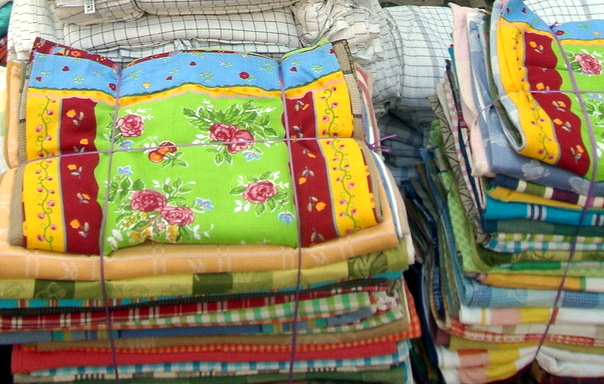
Textiles is a major industry in the city

The economy of Erode is dependent majorly on agriculture and textiles. It is a major textile hub specializing in handloom and knitwear. Erode is among the largest producers of turmeric in the state. Erode Turmeric is recognized as a Geographical Indication by the Government of India. Several food processing industries and poultry farms operate in and around the city. It is one of the largest markets for coconut and coconut oil in South India.

The GDP of Erode district grew at 15.5% in 2008 ahead of the state's GDP growth by 4%. According to Indian Census of 2001, urban workforce participation rate for Erode is 35% with growth in secondary and tertiary sectors and a corresponding decrease in the primary sector. Major employment is provided by textile industry, turmeric industry and oil and rice mills with 69% of its workforce employed in tertiary sector. Nethaji Market is a wholesale, and retail central market for vegetables and fruits with plans to establish a new wholesale market in the outskirts of the city.

== Administration and politics ==
Administration
Mayor	S. Nagarathinam
Commissioner	Arpit Jain
Member of Parliament	K. E. Prakash
Member of Legislative Assembly	Anand Mohan (Erode West)
Member of Legislative Assembly	Vijay Balaji (Erode East)

Erode is the headquarters of Erode District which was bifurcated from Coimbatore District in 1979. The city is administered by Erode Municipal Corporation. The town was constituted as a municipality in 1871, promoted to special-grade during 1980 and upgraded as a corporation in 2008. The city is sub-divided into 60 wards represented by elected councillors, who form part of the city council headed by a mayor. The functions of the corporation are devolved into six departments: general administration/personnel, Engineering, Revenue, Public Health, city planning and Information Technology under the control of a Municipal Commissioner who is the executive head.

Law and order is maintained by Erode sub division of Tamil Nadu Police headed by a Deputy Superintendent of Police. There are seven police stations located at Karungalpalayam, Bazaar, Surampatti, Veerappanchatram, Rangampalayam, Chithode and Government hospital. There are special units like armed reserve, prohibition enforcement, district crime, social justice and human rights, district crime records and a special branch. Erode has two state assembly constituencies namely Erode East and Erode West, which elect members to the Tamil Nadu Legislative Assembly once every five years and forms part of the Erode Lok Sabha constituency that elects its member to the Indian Parliament.

== Public services ==
Electricity supply is regulated and distributed by Tamil Nadu Electricity Board. The city along with its suburbs form a part of Erode Electricity Distribution Circle, headed by a chief distribution engineer. Water supply is provided by Erode Municipality, and is drawn from the Kaveri river and stored across eight reservoirs. For 2000–01, 14 million litres of water was supplied every day for households in the city. About 110-125 metric tonnes of solid waste were processed by the sanitary department in 2011. As there is no underground drainage system, disposal of sullage is through septic tanks, open drains and public conveniences with its 192 km (119 mi) of storm water drains. Government General Hospital serves as primary center of healthcare with several private hospitals providing supporting care. As of 2011, municipality maintained 4,678 street lamps. The corporation operates two vegetable markets and a textile market.

As of 2006, there were 46 public and private schools with four technical institutes. These include government run schools, schools funded by the government (aided schools) and private schools. These schools come under the purview of the Erode education district and follow Tamil Nadu Anglo Indian School Board, Tamil Nadu State Board, Matriculation or CBSE syllabus. There are four playgrounds in the city.

== Transport ==
=== Road ===
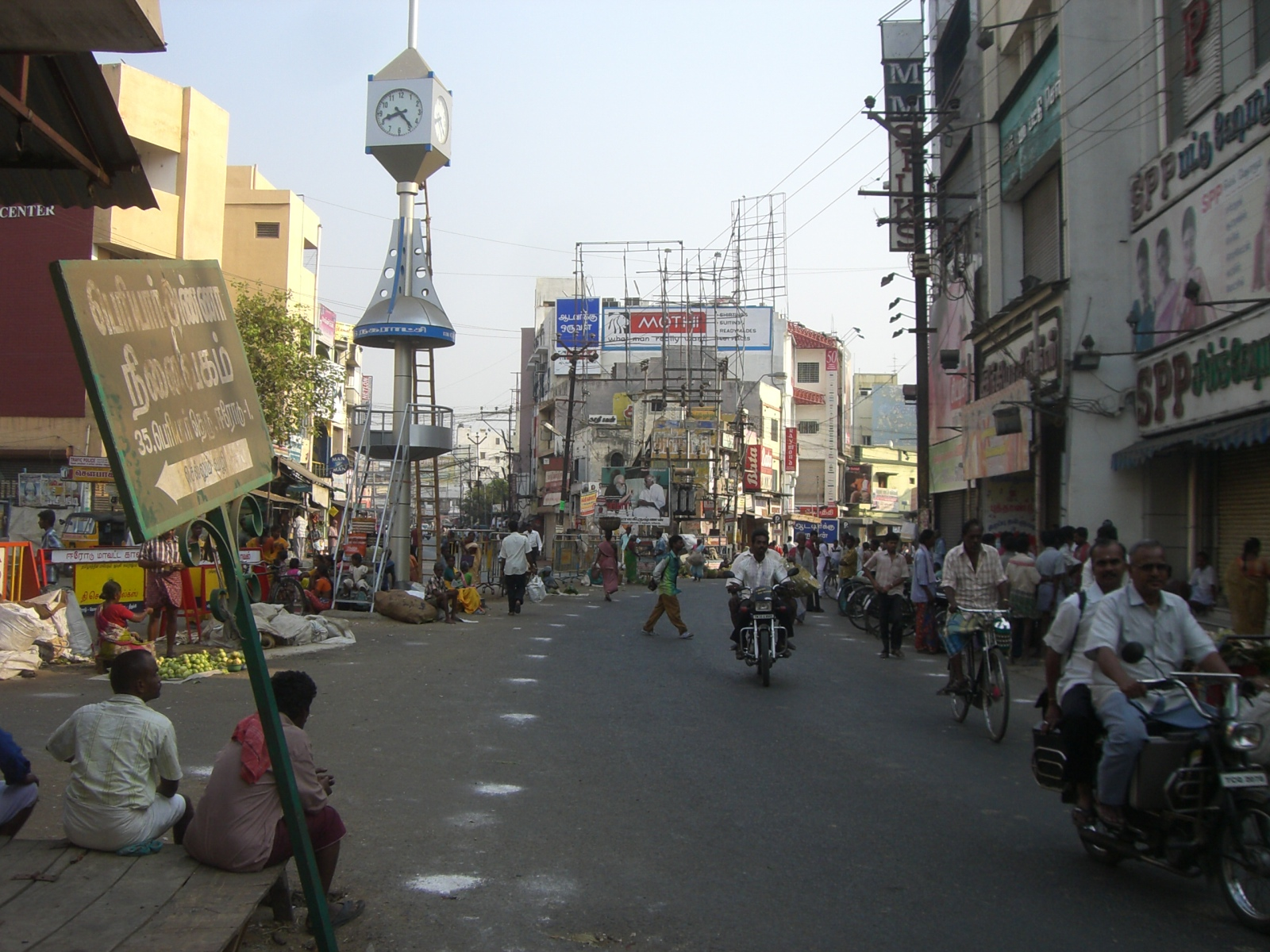
One of the arterial roads in the city

Erode Corporation maintains 102 km (63 mi) of local roads, of which 5 km (3.1 mi) are concrete roads and rest bituminous. About 16.6 km (10.3 mi) of state highways are maintained by State Highways Department. NH 544 connecting Salem and Coimbatore bypasses the city and the National Highway NH 381A and NH 544H pass through the city.. The main arterial roads include:

- SH-15: Erode – Gobichettipalayam – Sathy – Mettupalayam – Kotagiri – Ooty
- SH-83A: Erode – Arachalur – Kangeyam – Dharapuram
- SH-79: Erode – Tiruchengode – Rasipuram – Attur
- SH-79A: Erode – Pallipalayam – Sankagiri
- SH-84: Erode – Kodumudi – Karur
- SH-84A: Erode – Modakurichi – Vellakoil – Mulanur
- SH-96: Erode – Perundurai – Chennimalai – Kangeyam – Dharapuram
- SH-20: Erode – Bhavani

The Tamil Nadu State Transport Corporation has a sub-divisional headquarters at Erode under the Coimbatore division. The State Express Transport Corporation and private carriers operate long-distance buses connecting to major cities. Erode Central Bus Station, is the major bus terminus in the city. A satellite bus station at Solar, was inaugurated in November 2025.

=== Rail ===
Erode Junction railway station is a major rail-head in the Salem railway division of the Southern Railway zone. Diesel and electric locomotive sheds are located adjacent to the station. The station also serves as a hub for water filling facilities, food provisions and cleaning services for long-distance trains that run via Erode. The following are the lines running from Erode junction:

Line	Towards	Passing Through Station	Type / Track
Jolarpettai-Shoranur line	Salem Junction	Sankari Durg	Broad-gauge, electrified, double track
Jolarpettai-Shoranur line	Coimbatore Junction	Tiruppur	Broad-gauge, electrified, double track
Erode–Tiruchirappalli line	Tiruchirappalli Junction	Karur Junction	Broad-gauge, electrified, single track

=== Air ===
The nearest airport to Erode is Salem Airport at a distance of 84 km (52 mi). The nearest major international airport is the Coimbatore International Airport, located at a distance of 91 km (57 mi), which has regular flights to major domestic destinations and select international destinations including Abu Dhabi, Sharjah, and Singapore.

== Places of interest ==
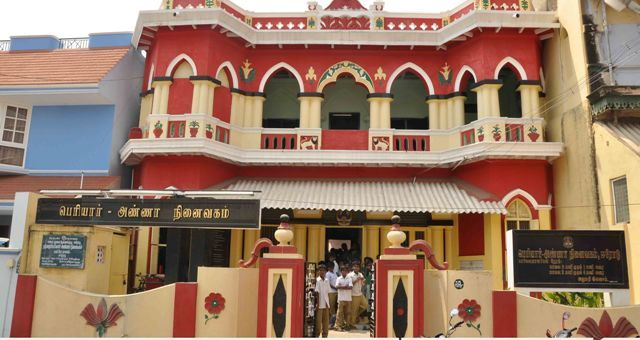
Periyar Memorial House in Erode

The Thindal Murugan Temple, situated 6 km (3.7 mi) from the city center, Periya Mariamman Temple, and Natadreeswarar Temple, are prominent religious destinations in the city. While the city was built around a demolished fort, a temple for Arudra Kabaleeswar (Shiva) praising the Saiva and one for Kasthuri Ranganatha Perumal (Vishnu) praising the Vaishnava aspects of Hinduism were built. The E.V.R. Museum, Vellode Bird Sanctuary, and Thanthai Periyar Memorial House, the former residence of Periyar E. V. Ramasamy, who was born in the city, are other major attractions. CSI Brough Memorial Church, located on Meenatchi Sundaranar Road was consecrated in 1933 by Antony Watson Brough (1861 -1936), an Australian missionary.

== Notable people ==
- Iswarya Menon (born 1995), actress
- J.Prabu (born 1986), actor and film director
- Mahesh (born 1981), TV artist and comedian
- Periyar E. V. Ramasamy, (1879 - 1973), social reformer
- Rio Raj (born 1989), actor
- Srinivasa Ramanujan (1887 - 1920), mathematician
- Sundar C (born 1968), actor and film director
