= Koorapalayam =

- Neighbourhood
- Koorapalayam, Erode (Tamil Nadu)
- Coordinates: 11.310080°N 77.630390°E
- Country: India
- State: Tamil Nadu
- District: Erode district
- Elevation: 250 m (820 ft)

Languages
  - Official: Tamil, English
- Time zone: UTC+5:30 (IST)
- PIN: 638107
- Telephone Code: +91424xxxxxxx
- Other Neighborhoods: Erode, Thindal, Nasiyanur, Nanjanapuram, Mettukkadai, Perundurai, Veerappampalayam, Pazhayapalayam, Veppampalayam, Pavalathampalayam, Kathirampatti and Villarasampatti
- Municipal body: Erode City Municipal Corporation
- District Collector: Krishnan Unni, I. A. S.
- LS: Erode Lok Sabha constituency
- VS: Erode West Assembly constituency
- MP: A. Ganeshamurthi
- MLA: S. Muthusamy
- Website: https://erode.nic.in

Koorapalayam is a neighbourhood in Erode district of Tamil Nadu state in the peninsular India.

Koorapalayam is located at an altitude of about 250 m above the mean sea level with the geographical coordinates of 11.310080°N 77.630390°E.

Maduriveeran Temple and Chinnamman Nattarayasamy Temple situated here are under the control of Hindu Religious and Charitable Endowments Department, Government of Tamil Nadu.

Koorapalayam area falls under the Erode West Assembly constituency. The winner of the election held in the year 2021 as the member of its assembly constituency is S. Muthusamy. Also, this area belongs to Erode Lok Sabha constituency. The winner of the election held in the year 2019, as the member of its Lok Sabha constituency is A. Ganeshamurthi.
