= Pungampadi =

- Neighbourhood
- Pungampadi, Erode (Tamil Nadu)
- Coordinates: 11.269200°N 77.652200°E
- Country: India
- State: Tamil Nadu
- District: Erode district
- Elevation: 263 m (863 ft)

Languages
  - Official: Tamil, English
- Time zone: UTC+5:30 (IST)
- PIN: 638112
- Telephone Code: +91424xxxxxxx
- Other Neighborhoods: Erode, Thindal, Nasiyanur, Nanjanapuram, Mettukkadai, Perundurai, Veerappampalayam, Pazhayapalayam, Veppampalayam, Pavalathampalayam, Kathirampatti and Villarasampatti
- Municipal body: Erode City Municipal Corporation
- District Collector: Krishnan Unni, I. A. S.
- LS: Erode Lok Sabha constituency
- VS: Erode West Assembly constituency
- MP: A. Ganeshamurthi
- MLA: S. Muthusamy
- Website: https://erode.nic.in

Pungampadi is a neighbourhood in Erode district of Tamil Nadu state in the peninsular India.

Pungampadi is located at an altitude of about 263 m above the mean sea level with the geographical coordinates of 11.269200°N 77.652200°E.

Abayathamman Temple and Mariamman Temple situated here are under the control of Hindu Religious and Charitable Endowments Department, Government of Tamil Nadu.

Pungampadi area falls under the Erode West Assembly constituency. The winner of the election held in the year 2021 as the member of its assembly constituency is S. Muthusamy. Also, this area belongs to Erode Lok Sabha constituency. The winner of the election held in the year 2019, as the member of its Lok Sabha constituency is A. Ganeshamurthi.
