= Kaniravutharkulam =

- Neighbourhood
- Kaniravutharkulam, Erode (Tamil Nadu)
- Coordinates: 11.364300°N 77.697700°E
- Country: India
- State: Tamil Nadu
- District: Erode district
- Elevation: 195 m (640 ft)

Languages
  - Official: Tamil, English
- Time zone: UTC+5:30 (IST)
- PIN: 638004
- Telephone Code: +91424xxxxxxx
- Other Neighborhoods: Erode, Veerappanchatram, Thindal, Nasiyanur, Nanjanapuram, Mettukkadai, Perundurai, Soolai, Veerappampalayam, Pazhayapalayam, Veppampalayam, Pavalathampalayam, Kathirampatti and Villarasampatti
- Municipal body: Erode City Municipal Corporation
- District Collector: Krishnan Unni, I. A. S.
- LS: Erode Lok Sabha constituency
- MP: A. Ganeshamurthi
- Website: https://erode.nic.in

Kaniravutharkulam is a neighbourhood in Erode district of Tamil Nadu state in the peninsular India. There is a pond in this area and is named as Kaniravuthar pond, and hence the name of the area, Kaniravutharkulam.

Kaniravutharkulam is located at an altitude of about 195 m above the mean sea level with the geographical coordinates of 11.364300°N 77.697700°E.

There is a proposal to establish a Bus stand here in Kaniravutharkulam near Soolai, where buses ply from Sathamangalam, Gobichettipalayam, Kavundapadi, etc. stay for a while.
