= Karungalpalayam =

Neighbourhood in Erode district, Tamil Nadu, India

Karungalpalayam கருங்கல்பாளையம்
- Neighbourhood
- Karungalpalayam, Erode (Tamil Nadu)
- Coordinates: 11.351600°N 77.738100°E
- Country: India
- State: Tamil Nadu
- District: Erode district
- Elevation: 193 m (633 ft)

Languages
  - Official: Tamil, English
  - Speech: Tamil, English
- Time zone: UTC+5:30 (IST)
- PIN: 638003
- Telephone Code: +91424xxxxxxx
- Vehicle registration: TN-86 yy xxxx
- Neighbourhoods: Erode, Pallipalayam, Moolapalayam, Moolapatrai, Veppampalayam, Nanjanapuram, Pavalathampalayam, Kathirampatti, Soolai, Kaniravutharkulam and Thindal
- Municipal Body: Erode City Municipal Corporation
- District Collector: Krishnan Unni, I. A. S.
- LS: Erode Lok Sabha constituency
- VS: Erode East Assembly constituency
- MP: A. Ganeshamurthi
- Website: https://erode.nic.in

Karungalpalayam (Tamil: கருங்கல்பாளையம்) also known as (K.G. Palayam) is a commercial suburb in the city of Erode. It is located on the banks of Cauvery River, 3 kilometres (1.9 mi) to the north-east of Erode Central Bus Terminus and 1 kilometre (0.62 mi) west of Pallipalayam. Kalingarayan Canal runs through Karungalpalayam.

The area is a mix of commercial and residential buildings. The economy of this urban area is primarily textile production using power looms.

== The ancient place ==
Karungalpalayam is one of the famous tourist locations, in the city of Erode, on Erode-Salem National Highways.

It is about 5 kilometres (3.1 mi) from Erode Junction Railway Station.

It is on the way to Kongu Tirupati and Tiruchengode, on the banks of the River Cauvery.

Sri Ragavendra Mutt is located here.

== Transport ==
The Cauvery Bridge, spanning the River Cauvery in Karungalpalayam is the major road connectivity to Pallipalayam and further east.

Karungalpalayam is well connected with city bus services to all major parts of the city. All the city buses going towards the East will have a stop here.

Also, the Waterways Ferry Services are available here, for transporting through Cauvery River to the other banks on Namakkal District. A Ferry Station is available here.

== Famous places ==
Mahakavi Bharathi Memorial Library is the place where Mahakavi Subramaniya Bharathi delivered his last public address. He spoke about "Man is Immortal".

Periya Mariyamman and Chinna Mariyamman are famous temples in Karungalapalayam. Also, Subrmaniyar temple, Pachchiyamman Kovil are there.

Old Head Register office of Erode is in Karungalapalayam.

== Codes ==
- PIN Code : 638 003
- STD Code : 0424
- Vehicle Regn. : TN 86

== Temples ==
Chinnamariamman Temple and Subramaniasamy Temple located in Karungalpalayam are under the control of Hindu Religious and Charitable Endowments Department, Government of Tamil Nadu.
