= Sampath Nagar =

- Neighbourhood
- Sampath Nagar, Erode (Tamil Nadu)
- Coordinates: 11.3388°N 77.7054°E
- Country: India
- State: Tamil Nadu
- District: Erode district
- Elevation: 208 m (682 ft)

Languages
  - Official: Tamil, English
- Time zone: UTC+5:30 (IST)
- PIN: 638011
- Telephone Code: +91424xxxxxxx
- Other Neighborhoods: Erode, Veerappanchatram, Thindal, Nasiyanur, Nanjanapuram, Mettukkadai, Perundurai, Veerappampalayam, Pazhayapalayam, Veppampalayam, Pavalathampalayam, Kathirampatti and Villarasampatti
- Municipal body: Erode City Municipal Corporation
- District Collector: Krishnan Unni, I. A. S.
- LS: Erode Lok Sabha constituency
- VS: Erode East Assembly constituency
- MP: A. Ganeshamurthi
- MLA: E. V. K. S. Elangovan
- Website: https://erode.nic.in

Sampath Nagar is a neighbourhood in Erode district of Tamil Nadu state in peninsular India.

Sampath Nagar is located at an altitude of about 208 m (682 ft) above sea level with the geographical coordinates of 11.3388°N 77.7054°E.

Sampath Nagar has a Park for common public established at a cost of about ₹52 lakhs.

Sampath Nagar area falls under the Erode East Assembly constituency. The winner of the by-election held in the year 2023 as the member of its assembly constituency is E. V. K. S. Elangovan. Also, this area belongs to Erode Lok Sabha constituency. The winner of the election held in the year 2019, as the member of its Lok Sabha constituency is A. Ganeshamurthi.
