= List of people from Erode district =

The following is a list of notable people who were either born in, are current residents of, or are otherwise closely associated with or from Erode district, Tamil Nadu, India.

== B ==
- K. Bhagyaraj, film actor

== C ==
- Dheeran Chinnamalai, freedom fighter
- S. Selvakumara Chinnayan, politician

== G ==
- P. K. Gopal, social worker and philanthropist

== I ==
- A. V. Ilango, writer and artist

== K ==
- Tiruppur Kumaran, freedom fighter

== L ==
- G. S. Lakshmanan, freedom fighter and philanthropist
- G. V. Loganathan, professor; killed in Virginia Tech shooting

== M ==
- S. K. M. Maeilanandhan, entrepreneur
- Mayilsamy, comedian and actor

== P ==
- Pongalur N. Palanisamy, politician

== R ==
- Srinivasa Ramanujan, mathematical prodigy and autodidact
- Periyar E. V. Ramasamy, social activist and politician
- K. S. Ramaswamy Gounder, freedom fighter and former union minister
- J.Ralphedil, Aeronautical Engineer & Scientist

== S ==
- J. Sudhanandhen Mudaliyar, educationalist, philanthropist, textile merchant.
- M. P. Saminathan, politician
- P. Sathasivam, former Chief Justice of India
- K. A. Sengottaiyan, Minister for School Education in the Tamil Nadu Government
- K B Sundarambal, actress
- Sundar C, director and actor
