= Erode Assembly constituency =

Former legislative Assembly constituency in Andhra Pradesh, India

Coordinates: 11°21′N 77°44′E

Erode
- Former constituency for the Tamil Nadu Legislative Assembly

Constituency details
- Country: India
- Region: South India
- State: Tamil Nadu
- District: Erode
- Lok Sabha constituency: Erode
- Established: 1951
- Abolished: 2008
- Total electors: 3,03,864
- Reservation: None

Erode was a state assembly constituency in Tamil Nadu, India. After the delimitation in 2008, the constituency ceased to exist and was replaced by two constituencies, namely Erode East and Erode West.

== Members of the Legislative Assembly ==
Year	Winner	Party
1952	Raju	Communist Party of India
1957	V. S. Manickasundaram	Indian National Congress
1962	A. S. Dakshinamurthy Gounder	Indian National Congress
1967	M. Chinnaswamy	Dravida Munnetra Kazhagam
1971	M. Subramanian	Dravida Munnetra Kazhagam
1977	S. Muthusamy	All India Anna Dravida Munnetra Kazhagam
1980	S. Muthusamy	All India Anna Dravida Munnetra Kazhagam
1984	S. Muthusamy	All India Anna Dravida Munnetra Kazhagam
1989	Subbulakshmi Jegatheesan	Dravida Munnetra Kazhagam
1991	C. Manickam	All India Anna Dravida Munnetra Kazhagam
1996	N. K. K. Periasamy	Dravida Munnetra Kazhagam
2001	K. S. Thennarasu	All India Anna Dravida Munnetra Kazhagam
2006	N. K. K. P. Raajah	Dravida Munnetra Kazhagam

== Election results ==
Vote share of winning candidates
2006	44.17%
2001	52.40%
1996	59.80%
1991	63.11%
1989	41.40%
1984	53.50%
1980	56.62%
1977	43.09%
1971	61.16%
1967	59.14%
1962	39.61%
1957	37.28%
1952	40.88%

=== 2006 ===
2006 Tamil Nadu Legislative Assembly election: Erode
Party	Candidate	Votes	%	±%
DMK	N. K. K. P. Raja	94,938	44.17%	5.19%
AIADMK	Sivakumar. E. R	84,107	39.13%	−13.27%
DMDK	V. C. Chandhirakumar	29,011	13.50%	
BJP	Chairman. Pon	1,588	0.74%	
Independent	Palanisamy. K	1,585	0.74%	
Independent	Muthukumar. R	1,320	0.61%	
BSP	Selladurai. K	581	0.27%	
Independent	Sekaran. R	398	0.19%	
Independent	Sukumaran. Pon	261	0.12%	
AIFB	Balan. R	253	0.12%	
Independent	Tamilrasu. M	225	0.10%	
Margin of victory		10,831	5.04%	−8.38%
Turnout		2,14,918	70.73%	13.98%
Registered electors		3,03,864		
DMK gain from AIADMK		Swing	-8.23%	

=== 2001 ===
2001 Tamil Nadu Legislative Assembly election: Erode
Party	Candidate	Votes	%	±%
AIADMK	K. S. Thennarasu	95,450	52.40%	19.92%
DMK	N. K. K. Periyasamy	71,010	38.98%	−20.82%
MDMK	A. Ganeshamurthi	9,846	5.41%	1.38%
Independent	Vengai Rajendran P.	2,233	1.23%	
Independent	Vinaya Kamoorthi. N.	1,524	0.84%	
TDK	Senthilkumar N.	658	0.36%	
Independent	Ramu V.	339	0.19%	
Independent	Nallasivam A. M.	218	0.12%	
Independent	Chokkalingam A. P.	211	0.12%	
Independent	Palanisamy R.	165	0.09%	
Independent	Murugesan S.	135	0.07%	
Margin of victory		24,440	13.42%	−13.90%
Turnout		1,82,154	56.74%	−6.52%
Registered electors		3,21,070		
AIADMK gain from DMK		Swing	-7.40%	

=== 1996 ===
1996 Tamil Nadu Legislative Assembly election: Erode
Party	Candidate	Votes	%	±%
DMK	N. K. K. Periasamy	104,726	59.80%	25.34%
AIADMK	S. Muthusamy	56,889	32.48%	−30.63%
MDMK	A. Ganeshamurthy	7,047	4.02%	
BJP	C. Ravi	1,433	0.82%	
PMK	V. K. Jambu	1,359	0.78%	
Independent	M. Devakumar	297	0.17%	
Independent	E. J. Narayanaram Singh	247	0.14%	
Independent	Thiruvenkatachala Mudaliar	233	0.13%	
Independent	K. Murugesan	201	0.11%	
Independent	K. N. Selvaraj	132	0.08%	
Independent	G. Nataraj	132	0.08%	
Margin of victory		47,837	27.32%	−1.34%
Turnout		1,75,129	63.27%	5.25%
Registered electors		2,83,064		
DMK gain from AIADMK		Swing	-3.32%	

=== 1991 ===
1991 Tamil Nadu Legislative Assembly election: Erode
Party	Candidate	Votes	%	±%
AIADMK	Manickam C.	96,226	63.11%	35.20%
DMK	A. Ganeshamurthy	52,538	34.46%	−6.94%
PMK	Rajendran P.	2,175	1.43%	
AMI	Karuppusamy P.	248	0.16%	
Tharasu Makkal Mandram	Neelakandan S.	184	0.12%	
Independent	Murugesan C.	176	0.12%	
Independent	Bhoopathi K.	131	0.09%	
Independent	Vijayakumar P.	110	0.07%	
Independent	Ayyasamy K.	107	0.07%	
Independent	Chandrasekaran P.	104	0.07%	
Independent	Shanmugasundaram R.	103	0.07%	
Margin of victory		43,688	28.66%	15.17%
Turnout		1,52,462	58.02%	−12.00%
Registered electors		2,67,353		
AIADMK gain from DMK		Swing	21.71%	

=== 1989 ===
1989 Tamil Nadu Legislative Assembly election: Erode
Party	Candidate	Votes	%	±%
DMK	Subbulakshmi Jagadeesan	68,128	41.40%	−3.41%
AIADMK	S. Muthusamy	45,930	27.91%	−25.59%
AIADMK	Manickam. C. M	33,391	20.29%	−33.21%
Independent	Gunasekaran. T. M	10,687	6.49%	
Independent	Muthusamy. K. M	2,234	1.36%	
Independent	Elangandhi. E. K. M	936	0.57%	
Independent	Ponnusamy. P. K. M	256	0.16%	
Independent	Palanisamy. M. K. M	250	0.15%	
Independent	Subramaniam. K. M	186	0.11%	
Independent	Mani P. M	155	0.09%	
Independent	Selvam. R. M	148	0.09%	
Margin of victory		22,198	13.49%	4.80%
Turnout		1,64,552	70.02%	−3.03%
Registered electors		2,37,642		
DMK gain from AIADMK		Swing	-12.10%	

=== 1984 ===
1984 Tamil Nadu Legislative Assembly election: Erode
Party	Candidate	Votes	%	±%
AIADMK	S. Muthusamy	71,722	53.50%	−3.12%
DMK	Subbulakshmi Jagadeesan	60,075	44.81%	
Independent	M. Nallasamy	332	0.25%	
Independent	Kannammal	312	0.23%	
Independent	P. Chinnasamy	272	0.20%	
Independent	Subramaniam	228	0.17%	
Independent	Amrose	226	0.17%	
Independent	P. Karuppusamy	217	0.16%	
Independent	M. R. Subramaniam	185	0.14%	
Independent	K. Ayyavoo	162	0.12%	
Independent	R. Shanmugasundaram	157	0.12%	
Margin of victory		11,647	8.69%	−8.12%
Turnout		1,34,060	73.04%	9.55%
Registered electors		1,89,520		
AIADMK hold		Swing	-3.12%	

=== 1980 ===
1980 Tamil Nadu Legislative Assembly election: Erode
Party	Candidate	Votes	%	±%
AIADMK	S. Muthusamy	62,342	56.62%	13.53%
INC	Sainathan. R.	43,839	39.82%	
JP	Varadharasan. K. V. V.	2,423	2.20%	
Independent	Karuppanan. M. S.	451	0.41%	
Independent	Balakrishnan. N.	268	0.24%	
Independent	Karunakaran. C.	257	0.23%	
Independent	Ayyavoo. K.	179	0.16%	
Independent	Subramaniam. G. S.	159	0.14%	
Independent	Chakharapani. R.	113	0.10%	
Independent	Shanmugasundaram. A.	73	0.07%	
Margin of victory		18,503	16.81%	−3.14%
Turnout		1,10,104	63.50%	5.21%
Registered electors		1,75,563		
AIADMK hold		Swing	13.53%	

=== 1977 ===
1977 Tamil Nadu Legislative Assembly election: Erode
Party	Candidate	Votes	%	±%
AIADMK	S. Muthusamy	37,968	43.09%	
DMK	M. Subramanian	20,389	23.14%	−38.02%
JP	K.R. Nallasivam	15,401	17.48%	
CPI	P. Thirumalairajan	12,995	14.75%	
Independent	Kesavalal Kalidas Sait	935	1.06%	
Independent	Gurunatha Mudaliar	277	0.31%	
Independent	K. Manickam	153	0.17%	
Margin of victory		17,579	19.95%	−2.38%
Turnout		88,118	58.29%	−10.95%
Registered electors		1,52,823		
AIADMK gain from DMK		Swing	-18.07%	

=== 1971 ===
1971 Tamil Nadu Legislative Assembly election: Erode
Party	Candidate	Votes	%	±%
DMK	M. Subramanian	47,809	61.16%	2.02%
INC	K. P. Muthusamy	30,358	38.84%	5.27%
Margin of victory		17,451	22.33%	−3.25%
Turnout		78,167	69.24%	−9.34%
Registered electors		1,15,588		
DMK hold		Swing	2.02%	

=== 1967 ===
1967 Madras Legislative Assembly election: Erode
Party	Candidate	Votes	%	±%
DMK	M. Chinnaswamy	45,471	59.14%	
INC	P. Arjunan	25,808	33.57%	−6.04%
CPI	R. C. Palaniappan	4,687	6.10%	
RPI(A)	M. Gurusamy	920	1.20%	
Margin of victory		19,663	25.57%	16.54%
Turnout		76,886	78.57%	2.95%
Registered electors		1,00,217		
DMK gain from INC		Swing	19.53%	

=== 1962 ===
1962 Madras Legislative Assembly election: Erode
Party	Candidate	Votes	%	±%
INC	A. S. Dhakshinamoorthy Gounder	32,895	39.61%	2.33%
WT	M. Chinnasami Gounder	25,392	30.57%	
Independent	P. K. Palamisami	24,769	29.82%	
Margin of victory		7,503	9.03%	2.87%
Turnout		83,056	75.62%	22.45%
Registered electors		1,13,826		
INC hold		Swing	2.33%	

=== 1957 ===
1957 Madras Legislative Assembly election: Erode
Party	Candidate	Votes	%	±%
INC	V. S. Manickasundaram	19,012	37.28%	2.35%
CPI	K. T. Raju	15,870	31.12%	
Independent	N. Chinnusami	14,531	28.49%	
Independent	S. Sidhla Gounder	1,584	3.11%	
Margin of victory		3,142	6.16%	0.22%
Turnout		50,997	53.17%	−7.88%
Registered electors		95,917		
INC gain from CPI		Swing	-3.60%	

=== 1952 ===
1952 Madras Legislative Assembly election: Erode
Party	Candidate	Votes	%	±%
CPI	Raju	21,251	40.88%	
INC	Deivasingamani Gounder	18,160	34.93%	34.93%
Independent	Chenniappa Gounder	6,805	13.09%	
Socialist Party (India)	Kandaswami	4,334	8.34%	
RPI	Krishnaswami	1,439	2.77%	
Margin of victory		3,091	5.95%	
Turnout		51,989	61.05%	
Registered electors		85,159		
CPI win (new seat)				
