= Pavalathampalayam =

- Neighbourhood
- Pavalathampalayam, Erode (Tamil Nadu)
- Coordinates: 11.301700°N 77.660750°E
- Country: India
- State: Tamil Nadu
- District: Erode district
- Elevation: 246 m (807 ft)

Languages
  - Official: Tamil, English
- Time zone: UTC+5:30 (IST)
- PIN: 638112
- Telephone Code: +91424xxxxxxx
- Other Neighborhoods: Erode, Thindal, Nasiyanur, Nanjanapuram, Mettukkadai, Perundurai, Veerappampalayam, Pazhayapalayam, Veppampalayam, Kathirampatti and Villarasampatti
- Municipal body: Erode City Municipal Corporation
- LS: Erode Lok Sabha constituency
- VS: Erode West Assembly constituency
- MP: A. Ganeshamurthi
- MLA: S. Muthusamy
- Website: https://erode.nic.in

Pavalathampalayam or Pagalathampalayam is a neighbourhood in Erode district of Tamil Nadu state in the peninsular India.

Pavalathampalayam is located at an altitude of about 246 m above the mean sea level with the geographical coordinates of 11.301700°N 77.660750°E (i.e., 11°18'06.1"N, 77°39'38.7"E). Erode, Sampath Nagar, Thindal, Nasiyanur, Nanjanapuram, Mettukkadai, Perundurai, Veerappampalayam, Pazhayapalayam, Veppampalayam, Kathirampatti and Villarasampatti are some of the important neighbourhoods of Pavalathampalayam. (Refer maps, for example, Google Maps, Google Earth, etc.)

Pavalathampalayam has a school viz., A. E. T. Schools, where bull taming play facilities were arranged in its grounds in the year 2020.

Pavalathampalayam area falls under the Erode West Assembly constituency. The winner of the election held in the year 2021 as the member of its assembly constituency is S. Muthusamy. Also, this area belongs to Erode Lok Sabha constituency. The winner of the election held in the year 2019, as the member of its Lok Sabha constituency is A. Ganeshamurthi.
