= List of educational institutions in Erode district =

This article consists of a non exhaustive list of educational institutions in Erode district, Tamil Nadu, India.

== Medical ==
=== Government colleges ===
- Government Erode Medical College

=== Private colleges ===
- Nandha Medical College

== Engineering and technology ==
=== Government colleges ===
- Government College of Engineering, Erode

=== Private or self-financing colleges ===
- Bannari Amman Institute of Technology, Sathyamangalam
- Erode Sengunthar Engineering College, Perundurai
- Kongu Engineering College, Perundurai
- Nandha Engineering College, Perundurai
- Sasurie College of Engineering, Vijayamangalam
- Shree Venkateshwara Hi-Tech Engineering College, Gobichettipalayam

== Arts and science ==
- Chikkaiah Naicker College
- Erode Arts and Science College, Erode
- Kongu Arts and Science College, Erode
- Gobi Arts and Science College, Gobichettipalayam
- P.K.R. Arts College for Women, Gobichettipalayam

== Schools ==
=== Private ===
- Christhu Jyothi Matric Higher Secondary School, Erode
- Navarasam Matriculation Higher Secondary School, Erode
- Shree Vidyalaya, Gobichettipalayam
- Velalar Vidyalayaa Senior Higher Secondary School, Thindal, Erode
- Bharathi Vidya Bhavan, Erode

=== Government Aided ===
- Diamond Jubilee Higher Secondary School, Gobichettipalayam
- Sengunthar Higher Secondary School, Erode

== See also ==
- List of educational institutions in Gobichettipalayam
