= ETMA Turmeric Market Complex =

- Location: Erode, Tamil Nadu, India
- Address: Nasiyanur Road, Semmampalayam
- Manager: Erode Marketing Committee - Regulated Market
- Owner: Erode Turmeric Merchants Association

ETMA Turmeric Complex or Erode Turmeric Merchants Association Turmeric Market is one of the four dedicated market places for turmeric in Erode, Tamil Nadu. Also called as Semmampalayam Turmeric Complex by the name of its location in Erode, Tamil Nadu. Erode is the second largest turmeric market in India, only behind Nizamabad. Erode Turmeric is a type of turmeric in spices category which has been given Geographical indication.

== History ==
The market originally operated in the core city area near the Clock Tower in an unorganized manner. Considering the space shortage and traffic congestion, it has been shifted to the new sprawling area spreading over 52 acres along the Nasiyanur Road in Erode. The original plan of shifting was to integrate all the four turmeric markets in the city and make it as an Integrated Turmeric Complex. However, due to some controversies, the other three markets continue to operate separately.

== Operation ==
The Market Complex is owned and maintained by the Erode Turmeric Merchants and Godown Owners Association, while the marketing and sale auctions were monitored and controlled by Erode Market Committee's Regulated Market. Erode Regulated Market has their Auction yard and branch office functioning inside the complex. It also has an extension counter of a Nationalized Bank. The market functions daily with Auction sales. This regulated market is being operated by President of ETMA Mr. Ravishankar, Secretary of ETMA Mr. Sakthivel, Treasurer of ETMA Mr. Mavivanan and Joint Secretary of ETMA Mr. Karthikeyan and other office bearers including executive members

Apart from this, the other three Turmeric Markets functioning in Erode are

- Erode Market Committee's Perundurai Regulated Market - EMC Perundurai Turmeric Market Complex at Karumandisellipalayam
- Erode Agricultural Producers Cooperative Marketing Society's EAPCMS Turmeric Market Complex at Karungalpalayam and Thindal
- Gobichettipalayam Agricultural Producers Cooperative Marketing Society's Erode GAPCMS Turmeric Market near Clock Tower, Erode

== See also ==
- Erode Turmeric
- Abdul Gani Textile Market
