= Veppampalayam =

- Neighbourhood
- Veppampalayam, Erode (Tamil Nadu)
- Coordinates: 11.292500°N 77.658600°E
- Country: India
- State: Tamil Nadu
- District: Erode district
- Elevation: 249 m (817 ft)

Languages
  - Official: Tamil, English
- Time zone: UTC+5:30 (IST)
- PIN: 638112
- Telephone Code: +91424xxxxxxx
- Other Neighborhoods: Erode, Thindal, Nasiyanur, Nanjanapuram, Mettukkadai, Perundurai, Veerappampalayam, Pazhayapalayam, Pavalathampalayam, Kathirampatti and Villarasampatti
- Municipal body: Erode City Municipal Corporation
- LS: Erode Lok Sabha constituency
- VS: Erode West Assembly constituency
- MP: A. Ganeshamurthi
- MLA: S. Muthusamy
- Website: https://erode.nic.in

Veppampalayam is a neighbourhood in Erode district of Tamil Nadu state in the peninsular India.

Veppampalayam is located at an altitude of 249 m above the mean sea level with the geographical coordinates of 11.292500°N 77.658600°E (i.e., 11°17'33.0"N, 77°39'31.0"E). Erode, Thindal, Nasiyanur, Nanjanapuram, Mettukkadai, Perundurai, Veerappampalayam, Pazhayapalayam, Pavalathampalayam, Kathirampatti and Villarasampatti are some of the important neighbourhoods of Veppampalayam.

Veppampalayam area falls under the Erode West Assembly constituency. The winner of the election held in the year 2021 as the member of its assembly constituency is S. Muthusamy. Also, this area belongs to Erode Lok Sabha constituency. The winner of the election held in the year 2019, as the member of its Lok Sabha constituency is A. Ganeshamurthi.
