= K. C. Karuppannan =

Indian politician

Member of the Tamil Nadu Legislative Assembly
- Incumbent
- Assumed office 16 May 2016
- Preceded by: P. G. Narayanan
- Constituency: Bhavani
- In office 13 May 2001 – 11 May 2006
- Preceded by: S. N. Balasubramanian
- Succeeded by: R. V. Ramanathan
- Constituency: Bhavani

Minister of Environment Government of Tamil Nadu
- In office 16 May 2016 – 2 May 2021
- Preceded by: M. Mariam Pichai
- Succeeded by: Meyyanathan Siva V

Personal details
- Born: 1957 (age 68–69) Kavandapadi, Erode, Tamil Nadu, India
- Party: All India Anna Dravida Munnetra Kazhagam
- Parent: Chinniagounder (father)
- Occupation: Politician

Kavandapadi Chinniagounder Karuppannan, better known as K. C. Karuppannan, is an Indian politician and a member of the Tamil Nadu Legislative Assembly. He was elected from Bhavani constituency as a candidate of the AIADMK in 2001, 2016, 2021, and 2026. A very humble and calm headed person who reaches each and every individual in his constituency and fulfills their needs, made him a hero among the people of his constituency.

Then-Chief Minister J. Jayalalithaa appointed Karuppannan as Minister in her cabinet in May 2016. He served as the Minister of Environment and Pollution Control (from 2016-2021). This was his first cabinet post in the Government of Tamil Nadu.

== Electoral performance ==
Election	Constituency	Political party	Result	Vote %	Opposition			Ref
Election	Constituency	Political party	Result	Vote %	Candidate	Political party	Vote %	Ref
2001	Bhavani	AIADMK	Won	58.20%	J. Sudhanandhen	PNK	28.50%	
2006	Bhavani	AIADMK	Lost	37.52%	K. V. Ramanathan	PMK	41.55%	
2016	Bhavani	AIADMK	Won	45.38%	N. Sivakumar	DMK	32.21%	
2021	Bhavani	AIADMK	Won	50.63%	K. P. Durairaj	DMK	39.33%	-
2026	Bhavani	AIADMK	Won	36.28%	Balakrishnan	TVK	32.73%	-
