= State Highway 173 (Tamil Nadu) =

State highway in Tamil Nadu, India

State Highway 173

Route information
- Maintained by Highways and Minor Ports Department
- Length: 26 km (16 mi)

Major junctions
- East end: Erode
- West end: Thingalur

Location
- Country: India
- State: Tamil Nadu
- Districts: Erode.
- Primary destinations: Nasiyanur

Highway system
- Roads in India; Expressways; National; State; Asian; State Highways in Tamil Nadu

State Highway 173 runs entirely inside the Erode district in the South Indian state of Tamil Nadu, India. It connects the city of Erode with Thingalur.

== Route ==
The highway passes through Nasiyanur, Pethampalayam and Nallampatti extending to a length of 26 km.

== Major junctions ==
- State Highway 96 at Erode
- Erode Ring Road (MDR-62) at Villarasampatti
- National Highway NH-544 (Old NH-47) at Perundurai
