= A. M. Raja =

A. M. Raja may refer to:

- A. M. Rajah (1929–1989), Indian playback singer
- A. M. Raja (politician) (born 1928), Indian politician

== See also ==
- Raja (disambiguation)
