= Vadamugam Vellode =

Village in Tamil Nadu, India

Vadamugam Vellode or V.Vellode, simply called Vellode is a village panchayat located in Erode district (Tamil Nadu / India).

Vellode got its name from the words vellai oodai meaning "white stream". There runs a stream in Vellode with alluvial sediment making it white colour and hence the name. The name is synonymous with other town names like Erode and Chithode.

It houses the Vellode Birds Sanctuary on the lake.

It is 15 km along the route from Erode to Chennimalai .

== Temples ==
- There is a historical big temple here 'Raasaa temple' which is renovated recently.
- Also, is a 'Lakshmi Narasimha' temple (Vaishnavite temple) @ the junction of Perundurai - Chennimalai - Erode roads.
- An Ancient 1000 Year Old Shri Aadinath Digamber Jain Temple near the Vellode Bus Stop. Devotees from Local and Migrated North Indian Jain Devotees also visit This Temple.

Avalpoondurai Jain Digambera Paramabara Pujaris Done Puja Every Day from more than 8th Generation. This Temple Called " AMMANEESWARAR KOIL" By Local People.

- And also is an 'Amman temple', where Fridays are busy by the devotees.
- There is also a Karruparayan duo nachivaya karruparayan and Eri (lake) karruparayan guarding their respective lakes (small one and a big one ) .

== Neighbourhoods ==
- Perundurai (10 km)
- Avalpoondurai (8 km)
- Erode (15 km)
- Chennimalai (12 km)
- Kaspapettai (9 km)
- Perundurai railway station (6 km)
- Pungampadi
- Arachalur (10 km)
