= Cheenu Pillai =

Indian artist

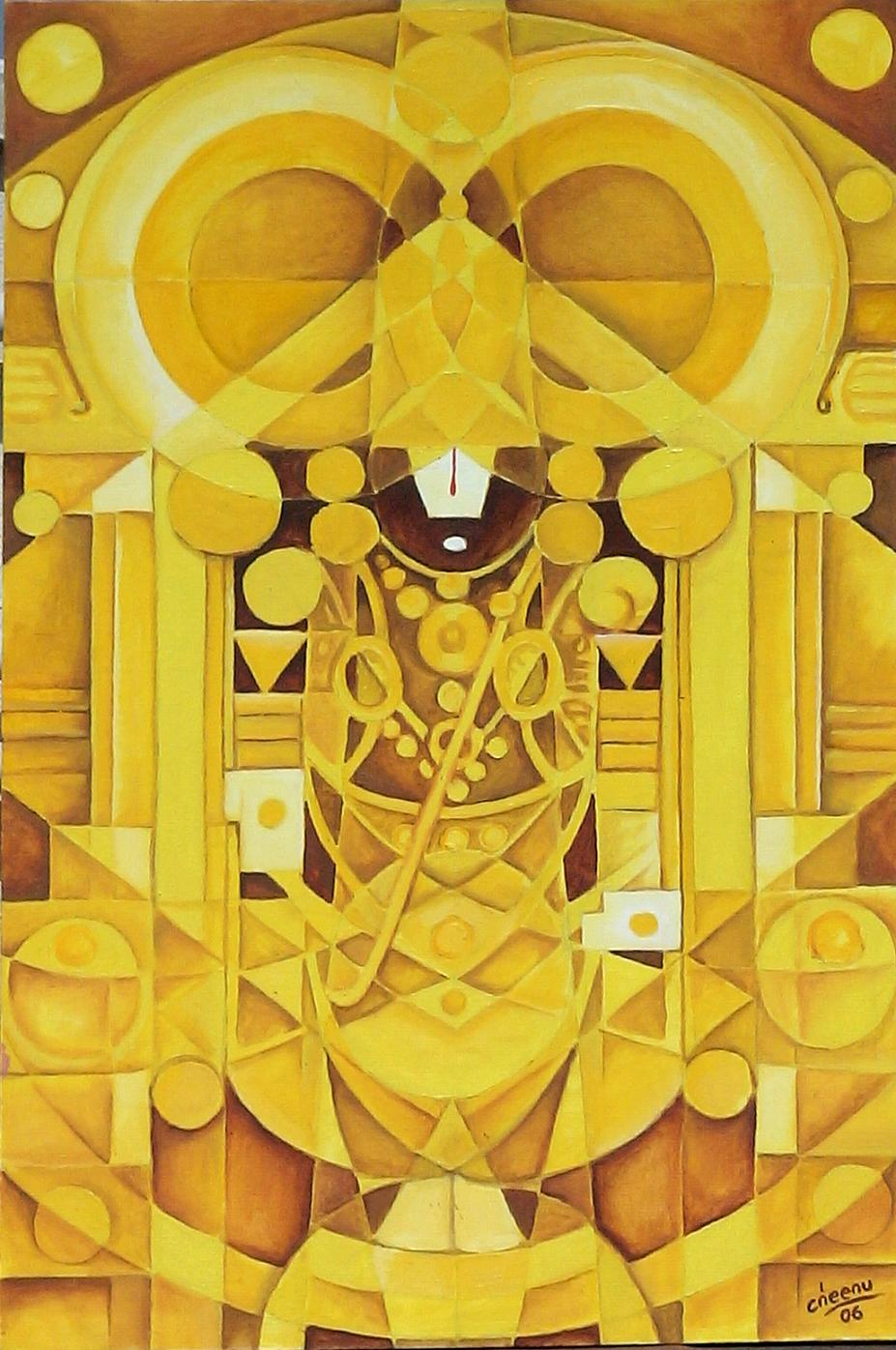
- Balaji (2006) Oil on canvas
- Born: 19 December 1971 (age 54); Pattukottai, India
- Education: Self taught
- Known for: Painting
- Notable work: Celestial Wedding, Dasavatar,Advaitham,Beloved thief
- Movement: Dravidian Orphism

Cheenu Pillai is a self-taught artist from Chennai, India, who blends European expressionism with dravidian themes.

== Career ==
Cheenu Pillai (born in 1971 in a village within the Tanjore district) received his early education in both his village and Tanjore. He was introduced to painting at a young age by his elder brother, also an artist. Pillai initially focused on religious portraits, a theme influenced by his religious upbringing. As his artistic exploration deepened, he developed an appreciation for the symmetrical and balanced forms present in Hindu iconography

Despite nurturing a lifelong passion for art, he did not initially consider it as a career path. His academic excellence in school led him towards pursuing a white-collar occupation, eventually working in investment banking after completing his MBA. Later, the evolving landscape of information technology prompted a mid-career shift, although art remained his foremost passion. His inspiration flourished during his time in Europe, where he frequently visited art galleries.

In 2003, he made a decisive commitment to his artistic pursuits, resigning from his role as the president of a prominent software company. While he maintained involvement in software consultancy, he also dedicated more time to his painting endeavors.

Apparao galleries included Cheenu's works as part of a group show in 2004. Again in 2007, A.v.ilango's art space and Tangerine art sponsored an exhibition of his paintings from the divinity series at the tangerine restaurant, which gave him the initial impetus. Cheenu was part of a group show at Apparao galleries in 2009

== Style ==
Cheenu Pillai has evolved a unique style of representation which is hybrid between European movements like cubism, expressionism, orphism and Indian sensibilities in terms of color schemes and layouts.
