= N. K. K. P. Raja =

Indian politician

Minister for Textiles and Handlooms
- In office 13 May 2006 – 8 August 2008
- First Minister: M. Karunanidhi
- Preceded by: V. Somasundaram
- Succeeded by: K. K. S. S. R. Ramachandran

Member of the Tamil Nadu Legislative Assembly
- In office 11 May 2006 – 13 May 2011
- Preceded by: K. S. Thennarasu
- Constituency: Erode

Personal details
- Born: 8 March 1966 (age 60) Aavarankattur, Tamil Nadu, India
- Party: Dravida Munnetra Kazhagam
- Spouse: parimala Raja
- Children: NKKP.Naren raaja
- Website: Member Profile - Thiru RAJA, NKK. P.

N. K. K. P. Raja (born 8 March 1966) is an Indian politician who served as the Minister for Textiles and Handlooms, Tamil Nadu in the M. Karunanidhi cabinet during 2006-08. He is the son of N. K. K. Periasamy, himself a former minister who held the same portfolio in the 1996-2001 Karunanidhi Cabinet. He is a member of the 13th Tamil Nadu Assembly representing the Erode Constituency in Tamil Nadu and is a member of the Dravida Munnetra Kazhagam (DMK) political party.

== Controversies ==
In June 2008, an aged couple claimed that NKKP Raja called them over phone and asked them to register their 10-acre (40,000 m^{2}) land in favour of his men. They alleged that Raja and others had a role in their abduction in connection with a property claim. They also filed a memo apprehending danger to their lives as well as those of their grandchildren. In August 2008, he was dropped from the state cabinet. In October 2009, he was involved in a violent altercation with Sivabalan, the couple's son. Both Raja and Sivabalan were admitted to hospitals with injuries which both of them allege were caused by the other and police registered cases against them. On 26 October 2009, he was expelled from the primary membership of the DMK.
