= Pallapalayam =

Pallapalayam may refer to places in India:

- Pallapalayam, Erode
- Pallapalayam, Coimbatore
