= Kolathanvalasu =

Village in India

Kolathanvalsu is a small village in Pethampalayam panchayat in Perundurai taluk in Erode district, Tamil Nadu, India.

== Etymology ==
There was a big pond (Tamil: குளம்) at the east side of the village, so the village name became Kolathanvalasu (Tamil: கொளத்தான்வலசு).

== Geography ==
This village is located at 11.364844, 77.572323. The whole village is full of agricultural land. There is a big pond at the northern-east side of the village.

== Occupation ==
Most of the people living in this village practice agriculture.This is because of the water coming from Bhavanisagar Dam. This village also use to practice hand-looming and these finished products were of high quality but, nowadays not many of them are doing this.

== People ==
The population is around 500 people. Most of the families are Kongu Vellalar, and there is a very small percentage of Chettiar.

== Economy ==
The main source of economy is agriculture and highways contract businesses. Many people are employed too; some are also employers. Some of them also conduct financial business.

== Education ==
At the centre of the village is the Union Primary School. The village is surrounded by a number of government and private schools and colleges.

== Temples ==
There are five major temples in the village:

- Shree Maari Amman temple
- Shree Shivarajakkal Temple
- Vasudevaperumal Temple (Kolathanvalsu)
- Shree Pattatharasi Amman temple
- Shree Kottappudi Muniyappan Swamy temple
