= Mukasipidariyur =

- Panchayat town
- Location in Tamil Nadu, India
- Coordinates: 11°12′25″N 77°35′32″E
- Country: India
- State: Tamil Nadu
- District: Erode

Area
  - Total: 14 km^{2} (5.4 sq mi)

Population (2011)
  - Total: 14,143
  - Density: 1,000/km^{2} (2,600/sq mi)

Languages
  - Official: Tamil
- Time zone: UTC+5:30 (IST)

Mukasipidariyur is a panchayat town in Perundurai taluk of Erode district in the Indian state of Tamil Nadu. It is located in the north-western part of the state. Spread across an area of 14 km^{2} (5.4 sq mi), it had a population of 14,143 individuals as per the 2011 census.

== Geography and administration ==
Mukasipidariyur is located in Perundurai taluk, Erode division of Erode district in the Indian state of Tamil Nadu. Spread across an area of 14 km^{2} (5.4 sq mi), it is one of the 42 panchayat towns in the district. It is located in the north-western part of the state towards the southern end of the Indian peninsula.

The town panchayat is headed by a chairperson, who is elected by the members, who are chosen through direct elections. The town forms part of the Perundurai Assembly constituency that elects its member to the Tamil Nadu legislative assembly and the Tiruppur Lok Sabha constituency that elects its member to the Parliament of India.

== Demographics ==
As per the 2011 census, Mukasipidariyur had a population of 14,143 individuals across 4,362 households. The population saw a significant increase compared to the previous census in 2001 when 11,012 inhabitants were registered. The population consisted of 7,108 males and 7,035 females. About 1,132 individuals were below the age of six years. The entire population is classified as urban. The town has an average literacy rate of 75.3%. About 9.5% of the population belonged to scheduled castes.

About 60.7% of the eligible population were employed with majority employed in agriculture and allied activities. Hinduism was the majority religion which was followed by 98.2% of the population, with Christianity (1.2%) and Islam (0.4%) being minor religions.
