= K. E. Prakash =

Member of Lok Sabha

Member of Parliament, Lok Sabha
- Incumbent
- Assumed office 4 June 2024
- Preceded by: A. Ganeshamurthi
- Constituency: Erode

Personal details
- Party: Dravida Munnetra Kazhagam
- Occupation: Politician

K. E. Prakash is an Indian politician and a member of the Lok Sabha from Erode Lok Sabha constituency of Tamil Nadu. He is a member of Dravida Munnetra Kazhagam. In the 2024 general election of India, he defeated Ashok Kumar of All India Anna Dravida Munnetra Kazhagam by a margin of 236,566 votes.
