= Diamond Jubilee School =

Diamond Jubilee School may refer to these schools in India:

- Diamond Jubilee High School, Byculla, Mumbai, Maharashtra, India; established to commemorate the Diamond Jubilee of Queen Victoria
- Diamond Jubilee Higher Secondary School, Gobichettipalayam, Tamil Nadu, India; established to commemorate the Diamond Jubilee of Queen Victoria in 1898

== See also ==
- Platinum Jubilee High School, Warangal, Warangal, Telangana, India
