= List of educational institutions in Gobichettipalayam =

Gobichettipalayam is an industrial and agricultural area, and is an educational hub. It sends the second highest number of students to professional courses in Tamil Nadu each year.

== Institutes of engineering and technology ==
- Shree Venkateshwara Hi-Tech Engineering College, Othakuthirai
- J.K.K. Munirajah college of Technology, T.N.Palayam
- Bannari Amman Institute of Technology, Sathy

== Arts and science colleges ==
- Gobi Arts and Science College, Karatadipalayam
- P.K.R. Arts College for Women, Murugan Pudur
- Saratha College Of Arts And Science, Gobichettipalayam
- Govt Arts And Science College, Thittamalai, Nambiyur

== Business schools ==
- P.K.R. School of Management for Women, Muruganpudur
- Gem Business Academy, Kolappalur

== Others ==
- Sudar College of Paramedical Science, Kolappalur
- Anndavar Polytechnic College, Kovai Privu
- Andavar Industrial Training Institute, Gobichettipalayam
- Shree Venkateshwara Hi-Tech Polytechnic College, Othakuthirai
- Government ITI, Dasappagounden Pudur

== Schools ==
- Narayana E-techno School, Modachur Road, Gobichettipalayam.
- Diamond Jubilee Matriculation School, Ram Nagar, Gobi
- Sri Venkateshwara vidyalaya Matric and Higher Secondary School, Thasampalam, Gobi
- Diamond Jubilee Higher Secondary School, Cutchery Street
- Palaniammal Girls Higher Secondary School, Gobichettipalayam
- C.K.K. Matriculation Higher Secondary School, Gobichettipalayam
- Shree Vidyalaya|Shree Vidyalaya Matriculation Higher Secondary School, Vaikkal Road
- Saratha Matriculation and Higher Secondary School, Modachur
- Amala matriculation and Higher secondary school, Gobichettipalayam
- Bharathi Vidyalaya school, Gobichettipalayam
- Kamban Kalvi Nilayam Matric Higher Sec School, Gobichettipalayam
- Shree Gurukulam Higher Secondary School, Gobichettipalayam
- St. Paul's Matriculation and Higher Secondary School, Gobichettipalayam

== See also ==
- List of Educational Institutions in Erode
- List of schools in Coimbatore
