= State Highway 96 (Tamil Nadu) =

State highway in Tamil Nadu

State Highway 96

Route information
- Maintained by Highways and Minor Ports Department
- Length: 51 km (32 mi)

Major junctions
- North end: Erode
- South end: Kangeyam

Location
- Country: India
- State: Tamil Nadu
- Districts: Erode, Tiruppur.
- Primary destinations: Perundurai, Chennimalai

Highway system
- Roads in India; Expressways; National; State; Asian; State Highways in Tamil Nadu

State Highway 96 runs in Erode district and Tiruppur district of Tamil Nadu, India. It connects the towns of Erode and Kangeyam via Perundurai.

== Route ==
The highway passes through Perundurai and Chennimalai extending to a length of 51 km.

== Major junctions ==
- Intersects National Highway 381A near MGR Statue at Erode
- State Highway 173 near MGR Statue at Erode
- Erode Ring Road near Thindal, Erode
- National Highway NH-544 (Old NH-47) at Perundurai
- State Highway 83A at Kangeyam
- State Highway 172 at Kangeyam
- National Highway NH-81 (Old NH-67) at Kangeyam
