= Karumandi Chellipalayam =

- Panchayat town
- Location in Tamil Nadu, India
- Coordinates: 11°18′34″N 77°34′56″E
- Country: India
- State: Tamil Nadu
- District: Erode

Area
  - Total: 25.06 km^{2} (9.68 sq mi)

Population (2011)
  - Total: 23,868
  - Density: 952.4/km^{2} (2,467/sq mi)

Languages
  - Official: Tamil
- Time zone: UTC+5:30 (IST)
- Vehicle registration: TN-56

Karumandi Chellipalayam is a panchayat town in Perundurai taluk of Erode district in the Indian state of Tamil Nadu. It is located in the north-western part of the state. Spread across an area of 25.06 km^{2} (9.68 sq mi), it had a population of 23,868 individuals as per the 2011 census.

== Geography and administration ==
Karumandi Chellipalayam is located in Perundurai taluk, Erode division of Erode district in the Indian state of Tamil Nadu. Spread across an area of 7.44 km^{2} (2.87 sq mi), it is one of the 42 panchayat towns in the district. It is located in the north-western part of the state towards the southern end of the Indian peninsula.

The town panchayat is headed by a chairperson, who is elected by the members, who are chosen through direct elections. The town forms part of the Perundurai Assembly constituency that elects its member to the Tamil Nadu legislative assembly and the Tiruppur Lok Sabha constituency that elects its member to the Parliament of India.

== Demographics ==
As per the 2011 census, Karumandi Chellipalayam had a population of 23,868 individuals across 6,817 households. The population saw a significant increase compared to the previous census in 2001 when 20,072 inhabitants were registered. The population consisted of 11,652 males and 12,216 females. About 2,151 individuals were below the age of six years. The entire population is classified as urban. The town has an average literacy rate of 82.4%. About 14.2% of the population belonged to scheduled castes.

About 47.2% of the eligible population were employed. Hinduism was the majority religion, which was followed by 89.8% of the population, with Islam (6.8%) and Christianity (3.7%) being minor religions.
