= Mahakavi Bharathi Memorial Library =

Coordinates: 11.351286°N 77.71758°E

Mahakavi Bharathi Memorial Library is a Public Library located in Karungalpalayam, Erode, in the South Indian state of Tamil Nadu. It was named in memorandum of the Tamil patriotic poet Mahakavi Subramanya Bharathi. It is also known as Bharathiyar Memorial Library and commonly called as Karungalpalayam Library.

== History ==
Earlier, the library was nothing but a reading room for the local people by the name Karungalpalayam Reading Room. Later, after the visit of Subramanya Bharathi to this reading room in the year of 1921, it has been upgraded as a public library, in memory of him.

== Bharathi visit ==
In the year of 1921 July 31, Mahakavi Bharathi came to the Karungalpalayam Reading Room, to deliver a speech for the public on the topic Man is Immortal. A few weeks later he felt ill and died. The speech he gave in Karungalpalayam was his last public speech.

== Collections ==
Later, Erode administration has renovated the old building and upgraded the library. The library has many portraits and books of Bharathiar. Bharathiyar's lectures in public meetings and his writings in the daily ‘Swadesamitran’ Tamil paper were also displayed. After inaugurating the building, the officials said the Bharathiar memorial library would be upgraded and they have planned include another 40,000 books to the library.

== Library museum ==
Apart from collection of books and several volumes of articles being placed in the library, it houses a minor historical museum on Mahakavi Subramanya Bharathi's life. It also showcases several portraits of the poet and the books written by him. Bharathiyar's lectures in Public meetings and his writings in the daily Swadesamitran Tamil Paper were also displayed.
