= Komayanvalasu =

Village in India

Komayanvalasu is a village in Perundurai taluk of Erode district in the Indian state of Tamil Nadu. It is located 8 km away from National Highway 544 between Salem and Coimbatore. It is 18 km from Gobichettipalayam, 18 km from Erode and 10 km from Perundurai.

== Agriculture ==
The economy of Komayanvalasu centers on agriculture, viz paddy, sugarcane, plantain, tobacco, and turmeric.
