= K. K. Ananth Moghan =

Indian politician

K. K. Ananth Moghan is an Indian politician and member of Tamilaga Vettri Kazhagam (TVK). He is the elected Member of the Legislative Assembly (MLA) for the Erode West Assembly constituency in Erode district, Tamil Nadu, in the 2026 Tamil Nadu Legislative Assembly election.
