= Erode Sengunthar Engineering College =

Autonomous Private engineering college in Tamil Nadu, India

Coordinates: 11°18′51″N 77°33′05″E

- Other name: ESEC
- Motto: "Service Excellence Character"
- Type: Autonomous Private Engineering College
- Established: 1996; 30 years ago
- Founder: J. Sudhanandhen Mudaliyar
- Academic affiliations: Anna University, Chennai.
- Principal: Dr. V. Venkatachalam
- Location: Perundurai, Erode, Tamil Nadu, India., 638057
- Campus: 55.54 acres (22.48 ha)
- Trust: Erode Sengunthar Kaikola Mudaliyar Educational trust
- Website: erode-sengunthar.ac.in

Erode Sengunthar Engineering College is an autonomous, private engineering college in Thudupathi, 5 km from Perundurai, 22 km from Erode, Tamil Nadu, India. It is affiliated with Anna University, Chennai.

== Ranking 2023 ==
Erode Sengunthar Engineering College is positioned in the 51-100 Band NIRF, Innovation Ranking 2023, released in June 2023 by Ministry of Education, Government of India. The Institution also ranked 22, National level under Top T Schools in India 2023 & 7th in Tamil Nadu ranked by Data Quest - CMR Survey 18th Edition, released in March 2023.

== Inception ==
The college was started by Erode Sengunthar Educational Trust in 1996. It has ISO 9001:2008 certification and is accredited by the National Board of Accreditation. It is affiliated to Anna University, Chennai. All the undergraduate courses offered are permanently affiliated to Anna University, Chennai. It is an Autonomous Institution, accredited with the National Assessment and Accreditation Council (NAAC) Bengaluru with 'A' grade.

== Departments and courses ==
=== Department of Bio Medical Engineering ===
- B.E. Bio Medical Engineering (four years)

=== Department of Civil Engineering ===
- B.E. Civil Engineering (four years)
- M.E. Environmental Engineering (two years)
- M.E. Structural Engineering (two years)

=== Department of Computer Science and Engineering ===
- B.E. Computer Science and Engineering (four years)
- B.E. Computer Science and Engineering (AI & ML) (four years)
- B.E. Computer Science and Engineering (Cyber Security) (four years)
- M.Tech. Computer Science and Engineering (five years integrated)
- M.E. Computer Science and Engineering (two years)

=== Department of Computer Science and Design ===
- B.E. Computer Science and Design (four years)

=== Department of Electrical and Electronics Engineering ===
- B.E. Electrical and Electronics Engineering (four years)
- M.E. Power Electronics and Drives (two years)

=== Department of Electronics and Communication Engineering ===
- B.E. Electronics and Communication Engineering (four years)
- M.E. Applied Electronics (two years)

=== Department of Electronics and Instrumentation Engineering ===
- B.E. Electronics and Instrumentation Engineering (four years)

=== Department of Mechanical Engineering ===
- B.E. Mechanical Engineering (four years)
- B.E. Mechanical Engineering, Tamil Medium (four years)
- M.E. Manufacturing Engineering (two years)
- M.E Industrial Safety Engineering (two years)

=== Department of Robotics and Automation Engineering ===
- B.E. Robotics and Automation Engineering (four years)

=== Department of Agricultural Engineering ===
- B.Tech. Agricultural Engineering (four years)

=== Department of Artificial Intelligence and Data Science ===
- B.Tech. Artificial Intelligence and Data Science (four years)

=== Department of Chemical Engineering ===
- B.Tech. Chemical Engineering (four years)
- B.Tech. Bio Technology (four years)
- M.Tech. Chemical Engineering (two years)

=== Department of Information Technology ===
- B.Tech. Information Technology (four years)

=== Department of Business Administration ===
- MBA (Master of Business Administration) (two years)

=== Department of Computer Applications ===
- MCA (Master of Computer Applications) (two years)

=== Department of Science and Humanities ===
- General Engineering

== School of Animation & Gaming ==
ESEC School of Animation and Gaming,

- Diploma in Animation and Gaming ( 1 Year)
- Diploma in Animation and VFX (6 Months)
- Multimedia in Animation (3 Months)
- Film Making and VFX ( 3 Months)
- AR & VR ( 3 Months)

== Facilities ==
=== Library ===
The college has a central library with 45, 934 volumes, 11, 531 titles, 111 Indian periodicals and 107 international periodicals AICTE consortium online journals 656. The library has a collection of more than 3,096 CDs and DVDs Books for the preparation of competitive exams like GATE, TOEFL, GRE, GMAT, Defence Service and Civil Service are in reference and issue sections.

Also, many of the academic professors from Erode Sengunthar Engineering College authored many quality books like 'Cases of AI Ethics In Business' available in Google Books & leading Publications.

=== NPTEL (National Programme on Technology Enhanced Learning) ===
NPTEL provides E-learning through online and video courses in Engineering, Science and Humanities streams. The mission of NPTEL is to enhance the quality of engineering education in the country.

A center for a national programme on Technology-Enhanced Learning functions in the college.

=== Physical education ===
- Multi-purpose standard 400 meters mud track with field measurements
- Multi-station gym: 12 stations
- Volleyball courts with flood lights and gallery
- Table tennis boards
- Cricket ground
- Basketball, concrete court
- Ball badminton court
- Handball court
- Football field
- Hockey field

Hostel There are in-campus hostels for boys and girls: two each for boys girls.

=== Professional societies ===
There are programmes on Public Awareness, National Integration, Career development, Science Exhibitions.

The institution is an institutional member in the following professional societies:

- Institute of Electrical and Electronics Engineers
- Indian Society for Technical Education Staff Chapter
- Indian Society for Technical Education Student Chapter
- Computer Society of India
- Institution of Engineers (India)
- Indian Green Building Council
- Indian Institute of Chemical Engineers (IIChE) students’ chapter
- Indian Concrete Institute students’ chapter
