= A. M. Raja (politician) =

Indian politician

Member of the Tamil Nadu Legislative Assembly
- In office 1967–1977
- Preceded by: N. K. Ranganayaki
- Succeeded by: M. R. Soundarrajan
- Constituency: Bhavani

Personal details
- Born: 1928
- Died: 2022 (aged 93–94)
- Party: Dravida Munnetra Kazhagam
- Occupation: Indian politician

A. M. Raja (Ayyampalayam Masagounder Rajagounder) is an Indian politician born in 1928 and former Member of the Legislative Assembly of Tamil Nadu. He was elected to the Tamil Nadu legislative assembly as a Dravida Munnetra Kazhagam candidate from Bhavani constituency in 1967, and 1971 elections. He was one of the first in his family to graduate from University (with a degree in Tamil History and Literature). He spent much of his adult life in Madras, where he owned construction companies that built bridges, and corporate buildings. His lifelong interest in politics made him an important person at the statewide level especially with education reform and bringing access to higher education for all castes. He had many advisory rolls at the state level in the DMK, and was a personal acquaintance of several Chief Ministers. L.

== Electoral performance ==
Election	Constituency	Political party	Result	Vote %	Opposition			Ref
Election	Constituency	Political party	Result	Vote %	Candidate	Political party	Vote %	Ref
1962	Bhavani	DMK	Lost	34.37%	N. K. Ranganayaki	INC	49.10%	
1967	Bhavani	DMK	Won	65.16%	P. K. Mudaliar	INC	33.07%	
1971	Bhavani	DMK	Won	59.36%	P. Kuppusamy Mudaliar	INC	39.26%	
