= Bharathi Vidya Bhavan =

Location
- Erode, Tamil Nadu; India; 11.322694°N 77.6758476°E

Information
- Principal: Mr.R.Sridhar

Bharathi Vidya Bhavan is a co-educational residential senior secondary school in Erode in the state of Tamil Nadu, India. It was founded in 1978. The school is run by the family of Bharat Ratna Chidambaram Subramaniam, particularly his eldest son-in-law Dr. L.M. Ramakrishnan who serves as the school's correspondent, and his daughter Dr. Aruna Ramakrishnan as its president. It is the highest-ranked school in the Erode district in terms of academics and sports. The school is administrated by its principal R. Sridhar and its vice-principal S. Ramesh Kumar.

It follows the State Board of Tamil Nadu. It has two branches in Erode which follows Central Board of Secondary Education - The BVB School and CS Academy

In 2012 the Bharathi Vidya Bhavan was the most expensive school in Chennai.

== Classes ==
There are separate buildings for each block (KG, Class 1 to Class 5, Class 6 to Class 8, Class 9 and Class 10, Class 11 and Class 12) adequately separated.

Primary Block

The Primary Block has labs for the subjects of English, Maths, Computer Science and Science. It has weekly classes for Music, Drawing, Hindi and GK. Class 1 to Class 3 deal with Crayons while Class 4 and Class 5 deal with watercolours paint in their Drawing Classes. They also have 2 PT classes and 2 Swimming classes per week. They have an English Reading Class to improve their vocal skills. They have Computer Science as a supplementary subject to improve their technical skills. They also have Library periods to get them introduced with books. There is a hall having projector and AC facilities named the Gandhi Hall (in honour of Mahatma Gandhi)

Middle Block

The Middle Block has labs for the subjects of Physical Science, Biology, Social Sciences,Computer Science, Craft, English and Maths.The Middle Block introduces Crafts Period for Class 6 and Class 7. Class 6 and Class 7 deal with Water Colours while Class 8 is introduced to Acrylic Paint. The students in the Middle Block are taught the basics of coding in their Computer Science classes.

Secondary Block

The Secondary Block has labs for English, Physics, Chemistry and Biology. The Computer Science Class is suspended for these 2 years only to be re-introduces in Class 11. There is a mini-auditorium with digital screen, AC and stage facilities named the CS Hall (in honour of late C. Subramanium) and a hall for writing exams which can accommodate over 150 students named the Rajaji Hall (in honour of C. Rajagopaalachari).

Higher Secondary Block

The Higher Secondary Block has labs for Physics, Chemistry, Biology and Computer Science. There are rooms equipped with projectors and AC for visual learning. There is hall for writing exams which can accommodate nearly 200 students named the Kamaraj Hall (in honour of Kamarajar). The student of Class 11 can opt between 3 groups - Biology Maths, Computer Science Maths and Commerce (Business Maths or Computer Applications). They can also choose their Second Language from Tamil and Sanskrit.

The school has 4 basketball courts (1 wood-floored, 1 cement-floored, 2 thar-floored), clay tennis court, 3 volleyball courts (1 thar-floored, 2 clay floored), swimming pool, 2 cricket nets, assembly area, mini stadium and a football ground.

== Houses ==
The school students are divided into four houses and interhouse competitions are held each year. Students are nominated as office bearers leading the houses in order to teach leadership qualities. The name of the houses are Gandhi, Tagore, Nehru and Vivekananda.

== Extra-curricular activities ==
Students attending the school are often referred as Bharathian. Bharathians play inter-school matches in sports like basketball, volleyball, tennis, table tennis, football and athletics. It has an indoor stadium for basketball, badminton, and volleyball.

Co-curricular activities include drawing, painting, handicraft, sewing and vocal and instrumental music.
