= P. G. Narayanan =

Indian politician

Thiru P. G. Narayanan an Indian politician from All India Anna Dravida Munnetra Kazhagam party is an incumbent member of the Tamil Nadu Legislative Assembly from the Bhavani constituency. He is a former Member of the Parliament of India representing Tamil Nadu in the Rajya Sabha, the upper house of the Indian Parliament.

He was elected to the Tamil Nadu legislative assembly as an Anna Dravida Munnetra Kazhagam candidate from Bhavani constituency in 1980, and 1984 elections.

== Electoral performance ==
Election	Constituency	Political party	Result	Vote %	Opposition			Ref
Election	Constituency	Political party	Result	Vote %	Candidate	Political party	Vote %	Ref
1980	Bhavani	AIADMK	Won	60.89%	M. P. V. Madeswaran	INC	31.61%	
1984	Bhavani	AIADMK	Won	63.30%	N. K. K. Periasamy	DMK	35.93%	
2011	Bhavani	AIADMK	Won	54.28%	K. S. Mahendran	PMK	36.81%	
