= S. Selvakumara Chinnayan =

Indian politician

S. Selvakumarachinnayan

Member of the India Parliament for Erode
- In office 1 September 2014 – 23 May 2019
- Preceded by: A. Ganeshamurthi
- Succeeded by: A. Ganeshamurthi
- Constituency: Erode

Personal details
- Born: 1 September 1958 (age 68) Erode, Tamil Nadu
- Party: All India Anna Dravida Munnetra Kazhagam
- Spouse: Smt. Uma Maheswari
- Children: 2
- Education: Loyola College, Chennai, Sri Venkateswara University, Madras Law College
- Occupation: Advocate
- As of 17 December, 2016

Selvakumara Chinnayan S (b 1960) is an Indian politician and Member of Parliament elected from Tamil Nadu. He is elected to the Lok Sabha from Erode constituency as an Anna Dravida Munnetra Kazhagam candidate in 2014 election.

He is the lawyers' wing secretary of the party's Erode urban unit and was a public prosecutor during 2001–2006.
