= Bhavani Assembly constituency =

State Legislative Assembly Constituency in Tamil Nadu

Coordinates: 11.45°N 77.68°E

Bhavani
- Constituency No. 104 for the Tamil Nadu Legislative Assembly

Constituency details
- Country: India
- Region: South India
- State: Tamil Nadu
- District: Erode
- Lok Sabha constituency: Tiruppur
- Established: 1951
- Total electors: 2,23,221

Member of Legislative Assembly
- 17th Tamil Nadu Legislative Assembly
- Incumbent K. C. Karuppannan
- Party: AIADMK
- Alliance: NDA
- Elected year: 2026

Bhavani is a state assembly constituency in Erode district in Tamil Nadu. Its State Assembly Constituency number is 104. It is one of the 234 State Legislative Assembly Constituencies in Tamil Nadu, in India.

It covers Bhavani and some parts of Erode City.

It is included in Tiruppur Lok Sabha constituency.

== Demographics ==
The constituency has a significant number of Vanniyar, Kongu Vellalar Gounder, and Senguntha Mudaliar, Reddiyar and Adi Dravida communities.

== Members of the Legislative Assembly ==
Election	Member	Party
1952	B. K. Nallaswami	Indian National Congress
1957	G. G. Gurumurthi	Indian National Congress
1957	P. G. Manickam	Indian National Congress
1962	N. K. Ranganayaki	Indian National Congress
1967	A. M. Raja	Dravida Munnetra Kazhagam
1971	A. M. Raja	Dravida Munnetra Kazhagam
1977	M. R. Soundarrajan	All India Anna Dravida Munnetra Kazhagam
1980	P. G. Narayanan	All India Anna Dravida Munnetra Kazhagam
1984	P. G. Narayanan	All India Anna Dravida Munnetra Kazhagam
1989	G. G. Gurumoorthy	Independent politician
1991	S. Muthusamy	All India Anna Dravida Munnetra Kazhagam
1996	S. N. Balasubramanian	Tamil Maanila Congress
2001	K. C. Karuppannan	All India Anna Dravida Munnetra Kazhagam
2006	K. V. Ramanathan	Pattali Makkal Katchi
2011	P. G. Narayanan	All India Anna Dravida Munnetra Kazhagam
2016	K. C. Karuppannan	All India Anna Dravida Munnetra Kazhagam
2021	K. C. Karuppannan	All India Anna Dravida Munnetra Kazhagam
2026	K. C. Karuppannan	All India Anna Dravida Munnetra Kazhagam

Madras State

== Election results ==
=== Assembly election 2026 ===
2026 Tamil Nadu Legislative Assembly election : Bhavani
Party	Candidate	Votes	%	±%
AIADMK	K. C. Karuppannan	75,577	36.28%	New
TVK	Balakrishnan	68,181	32.73%	New
DMK	K. A. Chandrasekar	54,087	25.96%	▼13.37
NTK	R. Mohanadevi	6,195	2.97%	▼2.28
NOTA	None of the above	1,409	0.68%	▼0.36
Margin of victory		7,396	3.55%	▼7.75
Turnout		208,464	93.39%	▲9.00
Total valid votes		208,323		
Registered electors		223,221		▼6.49
AIADMK gain from AIADMK		Swing	▼14.35	

=== Assembly election 2021 ===
2021 Tamil Nadu Legislative Assembly election : Bhavani
Party	Candidate	Votes	%	±%
AIADMK	K. C. Karuppannan	100,915	50.63%	▲5.25
DMK	K. P. Durairaj	78,392	39.33%	▲7.12
NTK	M. Sathya	10,471	5.25%	▲4.31
MNM	K. Sadhanandham	4,221	2.12%	New
NOTA	None of the above	2,079	1.04%	▼0.40
Independent	P. Satheesh Kumar	1,224	0.61%	
Margin of victory		22,523	11.30%	▼1.87
Turnout		201,454	84.39%	▲1.51
Total valid votes		199,306		
Rejected ballots		69	0.03%	
Registered electors		238,721		▲4.67
AIADMK hold		Swing		

=== Assembly election 2016 ===
2016 Tamil Nadu Legislative Assembly election : Bhavani
Party	Candidate	Votes	%	±%
AIADMK	K. C. Karuppannan	85,748	45.38%	▼8.90
DMK	N. Sivakumar	60,861	32.21%	New
PMK	K. V. Ramanathan	20,727	10.97%	▼25.84
DMDK	P. Gopal	6,927	3.67%	New
KMDK	S. Chandrasekar	4,389	2.32%	New
NOTA	None of the above	2,716	1.44%	New
BJP	K. A. Shithi Vinayagan	2,480	1.31%	▼0.83
NTK	M. K. Seethalakshmi	1,784	0.94%	New
Margin of victory		24,887	13.17%	▼4.30
Turnout		189,013	82.88%	▲1.06
Total valid votes		188,950		
Rejected ballots		63	0.03%	▲0.03
Registered electors		228,069		▲16.27
AIADMK hold		Swing		

=== Assembly election 2011 ===
2011 Tamil Nadu Legislative Assembly election : Bhavani
Party	Candidate	Votes	%	±%
AIADMK	P. G. Narayanan	87,121	54.28%	▲16.76
PMK	K. S. Mahendran	59,080	36.81%	▼4.74
BJP	K. A. Shithi Vinayagan	3,432	2.14%	▲0.58
Loktantrik Samajwadi	M. Kumar	1,534	0.96%	New
Independent	K. Venkatachalam	1,325	0.83%	
Independent	D. Sathiya	1,270	0.79%	
Independent	K. Saravanan	1,236	0.77%	
BSP	S. Thangarasu	1,065	0.66%	▼0.11
Independent	S. Ananthamoorthy	980	0.61%	
Margin of victory		28,041	17.47%	▲13.44
Turnout		160,504	81.82%	▲7.22
Total valid votes		160,496		
Rejected ballots		8	0.00%	
Registered electors		196,163		▲15.58
AIADMK gain from PMK		Swing	▲12.73	

=== Assembly election 2006 ===
2006 Tamil Nadu Legislative Assembly election : Bhavani
Party	Candidate	Votes	%	±%
PMK	K. V. Ramanathan	52,603	41.55%	New
AIADMK	K. C. Karuppannan	47,500	37.52%	New
DMDK	P. Gopal	17,001	13.43%	New
BJP	K. A. P. Palanisamy	1,971	1.56%	New
Independent	P. K. Aruljothi	1,549	1.22%	
Independent	V. M. Perumal	1,540	1.22%	
Independent	P. Rangasamy	1,087	0.86%	
BSP	S. K. Kandasamy	971	0.77%	New
Independent	E. Raju	969	0.77%	
Margin of victory		5,103	4.03%	▼25.66
Turnout		126,612	74.60%	▲13.84
Total valid votes		126,612		
Registered electors		169,720		▼6.83
PMK gain from AIADMK		Swing	▼16.65	

=== Assembly election 2001 ===
2001 Tamil Nadu Legislative Assembly election : Bhavani
Party	Candidate	Votes	%	±%
AIADMK	K. C. Karuppannan	64,405	58.20%	▲32.77
PNK	J. Sudhanandhen	31,546	28.50%	New
MDMK	S. K. Thiyagarajan	8,921	8.06%	New
Independent	V. N. Velmurugan	2,305	2.08%	
Independent	M. Karuppusamy	1,159	1.05%	
JD(S)	C. M. Arumugham	825	0.75%	New
Margin of victory		32,859	29.69%	▲3.90
Turnout		110,674	60.76%	▼11.55
Total valid votes		110,671		
Registered electors		182,155		▲12.44
AIADMK gain from TMC(M)		Swing	▲6.97	

=== Assembly election 1996 ===
1996 Tamil Nadu Legislative Assembly election : Bhavani
Party	Candidate	Votes	%	±%
TMC(M)	S. N. Balasubramanian	57,256	51.23%	New
AIADMK	K. S. Manivannan	28,427	25.43%	New
PMK	M. P. Venkatachalam	18,768	16.79%	▲0.46
CPI(M)	P. Palanisamy	4,216	3.77%	New
Independent	A. M. Nallasamy	758	0.68%	
Margin of victory		28,829	25.79%	▼14.62
Turnout		117,152	72.31%	▲4.10
Total valid votes		111,769		
Rejected ballots		5,540	4.73%	▲1.65
Registered electors		162,004		▲6.93
TMC(M) gain from AIADMK		Swing	▼10.01	

=== Assembly election 1991 ===
1991 Tamil Nadu Legislative Assembly election : Bhavani
Party	Candidate	Votes	%	±%
AIADMK	S. Muthusamy	61,337	61.24%	New
DMK	M. C. Duraisamy	20,867	20.84%	▼1.80
PMK	V. V. Ramanathan	16,358	16.33%	New
Margin of victory		40,470	40.41%	▲20.86
Turnout		103,332	68.21%	▲5.52
Total valid votes		100,153		
Rejected ballots		3,179	3.08%	▲0.66
Registered electors		151,501		▲7.49
AIADMK gain from Independent		Swing	▲19.06	

=== Assembly election 1989 ===
1989 Tamil Nadu Legislative Assembly election : Bhavani
Party	Candidate	Votes	%	±%
Independent	G. G. Gurumoorthy	36,371	42.18%	
DMK	P. S. Kiruttinasamy	19,518	22.64%	▼13.29
INC	S. N. Balasubramanian	19,291	22.37%	New
AIADMK	P. N. Govindan	9,125	10.58%	New
Independent	K. Palanisamy	586	0.68%	
Margin of victory		16,853	19.55%	▼7.83
Turnout		88,362	62.69%	▼14.57
Total valid votes		86,226		
Rejected ballots		2,136	2.42%	▼1.43
Registered electors		140,948		▲13.59
Independent gain from AIADMK		Swing	▼21.12	

=== Assembly election 1984 ===
1984 Tamil Nadu Legislative Assembly election : Bhavani
Party	Candidate	Votes	%	±%
AIADMK	P. G. Narayanan	58,350	63.30%	▲2.41
DMK	N. K. K. Periasamy	33,116	35.93%	New
Independent	M. N. Krishnaswamy	709	0.77%	
Margin of victory		25,234	27.38%	▼1.89
Turnout		95,866	77.26%	▲15.69
Total valid votes		92,175		
Rejected ballots		3,691	3.85%	▲2.27
Registered electors		124,086		▲3.69
AIADMK hold		Swing		

=== Assembly election 1980 ===
1980 Tamil Nadu Legislative Assembly election : Bhavani
Party	Candidate	Votes	%	±%
AIADMK	P. G. Narayanan	44,152	60.89%	New
INC	M. P. V. Madeswaran	22,926	31.61%	▲8.48
JP	N. Manickam	4,719	6.51%	New
Independent	E. Chinna Gounder	720	0.99%	
Margin of victory		21,226	29.27%	▲23.84
Turnout		73,679	61.57%	▼5.13
Total valid votes		72,517		
Rejected ballots		1,162	1.58%	▲0.21
Registered electors		119,674		▲7.56
AIADMK gain from AIADMK		Swing	▲29.48	

=== Assembly election 1977 ===
1977 Tamil Nadu Legislative Assembly election : Bhavani
Party	Candidate	Votes	%	±%
AIADMK	M. R. Soundarrajan	22,989	31.41%	New
JP	G. G. Gurumoorthy	19,013	25.98%	New
INC	S. N. Balasubramanian	16,931	23.13%	New
DMK	N. K. K. Periasamy	14,258	19.48%	▼39.88
Margin of victory		3,976	5.43%	▼14.67
Turnout		74,210	66.70%	▼2.33
Total valid votes		73,191		
Rejected ballots		1,019	1.37%	▲1.37
Registered electors		111,262		▲14.86
AIADMK gain from DMK		Swing	▼27.95	

=== Assembly election 1971 ===
1971 Tamil Nadu Legislative Assembly election : Bhavani
Party	Candidate	Votes	%	±%
DMK	A. M. Raja	38,527	59.36%	▼5.80
INC	P. Kuppusamy Mudaliar	25,480	39.26%	New
Independent	P. Manickkam	893	1.38%	
Margin of victory		13,047	20.10%	▼12.00
Turnout		66,868	69.03%	▼7.76
Total valid votes		64,900		
Registered electors		96,870		▲7.29
DMK hold		Swing		

=== Assembly election 1967 ===
1967 Madras State Legislative Assembly election : Bhavani
Party	Candidate	Votes	%	±%
DMK	A. M. Raja	43,353	65.16%	▲30.79
INC	P. K. Mudaliar	21,999	33.07%	▼16.03
Independent	C. V. V. Samy	1,177	1.77%	
Margin of victory		21,354	32.10%	▲17.37
Turnout		69,336	76.79%	▲8.24
Total valid votes		66,529		
Registered electors		90,290		▼11.72
DMK gain from INC		Swing	▲16.06	

=== Assembly election 1962 ===
1962 Madras State Legislative Assembly election : Bhavani
Party	Candidate	Votes	%	±%
INC	N. K. Ranganayaki	32,739	49.10%	▼11.99
DMK	A. M. Raja	22,919	34.37%	New
CPI	J. I. Mohammad Ibrahim	6,649	9.97%	New
SWA	T. A. Kuppusami Chettiar	1,588	2.38%	New
Independent	S. Vaiyapuri Madali	1,200	1.80%	
Independent	M. Sayad Abdul Razak	1,010	1.51%	
Margin of victory		9,820	14.73%	▼0.84
Turnout		70,111	68.55%	▼15.36
Total valid votes		66,681		
Registered electors		102,272		▼41.85
INC hold		Swing		

=== Assembly election 1957 ===
1957 Madras State Legislative Assembly election : Bhavani
Party	Candidate	Votes	%	±%
INC	G. G. Gurumurthi	49,926	33.83%	▼2.53
INC	P. G. Manickam	40,224	27.26%	▼9.10
Independent	K. Komaraswami Gounder	26,944	18.26%	
Independent	A. Subramanian	17,580	11.91%	
Independent	K. M. Chenroyam	12,899	8.74%	
Margin of victory		22,982	15.57%	▲9.19
Turnout		147,573	83.91%	▲13.82
Total valid votes		147,573		
Registered electors		175,870		▲140.36
INC hold		Swing		

=== Assembly election 1952 ===
1952 Madras State Legislative Assembly election : Bhavani
Party	Candidate	Votes	%	±%
INC	B. K. Nallaswami	18,649	36.36%	New
TTP	N. Palaniswami Gounder	15,375	29.98%	New
Independent	T. M. Sambuselli Gounder	11,321	22.08%	New
CPI	B. N. Balu	5,938	11.58%	New
Margin of victory		3,274	6.38%	
Turnout		51,283	70.09%	
Total valid votes		51,283		
Registered electors		73,169		
INC win (new seat)				
