= S. N. Balasubramanian =

Indian politician

S. N. Balasubramanian was elected to the Tamil Nadu Legislative Assembly from the Bhavani constituency in the 1996 elections. He was a candidate of the Tamil Maanila Congress party.

== Electoral performance ==
Election	Constituency	Political party	Result	Vote %	Opposition			Ref
Election	Constituency	Political party	Result	Vote %	Candidate	Political party	Vote %	Ref
1977	Bhavani	INC	Lost	23.13%	M. R. Soundarrajan	AIADMK	31.41%	
1989	Bhavani	INC	Lost	22.37%	G. G. Gurumoorthy	Independent	42.18%	
1996	Bhavani	TMC(M)	Won	51.23%	K. S. Manivannan	AIADMK	25.43%	
