= Thudupathi =

Town in India

Coordinates: 11.302°N 77.550°E

Thudupathi is a town in the taluk of Perundurai in the district of Erode in Tamil Nadu, India. The distance between Perundurai and the village is 5 kilometers and from NH47 it is 2.5 kilometers. It is the site of S Samy Decorators. There are government elementary and Higher secondary school located which has a proud of producing District level rank holders every year.

This village holds an ancient Perumal temple. There are engineering colleges, medical colleges, auditing colleges located around this village.

== Etymology ==
The word "Thudupathi" has emerged from the union of two Tamil words "Thuduppu" meaning bouquet of flowers and "Pathi" meaning town.

== Township ==
The town of Thudupathi encloses the following 12 villages: 1. Palakkarai 2. Thudupathi North 3. Thudupathi South 4.T. Olappalayam 5. Thulukkapalayam 6. Thoppu palayam 7. Goundam palayam 8. Sanarpalayam 9. Chinnamallampalayam 10. Pallapalayam 11. Veerachipalayam 12. SeerangaGoundanPalayam
