= J. Sudhanandhen Mudaliyar =

Indian businessman and philanthropist

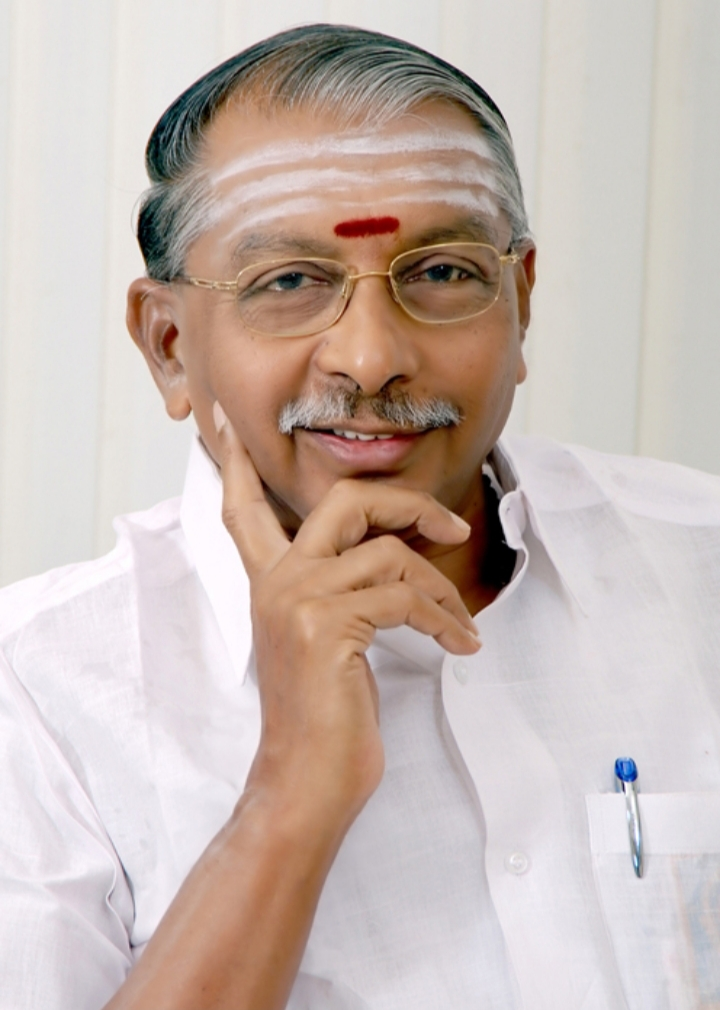
- Born: Jaganatha Mudaliyar; 21 September 1944 (age 81); Erode, Tamil Nadu, India
- Occupation(s): Founder of Erode Sengunthar Engineering College, MPNMJ college, Philanthropist, textile merchant, Educationalist.
- Spouse: Vasantha Sudhanandhen
- Parent: M.Jaganathan Mudaliyar - Muthulakshmi

J. Sudhanandhen Mudaliyar (born 21 September 1944) was an Indian philanthropist, educationalist, and textile merchant.

== Early life ==
Sudhanandhen was born into the Sengunthar Kaikola Mudaliyar (Mayan Kothiram) family in 1944. He completed his schooling at Kalaimagal Kalvi Nilayam, Erode. He continued his high school at Sengunthar Higher Secondary School, Erode. He completed his PUC at PSG College of Arts and Science, then he graduated B.Sc. from The New College, Madras. He was an adherent follower of M.P. Nachimuthu Mudaliar, a social activist.

== Career ==
He was president of Erode Weavers’ Cooperative Society (EROTEX) for many years.

He was the seventh President of the South Indian Sengunthar Mahajana Sangam from 1987 to 2009.

He founded and developed the Erode Sengunthar Engineering College and M.P.Nachimuthu M.Jaganathan Engineering College in Erode district of Tamil Nadu state.
