= K. V. Ramalingam =

Indian politician

K. V. Ramalingam is an Indian politician and former member of the Tamil Nadu legislative assembly elected from Erode West constituency in 2011 and 2016. He served as the Minister of Public Works Department of Tamil Nadu from 2011 to 2013 He represents Anna Dravida Munnetra Kazhagam party.

He was also the Member of Rajyasabha from June 2010 to May 2011 in AIADMK.He later joined TVK in May 2026.
