= Vellode Bird Sanctuary =

Bird sanctuary in Erode District, Tamil Nadu, India

- IUCN category IV (habitat/species management area)
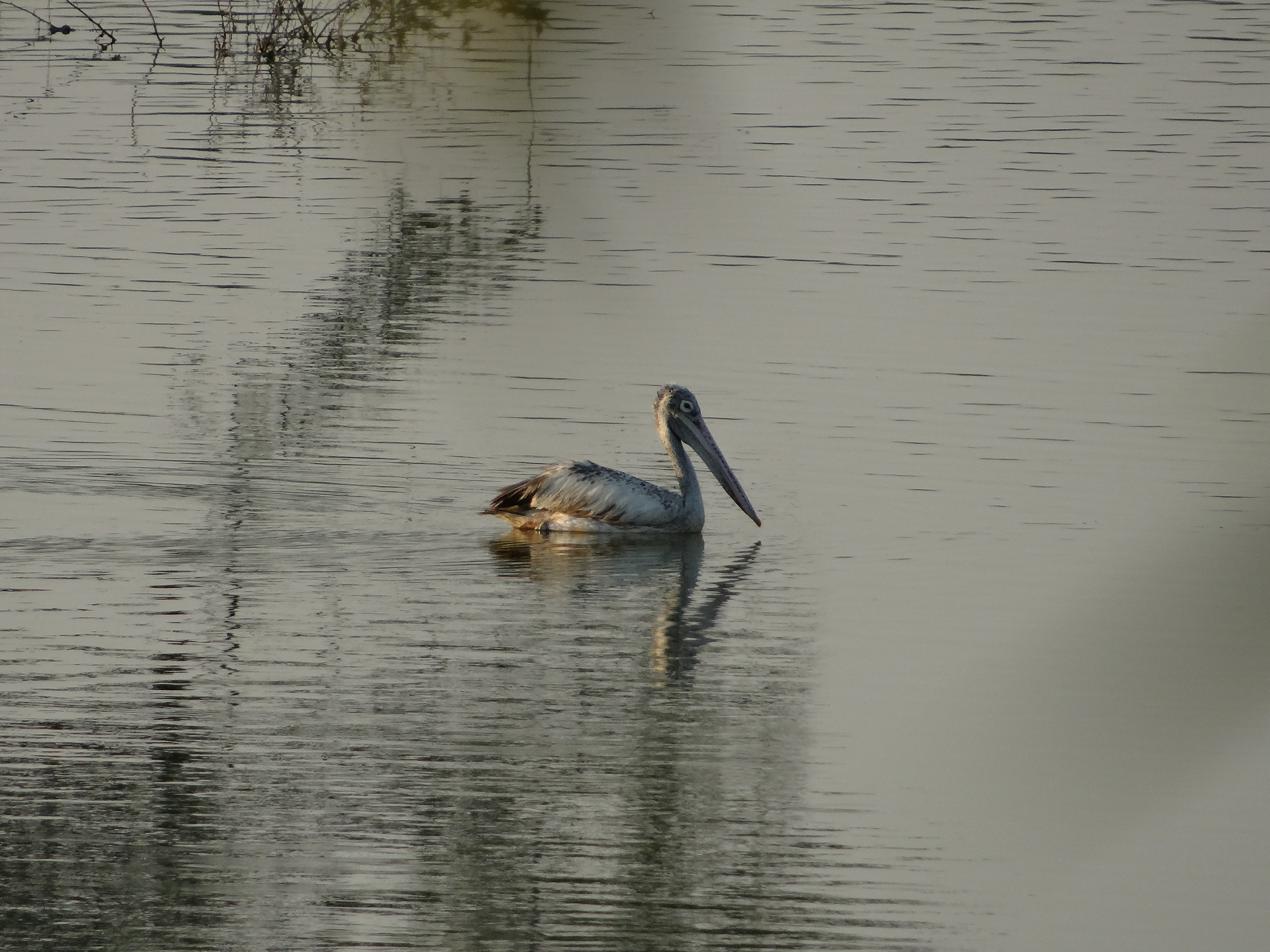

- Location within Tamil Nadu Location within India
- Interactive map of Vellode Bird Sanctuary
- Location: Erode District, Tamil Nadu, India
- Coordinates: 11°15′9″N 77°39′8″E
- Established: 1996
- Governing body: Ministry of Environment and Forests, Government of India

Ramsar Wetland
- Official name: Vellode Bird Sanctuary
- Designated: 8 April 2022
- Reference no.: 2475

Vellode Birds Sanctuary is a bird sanctuary located in Erode District, Tamil Nadu, India. The sanctuary covers an area of .77 km^{2} (0.30 mi^{2}). The sanctuary is located near Vellode, about 12 km from Erode. It has been designated as a protected Ramsar site since 2022.

The sanctuary is built around Periyakulam lake surrounded with bushes. More than 20,000 birds visit during the migration period from November to March. The sanctuary features thousands of birds coming from various countries, some of which can be easily identified. The bird species include Black-capped kingfisher, Bonelli's eagle, Western marsh harrier, Black-naped oriole, Bar-headed goose, Black-tailed godwit, Barn swallow, Woolly-necked stork, Eurasian spoonbill, Greater spotted eagle, Blue-tailed bee-eater, Little stint, Spot-billed pelican, purple swamphen, and Yellow wagtail.
