= N. K. K. Periasamy =

Indian politician

N. K. K. Periasamy is an Indian politician. He is a former Government of Tamil Nadu Handlooms and Textiles minister from 1996 to 2001. He was elected to Tamil Nadu legislative assembly from Erode constituency in 1996 election.

== Electoral performance ==
Election	Constituency	Political party	Result	Vote %	Opposition			Ref
Election	Constituency	Political party	Result	Vote %	Candidate	Political party	Vote %	Ref
1977	Bhavani	DMK	Lost	19.48%	M. R. Soundarrajan	AIADMK	31.41%	
1984	Bhavani	DMK	Lost	35.93%	P. G. Narayanan	AIADMK	63.30%	
1996	Erode	DMK	Won	59.80%	S. Muthusamy	AIADMK	32.48%	
2001	Erode	DMK	Lost	38.98%	K. S. Thennarasu	AIADMK	52.40%	
