= Kathirampatti =

Village in India

- Village
- Kathirampatti, Erode (Tamil Nadu)
- Coordinates: 11.300500°N 77.654800°E
- Country: India
- State: Tamil Nadu
- District: Erode
- Elevation: 257 m (843 ft)

Languages
  - Official: Tamil
- Time zone: UTC+5:30 (IST)
- PIN: 638107
- Telephone code: 0424
- Vehicle registration: TN-56
- Nearest city: Erode

Kathirampatti is a Village Panchayat in Erode district, in the Indian state of Tamil Nadu. This Village Panchayat include villages namely Kathirampatti, Nanjanapuram, Pavalathampalayam & Chinna Medu.

Kathirampatti village is located within Erode panchayat union on the Erode-Perundurai highway almost in between Erode and Perundurai. It is connected to Erode, Perundurai, Nasiyanur and Chennimalai by the State Roads.

== Demographics ==
Kathirampatti Village has population of about 2000 of which majority are Kongu Vellala Goundars. Agriculture and Textile are the major occupations in this village. Surya Engineering College is located in Kathirampatti.And Erode Odai origin place also kathirampatti.

== Neighbourhoods ==
- Nasiyanur (7 km)
- Mettukkadai (1 km)
- Thindal (4 km)
- Nanjanapuram (2 km)
- Moolakkarai (3 km)
- Perundurai (9 km)
- Pavalathampalayam (4 km)
- Veppampalayam (3 km)
- Pazhayapalayam (6 km)
- Veerappampalayam (5 km)
- Sampath Nagar
