= A. V. Ilango =

Indian painter (born 1950)

- Born: 17 March 1950 (age 76); Gobichettipalayam
- Occupation: Painter

A. V. Ilango (born 17 March 1950) is an Indian painter.

== Life ==
He was born in Gobichettipalayam, a town in Tamil Nadu.

The rural background has left an indelible impression in his formative years. In India, art, culture, religion and rituals are interwoven in daily life. There is a fine line that separates Indian aesthetics and Hindu rituals. In traditional visual and performing arts, symbolism renders the classical arts more appealing for the initiated and the erudite while the folk arts are integrated by all in festivities. Ilango traces the bovine form and symbol as an idiom that is closely related to man from prehistory to the modern era.

In 2007, he founded Artspace in Chennai.
