= Diamond Jubilee Higher Secondary School =

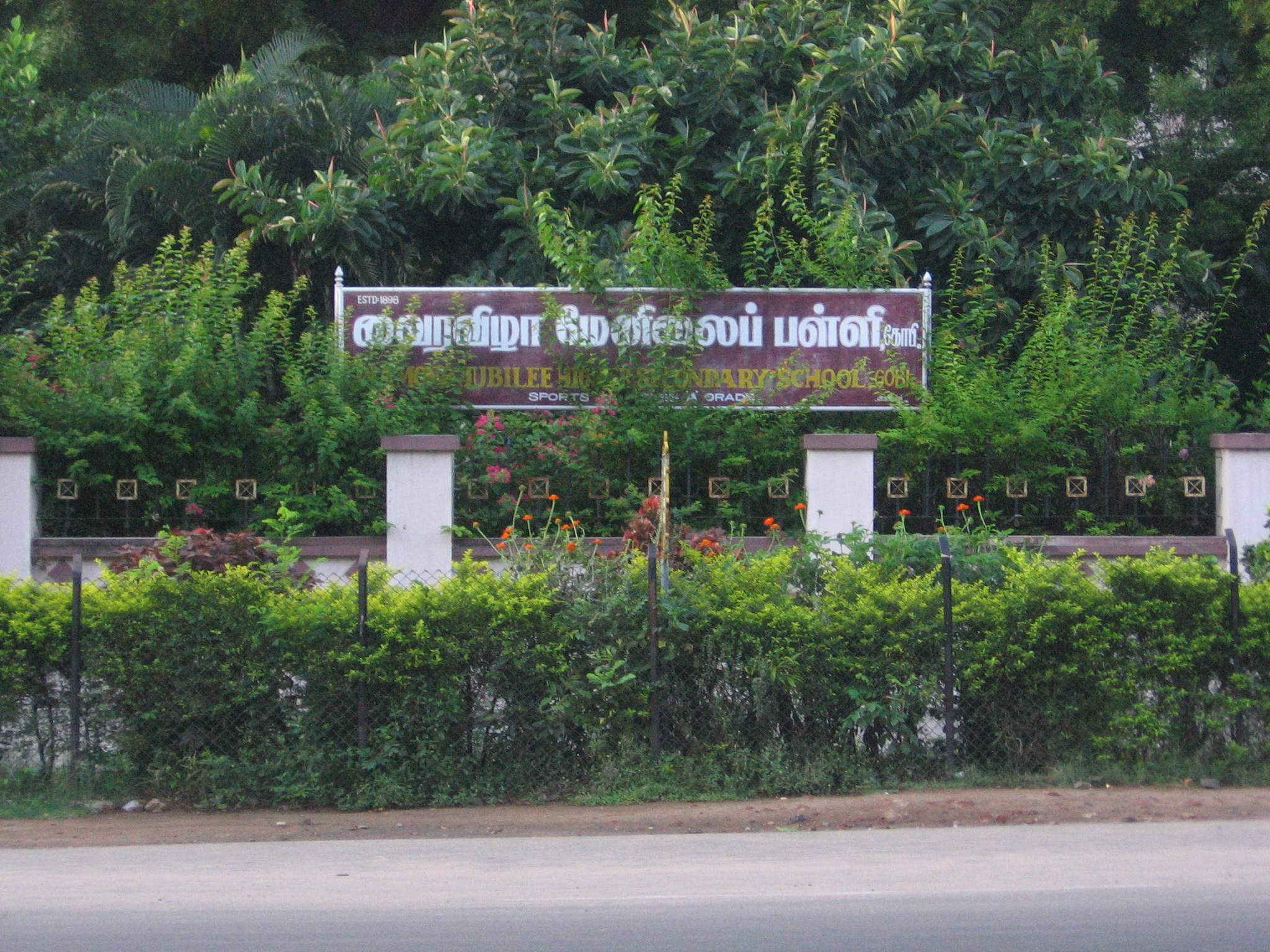

Location
- Cutchery Street; Gobichettipalayam, Tamil Nadu, 638452; India
- Coordinates: 11°27′13″N 77°26′18″E

Information
- School type: Government Aided
- Established: 1898
- School board: Tamil Nadu State Board
- School district: Erode
- Gender: Boys only
- Enrollment: ~1700
- Classes: 6th to 12th std
- Affiliation: Tamil Nadu Higher Secondary Board
- Website: http://diamondjubilee.in/

Diamond Jubilee Higher Secondary School (DJHSS) is a boys-only secondary school in Gobichettipalayam, in the Erode District of Tamil Nadu, India. It was established to commemorate the Diamond Jubilee of Queen Victoria in 1898.

== About the School ==
DJHSS has about 1700 students and 65 staff. It is a government aided school largely funded by the Tamil Nadu State Government, which pays the teachers' salaries. This enables the school to serve the educational requirements of the needy by offering education for a nominal fee. English medium curriculum was introduced in the year 1976. Mahatma Gandhi visited the school during the year 1927.

== Gallery ==
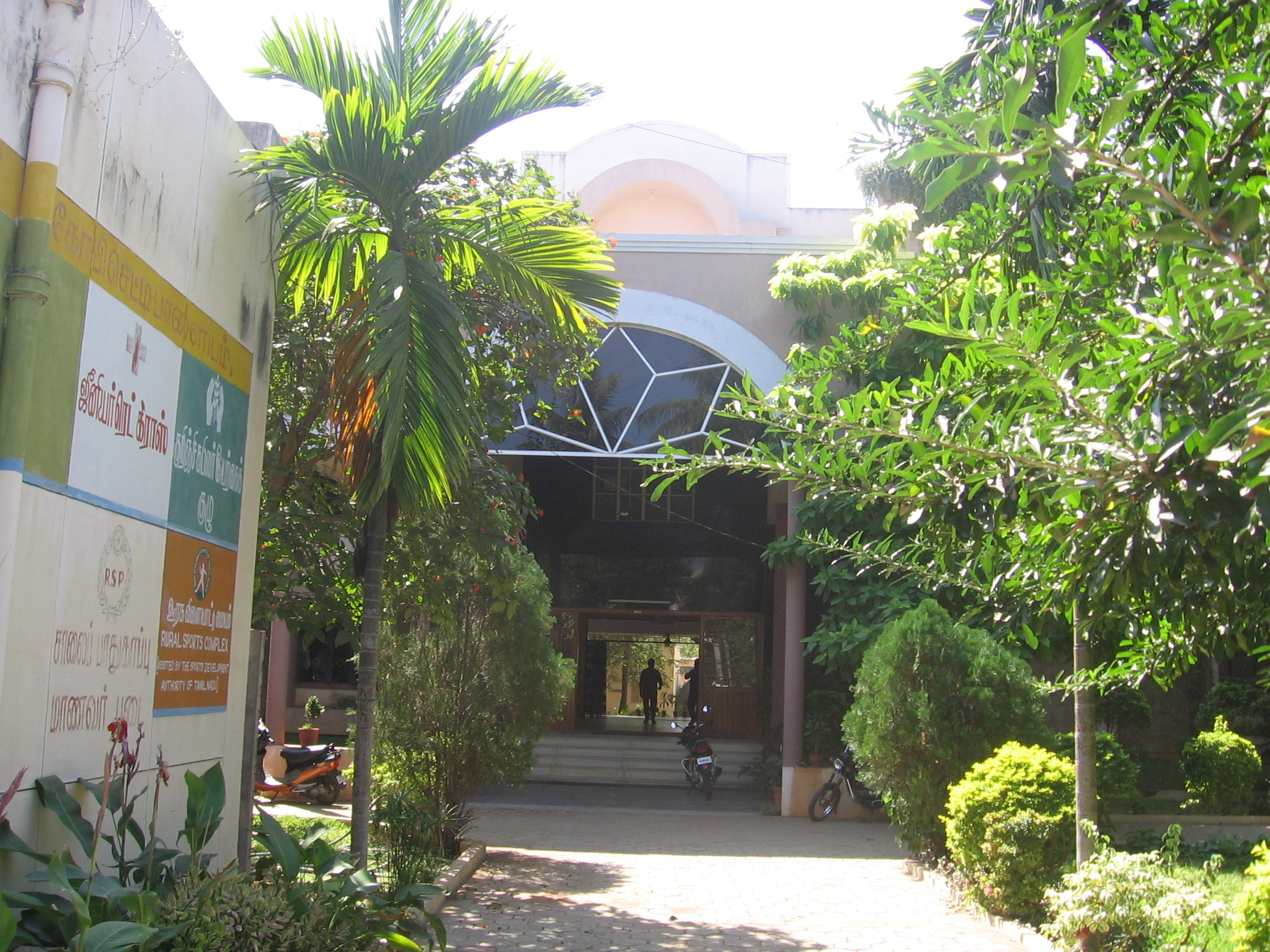
Administrative Building

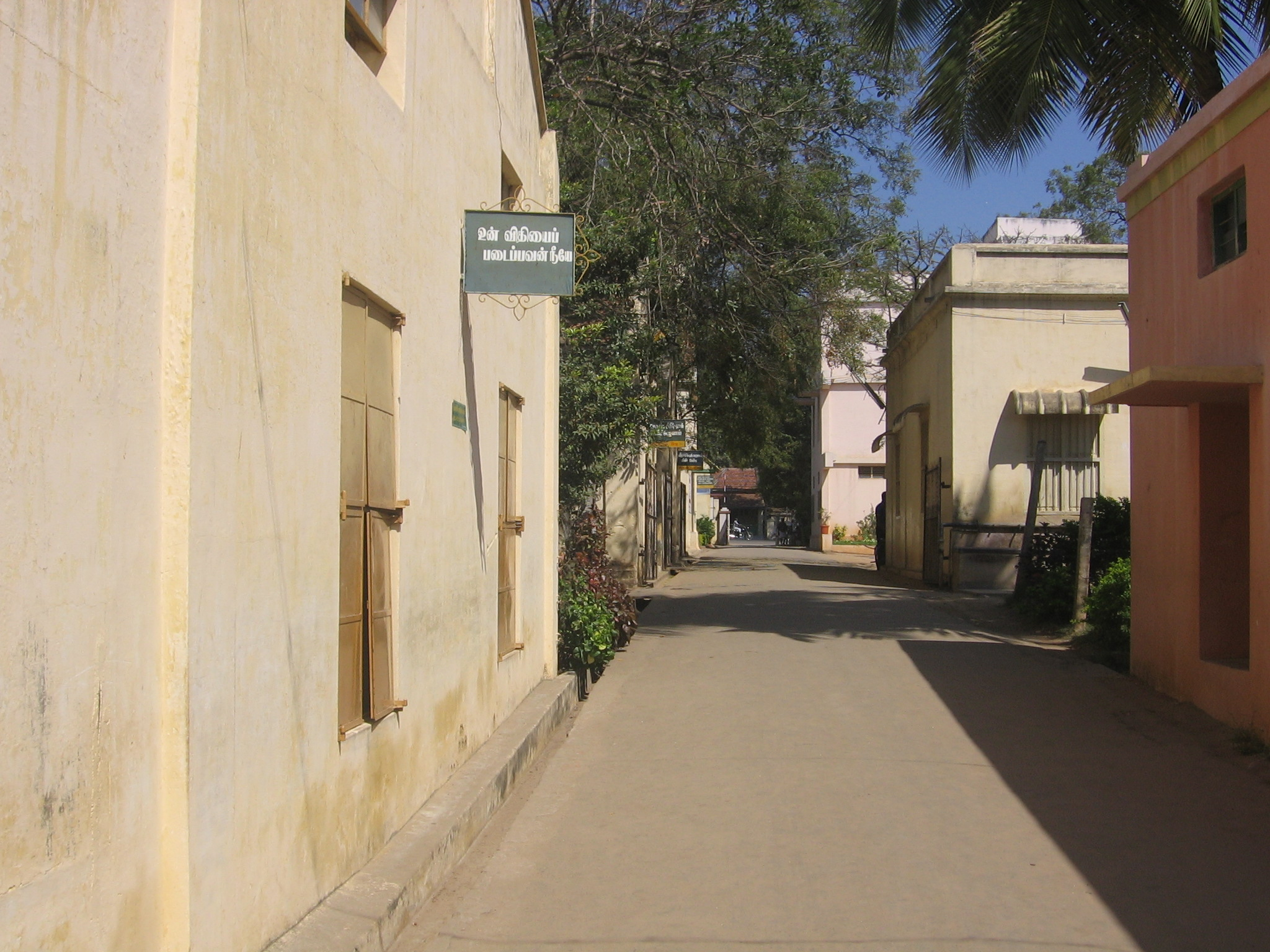
Inside the School

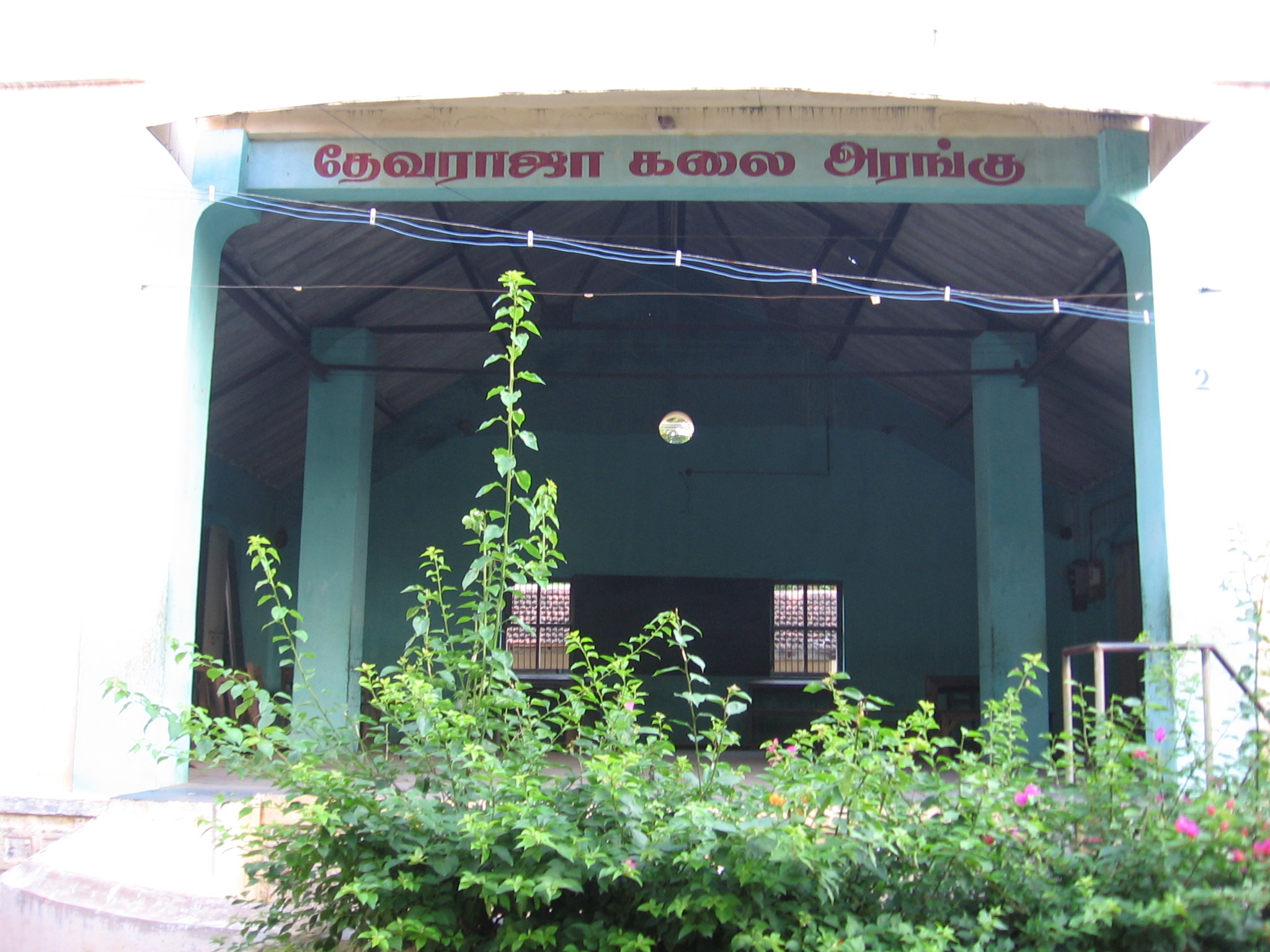
Open Auditorium

== Notable alumni ==
- Verghese Kurien, Father of the White Revolution, founder of AMUL, founder of the Gujarat Co-operative Milk Marketing Federation (GCMMF)
