= S. Muthusamy =

Indian politician

Minister for Prohibition & Excise (Tamil Nadu)
- In office 16 June 2023 – 28 September 2024
- Chief Minister: M. K. Stalin
- Preceded by: V. Senthil Balaji
- Succeeded by: V. Senthil Balaji

Minister for Housing and Urban Development (Tamil Nadu)
- In office 7 May 2021 – 5 May 2026
- Chief Minister: M. K. Stalin
- Preceded by: O. Panneerselvam

Minister for Health (Tamil Nadu)
- In office 24 June 1991 – 12 May 1996
- Chief Minister: J. Jayalalithaa
- Preceded by: K. Ponmudy
- Succeeded by: Arcot N. Veerasamy

Minister for Transport (Tamil Nadu)
- In office 9 June 1980 – 24 December 1987
- Chief Minister: M. G. Ramachandran
- Preceded by: C. Ponnaiyan
- Succeeded by: Himself
- In office 24 December 1987 – 7 January 1988
- Chief Minister: V. R. Nedunchezhiyan
- Preceded by: Himself
- Succeeded by: Himself
- In office 7 January 1988 – 30 January 1988
- Chief Minister: V. N. Janaki
- Preceded by: Himself
- Succeeded by: M. Kannappan

Member of Tamil Nadu Legislative Assembly
- In office 2021–2026
- Constituency: Erode West constituency
- In office June 1991 – May 1996
- Constituency: Bhavani constituency
- In office June 1977 – January 1988
- Constituency: Erode constituency

Personal details
- Born: 16 October 1948 (age 77) Nedungulam, Salem, Tamil Nadu, India
- Party: Dravida Munnetra Kazhagam
- Other political affiliations: All India Anna Dravida Munnetra Kazhagam

S. Muthusamy an Indian politician Minister for Prohibition & Excise (Tamil Nadu) and Member of the Legislative Assembly. He was elected to the Tamil Nadu legislative assembly as an Anna Dravida Munnetra Kazhagam candidate from Erode constituency in 1977, 1980 and 1984 elections and from Bhavani constituency in 1991 election. He served as Transport Minister in MGR cabinet and as health minister in Jayalalitha cabinet formed after 1991 election.

Muthusamy joined the DMK in 2010 and he was elected to the Tamil Nadu legislative assembly as a Dravida Munnetra Kazhagam candidate from Erode West Constituency in 2021.

== Activities ==
S. Muthusamy is an active local politician involved in the development of areas around Erode. Apart from implementing lot of basic infrastructure schemes for Erode and developing the Transport department up to a remarkable extent in Kongu region, Muthusamy was instrumental in bringing notable schemes like the new Erode Collector's office, Erode Bus Stand, IRTT (College of Technology), IRTT Medical college, New Bridge on Bhavani-Erode road etc. Muthusamy joined the DMK in 2010 and he is a member of the DMK High Command Executive committee and now he is a district secretary.

== Electoral performance ==
Election	Constituency	Political party	Result	Vote %	Opposition			Ref
Election	Constituency	Political party	Result	Vote %	Candidate	Political party	Vote %	Ref
1977	Erode	AIADMK	Won	43.09%	M. Subramanian	DMK	23.14%	
1980	Erode	AIADMK	Won	56.62%	R. Sainathan	INC	39.82%	
1984	Erode	AIADMK	Won	53.50%	Subbulakshmi Jagadeesan	DMK	44.81%	
1989	Erode	AIADMK	Lost	27.91%	Subbulakshmi Jagadeesan	DMK	41.40%	
1991	Bhavani	AIADMK	Won	61.24%	M. C. Duraisamy	DMK	20.84%	
1996	Erode	AIADMK	Lost	32.48%	N. K. K. Periasamy	DMK	59.80%	
2011	Erode (East)	DMK	Lost	43.01%	V. C. Chandhirakumar	DMDK	50.83%	
2016	Erode (West)	DMK	Lost	40.87%	K. V. Ramalingam	AIADMK	43.46%	
2021	Erode (West)	DMK	Won	49.49%	K. V. Ramalingam	AIADMK	38.64%	-
2026	Erode (West)	DMK	Lost	33.69%	Ananth Moghan. K. K	TVK	43.74%	-
