= Erode West Assembly constituency =

State Legislative Assembly Constituency in Tamil Nadu

Coordinates: 11.330°N 77.659°E

Erode (West)
- Constituency No. 99 for the Tamil Nadu Legislative Assembly

Constituency details
- Country: India
- Region: South India
- State: Tamil Nadu
- District: Erode
- Lok Sabha constituency: Erode
- Established: 2008
- Total electors: 2,50,217

Member of Legislative Assembly
- 17th Tamil Nadu Legislative Assembly
- Incumbent Ananth Moghan K.K.
- Party: TVK
- Elected year: 2026

Erode West or 'Erode (West)' is a state assembly constituency of Erode city in Erode district in the state of Tamil Nadu, India. Its State Assembly Constituency number is 99. It consists of portions of the Perundurai and Erode taluks. It is included in Erode Lok Sabha constituency. It is one of the 234 State Legislative Assembly Constituencies in Tamil Nadu.

This constituency was newly formed, in the year of 2008, by dividing the integrated Erode Assembly Constituency. Erode West was one of 17 assembly constituencies to have VVPAT facility with EVMs in 2016 Tamil Nadu Legislative Assembly election.

== Boundaries ==
It covers the western part of Erode City Corporation to the Perundurai Assembly constituency limit on the west and Modakkurichi Assembly constituency limit on the south; a part of the city is also covered by these two constituencies. Bhavani Assembly constituency also covers some part of the city in the north.

== Demographics ==
Gender demographic of Erode West as of 11.02.2021, taken during the State General election in 2021:

Year	Female	Male	Transgender	Total
2023	1,42,913	1,48,373	30	2,91,316

== Members of Legislative Assembly ==
Elected members from this constituency are as follows:

Year	Winner	Party
2011	K. V. Ramalingam	All India Anna Dravida Munnetra Kazhagam
2016	K. V. Ramalingam	All India Anna Dravida Munnetra Kazhagam
2021	S. Muthusamy	Dravida Munnetra Kazhagam
2026	K. K. Ananth Moghan	Tamilaga Vettri Kazhagam

== Election results ==
Vote share of winning candidates
2026	43.74%
2021	49.49%
2016	43.46%
2011	59.29%

=== 2026 ===
2026 Tamil Nadu Legislative Assembly election: Erode (West)
Party	Candidate	Votes	%	±%
TVK	K. K. Ananth Moghan	96,836	43.74	New
DMK	S. Muthusamy	74,586	33.69	▼15.80
BJP	M. Yuvaraja	38,185	17.25	New
NTK	N. Vijay	8,124	3.67	▼2.89
NOTA	NOTA	1,257	0.57	▼0.40
BSP	V. Palani	516	0.23	New
Party For The Rights Of Other Backward Classes	K. Kalaiyarasan	439	0.20	New
Independent	C. Rajendran	332	0.15	New
Independent	Shanmugam M.	235	0.11	New
Independent	A. Ramu	227	0.10	New
Independent	Moorthi P.	205	0.09	New
VSHWTMLK	M. Nataraj	177	0.08	New
TVK	V. Dhanalakshmi	163	0.07	New
Samaniya Makkal Nala Katchi	M. Rukmani	118	0.05	New
Margin of victory		22,250	10.05	▼0.80
Turnout		2,21,400	88.48	▲19.00
Registered electors		2,50,217		▼42,841
TVK gain from DMK		Swing	▲43.74	

=== 2021 ===
2021 Tamil Nadu Legislative Assembly election: Erode (West)
Party	Candidate	Votes	%	±%
DMK	S. Muthusamy	100,757	49.49%	8.62%
AIADMK	K. V. Ramalingam	78,668	38.64%	−4.82%
NTK	Chandra Kumar P	13,353	6.56%	5.27%
MNM	Durai Sevugan	8,107	3.98%	
NOTA	Nota	1,968	0.97%	−0.83%
Margin of victory		22,089	10.85%	8.26%
Turnout		2,03,611	69.48%	−4.43%
Rejected ballots		490	0.24%	
Registered electors		2,93,058		
DMK gain from AIADMK		Swing	6.03%	

=== 2016 ===
2016 Tamil Nadu Legislative Assembly election: Erode (West)
Party	Candidate	Votes	%	±%
AIADMK	Ramalingam K. V.	82,297	43.46%	−15.83%
DMK	S. Muthusamy	77,391	40.87%	
KMDK	Easwara Murthy M	7,477	3.95%	
MDMK	Murugan N	6,624	3.50%	
BJP	Palanisamy N. P.	4,177	2.21%	−0.09%
NOTA	None Of The Above	3,403	1.80%	
PMK	Arumugam P V	3,000	1.58%	
NTK	Jothivel T	2,448	1.29%	
Margin of victory		4,906	2.59%	−22.14%
Turnout		1,89,367	73.91%	−5.36%
Registered electors		2,56,208		
AIADMK hold		Swing	-15.83%	

=== 2011 ===
2011 Tamil Nadu Legislative Assembly election: Erode (West)
Party	Candidate	Votes	%	±%
AIADMK	K. V. Ramalingam	90,789	59.29%	
INC	Yuvaraja M	52,921	34.56%	
BJP	Palanisamy N. P	3,516	2.30%	
Independent	Venkatachalam K	1,371	0.90%	
Independent	Tamilarasu M	1,183	0.77%	
BSP	Nagarajan V. P	1,012	0.66%	
Margin of victory		37,868	24.73%	{{{change}}}
Turnout		1,93,170	79.27%	
Registered electors		1,53,133		
AIADMK win (new seat)				
