= Perundurai taluk =

Perundurai taluk is a taluk of Erode district of the Indian state of Tamil Nadu. The headquarters of the taluk is the town of Perundurai. It falls under Erode Revenue Division.

== Demographics ==
According to the 2011 census, the taluk of Perundurai had a population of 269,600 with 135,850 males and 133,750 females. There were 985 women for every 1000 men. The taluk had a literacy rate of 67.84. Child population in the age group below 6 was 10,358 Males and 9,818 Females.

== See also ==
- Komayanvalasu
- Perundurai block
