= Nasiyanur =

- Panchayat Town
- Location in Tamil Nadu, India
- Coordinates: 11°20′28″N 77°38′36″E
- Country: India
- State: Tamil Nadu
- District: Erode

Area
  - Total: 17.58 km^{2} (6.79 sq mi)

Population (2011)
  - Total: 10,970
  - Density: 624.0/km^{2} (1,616/sq mi)

Languages
  - Official: Tamil
- Time zone: UTC+5:30 (IST)

Nasiyanur is a panchayat town in Erode taluk of Erode district in the Indian state of Tamil Nadu. It is located in the north-western part of the state. Spread across an area of 17.58 km^{2} (6.79 sq mi), it had a population of 10,970 individuals as per the 2011 census. It is mentioned as Nadiyanura in ancient Greek texts.

== Geography and administration ==
Nasiyanur is located in Erode taluk, Erode division of Erode district in the Indian state of Tamil Nadu. It is mentioned as Nadiyanura in ancient Greek texts.

Spread across an area of 17.58 km^{2} (6.79 sq mi), it is one of the 42 panchayat towns in the district. It is located in the north-western part of the state and shares boundary with Erode Municipal Corporation.

Nasiyanur is a first grade town panchayat. It is headed by a chairperson, who is elected by the members, who are chosen through direct elections. The town forms part of the Erode West Assembly constituency that elects its member to the Tamil Nadu legislative assembly and the Erode Lok Sabha constituency that elects its member to the Parliament of India.

== Demographics ==
As per the 2011 census, Nasiyanur had a population of 10,970 individuals across 3,280 households. The population saw a marginal increase compared to the previous census in 2001 when 9,905 inhabitants were registered. The population consisted of 5,445 males and 5,525 females. About 883 individuals were below the age of six years. The entire population is classified as urban. The town has an average literacy rate of 71.6%. About 21.5% of the population belonged to scheduled castes.

About 54.1% of the eligible population were employed with majority involved in agriculture and allied activities. Agriculture along with dairy are the major contributors to the economy. Hinduism was the majority religion which was followed by 97.3% of the population, with Christianity (1.8%) and Islam (0.8%) being minor religions.

== See also ==
- TexValley
- ETMA Turmeric Market Complex
