= Thindal, Erode =

Thindal
- Neighborhood
- Location in Tamil Nadu, India Thindal (India)
- Coordinates: 11.317976°N 77.676473°E
- Country: India
- State: Tamil Nadu
- District: Erode

Languages
  - Official: Tamil
- Time zone: UTC+5:30 (IST)
- PIN: 638012
- Telephone code: 0424
- Vehicle registration: TN-56
- Nearest city: Erode
- Lok Sabha constituency: Erode
- Vidhan Sabha constituency: Erode West
- Climate: Moderate (Köppen)

Thindal is a neighborhood in the city of Erode Tamil Nadu, India. It is located 8 km from Erode Junction and 7 km from Central Bus Terminus, Erode. It is now officially a part of Erode Municipal Corporation. The locality is well known for the Thindal Murugan Temple (Velayudaswami temple). The neighborhood is located along the arterial Perundurai Road which connects the city with western districts like Tiruppur, Coimbatore and Kerala. Outer Ring Road connecting all the arterial roads of the city intersects Perundurai road in Thindal. It is a developing area due to the initiation of various educational institutions.

== Educational Institutions ==
- Vellalar College for Women (government aided-autonomous) since 1970
- Velalar College of Engineering and Technology
- Vellalar College of Education for Women
- VET Institute of Arts and Science
- Vellalar Matriculation Higher Secondary School for Girls Since 1980
- Vellalar High School for Girls
- Vellalar Vidyalaya Senior Secondary School
- Vellalar College of Nursing
- Vellalar Teacher' Training Institute
- Govt. High School, Thindal
- BVB Matric Higher Secondary School, Thindal.
- The BVB, Therkku pallam, Thindal.
- URC Matriculation School
- AET Matriculation School
- The Indian Public School
- Geethanjanli All India Senior Secondary school - CBSE
- CS Academy

== Nearby places ==
Nearby places include Texvalley, Gangapuram (6 km). Vellode Bird Sanctuary (11.5 km), Bhavani Sangameswarar Temple (12.9 km), Villarasampatti (2.8 km), Koorapalayam (5.1 km), Ellapalayam (5.1 km), Kavundachipalayam (5.9 km)
