= Nanjanapuram =

Neighbourhood in Erode

- Village
- Nanjanapuram, Erode (Tamil Nadu)
- Coordinates: 11.314500°N 77.660200°E
- Country: India
- State: Tamil Nadu
- District: Erode
- Elevation: 239 m (784 ft)

Population (2011)
  - Total: 1,897

Languages
  - Official: Tamil
- Time zone: UTC+5:30 (IST)
- PIN: 638 107
- Telephone code: 0424
- Vehicle registration: TN-56
- Nearest city: Erode

Nanjanapuram is a Village Panchayat located in Erode district, in the Indian state of Tamil Nadu. This Village Panchayat is located in the periphery of Erode Municipal Corporation. Nanjanapuram village falls under Erode taluk, located off State Highway 96 (Tamil Nadu).

== Demographics ==
As of 2011 census, Nanjanapuram village had a total population of 1,897 with 960 males and 937 females. Of the total population, 171 are under 6 years of age. Nanjanapuram has a literacy rate of 88.85%, which is lower than the Tamil Nadu average.
