= Villarasampatti =

- Neighbourhood
- Villarasampatti, Erode (Tamil Nadu)
- Coordinates: 11.343600°N 77.685700°E
- Country: India
- State: Tamil Nadu
- District: Erode
- Elevation: 219 m (719 ft)

Languages
  - Official: Tamil
- Time zone: UTC+5:30 (IST)
- PIN: 638107
- Telephone code: +91424xxxxxxx
- Vehicle registration: TN-86 (Erode West)
- Nearest city: Erode

Villarasampatti is a neighbourhood in the city of Erode, Tamil Nadu. It functioned as an independent Village Panchayat until the corporation expansion in 2011. Now officially, it is a part of Erode Municipal Corporation.

== Demographics ==
As of 2011 India census, Villarasampatti village had a population of 7,438. Males constitute a population 3,721 and females 3,717. Villarasampatti has an average literacy rate of 79.24%, lower than the state average of 80.09%: male literacy is 86.47%, and female literacy is 72.06%. Among the total population of Villarasampatti, 9.61% of the population is under 6 years of age.
