= Erode Lok Sabha constituency =

Parliamentary constituency in Tamil Nadu, India

Coordinates: 11.3°N 77.7°E

Erode
- Lok Sabha constituency
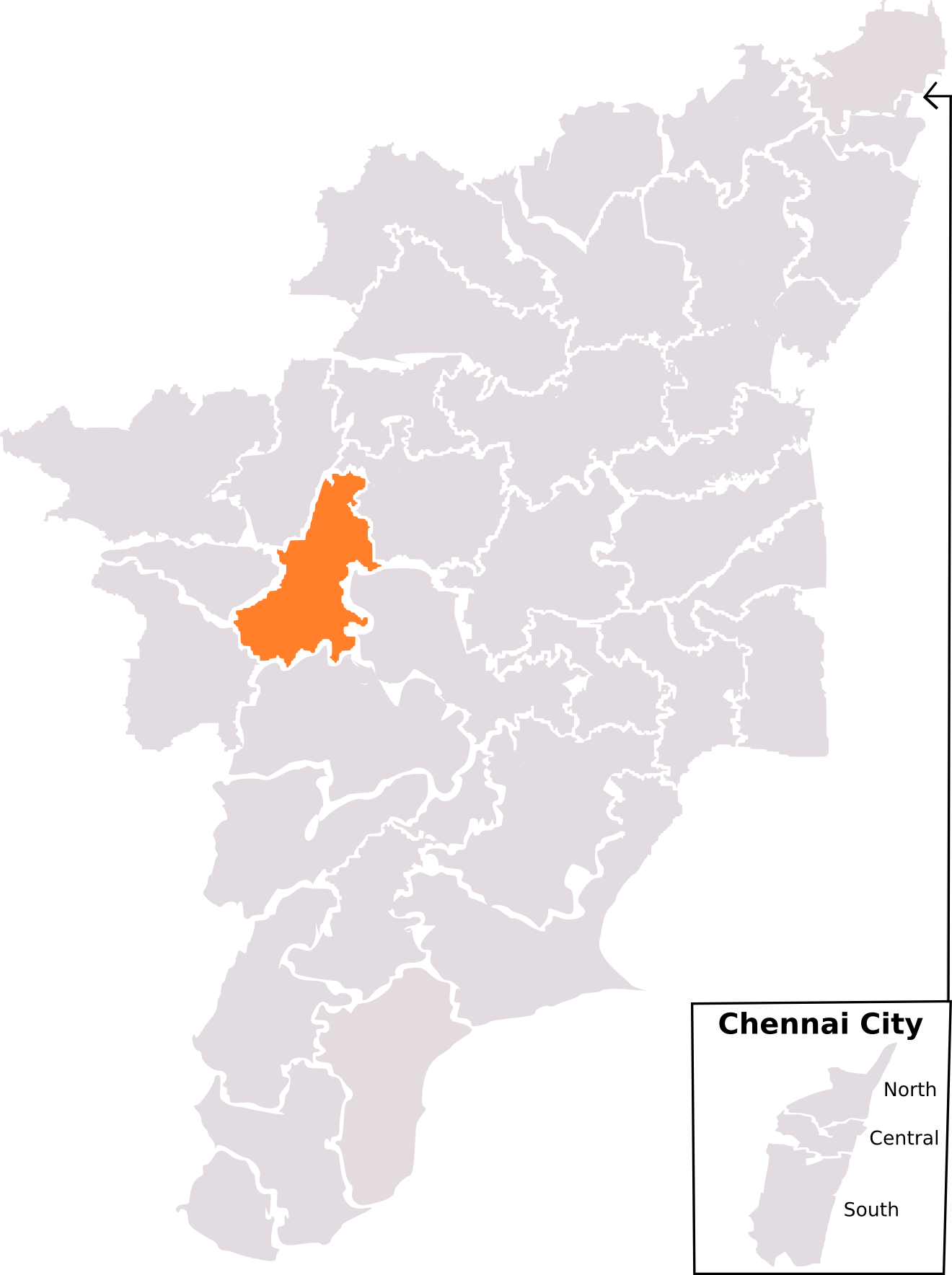
- Area of Erode Lok Sabha Constituency

Constituency details
- Country: India
- Region: South India
- State: Tamil Nadu
- Assembly constituencies: Kumarapalayam; Erode East; Erode West; Modakkurichi; Dharapuram; Kangayam
- Established: 2009
- Total electors: 1,462,246
- Reservation: None

Member of Parliament
- 18th Lok Sabha
- Incumbent K. E. Prakash
- Party: DMK
- Alliance: None
- Elected year: 2024
- Preceded by: A. Ganeshamurthi

Erode Lok Sabha constituency (Tamil: ஈரோடு மக்களவைத் தொகுதி) is one of the 39 Lok Sabha (parliamentary) constituencies in Tamil Nadu, a state in southern India.

== Assembly segments ==
=== 2009–present ===
Erode Lok Sabha constituency comprises the following legislative assembly segments:

Constituency number	Name	Reserved for (SC/ST/None)	District	Party	2024 Lead
97	Kumarapalayam	None	Namakkal	TVK	AIADMK
98	Erode East	None	Erode	TVK	DMK
99	Erode West	None	Erode	TVK	DMK
100	Modakkurichi	None	Erode	TVK	DMK
101	Dharapuram	SC	Tiruppur	TVK	DMK
102	Kangayam	None	Tiruppur	AIADMK	DMK

== Members of Parliament ==
Year	Member	Party
1952 (Note: 2 membered constituency)	Balakrishnan	Indian National Congress
1952	Periasami Gounder	Indian National Congress
Did not exist between 1957 and 1962
1962	Paramasiva Gounder	Indian National Congress
Till 2009 : Constituency did not exist
2009	A. Ganeshamurthi	Marumalarchi Dravida Munnetra Kazhagam
2014	S. Selvakumara Chinnayan	All India Anna Dravida Munnetra Kazhagam
2019^	A. Ganeshamurthi	Dravida Munnetra Kazhagam
2024	K. E. Prakash	Dravida Munnetra Kazhagam

^2024 Incumbent MP A.Ganeshamoorthy was died and By election was planned. But due to general elections, by election was cancelled.

== Election results ==
Vote share of Winning candidates
2024	51.43%
2019	53.07%
2014	47.06%
2009	37.12%
1962	45.75%
1951	21.68%

=== General Elections 2024 ===
2024 Indian general election: Erode
Party	Candidate	Votes	%	±%
DMK	K. E. Prakash	562,339	51.43	▼1.64
AIADMK	A. Ashok Kumar	332,773	29.79	▼3.44
TMC(M)	P. Vijayakumar	77,911	7.13	New
NOTA	None of the above	13,983	1.28	▼0.11
Margin of victory		236,566	21.63	▲1.80
Turnout		1,093,423	71.05	▼2.06
Registered electors		1,538,960		▲4.99
DMK hold		Swing	▼1.64	

=== General Elections 2019 ===
2019 Indian general election: Erode
Party	Candidate	Votes	%	±%
DMK	A. Ganeshamurthi	563,591	53.07	31.17
AIADMK	G. Manimaran	352,973	33.23	−13.83
MNM	A. Saravanakumar	47,719	4.49	
Independent	K. C. Senthilkumar	25,858	2.43	
NOTA	None of the above	14,795	1.39	−0.25
Margin of victory		210,618	19.83	−1.49
Turnout		1,062,073	73.11	−2.46
Registered electors		1,462,246		10.66
DMK gain from AIADMK		Swing	6.00	

=== General Elections 2014 ===
2014 Indian general election: Erode
Party	Candidate	Votes	%	±%
AIADMK	S. Selvakumara Chinnayan	466,995	47.06	
MDMK	A. Ganeshamurthi	255,432	25.74	−11.38
DMK	H. Pavithravalli	217,260	21.89	
INC	P. Gopi	26,726	2.69	−27.98
NOTA	None of the above	16,268	1.64	
Independent	S. Vijayakumar	7,478	0.75	
BSP	Sethupathy	5,917	0.60	
AAP	R. P. Marutharajaa	4,654	0.47	
Margin of victory		211,563	21.32	14.88
Turnout		992,314	76.39	−0.69
Registered electors		1,321,399		30.82
AIADMK gain from MDMK		Swing	9.94	

=== General Elections 2009 ===
2009 Indian general election: Erode
Party	Candidate	Votes	%	±%
MDMK	A. Ganeshamurthi	284,148	37.12	
INC	E. V. K. S. Elangovan	234,812	30.67	
KNMK	C. Balasubramaniam	106,604	13.93	
DMDK	Muthu Venkateshwaran	91,008	11.89	
BJP	N. P. Palanisamy	8,429	1.10	
Independent	S. Sivasankar	6,802	0.89	
Margin of victory		49,336	6.44	
Turnout		765,501	75.98	
Registered electors		1,010,079		
MDMK win (new seat)				

=== General Elections 1962 ===
1962 Indian general election: Erode
Party	Candidate	Votes	%	±%
INC	Paramasiva Gounder	156,739	45.75	
DMK	Narayanan	117,561	34.32	
Socialist Labour Party (India)	S. Balasubramaniam	37,581	10.97	
Independent	K. Muthusami Gounder	16,901	4.93	
Independent	Chinnasamy	13,785	4.02	
Margin of victory		39,178	11.44	
Turnout		342,567	73.72	
Registered electors		478,370		
INC win (new seat)				

=== General Elections 1951 ===
1951–52 Indian general election: Erode
Party	Candidate	Votes	%	±%
INC	Balakrishnan	169,708	21.68	21.68
INC	Periasami Gounder	154,527	19.74	19.74
Independent	Kesavlal Kalidass Sait	137,955	17.63	
SP	Pasupathi	124,622	15.92	
RPI	Kesavalu Pillai	80,721	10.31	
Independent	Rangachari	67,820	8.67	
Independent	Sundaresan	47,333	6.05	
Turnout		782,686	105.33	
Registered electors		743,081		0.00
INC win (new seat)				

== See also ==
- Lok Sabha
- Erode district
- Parliament of India
- List of constituencies of the Lok Sabha
