= A. Ganeshamurthi =

Member of the Parliament of India (1947–2024)

Avinashi Ganeshamurthi

Member of Parliament, Lok Sabha
- In office 23 May 2019 – 28 March 2024
- Preceded by: S. Selvakumara Chinnayan
- Constituency: Erode, Tamil Nadu
- In office 16 May 2009 – 16 May 2014
- Succeeded by: S. Selvakumara Chinnayan
- Constituency: Erode, Tamil Nadu
- In office 19 March 1998 –13 October 1999
- Preceded by: S. K. Kharventhan
- Succeeded by: Palaniyappa Gounder Kumarasamy
- Constituency: Palani, Tamil Nadu

Member of Tamil Nadu Legislative Assembly
- In office 27 January 1989 — 30 January 1991
- Preceded by: S. Balakrishnan
- Succeeded by: Kavinilavu Dharmaraj
- Constituency: Modakkurichi

Personal details
- Born: 10 June 1947 Ulgapuram, Erode, Madras Province, British India
- Died: 28 March 2024 (aged 76) Coimbatore, Tamil Nadu, India
- Party: Marumalarchi Dravida Munnetra Kazhagam
- Other political affiliations: Dravida Munnetra Kazhagam
- Spouse: Balamani

Avinashi Ganeshamurthi (10 June 1947 – 28 March 2024) was an Indian politician from Tamil Nadu who was a member of the Dravida Munnetra Kazhagam (DMK). He last represented Erode in the Lok Sabha. He had earlier been an MP in the 12th and 13th Lok Sabhas.

On 28 March 2024, Ganeshamurthi committed suicide by poisoning himself in Coimbatore, Tamil Nadu. He was 76.

== Positions held ==
Date / Period	Position / Details
28 March 2024	Passed away at Coimbatore on 28 March 2024
May 2019	Re-elected to 17th Lok Sabha (3rd term) (Erode Lok Sabha constituency, Tamil Nadu); Member, Standing Committee on Agriculture, Animal Husbandry and Food Processing (13 Sept 2019 onwards)
2009	Re-elected to 15th Lok Sabha (2nd term) (Erode Lok Sabha constituency, Tamil Nadu); Member, Committee on Science & Technology, Environment and Forests (31 Aug 2009); Member, Consultative Committee, Ministry of Electronics and Information Technology, Ministry of Communications; Member, Consultative Committee, Ministry of Agriculture, Consumer Affairs, Food & Public Distribution
1998; 1998–99; 1999–2000	Elected to 12th Lok Sabha (Erode Lok Sabha constituency, Tamil Nadu); Member, Committee on Communications and its Sub-Committee on Department of Post; Member, Committee on Estimates; Member, Consultative Committee, Ministry of Textiles; Leader, Marumalarchi Dravida Munnetra Kazhagam Parliamentary Party, Lok Sabha
1989–1991	Member, Tamil Nadu Legislative Assembly (Modakkurichi Assembly constituency)
