= List of towns in Tamil Nadu by population =

The following describes the population of towns in Tamil Nadu, India.

== Urban Administration ==
Tamil Nadu, the 11th largest state in India by area. As of 2020, the state has 38 districts, 21 municipal corporations and 138 municipalities. On 14 February 2019, the state government announced in the Assembly that Hosur and Nagercoil will be upgraded to municipal corporations. Avadi became municipal corporation on 19 June 2019.and 24 August 2021 Government of TamilNadu upgrade 6 special grade municipality into city corporation there are Kumbakonam, Karur, Kanchipuram, Tambaram, Cuddalore and Sivakasi

Developmental administration in Tamil Nadu is carried out by Panchayat Unions (called blocks) in rural areas. These panchayat unions have a set of panchayat villages under them. In urban areas, the governance is done by municipal corporations, municipalities or town panchayats based on the size of the town. The Revenue divisions and Taluks of the state. These administrative units are classified based on the district. There are 38 districts in Tamil Nadu and for revenue administration purposes, each district is divided into divisions, which are further divided to Taluks. Each of these Taluks have a list of revenue villages under them. Tahsildar is the head of these Taluks.

== Demographics ==
Among the cities in 2011, the state capital, Chennai, was the most populous city in the state, followed by Coimbatore, Madurai, Tiruchirappalli, Salem and Tiruppur respectively.

- * – Municipal corporations
- * – Municipalities
- * – Chennai Metropolitan Area
- * – Coimbatore metropolitan area
- * – Salem Metropolitan Area
- * – Erode Metropolitan Area
- * – Tirupur Metropolitan Area
- * – Madurai metropolitan area

| Place | District | 2011 census | 2001 census | % increase | 2011 rank | 2001 rank | Sex ratio | Households | 0–6 years % | Literacy | Working |
|---|---|---|---|---|---|---|---|---|---|---|---|
| Chennai | Chennai | 70,88,000 | 43,43,645 | 63.2% | 1 | 1 | 989 | 11,54,982 | 9.88% | 98% | 100% |
| Coimbatore | Coimbatore | 10,50,721 | 9,30,882 | 72% | 2 | 2 | 997 | 2,82,839 | 9.71% | 82.43% | 40.46% |
| Madurai | Madurai | 10,17,865 | 9,28,869 | 68.1% | 3 | 3 | 999 | 2,66,449 | 9.86% | 81.95% | 38.44% |
| Tiruchirappalli | Tiruchirappalli | 9,16,857 | 7,52,066 | 21.9% | 4 | 4 | 1025 | 2,14,529 | 9.41% | 82.78% | 35.69% |
| Tiruppur | Tiruppur | 4,44,543 | 3,44,544 | 29% | 6 | 7 | 955 | 1,24,617 | 10.98% | 78.17% | 46.67% |
| Salem | Salem | 8,26,267 | 6,96,760 | 19.02% | 5 | 5 | 987 | 2,15,747 | 9.53% | 76.37% | 40.05% |
| Erode | Erode | 7,98,129 | 5,89,906 | 27.75% | 7 | 18 | 1008 | 43,184 | 9.29% | 80.08% | 42.1% |
| Vellore | Vellore | 5,04,079 | 3,86,746 | 30.33% | 8 | 8 | 1034 | 1,12,486 | 10.71% | 77.15% | 37.81% |
| Tirunelveli | Tirunelveli | 4,73,637 | 4,11,831 | 15.01% | 9 | 6 | 1027 | 1,20,466 | 9.84% | 81.49% | 38.53% |
| Ambattur | Tiruvallur | 4,66,205 | 3,10,967 | 49.92% | 10 | 9 | 985 | 1,20,248 | 10.39% | 82.61% | 39.55% |
| Avadi | Tiruvallur | 3,45,996 | 2,30,913 | 49.84% | 11 | 10 | 970 | 87,733 | 10.43% | 81.76% | 36.75% |
| Tiruvottiyur | Tiruvallur | 2,49,446 | 2,12,281 | 17.51% | 12 | 13 | 991 | 63,862 | 10.79% | 79.03% | 37.68% |
| Thoothukudi | Thoothukudi | 2,37,830 | 2,16,054 | 10.08% | 13 | 11 | 1010 | 60,714 | 10.49% | 83.85% | 35.18% |
| Nagercoil | Kanyakumari | 2,24,849 | 4 | 8.01% | 14 | 14 | 1045 | 59,997 | 9% | 86.44% | 33.95% |
| Thanjavur | Thanjavur | 2,22,943 | 2,15,314 | 3.54% | 15 | 12 | 1042 | 56,836 | 8.91% | 83.14% | 34.99% |
| Pallavapuram | Kancheepuram | 2,15,417 | 1,44,623 | 48.95% | 16 | 20 | 996 | 56,135 | 10.33% | 83.27% | 37.91% |
| Karur | Karur | 2,14,462 | 1,53,182 | 61.28% | 17 | 17 | 1056 | 57,687 | 9.70% | 79.11% | 43.45% |
| Dindigul | Dindigul | 2,07,327 | 1,96,955 | 5.27% | 18 | 15 | 1012 | 53,573 | 9.46% | 81.69% | 37.53% |
| Tambaram | Kancheepuram | 1,74,787 | 1,37,933 | 26.72% | 19 | 22 | 963 | 44,332 | 10.03% | 82.98% | 39.89% |
| Cuddalore | Cuddalore | 1,73,636 | 1,58,634 | 9.46% | 20 | 16 | 1026 | 42,174 | 10.02% | 78.92% | 35.77% |
| Alandur | Kancheepuram | 1,64,430 | 1,46,154 | 12.5% | 21 | 19 | 997 | 43,411 | 9.78% | 85.23% | 39.35% |
| Kancheepuram | Kancheepuram | 1,64,384 | 1,53,140 | 7.34% | 22 | 17 | 1005 | 41,807 | 9.71% | 79.51% | 37.45% |
| Thiruvannamalai | Thiruvannamalai | 1,45,278 | 1,30,567 | 11.27% | 23 | 23 | 1006 | 33,514 | 10.69% | 78.38% | 34.91% |
| Kumbakonam | Thanjavur | 1,40,156 | 1,39,954 | 0.14% | 24 | 21 | 1021 | 35,509 | 9.13% | 83.21% | 35.14% |
| Rajapalayam | Virudhunagar | 1,30,442 | 1,22,307 | 6.65% | 25 | 24 | 1014 | 37,797 | 8.9% | 77.87% | 41.33% |
| Kurichi | Coimbatore | 1,23,667 | 77,853 | 58.85% | 26 | 43 | 1001 | 32,830 | 10.5% | 80.48% | 39.65% |
| Madhavaram | Tiruvallur | 1,19,105 | 76,093 | 56.53% | 27 | 45 | 989 | 29,792 | 10.94% | 80.61% | 36.43% |
| Pudukkottai | Pudukottai | 1,17,630 | 1,09,217 | 7.7% | 28 | 25 | 1003 | 28,838 | 10% | 82.22% | 35.2% |
| Hosur | Krishnagiri | 1,16,821 | 84,394 | 38.42% | 29 | 37 | 968 | 29,255 | 12.25% | 76.69% | 37.63% |
| Ambur | Vellore | 1,14,608 | 99,624 | 15.04% | 30 | 26 | 1033 | 25,009 | 11.55% | 76.08% | 35.47% |
| Karaikudi | Sivagangai | 1,06,714 | 86,596 | 23.23% | 31 | 34 | 1000 | 27,504 | 9.95% | 81.48% | 37.55% |
| Nagapattinam | Nagapattinam | 1,02,905 | 93,148 | 10.47% | 32 | 30 | 1026 | 24,688 | 11.55% | 78.74% | 32.59% |
| Villupuram | Villupuram | 96,253 | 95,455 | 0.84% | 33 | 27 | 1019 | 22,832 | 10.61% | 80.59% | 34.9% |
| Kuniyamuthur | Coimbatore | 95,924 | 68,901 | 39.22% | 34 | 52 | 1001 | 25,270 | 10.55% | 79.95% | 40.02% |
| Paramakudi | Ramanathapuram | 95,579 | 84,321 | 13.35% | 35 | 38 | 966 | 23,504 | 9.72% | 81.44% | 37.21% |
| Tiruchengode | Namakkal | 95,335 | 80,187 | 18.89% | 36 | 41 | 994 | 26,508 | 9.34% | 75.87% | 44.48% |
| Vaniyambadi | Vellore | 95,061 | 85,752 | 10.86% | 37 | 35 | 1023 | 20,559 | 12.64% | 74.37% | 32.62% |
| Kovilpatti | Tuticorin | 95,057 | 87,450 | 8.7% | 38 | 33 | 1065 | 25,099 | 8.76% | 81.27% | 43.14% |
| Theni Allinagaram | Theni | 94,453 | 85,498 | 10.47% | 40 | 36 | 999 | 25,371 | 9.67% | 77.55% | 39.87% |
| Gudiyatham | Vellore | 91,558 | 91,558 | 0% | 41 | 31 | 1029 | 21,363 | 10.13% | 77.46% | 42.67% |
| Kadayanallur | Tirunelveli | 90,364 | 75,612 | 19.51% | 42 | 46 | 988 | 21,076 | 10.86% | 71.8% | 37.67% |
| Pollachi | Coimbatore | 90,180 | 88,302 | 2.13% | 43 | 32 | 1012 | 24,755 | 8.57% | 82.15% | 41% |
| Avaniapuram | Madurai | 89,635 | 51,587 | 73.76% | 44 | 81 | 979 | 23,051 | 10.67% | 78.75% | 39.97% |
| Udhagamandalam | Nilgiris | 88,430 | 93,987 | −5.91% | 45 | 29 | 1053 | 23,235 | 8.8% | 82.15% | 40.69% |
| Aruppukkottai | Virudhunagar | 87,722 | 84,029 | 4.39% | 46 | 40 | 1014 | 23,803 | 8.73% | 82.12% | 42.9% |
| Velampalayam | Tiruppur | 87,427 | 45,679 | 91.39% | 47 | 93 | 971 | 24,381 | 11.75% | 78.02% | 45.8% |
| Maduravoyal | Tiruvallur | 86,195 | 43,609 | 97.65% | 48 | 97 | 993 | 21,623 | 12.06% | 77.04% | 38.53% |
| Mayiladuthurai | Mayiladuthurai | 85,632 | 84,290 | 1.59% | 49 | 39 | 1045 | 21,929 | 9.02% | 83.55% | 34.86% |
| Veerappanchatram | Erode | 84,453 | 72,703 | 16.16% | 50 | 49 | 992 | 24,216 | 9.84% | 75.33% | 44.35% |
| Goundampalayam | Coimbatore | 83,908 | 48,276 | 73.81% | 51 | 89 | 981 | 22,155 | 10.36% | 80.57% | 42.55% |
| Maraimalainagar | Kancheepuram | 81,872 | 48,463 | 68.94% | 52 | 87 | 953 | 19,970 | 10.77% | 78.67% | 39% |
| Arakkonam | Vellore | 78,395 | 78,686 | −0.37% | 53 | 42 | 1020 | 19,507 | 9.86% | 81.81% | 33.2% |
| Pammal | Kancheepuram | 75,870 | 49,999 | 51.74% | 54 | 83 | 998 | 18,812 | 10.89% | 81.13% | 38.34% |
| Bodinayakanur | Theni | 75,675 | 73,410 | 3.09% | 53 | 47 | 1018 | 20,333 | 8.65% | 76.18% | 39.95% |
| Srivilliputhur | Virudhunagar | 75,396 | 73,183 | 3.02% | 54 | 48 | 1015 | 21,411 | 9.13% | 77.84% | 43.18% |
| Virudhachalam | Cuddalore | 73,585 | 60,164 | 22.31% | 55 | 68 | 985 | 18,209 | 10.51% | 77.57% | 35.54% |
| Kasipalayam | Erode | 73,425 | 52,369 | 40.21% | 56 | 79 | 986 | 20,822 | 9.3% | 78.73% | 43.16% |
| Pattukkottai | Thanjavur | 73,135 | 65,533 | 11.6% | 57 | 57 | 1010 | 18,437 | 9.6% | 80.68% | 35.42% |
| Tindivanam | Villupuram | 72,796 | 67,737 | 7.47% | 58 | 53 | 1003 | 17,088 | 10.53% | 78.19% | 33.54% |
| Virudhunagar | Virudhunagar | 72,296 | 72,081 | 0.3% | 59 | 51 | 1014 | 19,841 | 8.93% | 84.28% | 38.08% |
| Komarapalayam | Namakkal | 71,594 | 65,868 | 8.69% | 60 | 56 | 994 | 20,439 | 8.51% | 72.14% | 51.83% |
| Krishnagiri | Krishnagiri | 71,323 | 64,587 | 10.43% | 61 | 59 | 1015 | 16,386 | 10.86% | 76.79% | 34.43% |
| Sivakasi | Virudhunagar | 2,60,047 | 71,040 | 368.64% | 12 | 50 | 1009 | 18,952 | 9.8% | 79.62% | 41.3% |
| Valparai | Coimbatore | 70,859 | 95,107 | −25.5% | 64 | 28 | 1013 | 19,017 | 7.07% | 78.47% | 54.25% |
| Tenkasi | Tirunelveli | 70,545 | 63,432 | 11.21% | 65 | 61 | 1020 | 17,887 | 10.51% | 78.49% | 39.53% |
| Palani | Dindigul | 70,467 | 67,231 | 4.81% | 66 | 54 | 1023 | 19,015 | 9.18% | 78.95% | 38.53% |
| Nallur | Tiruppur | 70,115 | 29,495 | 137.72% | 67 | 141 | 965 | 19,499 | 12.03% | 76.85% | 45.39% |
| Mettupalayam | Coimbatore | 69,213 | 66,595 | 3.93% | 68 | 55 | 1022 | 18,423 | 9.84% | 77.11% | 38.42% |
| Dharmapuri | Dharmapuri | 68,619 | 64,496 | 6.39% | 69 | 60 | 1013 | 17,136 | 9.85% | 77.08% | 39.26% |
| Kambam | Theni | 68,090 | 58,891 | 15.62% | 70 | 71 | 1012 | 18,567 | 9.78% | 76.55% | 39.1% |
| Mannargudi | Thiruvarur | 66,999 | 61,478 | 8.98% | 72 | 64 | 1018 | 17,372 | 9.22% | 82.92% | 33.79% |
| Puliyankudi | Tirunelveli | 66,034 | 60,080 | 9.91% | 73 | 69 | 1011 | 17,209 | 10.05% | 69.58% | 45.33% |
| Tiruppattur | Vellore | 64,125 | 60,803 | 5.46% | 74 | 66 | 1010 | 14,084 | 11.31% | 76.22% | 35.7% |
| Anaiyur | Madurai | 63,917 | 38,302 | 66.88% | 75 | 109 | 990 | 16,351 | 9.65% | 82.83% | 38.3% |
| Arani | Thiruvannamalai | 63,671 | 60,815 | 4.7% | 76 | 65 | 1036 | 14,889 | 9.97% | 76.9% | 36.59% |
| Thiruverkadu | Tiruvallur | 62,824 | 32,221 | 94.98% | 77 | 127 | 977 | 15,863 | 11.44% | 74.35% | 40.18% |
| Chengalpattu | Kancheepuram | 62,579 | 62,582 | 0% | 78 | 62 | 1020 | 15,675 | 9.4% | 83.25% | 38.25% |
| Chidambaram | Cuddalore | 62,153 | 57,733 | 7.66% | 79 | 72 | 1032 | 15,166 | 9.44% | 83.24% | 35.71% |
| Attur | Salem | 61,793 | 57,519 | 7.43% | 80 | 73 | 1021 | 16,371 | 9.95% | 74.65% | 41.99% |
| Ramanathapuram | Ramanathapuram | 61,440 | 62,050 | −0.98% | 81 | 63 | 988 | 14,716 | 10.37% | 83.42% | 33.16% |
| Udumalaipettai | Tiruppur | 61,133 | 59,668 | 2.46% | 82 | 70 | 1041 | 17,132 | 8.08% | 83.85% | 40.5% |
| Panruti | Cuddalore | 60,323 | 55,346 | 8.99% | 83 | 75 | 996 | 14,170 | 10.37% | 76.19% | 36.18% |
| Gobichettipalayam | Erode | 59,523 | 60,279 | −1.25% | 84 | 67 | 1062 | 17,064 | 7.84% | 78.52% | 42.38% |
| Tiruvarur | Thiruvarur | 58,301 | 56,341 | 3.48% | 85 | 74 | 1053 | 14,997 | 9.91% | 82% | 32.51% |
| Sankarankoil | Tirunelveli | 57,277 | 53,606 | 6.85% | 86 | 77 | 1012 | 14,536 | 9.88% | 74.9% | 42.01% |
| Poonamallee | Tiruvallur | 57,224 | 42,604 | 34.32% | 87 | 99 | 999 | 14,668 | 11.35% | 78.88% | 39.16% |
| Tiruvallur | Tiruvallur | 56,074 | 45,732 | 22.61% | 88 | 92 | 999 | 14,004 | 10.03% | 79.77% | 36.08% |
| Dharapuram | Tiruppur | 56,007 | 64,984 | −13.81% | 89 | 58 | 1045 | 15,842 | 9.01% | 80.4% | 42.36% |
| Arcot | Vellore | 55,955 | 49,953 | 12.02% | 90 | 84 | 1014 | 13,605 | 10.33% | 79.32% | 36.49% |
| Thiruthangal | Virudhunagar | 55,362 | 49,190 | 12.55% | 91 | 85 | 1000 | 15,424 | 10.69% | 71.89% | 49.06% |
| Periyasemur | Erode | 55,282 | 32,024 | 72.63% | 92 | 128 | 960 | 15,198 | 10.28% | 74.12% | 43.63% |
| Namakkal | Namakkal | 55,145 | 53,005 | 4.04% | 93 | 78 | 1015 | 15,008 | 9.07% | 82.52% | 39.12% |
| Idappadi | Salem | 54,823 | 48,815 | 12.31% | 94 | 86 | 946 | 14,560 | 9.87% | 64.67% | 50.64% |
| Puzhuthivakkam | Kancheepuram | 53,322 | 29,086 | 83.33% | 96 | 143 | 992 | 13,918 | 9.9% | 85.55% | 37.52% |
| Mettur | Salem | 52,813 | 53,633 | −1.53% | 97 | 76 | 1016 | 14,282 | 8.12% | 76.82% | 36.55% |
| Kallakurichi | Kallakurichi | 52,507 | 51,854 | 1.26% | 98 | 80 | 984 | 12,801 | 10.55% | 77.08% | 36.21% |
| Devakottai | Sivagangai | 51,865 | 40,497 | 28.07% | 99 | 103 | 982 | 13,192 | 10.04% | 80.95% | 36.05% |
| Pernampattu | Vellore | 51,271 | 41,499 | 23.55% | 100 | 102 | 1028 | 10,450 | 13.39% | 68.94% | 32.23% |
| Tirumangalam | Madurai | 51,194 | 43,631 | 17.33% | 101 | 96 | 1013 | 13,564 | 9.67% | 81.91% | 37.53% |
| Ranipet | Vellore | 50,764 | 47,243 | 7.45% | 102 | 90 | 1091 | 11,764 | 10.09% | 81% | 35.94% |
| Rasipuram | Namakkal | 50,244 | 46,330 | 8.45% | 103 | 91 | 1077 | 13,104 | 8.3% | 77.71% | 40.08% |
| Perambalur | Perambalur | 49,648 | 37,631 | 31.93% | 104 | 111 | 1013 | 12,732 | 10.45% | 80.77% | 37.12% |
| Gudalur | Nilgiris | 49,535 | 43,096 | 14.94% | 105 | 98 | 1032 | 12,101 | 10.82% | 79.48% | 37.97% |
| Thirupparankundram | Madurai | 48,810 | 39,048 | 25% | 106 | 105 | 999 | 12,934 | 9.7% | 79.55% | 37.86% |
| Anakaputhur | Kancheepuram | 48,050 | 31,918 | 50.54% | 107 | 130 | 989 | 12,146 | 11.25% | 78.03% | 37.68% |
| Valasaravakkam | Tiruvallur | 47,378 | 30,978 | 52.94% | 108 | 136 | 1004 | 12,278 | 9.91% | 86.39% | 39.02% |
| Vikramasingapuram | Tirunelveli | 47,241 | 48,309 | −2.21% | 109 | 88 | 1058 | 13,558 | 8.89% | 81.28% | 41.94% |
| Nellikuppam | Cuddalore | 46,678 | 44,222 | 5.55% | 110 | 95 | 1028 | 10,763 | 10.87% | 73.83% | 34.15% |
| Coonoor | Nilgiris | 45,494 | 50,196 | −9.37% | 111 | 82 | 1058 | 12,384 | 8.28% | 84.79% | 38.29% |
| Rameswaram | Ramanathapuram | 44,856 | 37,968 | 18.14% | 112 | 110 | 969 | 10,579 | 11.2% | 73.36% | 37.11% |
| Melvisharam | Vellore | 44,786 | 36,757 | 21.84% | 113 | 112 | 977 | 89,906 | 12.3% | 73.23% | 35.17% |
| Thiruthani | Tiruvallur | 44,781 | 38,314 | 16.88% | 114 | 108 | 1003 | 11,122 | 10.4% | 75.32% | 36.74% |
| Nelliyalam | Nilgiris | 44,590 | 41,837 | 6.58% | 115 | 101 | 1035 | 10,729 | 10.58% | 77.99% | 43.33% |
| Periyakulam | Theni | 42,976 | 42,012 | 2.29% | 116 | 100 | 1013 | 11,401 | 9.53% | 79.84% | 34.57% |
| Chinnamanur | Theni | 42,305 | 38,360 | 10.28% | 117 | 107 | 1007 | 11,545 | 9.49% | 75.61% | 39.78% |
| Palladam | Tiruppur | 42,225 | 30,016 | 40.67% | 118 | 139 | 1009 | 12,054 | 11.23% | 74.08% | 43.52% |
| Gudalur | Theni | 41,915 | 35,531 | 17.97% | 119 | 115 | 1006 | 12,001 | 8% | 66.83% | 49.77% |
| Surampatti | Erode | 41,782 | 31,948 | 30.78% | 120 | 129 | 991 | 11,855 | 10.19% | 76.18% | 47.2% |
| Aranthangi | Pudukottai | 40,814 | 34,134 | 19.57% | 121 | 119 | 1030 | 10,130 | 10.63% | 80.96% | 31.9% |
| Kayalpattinam | Tuticorin | 40,588 | 32,664 | 24.26% | 122 | 124 | 1082 | 9,417 | 12.31% | 81.3% | 28.12% |
| Manapparai | Tiruchirappalli | 40,510 | 35,770 | 13.25% | 123 | 113 | 1012 | 9,934 | 10.1% | 78.98% | 36.86% |
| Sivagangai | Sivagangai | 40,403 | 40,129 | 0.68% | 124 | 104 | 990 | 10,814 | 9.6% | 83.86% | 35.01% |
| Vellakoil | Tiruppur | 40,359 | 34,438 | 17.19% | 125 | 118 | 1002 | 12,157 | 8.52% | 74.37% | 54.64% |
| Pallipalayam | Namakkal | 40,140 | 35,635 | 12.64% | 126 | 114 | 987 | 11,210 | 9.24% | 66.47% | 52.8% |
| Melur | Madurai | 40,017 | 33,881 | 18.11% | 127 | 120 | 961 | 9,872 | 11.22% | 79.47% | 35.3% |
| Bhavani | Erode | 39,225 | 38,778 | 1.15% | 128 | 106 | 1005 | 11,147 | 8.97% | 77.12% | 45.03% |
| Thuvakudi | Tiruchirappalli | 38,887 | 35,428 | 9.76% | 129 | 116 | 842 | 9,402 | 8.39% | 81.56% | 35.77% |
| Keelakarai | Ramanathapuram | 38,355 | 30,412 | 26.12% | 130 | 138 | 948 | 7,448 | 11.45% | 82.63% | 31.37% |
| Sathyamangalam | Erode | 37,816 | 33,722 | 12.14% | 131 | 121 | 1006 | 11,148 | 8.94% | 72.02% | 46.15% |
| Cheyyar | Thiruvannamalai | 37,802 | 35,201 | 7.39% | 132 | 117 | 1014 | 9,162 | 9.92% | 76.59% | 38.57% |
| Kathivakkam | Tiruvallur | 36,617 | 32,590 | 12.36% | 133 | 125 | 983 | 9,354 | 11.75% | 74.5% | 36.25% |
| Kodaikanal | Dindigul | 36,501 | 32,969 | 10.71% | 134 | 122 | 1004 | 9,442 | 10.67% | 79.78% | 38.64% |
| Ambasamudram | Tirunelveli | 35,645 | 32,739 | 8.88% | 135 | 123 | 1048 | 9,845 | 9.24% | 78.91% | 45.34% |
| Manali | Tiruvallur | 35,248 | 28,597 | 23.26% | 136 | 145 | 968 | 9,331 | 11.94% | 74.52% | 36.16% |
| Usilampatti | Madurai | 35,219 | 30,601 | 15.09% | 137 | 137 | 998 | 9,101 | 9.73% | 78.39% | 37% |
| Sirkazhi | Mayiladuthurai | 34,927 | 32,228 | 8.37% | 138 | 126 | 1028 | 8,756 | 9.64% | 81.5% | 32.86% |
| Vedaranyam | Nagapattinam | 34,266 | 31,727 | 8% | 139 | 131 | 1068 | 8,665 | 9.52% | 77.86% | 37.05% |
| Jayankondam | Ariyalur | 33,945 | 31,268 | 8.56% | 140 | 134 | 1031 | 8,664 | 10.37% | 72% | 36.41% |
| Thuraiyur | Tiruchirappalli | 32,439 | 31,005 | 4.63% | 141 | 135 | 1032 | 8,674 | 9.05% | 78.96% | 36.79% |
| Walajapettai | Vellore | 32,397 | 29,475 | 9.91% | 142 | 142 | 1031 | 7,598 | 10.03% | 77.25% | 37.73% |
| Kangeyam | Tiruppur | 32,147 | 28,258 | 13.76% | 143 | 146 | 987 | 9,449 | 8.74% | 77.7% | 48.9% |
| Vandavasi | Thiruvannamalai | 31,320 | 29,610 | 5.78% | 144 | 140 | 1012 | 7,326 | 10.65% | 77.3% | 33.69% |
| Maduranthakam | Kancheepuram | 30,796 | 29,059 | 5.98% | 145 | 144 | 1019 | 7,699 | 10.34% | 75.4% | 39.4% |
| Oddanchatram | Dindigul | 30,064 | 24,132 | 24.58% | 146 | 151 | 994 | 8,046 | 8.9% | 77.11% | 42.37% |
| Jolarpet | Vellore | 29,662 | 27,167 | 9.18% | 147 | 148 | 1032 | 7,140 | 10.61% | 74.44% | 35.87% |
| Sattur | Virudhunagar | 29,398 | 31,443 | −6.5% | 148 | 133 | 1042 | 8,093 | 9.15% | 78.85% | 44.44% |
| Ariyalur | Ariyalur | 28,902 | 27,822 | 3.88% | 149 | 147 | 1014 | 7,319 | 10.3% | 76.04% | 35.58% |
| Kulithalai | Karur | 27,910 | 26,161 | 6.69% | 150 | 150 | 1016 | 7,374 | 9.04% | 81.22% | 38.85% |
| Sengottai | Tirunelveli | 26,823 | 26,838 | −0.06% | 151 | 149 | 1035 | 7,146 | 9.85% | 78.09% | 40.03% |
| Tiruppathur | Sivaganga | 25,980 | 23,559 | 10.27% | 152 | 152 | 1033 | 6,431 | 10.1% | 80.1% | 36.1% |
| Harur | Dharmapuri | 25,469 | 22,995 | 10.56% | 153 | 153 | 1090 | 6,025 | 10.85% | 78.65% | 32.49% |
| Thiruthuraipoondi | Thiruvarur | 24,404 | 22,905 | 6.54% | 154 | 154 | 1036 | 6,263 | 9.52% | 80.19% | 38.43% |
| Colachel | Kanyakumari | 23,227 | 23,787 | −2.35% | 155 | 152 | 974 | 5,205 | 11.46% | 80.52% | 34.02% |
| Narasingapuram | Salem | 23,084 | 18,677 | 23.6% | 156 | 157 | 1003 | 6,230 | 9.66% | 74.58% | 41.53% |
| Padmanabhapuram | Kanyakumari | 21,342 | 20,075 | 6.31% | 157 | 156 | 1029 | 5,549 | 9.93% | 83.92% | 32.97% |
| Kuzhithurai | Kanyakumari | 21,307 | 20,503 | 3.92% | 158 | 155 | 1022 | 5,519 | 8.58% | 85.99% | 36.89% |
| Punjaipuliampatti | Erode | 18,967 | 14,832 | 27.88% | 159 | 158 | 1003 | 5,480 | 8.82% | 74.4% | 45.49% |

== See also ==
- List of cities in Tamil Nadu by population
