= Nanjai Uthukuli Canal =

Canal in Tamil Nadu, India

Coordinates: 11.318535°N 77.726290°E

Nanjai Uthukuli Canal is an irrigation canal that runs in the southern part of Erode city in Tamil Nadu, India. This canal gets its source of water from Perumpallam Anicut, near Surampatti.

This canal irrigates around 2,500 acres (1,000 ha) of farm land by its 15 km (9.3 mi) journey through the areas of Kasipalayam, Sastri Nagar, Moolapalayam, Nochikattuvalasu, Karukkampalayam, Subbarayavalasu, Lakkapuram, 46 Pudur, Muthugoundenpalayam, Chinniyampalayam, and Nanjai Uthukuli. This canal terminates its journey near the wetland in the north of Savadipalayam Pudur.

== Impact of urbanization ==
With the higher level of urbanization in Erode, the canal is severely affected by solid wastes and sewerage from the surrounding residential areas. Accumulation of plastic waste and garbage is the major threat faced by the water channel, causing it to be dry most of the year. Erode Municipal Corporation and other local agencies occasionally take a clean-up routine and clear the water channel from pollution.

== See also ==
- Perumpallam Canal
- Pichaikaranpallam Canal
- Sunnambu Canal
