= Sunnambu Canal =

Canal in India

Coordinates: 11.387524°N 77.695874°E

Sunnambu Canal is a canal that runs in Sunnambu Odai, in the northern part of the city of Erode, India. It was once a natural channel supplying water for irrigation in the surrounding areas. As one of the minor tributaries to the Kaveri River, the canal is fed by rain through smaller rivulets and seepage from the Lower Bhavani Project Canal.

It starts near Chithode and ends as inflow to the Kaveri River near Ramanathapuram Pudur, for a length of 7 kilometres (4.3 mi) through the areas of Sottaiyampalayam and Suriyampalayam.

== Environmental Issues ==
In the late 20th century, many tanneries, textile mills, bleaching and dyeing units were established in the Erode City Municipal Corporation zone. The high industrialisation rate in this zone has adversely affected the canal. At times, the water turns purple due to the mix of untreated dye and other effluents released into waterways. The Government, along with other civic agencies, engaged Norwegian companies to assist with pollution control by implementing biological and mechanical treatment works.

In August 2024, Minister S. Muthusamy warned industries to not discharge effluent in to water canals within Erode city limits, and inaugurated desilting works at Sunnambu Odai. He also organised environmental restoration and protection of water bodies and city canals that enter the Kaveri River.

== See also ==
- Perumpallam Canal
- Pichaikaranpallam Canal
- Nanjai Uthukuli Canal
