= Pichaikaranpallam Canal =

Canal in Tamil Nadu, India

Coordinates: 11.361462°N 77.709439°E

Pichaikaranpallam Canal is a canal that runs in Erode, Tamil Nadu. It is one of the tributary to River Kaveri. The canal gets sourced by the rain water through rivulets and the seepage water from LBP Canal near Nasiyanur, which further flows into Ellapalayam Tank. The canal runs a length of 15 kilometres (9.3 mi) through Ellapalayam, Villarasampatti, Periyasemur, BP Agraharam and passes under the Kalingarayan Canal with the help of an Aqueduct to reach River Kaveri.

== Environmental issues ==
Due to the high industrialization in Erode, a vast number of textile dyeing units and leather processing units came up in the surroundings. Most of these units discharge their untreated effluents into this canal leading to high pollution, causing several health issues to the public. This issue have seen several protests since it heavily damages the underground water potential and agriculture in this area. Along with several social welfare organisations, Erode Municipal Corporation has done a cleaning program to dredge this canal. In 2001, the Tamil Nadu Water Supply and Drainage Board constructed a Sewage treatment plant to treat the contaminated water of this canal before entering River Kaveri. This plant with a capacity to treat 5.7 million litres of water/day, is located near Vairapalayam in the Veerappanchatram Zone. Also, the Erode Municipal Corporation has appointed a consultancy to prepare a Detailed Project Report for the redevelopment of this Canal.

== See also ==
- Perumpallam Canal
