= Transport in Erode =

Transport of a city in Tamil Nadu

Erode city is the headquarters of Erode district, in Tamil Nadu, India. It has an extensive road and rail transport network in all radial directions, as it is landlocked.

== Road Transport ==
=== Roads ===
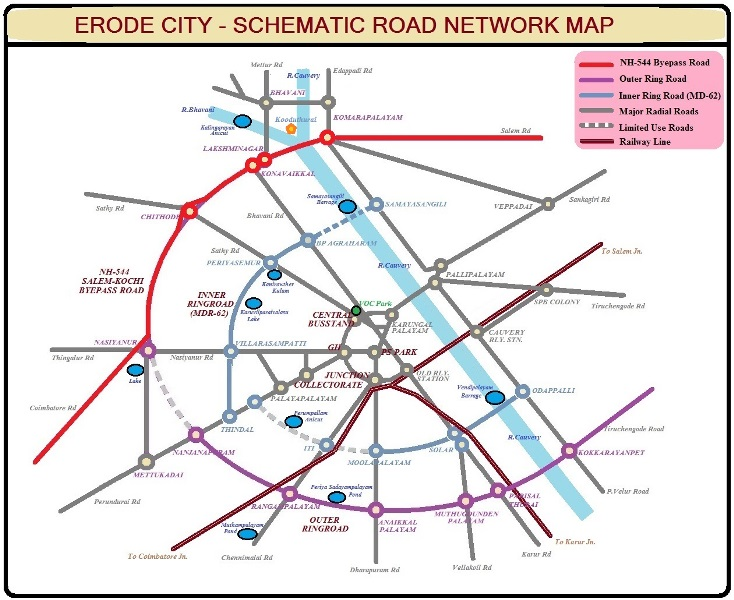
Schematic representation of Road network in the city of Erode

Erode city is well-connected by roads. Erode can be accessed by three National Highways.

- NH 544 (part of North-South Corridor) connecting Salem and Cochin, bypasses the city via Lakshmi Nagar, Chithode, Nasiyanur and Perundurai.
- NH 544H connects Thoppur on NH-44 with Erode through Mettur and Bhavani.
- NH 381A connects Vellakoil on NH-81 with Erode and further to Sankagiri on NH-544.

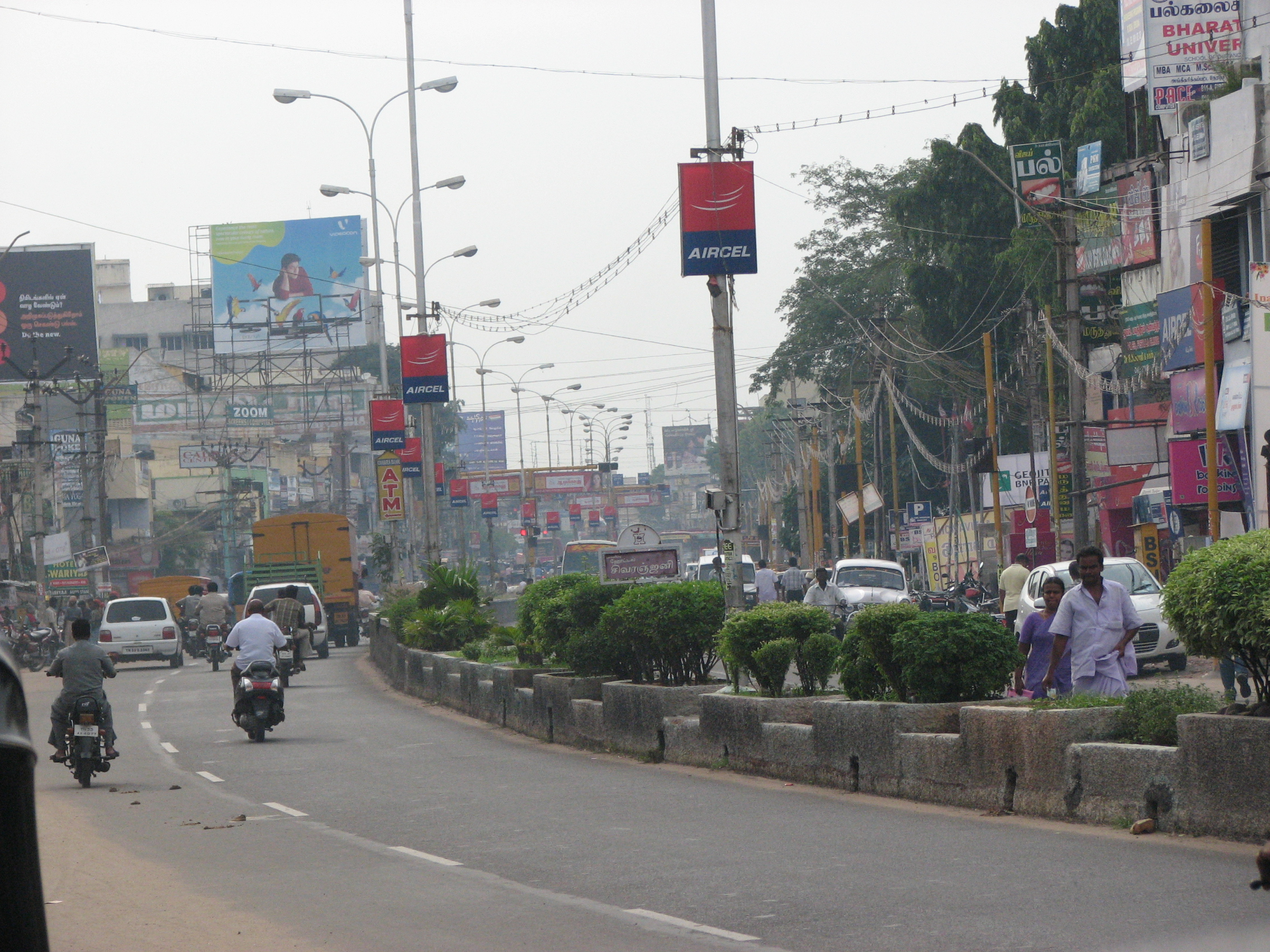
Busiest Arterial Road of the city – Brough Road

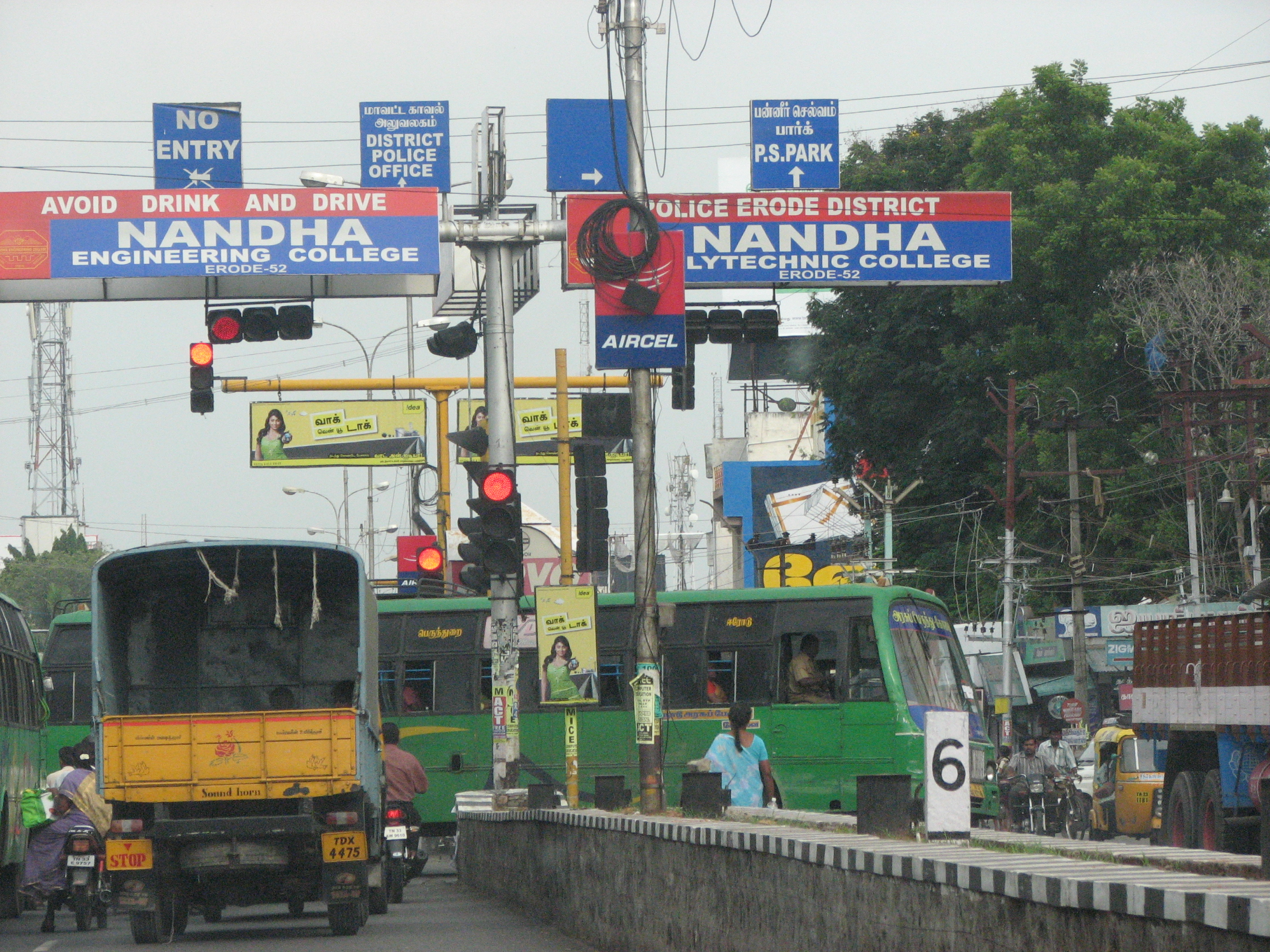
A road in Erode

Other major arterial roads include:

- SH-15 connecting Erode – Gobichettipalayam – Sathy – Mettupalayam – Kotagiri – Ooty
- SH-83A connects Erode with Arachalur, Kangeyam and Dharapuram
- SH-79 connects Erode with Tiruchengode, Rasipuram and Attur
- SH-84 connects Erode with Kodumudi and Karur
- SH-96 connects Erode with Perundurai, Chennimalai and Kangeyam
- Outer Ring Road connects Kokkarayanpettai with Nanjanapuram
- Inner Ring Road (MDR-62) connects Thindal with Villarasampatti, Periyasemur and BP Agraharam

=== TNSTC Erode Region ===
The Erode division of the Tamil Nadu State Transport Corporation(TNSTC), Coimbatore Limited, serves the district's road transport needs with a string of local (City bus) and mofussil (Intercity bus service). The Tamil Nadu State Transport Corporation (TNSTC) has a sub-divisional headquarters at Erode falling under the Coimbatore division. Originally called as Jeeva Transport Corporation (JTC), it started functioning from 1 April 1983 with a fleet strength of 317 buses. The corporation with the principal area of operation in the Erode district, parts of Tirupur, Namakkal, Salem and Karur Districts. The fleet strength as on 31 March 2005 was 1,218. During the year 2003–2005, 114 buses were purchased for replacement. After bifurcation and formation of new region based at Tiruppur, the TNSTC Erode Region has a total of770 buses attached with 13 Bus Depots, as of 2021.

The State Express bus Transport Corporation (SETC) operates express services to various places from Erode.

=== Bus station ===
The Central Bus Station in Erode is the major transport hub of Erode. A large network of interstate and intercity bus services ply from here to various destinations. There are both private and public transport networks available in the city round the clock. It is an integrated bus station serving for City bus service and Minibus services.

Additional Bus stations were proposed in the city at Solar and Periyasemur to reduce the traffic around Central BS (CBD area) of the city. The Solar Bus Terminal is now functional along Karur Road in an area of 24 acres with a facility to park 64 mofussil and 9 city buses. All the buses bound for South Tamil Nadu and delta districts are being operated from this new facility at Solar.

Also there is a plan to construct another Bus terminal near Periyasemur on Sathy road in an area of 14 acres.

== Rail Transport ==
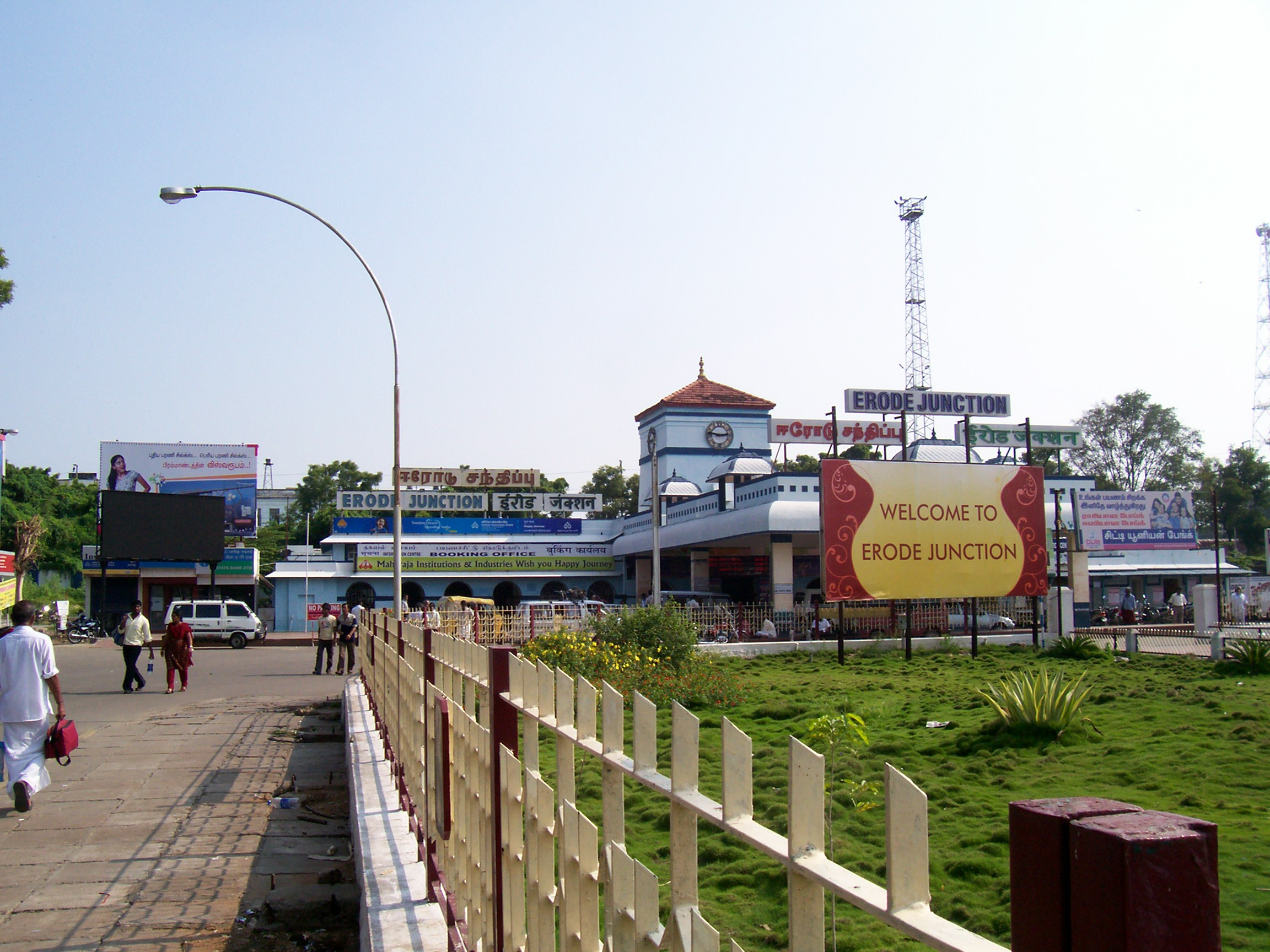
Erode Junction Railway Station

Erode Junction railway station has a road junction nearby viz., Bull-fight Circle. There is a diesel locomotive shed and an electric locomotive shed at Erode Junction and is one of the most important railway stations under Southern Railway with connections all over India. Erode Junction has the distinction of being the third cleanest railway junction in India, after Rani Kamalapati (Bhopal) and Secunderabad Railway Station (Hyderabad) in India. It also serves as the hub for water filling facilities, food provision and toilet cleaning to all long-distance trains that run along the length and breadth of the country via Erode. The station is well connected by buses round the clock. The following are the lines running from Erode junction:

Line No.	Towards	Passing Through Station	Type / Track
1	Salem Junction	Sankari Durg	Broad, Electrified – Double Track
2	Coimbatore Junction	Tiruppur	Broad, Electrified – Double Track
3	Trichy Junction	Karur	Broad, Electrified - Single Track

- Two New lines were proposed in the recent past following the original pre-independence revived proposal of Palani-Erode-Mysore link, which dates back to 1915. One is Erode–Palani line and the other is Erode to Chamarajanagar line via Sathyamangalam.

== Air Transport ==
The nearest airport is Coimbatore International Airport located at a distance of 90 km. which has regular flights from/to various domestic destinations like Ahmedabad, Bengaluru, Bhubaneswar, Chennai, Delhi, Hyderabad, Kolkata, Kozhikode, Mumbai, Pune and international destinations like Sharjah and Singapore.

== Waterways ==
Before 1950s when there were no or limited bridges were available across River Cauvery to connect Erode with Namakkal district the Inland ferry services are available along river Kaveri at places like Lakkapuram, Natadreeswarar Temple, Karungalpalayam, and Nerunjipettai. Now most of them has been stopped except the one at Nerunjipattai connecting Poolampatti in Salem district and only a few services are available at other places supporting local tourism.
