= Kasipalayam =

Kasipalayam or Kasipalam may refer to:

- Kasipalayam (E), one of the four administrative zones of Erode Municipal Corporation in the Indian state of Tamil Nadu
- Kasipalayam-Gobi, a town in the Erode district in the Indian state of Tamil Nadu
- Kasipalayam-Dindigul, a village in the Dindigul district in the Indian state of Tamil Nadu
