= Perumalmalai, Erode =

Perumalmalai, Erode பெருமாள் மலை Mangalagiri
- Neighborhood
- Location in Tamil Nadu, India Perumalmalai, Erode (India)
- Coordinates: 11.406°N 77.680°E
- Country: India
- State: Tamil Nadu
- District: Erode

Languages
  - Official: Thamizh
- Time zone: UTC+5:30 (IST)
- PIN: 638005
- Telephone code: 0424
- Vehicle registration: TN-86
- Nearest city: Erode
- Lok Sabha constituency: Erode
- Vidhan Sabha constituency: Erode West
- Climate: Moderate (Köppen)

Perumalmalai is a hillock and neighborhood in Erode. It is located in the North-Western side of Erode City Municipal Corporation

== Location ==
The hillock located about 10 km from Central Bus Terminus, Erode and 4 km away from Bhavani along National Highway 544H. Located amidst the River Cauvery and Kalingarayan Canal. There is a PUMS school in Perumalmalai.

The hillock is also called as Mangalagiri and the temple atop the temple is a Vishnu temple called as Mangalagiri Perumal Temple. And the Cauvery River Ghat in the foothills is known as Mangalathurai.
