= State Highway 20 (Tamil Nadu) =

Road in Tamil Nadu, India

State Highway 20

Route information
- Maintained by Highways and Minor Ports Department
- Length: 9 km (5.6 mi)

Major junctions
- South end: Erode Central Bus Terminus
- North end: RN Pudur, Erode

Location
- Country: India
- State: Tamil Nadu
- Districts: Erode

Highway system
- Roads in India; Expressways; National; State; Asian; State Highways in Tamil Nadu
← SH 19	→ SH 22

State Highway 20 also called as Bhavani Road is a state highway running across Erode city in the South Indian state of Tamil Nadu. It has a total length of 9 kilometres (5.6 mi). The road is maintained by funds received from the World Bank.

Beyond RN Pudur, the remaining stretch of this road is upgraded as NH 544H to connect Bhavani, Mettur and Thoppur.

== Major junctions ==
- National Highway NH 381A
- State Highway 15 near Erode Central Bus Terminus
- Thindal Link Road (MDR-62) at BP Agraharam, Erode
- National Highway NH 544H at RN Pudur, Erode
