= Pallipalayam =

- Town
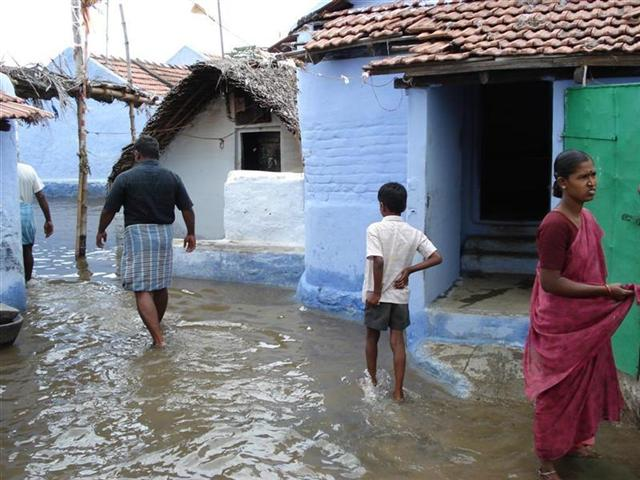
- Houses flooded at Om Kaliamman Koil Street

- Pallipalayam, Tamil Nadu
- Coordinates: 11.367000°N 77.760400°E
- Country: India
- State: Tamil Nadu
- District: Namakkal
- Taluka: Kumarapalayam

Government
  - Type: Second Grade Municipality
  - Body: Pallipalayam Municipality
- Elevation: 200 m (660 ft)

Population (2011)
  - Total: 40,140

Languages
  - Official: Tamil
- Time zone: UTC+5:30 (IST)
- PIN: 638006 / 636008
- Telephone code: 04288
- Vehicle registration: TN-34

Pallipalayam is a municipality in Namakkal district in Komarapalayam taluk in the Indian state of Tamil Nadu. It is the headquarter of the Pallipalayam block.

As of 2011, the town had a population of 40,140. It is Twin city of Erode and shares its Pincode with Erode.

== Geography ==
It is located on one side of River Kaveri, while Erode is on the other side. It is located at 6 km from Erode Junction and 5 km from Erode Bus Station and 60 km from the south of Salem. Pallipalayam Town is located along (Erode-Tiruchengode), (Erode-Kumarapalayam) and (Erode-Sankagiri) State Highways. This town is surrounded in the north by Pallipalayam Agrharam and in the south by Pudupalayam Village Panchayat, Alampalayam Village Panchayat forms the physical boundaries of Pallipalayam in eastern directions and Erode Municipal Corporation forms the boundary along western side.

Pallipalayam gets rainfall during both South West and North East monsoon winds. During this season the Kaveri floods and creates problems for residents living near the river bank.

== Demographics ==
Religious census
Religion	Percent(%)
Hindu	97.07%
Muslim	1.81%
Christian	0.99%
Sikh	0.0%
Buddhist	0.0%
Jain	0.0%
Other	0.1%
No religion	0.01%

According to 2011 census, Pallipalayam had a population of 40,140 with a sex-ratio of 987 females for every 1,000 males, much above the national average of 929. A total of 3,707 were under the age of six, constituting 1,872 males and 1,835 females. Scheduled Castes and Scheduled Tribes accounted for 3.41% and 0.07% of the population respectively. The average literacy of the town was 66.47%, compared to the national average of 72.99%. The town had a total of 11,210 households. There were a total of 21,194 workers, comprising 38 cultivators, 79 main agricultural labourers, 513 in house hold industries, 19,674 other workers, 890 marginal workers, 12 marginal cultivators, 12 marginal agricultural labourers, 32 marginal workers in household industries and 834 other marginal workers. As per the religious census of 2011, Pallipalayam had 97.07% Hindus, 1.81% Muslims, 0.99% Christians, 0.0% Sikhs, 0.0% Buddhists, 0.0% Jains, 0.1% following other religions and 0.01% following no religion or did not indicate any religious preference.

== Economy ==
Textile based activities such as fabric manufacturing and yarn manufacturing is the major economic activity in this town. Fabrics such as yarn dyed fabrics, griege fabrics, printed fabrics, linen fabrics, sheeting fabrics, voile fabrics, poplin fabrics, organic cotton woven fabric and canvas fabric is manufactured in this town using auto-looms and power looms factory. 100% viscose and Polyester viscose yarn are also manufactured in the spinning mills in this area. It is located very closer to Erode, a well known textile centre.

The Chicken Variety named after the town,"Pallipalayam Chicken" is famous all over Tamil Nadu and in other states. This area is famous for manufacturing Dhotis and Lungis.

== Municipal administration ==
Its Legislative Constituency is Komarapalayam and Parliamentary Constituency is Erode.

== Neighborhoods ==
- Tiruchengode (15 km)
- Erode Bus Terminus (5 km)
- Erode junction Train station (6 km)
- Komarapalayam (10 km)
- Sankagiri (19 km)
- Bhavani (12 km)
- Moolapatrai (4 km)
- Moolapalayam (7 km)
- Solar (12 km)
- V. O. C. Park (5 km)
- Panneerselvam Park (6 km)
