= Transport Nagar =

Transport Nagar may refer to:

- Transport Nagar, Madurai, a residential area in Madurai district
- Transport Nagar, Erode, a residential area in Erode district
