= Clock Tower, Erode =

Monument in Erode district, Tamil Nadu, India

Erode Clock Tower
- Interactive map of Erode Clock Tower
- Location: Bazaar, Erode
- Coordinates: 11.341747°N 77.728217°E
- Type: Clock Tower

Erode Clock Tower (known as Manikkoondu in Tamil language) is a clock tower located in Erode, Tamil Nadu, India.

== History ==
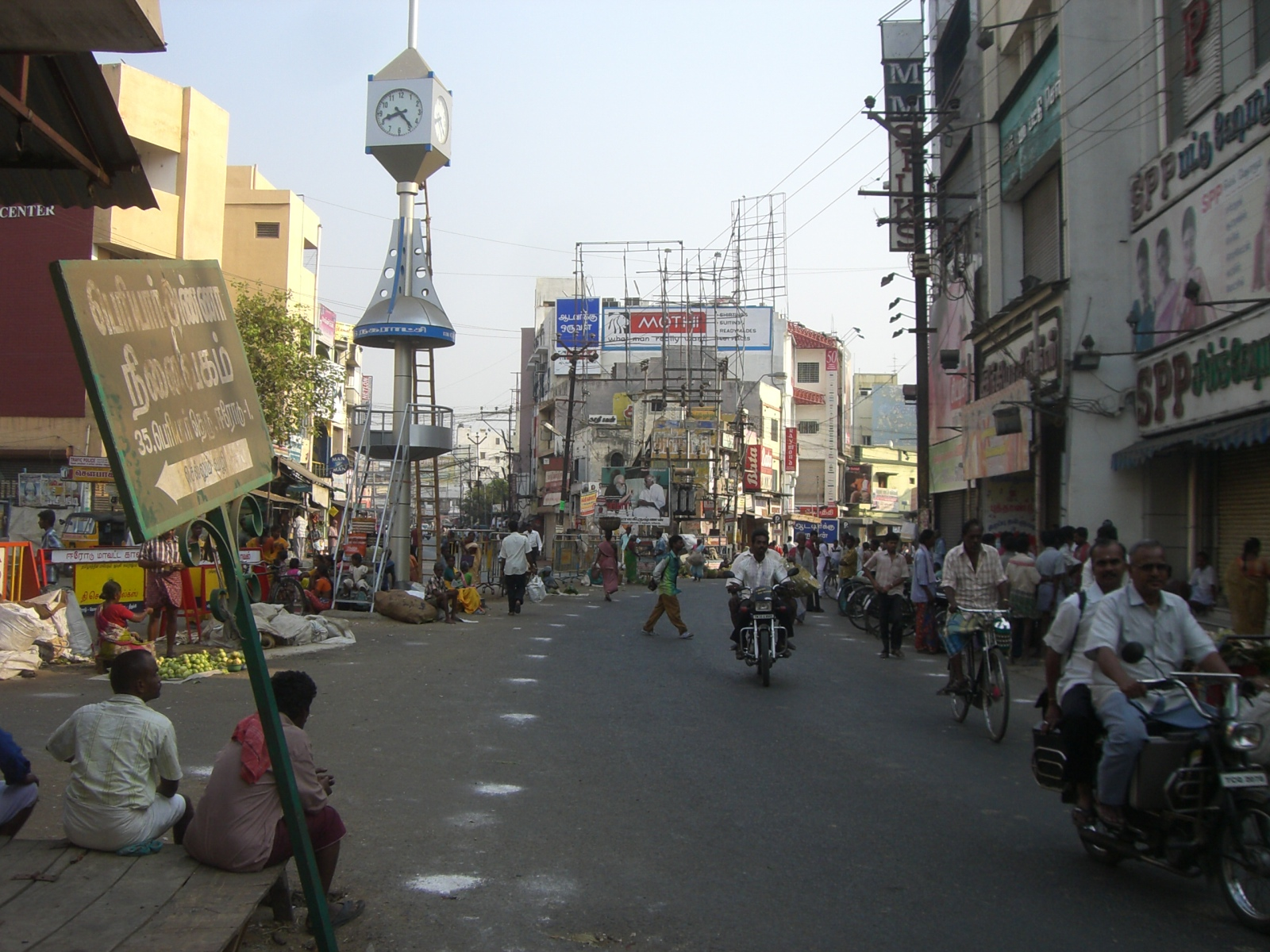
Typical street-life near clock tower in PS Park

The original Clock Tower was built by English in the center of old town near Panneerselvam Park, which is now the Bazaar area of Erode. It was built at a busy junction where five roads emerges out, named Netaji Road, RKV Road, Brough Road, and Easwaran Kovil Road or Fort Road. Logically, it is the zero point of Erode town. South of this clock tower houses Textile Market and North of this clock tower houses Vegetable Market. This clock tower is exactly located at the eastern entrance of Erode Fort. The actual Fort has been demolished and the name alone is retained for this area. In olden days, the eastern areas from this clock tower were called as Pettai.

There was no clock tower structure present in this place for some period of time, the location managed to retain its name and still called by local people as Clock Tower or Manikkoondu in Tamil.

In February 2006, Erode City Municipal Corporation planned to construct a modern clock tower in the same place. A 50-feet tall tower structure was designed and constructed in 2009, along with a Police Watch Tower in the middle.

In 2015, the Erode Clock Tower was removed again, and a new structure was built with public-private contribution.
