= Gangapuram =

Gangapuram may refer to:

- Gangapuram Kishan Reddy (born 1960), Indian politician
- Gangapuram, Erode, a neighbourhood in India
