= Municipal Corporation Building, Erode =

General information
- Location: Erode, India
- Client: Erode Municipal Corporation

The Municipal Corporation Buildings, Erode is the seat of the Erode Municipal Corporation and is situated near Panneer selvam Park, in the middle of Erode city, Tamil Nadu, India. The Municipal Council was established in 1872 and was elevated to Special Grade status in 1980 before becoming a Municipal Corporation on 1 January 2008. It was originally a four storey building, exemplifies vernacular Indian architectural style. Following the 2008 upgrade, a five‑storey extension constructed on the former museum site, which now houses the Council Hall and key administrative offices, including those of the Commissioner, engineers, town planning, and health departments. A 50‑foot granite Memorial Pillar with clock faces on all sides and a four‑lion Ashokan capital was erected at the complex's entrance to commemorate the transition from council to corporation.

== Structure ==
Erode Municipal Council came into existence in 1872 and was elevated to Special Grade during the year 1980 and upgraded as a Municipal Corporation with effect from the very first of the year 2008. Starting from the earlier administration of the City, this building is the place for council that is being elected. It is a four storeyed building near PS Park in normal Indian style architecture. Later after upgradation into Corporation, the Council is expanding the complex with an additional five-storeyed building, in the place of Museum. The work on constructing additional building is nearing completion, apart from the modernisation of the Old building. The New Extension of the building will house the Council Hall, Office of the Commissioners, Engineers and it will house the Town Planning officer and health officers.

== Corporation Memorial Pillar ==
The main attraction of the building was the Corporation Memorial Pillar built in front. This was installed by the same Erode Municipal Corporation in memorandum of the upgradation of Erode Municipal Council into a Corporation. The Pillar is a modern architecture with Granite stones of about 50feet high. There is a Clock mounted on all the four sides of the Pillar, like a clock tower. Also, at the top of the pillar, is the four-lion capital, the model of Asoka's Pillars.
