= Transport Nagar, Erode =

Village in Tamil Nadu, India

Transport Nagar (or Pokkuvarathu Nagar) is a Residential village near the city of Erode. It is located just next to Solar, a major hub for transportation. The locality is developed with the main aim of providing housing for the employees of TNSTC, Erode Region and it comprises about 250 families.

== Location and Connectivity ==
It is located within the limits of Erode Municipal Corporation, on the banks of river Cauvery, at about 10 km from Erode Central Bus Terminus. City Bus Route 15, 15B, 24, 30, and few other connects Transport Nagar with other major places of Erode.

== Surrounding Areas ==
- Solarpudur
- Lakkapuram
- Municipal Nagar
- Ferry Station
