= Perumpallam Canal =

Irrigation canal in Erode, Tamil Nadu, India

Coordinates: 11.334568°N 77.728779°E

Perumpallam Canal is an irrigation canal in the city of Erode in Tamil Nadu. The canal traverses from west to east across the city and flows into River Kaveri. It runs for a length of about 20 kilometres (12 mi).

It gets the water from the sources of rain and seepage of Lower Bhavani Project Canal near Kathirampatti in the western periphery of Erode Municipal Corporation. Running through the areas of Nanjanapuram, Thindal, Sengodampalayam, Surampatti, Stoney Bridge, Marappalam and by flowing under the Kalingarayan Canal, it pours into River Kaveri near Vendipalayam Barrage.

== Anicut ==
A Dam has been constructed over the canal in 1966 named Perumpallam Anicut, near Surampatti. In the downstream of this Anicut, the canal runs for a length of 12 kilometres (7.5 mi) to join river Kaveri. Also, a secondary canal branch off from this Anicut flowing towards Nanjai Uthukuli named as Nanjai Uthukuli Canal.

== Environmental issues ==
With the development of city and rapid increase in population, this canal has been highly threatened by various environmental issues like Pollution, encroachments, sinking of drainage, deposition of solid wastes, etc,. The 5 kilometres (3.1 mi) stretch of this canal between this Anicut and Karaivaikkal is termed as Cooum of Erode due to the contamination of drainage and solid wastes into the canal. In 2003, Tamil Nadu Water Supply and Drainage Board constructed a Sewage Treatment Plant (STP) to treat the contaminated water in this canal before it pours into river Kaveri. The plant with a capacity to treat 20 million litres/day located in the southern periphery of Erode Municipal Corporation near Solar in Lakkapuram panchayat. But this plant is now idle, because of the opposition from public.

A group of social welfare organisations have joined hands and started cleaning up the canal in 2015. Around 570 unauthorised structures has been removed in 2016, to restore the original structure of the canal, which could enable agriculture cultivation in around 2000 acres of farms.
