= Erode Book Festival =

- Status: Active
- Venue: Municipal Ground, VOC Park
- Location: Erode
- Country: India
- Inaugurated: August 2005
- Major events: Marketplace, Awards, Cultural events, Stage Oration

Erode Book Festival is an annual book fair organized in the South Indian city of Erode, Tamil Nadu. It is organised by a social organisation named Makkal Sindhanai Peravai. Erode Book Festival ranks largest in Tamil Nadu.

== Exhibition turned Cultural Festival ==
Along with the stalls displaying books from various publishers, this 12 day program hosts a set of events like Orations from highlighted speakers, honoring of researchers, honoring of publishers and Cultural events by school students.

== Duration and Venue ==
The fair typically lasting for about 12 days, held between the last week of July and the third week of August. The venue of the fair is at the Municipal Ground near VOC Park, Erode. It houses around 230 Stalls which make a turnover of ₹6 Crore at an average. The exhibition will be open between 11 am to 9.30 pm and the entry to this festival is free.

== Celebrities participation ==
As a part of the Cultural Festival, several celebrities were called for stage Oration on various topics. Dr.A.P.J.Abdul Kalam, former president of India made his speech twice in this festival. Other personalities like Sivakumar, Ilaiyaraaja, Pushpavanam Kuppusamy, Suki Sivam, Solomon Pappaiah were few among the frequent visitors.

== G.D. Naidu Award ==
In 2016, the organisation has initiated honoring young researchers in Science, as a part of this Book Festival. The award is named after Gopalswamy Doraiswamy Naidu, an Indian inventor and engineer. The award is to encourage the youngsters to take up research. The award also includes ₹1 lakh cash price.

== Erode Book Festival-2017 ==
The 13th edition of the Erode Book Festival was held between 4 August 2017 and 15 August 2017, for 12 days in the Municipal Ground near VOC Park.

== Note ==
- Varalaragivitta Varugai : Dr.APJ Abdul Kalam's presence at Erode Book Festival
