= RN Pudur, Erode =

Village in India

R N Pudur, also known as Ramanathapuram Pudur, is a residential village located in Erode district in Tamil Nadu, India. It comes under the Suriyampalayam town panchayat, which is now a part of Integrated Erode Municipal Corporation.

R N Pudur is now defined by the industrial developments in the base of Textiles, Dyeing and Leather Processing. As a commercial suburb of Erode, a vast number of Tanneries and Dyeing Units are located around this area. The Armed Force and Police Quarters are located here.

== Connectivity ==
It is located off the Bhavani Road on the banks of River Cauvery. It can be reached from almost all parts of the city with frequent connectivity by local buses. It is about 6 km from both Erode Central Bus Terminus and Bhavani.

== TN-86 ==
- PIN Code : 638 005
- Vehicle Code : TN-86
- Telephone STD : 0424
