= State Highway 19 (Tamil Nadu) =

Road in Tamil Nadu, India

State Highway 19

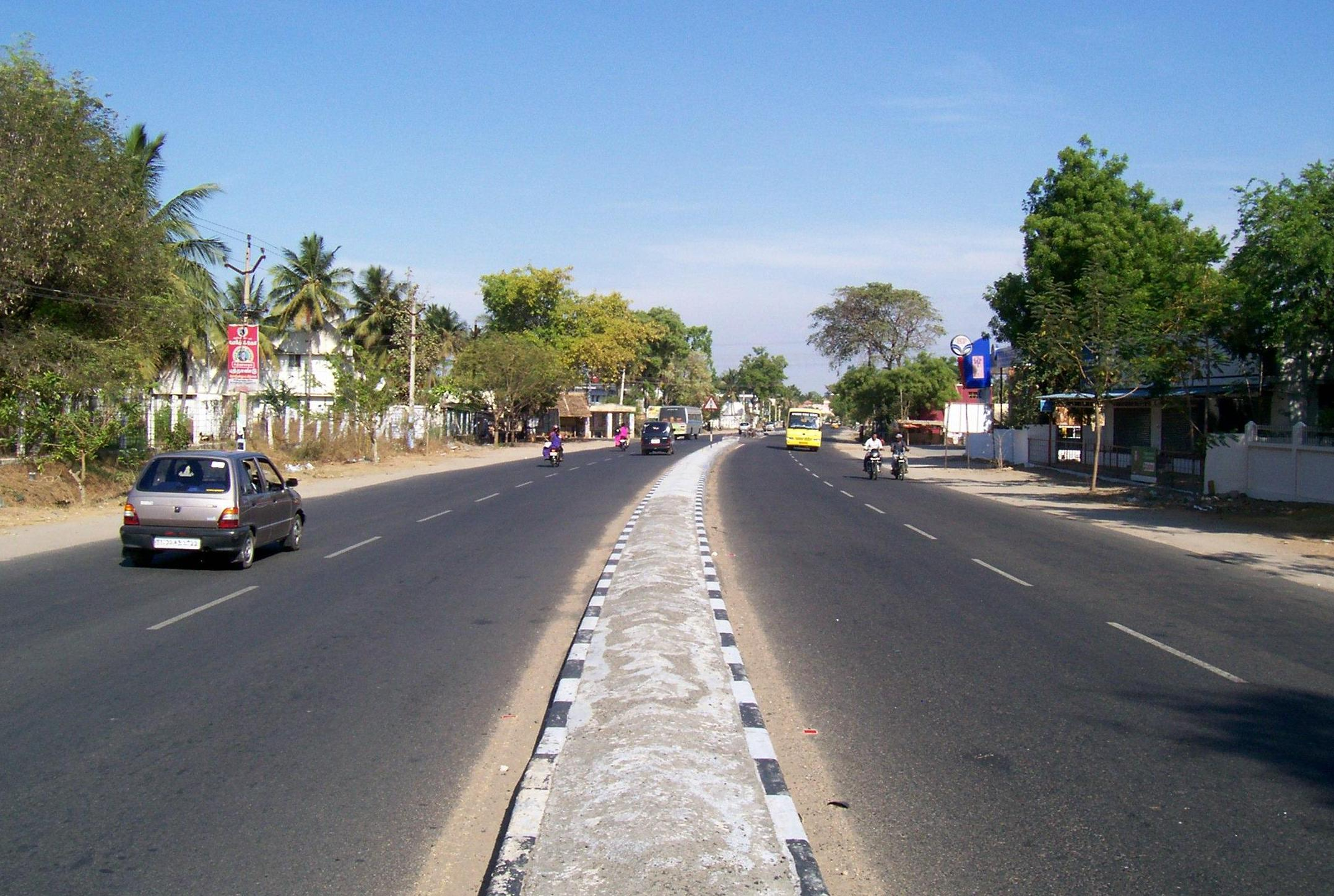
- SH 19 in Avinashi

Route information
- Maintained by Highways Department, Government of Tamil Nadu
- Length: 99.6 km (61.9 mi)

Major junctions
- From: Avinashi, Coimbatore
- National Highway NH-47 in Avinashi, National Highway NH-67 in Palladam, State Highway SH-174 in Tirupur (Tirupur-Dharapuram road), State Highway SH-19 at Avinashi
- To: Cochin Road

Location
- Country: India
- State: Tamil Nadu
- Districts: Tirupur district
- Primary destinations: Avinashi, Tirupur, Palladam, Pollachi, Kochi Road.

Highway system
- Roads in India; Expressways; National; State; Asian; State Highways in Tamil Nadu
← SH 15	→ SH 20

State Highway 19 runs in Tirupur District of Tamil Nadu, India. It connects Avinashi(Coimbatore) with Kochi Road. It will provide an additional connectivity with the Eastern suburban places of Coimbatore like Avinashi, Palladam, Tirupur with Kochi.

== Route ==
Avinashi(Coimbatore), Tirupur, Palladam(Coimbatore), Pollachi(Coimbatore), Kochi Road.

== Major junctions ==
=== National Highways ===
- National Highway NH-47 at Avinashi(Tirupur suburban)
- National Highway NH-67 at Palladam(Coimbatore suburban)

=== State Highways ===
- State Highway 174 (Tamil Nadu)
- State Highway 169 (Tamil Nadu)
