= Central Bus Station, Erode =

Terminal bus station in Erode, India

Central Bus Station, Erode Independance day Silver Jubilee Central Bus Terminus

General information
- Location: Swastik Circle, VCTV Road, Erode; India
- Coordinates: 11.3470°N 77.7197°E
- System: Integrated Bus Terminus
- Owner: Erode City Municipal Corporation
- Operator: Department of Transport (Tamil Nadu)
- Platforms: 11 (100 Bays)

Construction
- Structure type: On ground
- Parking: Yes
- Accessible: Disabled access

Other information
- Station code: ERO (SETC); IRD (KSRTC)

History
- Opened: 1973; 53 years ago

Passengers
- Caters to over 1,20,000 passengers everyday

Services
4,200 services per day; 2,530 mofussil and 1640 city services
Location

Erode Central Bus Stand or Independence day Silver Jubilee Central Bus Terminus is a major terminal bus station located in the City of Erode, Tamil Nadu, India. It is located near Swastik Circle at the junction of Mettur Road and Sathy Road about 3 km north of Erode Junction Railway Station.

It was the first largest bus terminal in Tamil Nadu before the establishment of Madurai Mattuthavani and Chennai Koyambedu bus terminals and even at present it is one of the largest bus terminals in Tamil Nadu.

== History ==
The Central Bus Station was established in 1973 and named Independence day Silver Jubilee Bus Terminus to commemorate the Silver Jubilee celebrations of the Indian Independence. Though it was opened for operations in 1973, the main terminal building facility opened only in 1980. It was followed by the opening of a second terminal building in 1982 and further expanded in the year of 2003 with a separate terminal for town (Intra-city) bus services.

Later in 2011, a dedicated terminal facility has been opened for catering to Intra-city mini-bus services. The bus station is located at the heart of the city, with two entry and two exit points. Erode City Municipal Corporation owns the property and takes care of its maintenance. The entire terminus is spread over an area of 12 acres (49,000 m^{2}) and has enough parking bays to accommodate around 200 buses simultaneously.

== Facilities ==
An air conditioned passenger waiting hall, a reverse osmosis water treatment plant and a separate station for mini-buses are in operation. An underground parking facility has been constructed for two-wheelers and a multi level shopping complex has been developed along with additional public convenience facilities inside the complex.

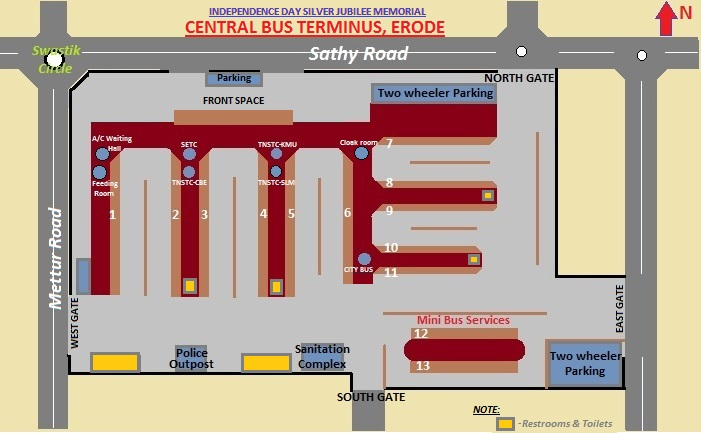
Original layout of the Central Bus Stand in Erode (before 2024).

The bus station is modernized with concrete flooring, high mast lamps and the introduction of various extension counters, e-governance facilities and bank ATMs.

== Operations and traffic ==
This Class-A Bus Station caters to both intra-city and inter-city services originally with 8 bus fingers, 13 platforms and 120 bus bays. The Station is an Integrated facility operating with three terminals namely, Mofussil bus Stand, City bus Stand and Minibus Stand. The original Mofussil Terminal had 75 bus bays for Outstation buses (5 platforms each having 15 bays). The Town bus Terminal has 35 parallel bus bays in 6 platforms for Intra-city buses and the Mini-bus Terminal has 10 bays in single bus finger and two platforms for intra-city minibus services. Buses ply from here to all major towns in Tamil Nadu and other important places in Karnataka, Kerala, Andhra Pradesh and Puducherry.

As of 2014, this terminal handles around 4200 bus services with a share of 2530 Mofussil (Intercity bus services) and 1640 City bus services. Apart from this there are 65 Minibuses operating multiple services from this station and there are around 268 private buses being operated.

Around 40,000 to 50,000 passengers were catered by this terminal every day in 2006. This keeps increasing and as of 2024 data, this bus terminal caters to over 1,20,000 passengers everyday.

Platform	Bus route
1	Buses waiting for schedule / Halt
2	Coimbatore, Tirupur, Ooty, Chennai, Bengaluru, Tirupati, Ernakulam, Puducherry, Palani, Mysuru, Gobichettipalayam
3	Karur, Trichy, Madurai, Thoothukudi, Tirunelveli, Rameshwaram, Thanjavur, Velankanni, Kumbakonam, Mayiladuthurai, Kanyakumari, Oddanchatram
4	Salem, Namakkal, Vilupuram, Rasipuram, Cuddalore, Vellore, Attur, Kallakurichi, Chidambaram
5	Dharmapuri, Bhavani, Anthiyur, Mettur, Ammapettai, Mecheri
6	City bus services towards Perundurai, Chennimalai, Arachalur, Sivagiri, Solar
7, 8	City bus services towards Bhavani, Komarapalayam, Chithode, BP Agraharam, Pallipalayam, Tiruchengode, Sankagiri
9, 10	City bus services
11	City bus services towards Erode Junction, P.S.Park, Surampatti, Thanthai Periyar GH
12, 13	City minibus services

== Renovation ==
The Central Bus Station has been renovated and redeveloped under the Central Government supported Smart City Mission at a cost of Rs.40 Crore, in 2024. During this renovation, the platforms and bus bays were rearranged and reconstructed in the mofussil bus terminal area, making it as linear bus bays with parallel parking in 5 platforms, each with a capacity of parking around 12 buses. The renovation also included a large commercial complex and a huge parking area in the basement.

== Additional satellite bus terminals ==
Owing to the congestion and narrow access roads in the core area of the city, Erode City Municipal Corporation has decided to construct two satellite bus terminals for handling the intercity bus services as a measure to reduce the traffic flow in core city.

One additional bus terminal has been established and open in the South at Solar along Karur Highway near Southern ORR with a capacity to handle 1200 mofussil services bound for Southern and Central districts of the state; while another terminal is soon to be established at Periyasemur (near Kaniravutharkulam lake) along Sathyamangalam Highway near with a capacity to handle 900 mofussil services bound for Western TN districts and Omni bus services. While there are two other small terminals in the city limits at Surampatti and 46-Pudur which are established to cater intra-city local bus services.

The Solar Bus Stand near Solar Transport Nagar Lakkapuram along Karur Road on 24 acres land has been established at a cost of Rupees 75 crore and opened for operations in 2025. While the third major bus stand at Periyasemur (near Kanirowther Kulam) along Sathy Road on 15 acres of land is on progress.

== See also ==
- Transport in Erode
- Solar Bus Terminus, Erode
- Erode Junction railway station
- Outer Ring Road, Erode
