= Pallipalayam block =

Pallipalayam block is a revenue block in the Namakkal district of Tamil Nadu, India. It has a total of 15 panchayat villages.

Pallipalayam town is the headquarter of the block.
