= Texvalley =

Shopping mall in Tamil Nadu, India

Texvalley Shopping Mall
- Location: Erode, Tamil Nadu, India
- Address: NH-544 Salem-Kochi Western Bypass, Gangapuram (P.O), Chithode, Erode, Tamil Nadu-638102
- Opened: August 2014
- Developer: Erode Textile Mall Ltd.
- Num. of stores: 1599
- Floor area: 1,150,000 sq ft (107,000 m^{2})
- Website: texvalleyindia.com

Texvalley is an integrated textile wholesale and retail marketplace located in Erode, Tamil Nadu, India.

== History ==
The mall was proposed by the Ministry of Textiles under the Comprehensive Power-loom Cluster Development Scheme. It was developed by a special purpose vehicle named Erode Textile Mall Limited. The foundation stone for the construction was laid on 22 January 2011 by the then Union Minister Dayanidhi Maran. The weekly market was opened in August 2014.

== Components ==
Texvalley spreading over a vast area encompasses three major components:

- Big Box Bazaar - for B2B and B2C retail and wholesale market.
- Global Market - spread over 1,20,000 sq ft buildup area for B2B and B2C Retail stores.
- Value Mall - Spread over 80,000 sq ft land area for B2C Destination Outlet Mall with branded retails, Food & Beverages, Supermarkets, Fashion & Lifestyle, Multiplex and Food court with dine-in restaurants.

== Facilities ==
The Global market is designed to accommodate about 1599 shops in 1,150,000 sq ft (107,000 m^{2}), and contains about 600 showrooms.

In June 2016, the Powerloom Development and Export Promotion Council (PDEXCIL) shifted its regional office into Texvalley, and also opened a textile design studio inside the campus.

== See also ==
- Abdul Gani Textile Market
- List of shopping malls in India
