= VOC Park Stadium =

Sports complex in Erode, India

V.O.Chidambaram Park SDAT Stadium
- VOC Park Stadium
- Interactive map of V.O.Chidambaram Park SDAT Stadium
- Full name: V.O.Chidambaram District Sports Complex
- Location: Erode, India
- Coordinates: 11.3504°N 77.7206°E
- Owner: Sports Development Authority of Tamil Nadu
- Operator: Sports Development Authority of Tamil Nadu

The V.O.Chidambaram Park Stadium or VOC Park SDAT Stadium, primarily a football venue, is a multipurpose sports complex in the South Indian city of Erode, Tamil Nadu.

It is located inside the SDAT District Sports Complex near VOC Park. The Stadium comes under Sports Development Authority of Tamil Nadu (SDAT), who takes care of its operation and maintenance. It is commonly known as VOC Park Stadium by the people of this Region, due to its presence in the vicinity of the park which is named after V. O. Chidambaram Pillai.

== Infrastructure ==
The sports complex houses the following infrastructure

- Foot Ball Ground (Grass) - 1
- 400m Athletic Track - 1
- Basketball Court - 2 (Concrete floor)
- Volleyball court - 2 (1-flood-lit)
- Kabbadi Court - 1
- Tennikoit - 1
- Kho-Kho Court - 1
- Ball Badminton - 1
- Indoor Court for Shuttle Badminton - 1 (Cement floor with flood-lit)
- Swimming Pool (25mx13m) - 1
- Multi Gym Hall - 1
- SDAT Girls Sports Hostel

It hosts football (soccer), and athletic competitions. There are separate coach for all the games. A 400m synthetic track is under construction.

== National Boxing Competitions ==
The 1st National level Boxing Championship-2010 for Sub-Junior Women held in this stadium between 3.5.2010 and 7.5.2010.

== Independence Day Celebrations ==
Every year, the District level celebrations of Independence Day and Republic Day will be held in this stadium. District Collector will hoist the flag, followed by honoring of Veterans and a set of Cultural events.
