= Muthampalayam =

- Neighbourhood
- Muthampalayam, Erode (Tamil Nadu)
- Coordinates: 11.292510°N 77.685874°E
- Country: India
- State: Tamil Nadu
- District: Erode

Government
  - Body: Erode Municipal Corporation
- Elevation: 232 m (761 ft)

Population (2011)
  - Total: 1,033

Languages
  - Official: Tamil
- Time zone: UTC+5:30 (IST)
- PIN: 638112
- Vehicle registration: TN-56 yy xxxx

Muthampalayam is a neighbourhood locality in Erode city in the Indian state of Tamil Nadu. It was a village panchayat till 2011. Later during the expansion of Erode Municipal Corporation, this officially became a part of it.

== Demographics ==
As of 2011 India census, Muthampalayam village had a population of 1,033. Males constitute a population 890 and females 919. Muthampalayam has an average literacy rate of 70.02%, lower than the state average of 80.09%: male literacy is 79.88%, and female literacy is 60.50%. Among the total population of Muthampalayam, 8.90% of the population is under 6 years of age.
