= Thoppur =

Town in Tamil Nadu, India

Coordinates: 11.939998°N 78.05794°E

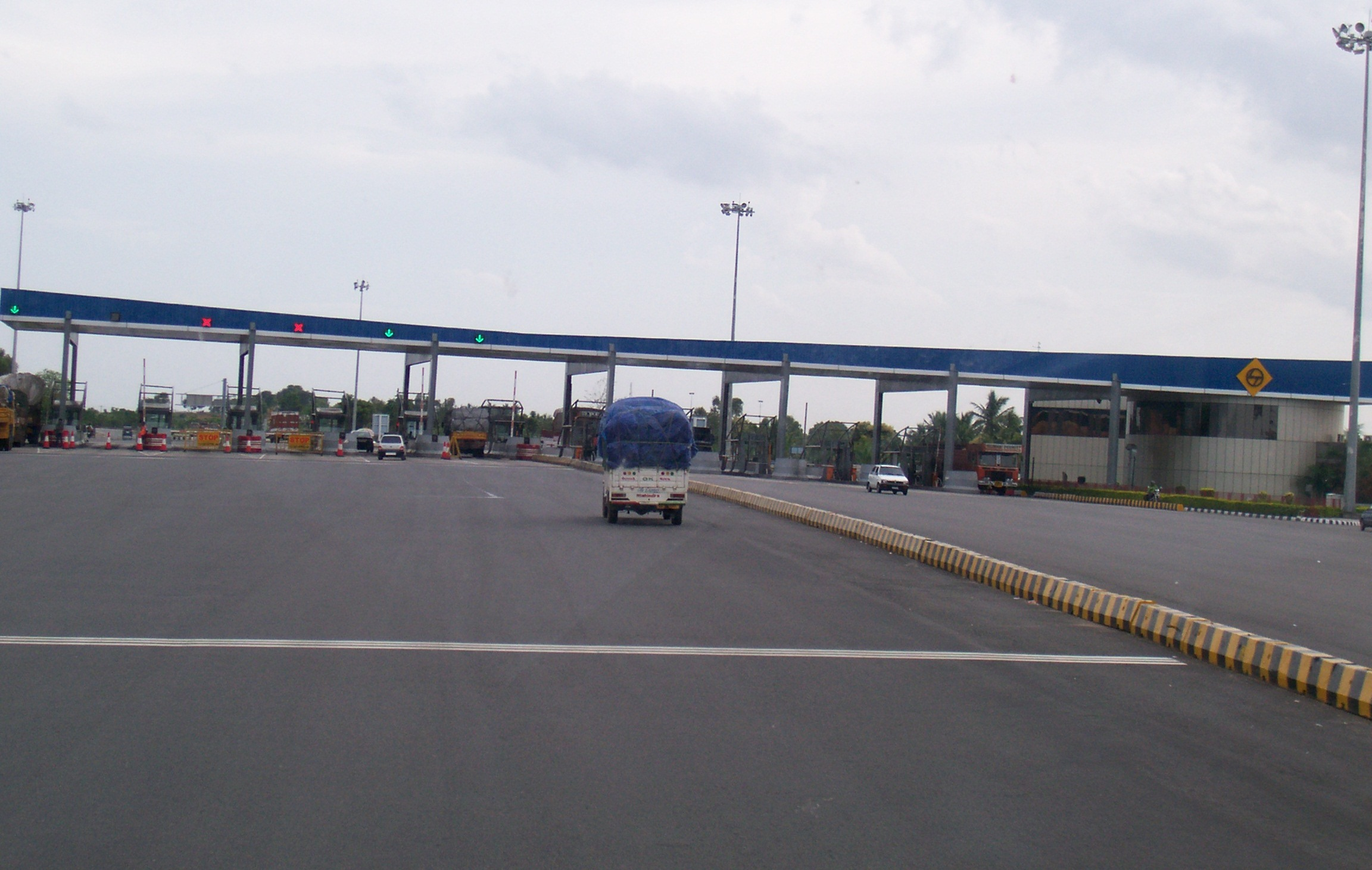
NH 44 L&T Thoppur Toll Plaza

'Thoppur (தொப்பூர்) or Thoppur Ghat is a hill town in Dharmapuri district of Tamil Nadu, India. It lies between the city of Salem and the city of Dharmapuri (தர்மபுரி) on National Highway 44, at its junction with Mettur Dam Road (SH 20). It is 35 kilometres (22 mi) north of the city of Salem and 20 kilometres (12 mi) south of the city of Dharmapuri.

== Transport ==
Thoppur lies on National Highway 44, a major north-south highway in India. It is also the terminal point of State Highway 20 which connects to the town of Mettur and the city of Erode. The NH-44 has the highest rate of fatal accidents of any National Highway in India, with 315 people killed in a three-year period in the early 2020s, which is 3.37 deaths per kilometer per year.
