= Komarapalayam =

Town in Tamil Nadu, India

Komarapalayam Kumarapalayam
- Municipality
- Nickname: KPM
- Komarapalayam, Tamil Nadu
- Coordinates: 11.4363°N 77.7232°E
- Country: India
- State: Tamil Nadu
- District: Namakkal
- Taluk: Kumarapalayam

Government
  - Type: Municipality Grade I
  - Body: Nagar Palika
  - MLA: C.VIJAYALAKSHMI (MLA of TVK)

Area
  - Total: 15 km^{2} (5.8 sq mi)
- Elevation: 220 m (720 ft)

Population (2011)
  - Total: 71,594
  - Density: 4,800/km^{2} (12,000/sq mi)

Languages
  - Official: Tamil
- Time zone: UTC+5:30 (IST)
- PIN: 638183
- Telephone code: 04288
- Vehicle registration: TN-34M

Komarapalayam is a municipality and textile town situated on the banks of the Kaveri and Bhavani rivers, in Namakkal District, Tamil Nadu, India. Komarapalayam is also called Kumarapalayam. Komarapalayam and Bhavani are twin cities separated by the Cauvery river. However, Bhavani belongs to Erode district. Komarapalayam is famous for its textile industries. As of 2011, the town had a population of 71,594.

== History ==
Komarapalayam has a long history as a trading and weaving centre in the Kongu Nadu region. The town grew as a commercial hub due to its strategic location on the Salem–Coimbatore trade route. In 1978, Komarapalayam was upgraded from a Town Panchayat to a Municipality. The town has since developed as an important industrial centre in Namakkal district.

== Geography ==
Komarapalayam is located on NH-544 (Salem–Coimbatore Highway) at an elevation of 220 metres (720 ft). The town is situated near the confluence of the Kaveri and Bhavani rivers. It is approximately 22 km from Erode, 58 km from Salem, and 105 km from Coimbatore.

== Climate ==
Komarapalayam experiences a tropical climate with hot summers and moderate winters. Summer temperatures range from 30 °C to 40 °C (April–June), while winter temperatures range from 20 °C to 30 °C (November–January). The town receives rainfall primarily during the northeast monsoon season (October–December).

== Municipal administration ==
In 1978, Komarapalayam was upgraded from a town panchayat to a municipality. It has a population of 71,594 and an extent of 7.10 km^{2}, as per survey and land records. The town is divided into 33 wards.

The municipal council, composed of 33 ward councillors, is headed by a chairperson who is elected by voters of the town. The councillors elect a vice-chairperson from among themselves. The executive wing is headed by a commissioner, who is assisted by a team of officials including a revenue officer, sanitary officer, manager, municipal engineer, town planning inspector, and other officers.

The annual anticipated income of the town is ₹24 million, and the expenditure is ₹34 million annually.

== Economy ==
Komarapalayam is known for its textile industry, particularly powerloom weaving and handloom production. The town is also a major centre for sago (javvarisi) manufacturing in Tamil Nadu. Several small and medium-scale industries related to textiles, food processing, and trading operate in and around the town.

== Demographics ==
Religious census
Religion	Percent(%)
Hindu	97.12%
Muslim	1.58%
Christian	1.22%
Sikh	0.0%
Buddhist	0.0%
Jain	0.0%
Other	0.07%
No religion	0.0%

According to 2011 census, Komarapalayam had a population of 71,594 with a sex-ratio of 994 females for every 1,000 males, much above the national average of 929. A total of 6,095 were under the age of six, comprising 3,126 males and 2,969 females. Scheduled Castes and Scheduled Tribes accounted for 4.43% and 0.04% of the population respectively.

The average literacy of the town was 72.14%, compared to the national average of 72.99%.

The town had a total of 20,439 households.

There were a total of 37,106 workers, comprising 212 cultivators, 257 main agricultural labourers, 1,767 in house hold industries, 33,774 other workers, 1,096 marginal workers, 19 marginal cultivators, 15 marginal agricultural labourers, 128 marginal workers in household industries and 934 other marginal workers.

As per the religious census of 2011, Komarapalayam had 97.12% Hindus, 1.58% Muslims, 1.22% Christians, 0.0% Sikhs, 0.0% Buddhists, 0.0% Jains, 0.07% following other religions and 0.0% following no religion or did not indicate any religious preference.

== Culture ==
Komarapalayam celebrates major Tamil festivals including Pongal, Deepavali, and Vinayaka Chaturthi. The town has several Hindu temples, mosques, and churches reflecting its diverse religious composition. Tamil is the predominant language spoken in the town.

== Politics ==
=== Constituency ===
Traditionally, Kumarapalayam was part of the nearby Tiruchengode Assembly constituency until 2011. In 2011, it was separated from Tiruchengode to form a new constituency along with Pallipalayam (a nearby town).

=== Lok sabha ===
Komarapalayam falls under the Erode Lok Sabha constituency for general elections.

== Transport ==
Komarapalayam is well connected by road via NH-544 (Salem–Coimbatore Highway). Tamil Nadu State Transport Corporation (TNSTC) operates regular bus services to major cities including Erode, Salem, Coimbatore, Chennai, and Bangalore. The nearest railway station is Erode Junction, approximately 22 km away. The nearest airport is Coimbatore International Airport, about 105 km from the town.

== Media ==
Komarapalayam is served by Tamil-language newspapers including Dinamalar, Dinathanthi, The Hindu (Tamil edition), and DailyThanthi. Local cable television and DTH services are widely used. All India Radio Erode covers the town's broadcast area.
