= Gangapuram, Erode =

Gangapuram
- Neighbourhood
- Gangapuram, Erode (Tamil Nadu)
- Coordinates: 11.360000°N 77.659300°E
- Country: India
- State: Tamil Nadu
- District: Erode

Government
  - Type: Municipal corporation
- Elevation: 223 m (732 ft)

Languages
  - Official: Tamil
- Time zone: UTC+5:30 (IST)
- PIN: 638 102
- Telephone code: 0424
- Vehicle registration: TN-56
- Nearest city: Erode
- Website: https://erode.nic.in

Gangapuram is a neighbourhood in the city of Erode, Tamil Nadu. Located off the National Highway NH 544, it functioned as a village panchayat until 2011 when it was incorporated into Erode Municipal Corporation.

== Economy ==
Agriculture is the major occupation of the people in the village. TexValley, a textile mall of Erode is located here. In recent years, there have been a lot of declining factories, auto looms and warehouses which were established in the village.

== Demographics ==
Gangapuram Village Panchayat had a population of about 4,337 among which Males contribute about 2,230 and Females contributes 2,107.
