= DTH =

DTH may refer to:

== Arts and media ==
- The Daily Tar Heel, an American student newspaper in North Carolina
- Dance Theatre of Harlem, an American ballet school in New York City
- Die Toten Hosen, a German punk rock band

== Education ==
- Doctor of Theology (DTh), a degree
- Technical University of Denmark (formerly Danmarks Tekniske Højskole)

== Science and technology ==
- Dekatherm (Dth), a unit of heat
- Delayed type hypersensitivity, an immune system response
- Direct-to-home television
- Down-the-hole drill

== Other uses ==
- Democratic Society Movement (Turkish: Demokratik Toplum Hareketi)
- Furnace Creek Airport, California, US
