= VOC Park, Erode =

Park in Tamil Nadu, India

V.O.Chidambaranar Park
- Interactive map of V.O.Chidambaranar Park
- Type: Recreational park
- Location: Erode, Tamil Nadu, India
- Coordinates: 11.352°N 77.719°E
- Opened: 1912
- Owner: Erode Municipal Corporation

V.O.Chidambaranar Park or VOC Park is a recreational park located in the South Indian city of Erode in Tamil Nadu. The park is owned and maintained by Erode Municipal Corporation. This park was built during the British India period by chairman Srinivasa Mudaliar. This park was previously known as Srinivasaa Park.

== History ==
The park was constructed in 1912 with a land spread of 25 acres (10 ha), when Thanthai Periyar was the Chairman of Erode Municipal Council. The original idea of the park was developed as a part of the drinking water project for the town. Erode Municipality built a small reservoir named Pechiparai to store water from the river Kaveri and four tanks in the form of towers joined with a wall. A garden was established in its vicinity, named after the then Municipal Chairman Srinivasa Mudaliar. With the succession of Sheikh Dawood as the next Municipal Chairman, he renamed the place to Peoples' Park and added a Mini-Zoo to it. Erode Municipal Corporation plans to spend ₹15 crores to add additional amenities, according to an announcement in 2024.

== Facilities ==
The park has gardens, two lakes, fountains, and walkways. A mini-zoo recognized by the Central Zoo Authority was established in the park in 1992. However, due to improper maintenance, it was closed in 2007. In 2007, the Erode Municipal Corporation developed a Science Park at a cost of ₹13 lakh, opposite the main park. The Science Park, also known as Children's Park, was developed with the aim of improving play-oriented knowledge for kids. A toy train ride was available until 2007 but is not operational now. The Erode Municipal Corporation has opened an Amma Unavagam at the second gate of VOC Park.

== Sports Arenas ==
The Park premises houses two major arenas for hosting sports, fairs and other cultural events.

=== District Sports Complex ===
The District Sports unit is functioning in this Sports Complex. It is commonly called as VOC Park SDAT Stadium. This Stadium is owned and maintained by the Sports Development Authority of Tamil Nadu. The district level Independence Day and Republic Day celebrations will happen here, in the presence of the District Collector.

=== Municipal Grounds ===
There is a maidan owned and maintained by Erode Municipal Corporation named as VOC Park Municipal Grounds, which is primarily used as a Cricket Ground. It also hoists various programs like exhibitions, trade fairs, annual events like Erode Book Festival and other cultural events. A dedicated track has been established for the walkers inside the premises.

== Places of Worship ==
There are two devotional places located inside the premises of the park:

- Mahaveera Anjaneyar Temple
- Darga of 400 years old

== See also ==
- V. O. Chidambaram Pillai
