= Transport Nagar, Madurai =

Place in Madurai, India

Transport Nagar (Pokkuvarathu Nagar) is a small locality in South of Madurai City behind Madurai Airport. Its 3.5 km far from Madurai International Airport New Terminal, Its pincode is 625022. The area has 200 houses, and includes a Temple, Church, Mosque, Playground, Library, Marriage Hall and Nursery School.

== Bus facility ==
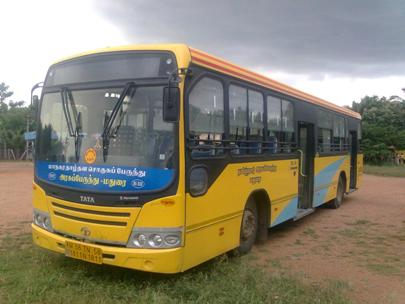

The bus facility at Transport Nagar is well, by the bus service from Madurai central bus stand (Periyar) by the bus no.10L
