= Panneerselvam Park =

Coordinates: 11.352°N 77.719°E

Panneerselvam Park or P.S. Park is a commercial and business locality in the city of Erode in Tamil Nadu, India.

== History ==
In the early 19th century, this locality has celebrated the presence of numerous trees and plantations like a Garden. It was called as Wells Park by the name of Wells the then Municipal Chairman of Erode Municipal Council. In 1940, it has been renamed as Panneerselvam Park by Periyar E. V. Ramasamy in memory of the Justice Party leader Rao Bahadur Sir A. T. Panneerselvam. For the significance of its name, a small park has been created and maintained by Erode Municipal Corporation near the five road junction in the center of this locality. In February 1971, statue of Arignar Anna has been erected in this place and in September 1971, a full-size statue of Thanthai Periyar has been installed in the presence of himself.

In 2017, the park has been demolished to provide space for road expansion and the statue of leaders has been renovated and a dedicated Library building has been opened for serving the candidates appearing for various Competitive Examinations.

With the presence of major Government Offices like Taluk Office, SP Office, Union Office and commercial centers like Abdul Gani Textile Market, this area has become the commercial hub of Erode. The Clock tower is located in the northern portion of this area. A Government Girls Higher Secondary School is functioning in the center of this locality.

== Places of Worship ==
There are two devotional places located in this locality

- Periya Mariamman Temple
- CSI Brough Memorial Church
