= Sunnambu Odai =

Sunnambu Odai (Tamil:சுண்ணாம்பு ஓடை) is in Erode, Tamil Nadu, India. It comes under the Erode City Municipal Corporation.^{2}

== Etymology ==
Sunnambu Odai the origin of the name in Tamil means Lime Canal. This place has a high in limestones, at early stages in 80^{s} to 90^{s} this place has produce lots of limestone bricks for commercial use for construction.

Because of a canal and the Kaveri River nearby, this place is called Sunnambu Odai.
