= Moolapalayam =

- neighborhood
- Interactive map of Moolapalayam
- Coordinates: 11°18′55″N 77°43′36″E
- Country: India
- State: Tamil Nadu
- District: Erode

Languages
  - Official: Tamil
- Time zone: UTC+5:30 (IST)
- PIN: 638 002
- Telephone code: 0424
- Vehicle registration: TN-33
- Nearest city: Erode
- Lok Sabha constituency: Erode
- Vidhan Sabha constituency: Erode East

Moolapalayam is a neighborhood located in the southern side of Erode, Tamil Nadu. It is one of the major residential locality in the city.

Kasipalayam(E) Zonal(IV) office of Erode Municipal Corporation is located in Moolapalayam.

== Location ==
The locality being mostly residential with areas like Shanthi Nagar, NGGO Nagar, LIC Nagar, Bharathi Nagar, Telephone Nagar and Vaigai Nagar; it also houses a number of educational institutions and commercial places like supermarkets and two-wheeler showrooms. Due to the unavailability of space and increasing residential area, the small lands in this locality were turning into Parking places. It is located along the Avalpoondurai Road, about 5 km from Erode Central Bus Terminus and 2 km from Erode Junction railway station. Karur bypass road branches off from Palani road here. The Central Warehousing Corporation has a warehouse in this locality.

== Neighborhoods ==
- Erode Junction railway station
- Erode Bus Terminus
- Solar
- Avalpoondurai
- Mullamparappu
- Kaspapettai
- Bharathi Nagar
