= Ellapalayam =

- Neighbourhood
- Interactive map of Ellapalayam
- Coordinates: 11°21′29.9″N 77°39′55.8″E
- Country: India
- State: Tamil Nadu
- District: Erode

Languages
  - Official: Tamil
- Time zone: UTC+5:30 (IST)
- Telephone code: 044
- Vehicle registration: TN-33 (Erode East)
- Nearest city: Erode

Ellapalayam is a neighbourhood locality in the city of Erode, Tamil Nadu. This was an independent Village Panchayat till the merger with Erode city that happened in 2011. Now officially, it is a part of Erode Municipal Corporation.

== Demographics ==
As of 2011 India census, Ellapalayam village had a population of 2,512. Males constitute a population 1,263 and females 1,249. Ellapalayam has an average literacy rate of 66.84%, lower than the state average of 80.09%: male literacy is 75.3%, and female literacy is 58.16%. Among the total population of Ellapalayam, 9% of the population is under 6 years of age.
