= Kasipalayam-Dindigul =

Kasipalayam-Dindigul Kasipalayam
- village
- Location in Tamil Nadu, India Kasipalayam-Dindigul (India)
- Coordinates: 10°36′54″N 77°57′04″E
- Country: India
- State: Tamil Nadu
- District: Dindigul

Population (2001)
  - Total: 3,472

Languages
  - Official: Tamil
- Time zone: UTC+5:30 (IST)
- PIN: 624711
- Telephone code: 91-(0)4551
- Vehicle registration: TN 57

Kasipalayam is a village in the Dindigul district of the Tamil Nadun state in India. It is also called Kalvarpatti Kasipalayam or Rangamalai Kasipalayam.

The entrance of Kasipalayam was dramatically altered with the construction of the National Highway 7 and elevated flyover.

Most of the inhabitants belong to the Kongu Vellala Gounder community. It is famous for the Mattaparai Karruppanasamy festival which falls on the third day of Pongal next to Mattu Pongal. On this day the entire village becomes a festive arena, much goat cutting (keda vettu) takes place, and relatives are invited to a feast. In the evening, dramas are performed on the open stage in the center of the village.

Farming was once the village's sole occupation, but during the 1980s, some of the inhabitants got into financing thanks to friends from the nearby town of Pallapatti, and these people's offspring migrated away. After Dindigul was declared a drought-stricken district, many villagers left to seek work in the mills.

The nearby Alagapuri Dam attracts tourism, and when the reservoir is full it offers fishing opportunities. Satellite Image of the Dam

== Schools ==
- Govt Elementary School (inside the village)
- Govt Higher Secondary School (Entrance of the village)
- Bedford matric higher secondary school

== Temples ==
- perumal koil
- Kaliamman koil
- Vinayakan koil
- Murugan koil
- mattaparai karuppusamy koil
- rangamalai mallishvarn temple(6 km)

== Industries ==
- Samba Publishing Company
- Rathinasamy Spinners
- balamurugan kozhi pannai
- chandramohan kozhi pannai

== Public utilities ==
- Post Office - (PinCode - 624711)
- Telephone Exchange - (Code - 04551)
- Electricity Board Office
- Co-Operative Bank
- Indian Overseas Bank - (in nearby village Kalvarpatti)
- library

== Convention Center ==
- Palaniappa Gounder Kalyana Mandapam
