= Abdul Gani Textile Market =

Market in Tamil Nadu, India

E.K.M. Abdul Gani Textile Market
- Location: Panneer Selvam Park
- Coordinates: 11.340409°N 77.726945°E
- Address: Erode; Tamil Nadu, India. PIN – 638 001
- Opened: 1983; 43 years ago
- Developer: Erode City Municipal Corporation
- Owner: Erode City Municipal Corporation
- Num. of stores: 1000

Abdul Gani Textile Market locally called as Gani Market, is one of the wholesale and retail textile markets located in the city of Erode in Tamil Nadu, India. It is owned, operated and maintained by Erode City Municipal Corporation.

== Outlets and traders ==
Being one of the biggest textile markets in the state, it houses 1000 individual shops including 300 permanent shops. Both wholesale and retail trading of textile goods happen here. The market opens every day and the weekly market shops opens on Monday-Tuesday. Over-night trading reveals a lot of transactions in this market. The market intakes more than 10,000 footfalls, sometimes even 30,000 footfalls during the festive seasons. This market receives textile merchants from the nearby districts as well as the nearby states like Kerala. Bhavani Jamakkalam is one of the most sold products in this market.

== Modern Textile Hub ==
Presently, the congested market structure is being reconstructed under Smart City Scheme. A modern Textile Hub is coming up in the place of market complex.

Other major wholesale and retail textile markets functioning in the city are:

- Texvalley Integrated Textile Mall on NH 544 Salem-Kochi Western Bypass Road
- Central Textile Market on Gandhiji Road
- Ashokapuram Textile Market on Bhavani Road

Apart from this, there are several street markets functioning inside the city areas like Thiruvengadasamy (TVS) Street, Eswaran Kovil Street, Brough Road and Veterinary hospital Road.

== See also ==
- TexValley
