= Nallur, Tirupur =

Coordinates: 11°05′57″N 77°23′22″E

Nallur
- Municipality
- Interactive map of Nallur
- Country: India
- State: Tamil Nadu
- District: Tirupur

Government
  - Municipality Chairman: Tmt.G.Vijayalakshmi

Population (2011)
  - Total: 70,115

Languages
  - Official: Tamil
- Time zone: UTC+5:30 (IST)
- Vehicle registration: TN-42

Nallur was a third grade municipality in Tiruppur district in the Indian state of Tamil Nadu. As of 2011, the town had a population of 70,115.

== Demographics ==
According to 2011 census, Nallur had a population of 70,115 with a sex-ratio of 965 females for every 1,000 males, much above the national average of 929. A total of 8,436 were under the age of six, constituting 4,408 males and 4,028 females. Scheduled Castes and Scheduled Tribes accounted for 6.52% and .08% of the population respectively. The average literacy of the town was 76.85%, compared to the national average of 72.99%. The town had a total of 19499 households. There were a total of 31,826 workers, comprising 248 cultivators, 346 main agricultural labourers, 522 in house hold industries, 28,422 other workers, 2,288 marginal workers, 16 marginal cultivators, 207 marginal agricultural labourers, 67 marginal workers in household industries and 1,998 other marginal workers.
