= National Highway 544H (India) =

National highway in India

National Highway 544H
- Map of National Highway 544H in red

Route information
- Auxiliary route of NH 44
- Length: 94 km (58 mi)

Major junctions
- North end: Thoppur
- South end: Erode

Location
- Country: India
- States: Tamil Nadu
- Primary destinations: Mettur

Highway system
- Roads in India; Expressways; National; State; Asian
← NH 44	→ NH 544

National Highway 544H, commonly referred to as NH 544H is a national highway of India. It starts from NH 44 near Thoppur, passes through Mettur, Bhavani and terminates at NH 381A in Erode. It intersects NH 544 near Lakshmi Nagar, Erode.

== Route ==
The highway starts from NH 44 near Thoppur and passes through Mecheri, Mettur, Ammapettai, Bhavani and terminates at NH 381A in Erode.

== Junctions ==
NH 44 Terminal near Thoppur.
NH 544 near Lakshmi Nagar, Erode.
NH 381A near Central Bus Terminus, Erode.

== Project development ==
Post declaration of this national highway on 6 June 2017, process of 4 laning of road has been taken up.

Recently in 2022, the stretch from Thoppur to R.N.Pudur in Erode has been sanctioned for upgrading into 2 lane with paved shoulders for a length of 85km under 4 packages and the work is in progress.

== See also ==
- List of national highways in India
- List of national highways in India by state
