= Suki Sivam =

Indian orator, writer and scholar

Dr. Suki Sivam
- சுகி சிவம்
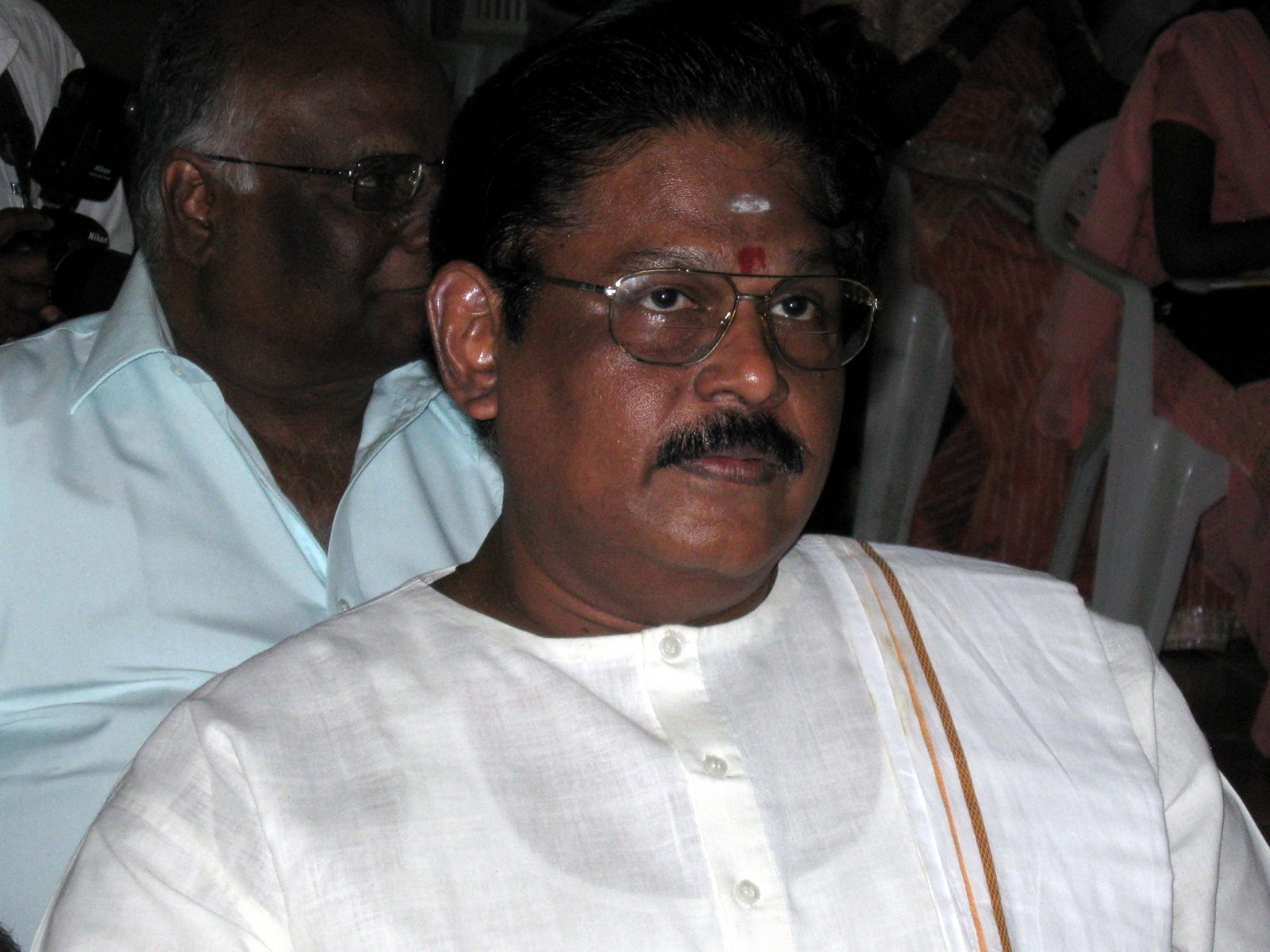
- Born: Subramanian Sadhasivam; August 27, 1954 (age 72); Tiruchirapalli, Madras State (now Tamil Nadu), India
- Occupations: Hindu spiritual orator, Writer, Scholar
- Writing career
- Language: Tamil
- Notable awards: Kalaimamani

Sadhasivam Subramaniam, popularly known as Suki Sivam, is a Hindu spiritual orator, writer and scholar in Tamil language. He hosts a TV show Indha naal iniya naal. He was awarded the Kalaimamani award by the Tamil Nadu government for his contributions towards Tamil literature.

== Early life and education ==
Suki Sivam was born in Trichy as Sadhasivam Subramaniam, on August 27, 1954, as the sixth son of the writer and speaker Suki Subramanian Pillai and Gomathi.

Suki Sivam attended a primary school in Trichy until his third standard. After his family relocated to Mylapore, Chennai, he continued his studies at a primary school there. He later completed his schooling at Santhome School in Chennai. He pursued economics at Vivekananda College in Mylapore, Chennai, and later studied law at Madras Law College.

Sivam was impressed by the speeches of Pulavar Keeran during his youth.

== Awards ==
He was awarded the Kalaimamani award on 2009 by the Tamil Nadu government for his contributions towards Tamil literature.

The Tamil Nadu government conferred the Kambar Award on Suki Sivam for the year 2017.

== Works ==
=== Motivational books ===
1. Happiness forever (எப்போதும் சந்தோஷமே) (Eppodum Santhosame)
2. victory guaranteed (வெற்றி நிச்சயம்) (Vetri Nichayam)
3. Pearls of thought (சிந்தனை முத்துக்கள்) (Sindanai Muthukal)
4. Learn to succeed (படிக்க ஜெயிக்க) (Padika Jeika)
5. They said, they said Part 1 (சொன்னார்கள் சொன்னார்கள்) பகுதி - I) (Sonnargal Sonnargal Volume I)
6. They said, they said Part 2 (சொன்னார்கள் சொன்னார்கள் பகுதி - II) (Sonnargal Sonnargal Volume II)
7. Come, Let us live (வாழ்ந்து பார்க்கலாம் வா) (Vazhndhu Parkalam Vaa)
8. What is the answer to my question (என் கேள்விக்கு என்ன பதில்).(En Kelviku Enna Badhil)
9. SukiSivam Questions & Answers (சுகி சிவம் கேள்வி பதில்கள்) (SukiSivam Kelvi Badhilkal)
10. Success upon success (வெற்றி மீது வெற்றி வந்து) (Vetri Medhu Vetri Vandhu)
11. Better Dreams (கனவு மேம்படும்) (Kanavu Meympadum)
12. Better Family Our goal (நல்ல குடும்பம் நமது லட்சியம்) (Nalla Kudumbam Namadhu Latchiyam)
13. Today, the best day (இந்த நாள் இனிய நாள்) (Indha Nal Eniya Nal)
14. Don't cheat and don't be cheated (ஏமாற்றாதே ஏமாறாதே) (Ematradhey Emaradhey)
15. Food means life (உணவே உயிரே) (Unave Uyire)
16. Long you live, O Women! (பெண்ணே நீ வாழ்க) (Penney Nee Vazhga)
17. Will say good tidings to the world (ஊருக்கு நல்லது சொல்வேன்) (Uruku Nalladhu Solven)
18. Life is an art (வாழ்க்கை ஒரு கலை) (Vazhkai Oru Kalai)
19. Lets live the best (நல்ல வண்ணம் வாழலாம்) (Nalla Vannam Vazhalam)
20. Thoughts & Happenings (நினைப்பதும் நடப்பதும்) (Ninaypadhum Nadapadhum)
21. Avoid Fear (அச்சம் தவிர்) (Aacham Thavir)
22. Mind is the key (மனசே நீ ஒரு மந்திரச்சாவி) (Manasay Nee Oru Mandirasavi)
23. Let us practice to live better (வாழ பழகுவோம் வாருங்கள்) (Vazha Pazhguvom Varungal)

=== Literary and religious books ===
1. ஆனந்தம் பரமானந்தம் (Anandam Paramandam)
2. கிரியா யோகா (Kriya Yoga)
3. மகாபாரதம (Mahabaratham)
4. கம்பராமாயணம் (Kambaramayanam)
5. திருச்செந்தூர் ஸ்தல வரலாறு (Tiruchendur Sthala Varalaru)
6. oru thalam oru paadal oru nayam

=== Motivational videos ===
1. (Your dad's words are truth, no magic is greater than that) தந்தை சொல்மிக்க மந்திரமில்லை (Thandhai Sol Mikka Mandiramillai)
2. (Manage the challenges) சவாலே சமாளி (Savale Samali (VCD)
3. (If you know about you) உன்னை அறிந்தால் (Unnai Arindal (VCD)
4. (Mind is a magic key) மனம் ஒரு மந்திரசாவி (Manam Oru Mandhira Savi (VCD)
5. (Good family, good children) நல்ல குடும்பம் நல்ல பிள்ளை (Nalla Kudumbam Nalla Pillai (VCD)
6. (Laugh and Laugh) சிரிக்க சிரிக்க (Sirika Sirika (VCD)
7. (Are you a better parent ? ) நீங்கள் சிறந்த பெற்றோரா..? (Nengal Sirantha Petrora (DVD)
8. (To improve the relationships) உறவுகள் மேம்பட (Uravugal Mempada (DVD))
9. (Grow everyday) நாளும் உயர்க (Nalum Uyarga)
10. (Today is a good day-Part 1) இந்தநாள் இனியநாள் பகுதி - I (Indha Nal Eniya Nal Part 1 (DVD)
11. (Today is a good day-Part 2) இந்தநாள் இனியநாள் பகுதி - II (Indha Nal Eniya Nal Part 2 (DVD)
12. (Today is a good day-Part 3) இந்தநாள் இனியநாள் பகுதி - III (Indha Nal Eniya Nal Part 3 (DVD)
13. (Live happily) ஆனந்தமாக வாழுங்கள் (Anandamaga Vazhungal)

=== Literary and religious videos ===
1. ஒன்றே பல உருவே (Ornre Pala Uruve)
2. ஞானம் வளர்த்த மாமணிகள் (Gnanam Valartha Mamanigal)
3. திருச்செந்தூர் தல வரலாறு (Thiruchendur Thalavaralaru (VCD)
4. நல்வழி காட்டிய நால்வர் (Nalvazhi Katiya Nalvar)
5. புத்தர் வாழ்வும் வாக்கும் (Buddar Vazhvum Vaakum (DVD))
6. முருக தரிசனம் (Muruga Darisanam (VCD))
7. பகவான் ஸ்ரீ இராமகிருஷ்ணர் (Bhagavan sri Ramakrishnar (DVD)
8. திருவாசகத்தேன் (Thiruvasagathen)
9. வடலூர் வள்ளல் (Vadalur Vallal (DVD)
10. கண்ணப்ப நாயனார் (Kannapa Nayanar)
11. சிறுதொண்டர் / இயர்பாகையார் (Siruthondar / Eyarpagayar)
12. கிருஷ்ணா கிருஷ்ணா (Krishna Krishna)
13. கிரியா பாபாஜி (Kriya Babaji)
14. ஆதிசங்கரர் (Aadisankarar)
15. லலிதா சஹஸ்ரநாமம் (Lalitha Sahasranamam)
16. தாயுமான சுவாமிகள் (Thayumana Swamigal)
17. கவியரசர் கண்ணதாசன் (Kaviyarasar Kannadasan)
18. 18 ஹனுமன் பெருமைகள் (HANUMAN PERUMAIGAL)
