= Pudur, Erode =

Village in India

Pudur 46-Pudur
- village
- Interactive map of Pudur
- Coordinates: 11°17′41″N 77°44′48″E
- Country: India
- State: Tamil Nadu
- District: Erode

Population (2011)
  - Total: 16,054

Languages
  - Official: Tamil
- Time zone: UTC+5:30 (IST)
- Postal code: 628002
- Vehicle registration: TN-33 (Erode East)

Pudur or 46 Pudur is a village in the Modakurichi taluk of Erode district in the south Indian state of Tamil Nadu.

== Demographics ==
As of 2011 census, Pudur (46) village had a total population of 16,054 with 8129 males and 7925 females. Out of the total population 1440 are under 6 years of age. Pudur has a literacy rate of 83.70% which is higher than Tamil Nadu average.

== Developments ==
The population of the village is increasing due its presence along the periphery of Erode city. This panchayat was included as a part of Erode Local Planning Area, since the establishment of Erode Local Planning Authority. The Ring Road laid for Erode passes through this village, where a new Bus stand has been built. In 2016, Erode Municipal Corporation council declared a resolution to merge Pudur (46) with Erode Corporation jurisdiction.
