= Suriyampalayam =

- neighbourhood
- Location in Tamil Nadu, India
- Coordinates: 11°24′19″N 77°40′46″E
- Country: India
- State: Tamil Nadu
- District: Erode

Government
  - Body: Erode Municipal Corporation

Area
  - Total: 18.60 km^{2} (7.18 sq mi)

Population (2011)
  - Total: 28,585
  - Density: 1,537/km^{2} (3,980/sq mi)

Languages
  - Official: Tamil
- Time zone: UTC+5:30 (IST)
- Postal code: 638102
- Vehicle registration: TN-86

Suriyampalayam is a panchayat town in the city of Erode in the Indian state of Tamil Nadu. It is the Headquarters for one of the four zones of Erode Municipal Corporation. In 2011, Suriyampalayam was an independent panchayat town, but has since been merged with Erode during the Corporation expansion that happened in 2011. The office of Suriyampalayam Zone-I and city bank, Bank of Baroda, is located at Javuli Nagar along the Bhavani Road, although there are other local banks in the area. Its higher post office is located in Kavandapadi.

According to one source, some of Suriyampalayam's textile units are major contributors to Erode's difficulty with pollution, due to its position next to the Kaveri River. Leather products, cloths and milk were considered the three most important manufactured commodities in the 2011 Census.

- Suriyampalayam's local government has administration over 8,153 houses and 15 wards.
- Suriyampalayam has approximately 25 schools and colleges: 8 primary schools, 8 middle schools, 4 secondary schools and 3 colleges.
- As of 2009, Suriyamplayam gets an average annual precipitation of 708.6 millimeters and has an average minimum:maximum temperature of 19.2°C:33.7°C.
- Suriyampalayam has 17 kilometres of road infrastructure and 3566 communal latrines.

== Demographics ==
As of the 2011 Indian Census, Suriyampalayam had a population of 28,585, a 2.7% increase from the 2001 Census.

- Males and females both constitute 50% of the population; 48:52 male-female ratio for scheduled castes and tribes.
- Suriyampalayam has an average literacy rate of 76.7%: 84.4% for males and 69.12% for females, higher than the national average of 72.9%.
- Unemployment rate is Suriyampalayam is 46.2%; 2.9% are self-employed and 13% income on jobs based around agriculture.
- 26% of the population is part of Scheduled Castes and Scheduled Tribes.
- 10.54% of the population is under the age of 6.
- 94.9% of the population follows Hinduism.
- 24% of people in Suriyampalayam were described as 'slum dwellers' in the 2011 Census.
