= Nanjai Uthukuli =

Village in India

- village
- Location in Tamil Nadu, India
- Coordinates: 11°15′57″N 77°46′12″E
- Country: India
- State: Tamil Nadu
- District: Erode

Population (2011)
  - Total: 13,234

Languages
  - Official: Tamil
- Time zone: UTC+5:30 (IST)

Nanjai Uthukuli is a large village located in Erode district in the South Indian state of Tamil Nadu.

== Demographics ==
As of 2011 India census, Nanjai Uthukuli village had a population of 13,234. Males constitute a population 6568 and females 6666. Nanjai Uthukuli has an average literacy rate of 72.54%, the lower than the state average of 80.09%: male literacy is 80.79%, and female literacy is 64.5%. Among the total population of Nanjai Uthukuli, 9.35% of the population is under 6 years of age. Nagamanikkam Mudaliar was last Zamindar of Nanjai Uthukuli.

== See also ==
- Natadreeswarar Temple
- Chinna Samundeeswari Amman Temple
- Periya Samundeeswari Amman Temple
- Valala eswarar temple
- Mariyamman Temple
