= Veerappanchatram =

- neighbourhood
- Location in Tamil Nadu, India Veerappanchatram (India)
- Coordinates: 11.3552778°N 77.6677778°E
- Country: India
- State: Tamil Nadu
- District: Erode

Population (2011)
  - Total: 84,453

Languages
  - Official: Tamil
- Time zone: UTC+5:30 (IST)

Veerappanchatram is a neighbourhood locality in the city of Erode. Until 2010, it was an independent municipal administrative body after which it was officially integrated with Erode Municipal Corporation. It is one of the four zones of Erode Municipal Corporation, combining 15 Wards. As of 2011, the town had a population of 84,453.

== Demographics ==
Religious census
Religion	Percent(%)
Hindu	92.31%
Muslim	5.48%
Christian	2.14%
Sikh	0.03%
Other	0.03%

According to 2011 census, Veerappanchatram had a population of 84,453 with a sex-ratio of 992 females for every 1,000 males, much above the national average of 929. A total of 8,314 were under the age of six, constituting 4,215 males and 4,099 females. Scheduled Castes and Scheduled Tribes accounted for 7.28% and .04% of the population respectively. The average literacy of the town was 75.33%, compared to the national average of 72.99%. The town had a total of 24216 households. There were a total of 37,459 workers, comprising 173 cultivators, 440 main agricultural labourers, 624 in house hold industries, 35,357 other workers, 865 marginal workers, 21 marginal cultivators, 98 marginal agricultural labourers, 39 marginal workers in household industries and 707 other marginal workers. As per the religious census of 2011, Veerappanchatiram had 92.31% Hindus, 5.48% Muslims, 2.14% Christians, 0.03% Sikhs and 0.03% following other religions.
