= Kasipalayam (E) =

- Neighbourhood
- Location in Tamil Nadu, India Kasipalayam (India)
- Coordinates: 11.3155556°N 77.7091667°E
- Country: India
- State: Tamil Nadu
- District: Erode

Population (2011)
  - Total: 73,425

Languages
  - Official: Tamil
- Time zone: UTC+5:30 (IST)

Kasipalayam is a neighbourhood locality in the City of Erode. Until 2010, it was an independent Municipal Administrative body with a population of about 55,000 and in 2011, it has been officially combined with the Integrated Erode Municipal Corporation.

And presently, this has been converted as the Zonal Headquarters for one of the four zones of Erode Municipal Corporation, combining 15 Wards. The major residential areas in this zone are Shastri Nagar, Moolapalayam, Rangampalayam, K.K. Nagar, Solar, Kollampalayam, and Vendipalayam. As of 2011, the town had a population of 73,425. The Zonal office is located in Moolapalayam.

== Demographics ==
Religious census
Religion	Percent(%)
Hindu	85.9%
Muslim	5.45%
Christian	8.24%
Sikh	0.04%
Buddhist	0.01%
Jain	0.01%
Other	0.34%
No religion	0.02%

According to 2011 census, Kasipalayam had a population of 73,425 with a sex-ratio of 986 females for every 1,000 males, much above the national average of 929. A total of 6,832 were under the age of six, constituting 3,535 males and 3,297 females. Scheduled Castes and Scheduled Tribes accounted for 15.01% and 0.38% of the population respectively. The average literacy of the town was 78.73%, compared to the national average of 72.99%. The town had a total of 20822 households. There were a total of 31,689 workers, comprising 385 cultivators, 827 main agricultural labourers, 588 in house hold industries, 27,980 other workers, 1,909 marginal workers, 49 marginal cultivators, 68 marginal agricultural labourers, 79 marginal workers in household industries and 1,713 other marginal workers. As per the religious census of 2011, Kasipalayam had 85.9% Hindus, 5.45% Muslims, 8.24% Christians, 0.04% Sikhs, 0.01% Buddhists, 0.01% Jains, 0.34% following other religions and 0.02% following no religion or did not indicate any religious preference.
