= Brahmana Periya Agraharam =

Brahmana Periya-Agraharam BP Agraharam
- Panchayat Town
- Location in Tamil Nadu, India
- Coordinates: 11°23′24″N 77°41′54″E
- Country: India
- State: Tamil Nadu
- District: Erode

Population (2005)
  - Total: 27,275

Languages
  - Official: Tamil
- Time zone: UTC+5:30 (IST)
- PIN: 638 005, 638 301, 638 316
- Telephone code: 0424, 04256
- Vehicle registration: TN-33

Brahmana Periya-Agraharam is a neighborhood in the city of Erode, Tamil Nadu, India. It functioned as an independent Village Panchayat until the corporation expansion in 2011. It is now a part of Erode Municipal Corporation. It is located 7 km from Erode Junction and 4 km from Central Bus Terminus, Erode.

== Demographics ==
At the 2001 India census, Brahmana Periya (BP) Agraharam had a population of 27,275. Males constitute 51% of the population and females 49%. Brahmana Periya-Agraharam had an average literacy rate of 64%, higher than the national average of 59.5%; with male literacy of 71% and female literacy of 57%. 12% of the population were under 6 years of age.
