= Surampatti =

Neighbourhood in Erode district, Tamil Nadu, India

- Town
- Location in Tamil Nadu, India Surampatti (India)
- Coordinates: 11.3411111°N 77.6955556°E
- Country: India
- State: Tamil Nadu
- District: Erode

Population (2011)
  - Total: 41,782

Languages
  - Official: Tamil
- Time zone: UTC+5:30 (IST)
- PIN: 638 009
- Telephone code: 0424
- Vehicle registration: TN 33

Surampatti is a neighbourhood locality in the city of Erode, Tamil Nadu in India.

And presently, this has been converted as the Zonal Headquarters for one of the four zones of Erode Municipal Corporation, combining 15 Wards. It is one of the thickly populated locality near the city of Erode. The major Residential areas in this zone are Surampatti, Surampatti Valasu, Jaganathapuram, Bharathipuram, Teacher's Colony, NGGO Colony and Palayapalayam.

== Demographics ==
Religious census
Religion	Percent(%)
Hindu	89.04%
Muslim	7.33%
Christian	3.45%
Sikh	0.01%
Buddhist	0.01%
Jain	0.02%
Other	0.14%

According to 2011 census, Surampatti had a population of 41,782 with a sex-ratio of 991 females for every 1,000 males, much above the national average of 929. A total of 4,256 were under the age of six, constituting 2,201 males and 2,055 females. Scheduled Castes and Scheduled Tribes accounted for 6.97% and .03% of the population respectively. The average literacy of the town was 76.18%, compared to the national average of 72.99%. The town had a total of 11855 households. There were a total of 19,722 workers, comprising 62 cultivators, 88 main agricultural labourers, 799 in house hold industries, 17,952 other workers, 821 marginal workers, 10 marginal cultivators, 9 marginal agricultural labourers, 134 marginal workers in household industries and 668 other marginal workers. As per the religious census of 2011, Surampatti had 89.04% Hindus, 7.33% Muslims, 3.45% Christians, 0.01% Sikhs, 0.01% Buddhists, 0.02% Jains and 0.14% following other religions.
