= Periyasemur =

- Town
- Location in Tamil Nadu, India Periyasemur (India)
- Coordinates: 11.3700000°N 77.6908333°E
- Country: India
- State: Tamil Nadu
- District: Erode

Population (2011)
  - Total: 55,282
- Time zone: UTC+5:30 (IST)
- Postal code: 638004
- Vehicle registration: TN-86
- Postal Region: Coimbatore

Periyasemur is a neighbourhood of the city of Erode in the Indian state of Tamil Nadu. Until 2010, it was an independent Municipal Administrative body with a population of about 35,000 and in 2011, it has been officially combined with the Integrated Erode Municipal Corporation.

And presently, this has been converted as the Zonal Headquarters for one of the four zones of Erode Municipal Corporation, combining 15 Wards. The major Residential areas in this zone are Manickampalayam, Periyasemur, Soolai, EK Valasu and a part of Municipal Colony and Veerappampalayam. As of 2011, the town had a population of 55,282.

== Demographics ==
Religious census
Religion	Percent(%)
Hindu	93.75%
Muslim	3.34%
Christian	2.77%
Sikh	0.03%
Jain	0.02%
Other	0.08%

According to 2011 census, Periyasemur had a population of 55,282 with a sex-ratio of 960 females for every 1,000 males, much above the national average of 929. A total of 5,682 were under the age of six, constituting 2,880 males and 2,802 females. Scheduled Castes and Scheduled Tribes accounted for 7.56% and 0.04% of the population respectively. The average literacy of the town was 74.12%, compared to the national average of 72.99%. The town had a total of 15,198 households. There were a total of 24,119 workers, comprising 213 cultivators, 215 main agricultural labourers, 499 in house hold industries, 22,582 other workers, 610 marginal workers, 8 marginal cultivators, 19 marginal agricultural labourers, 63 marginal workers in household industries and 520 other marginal workers. As per the religious census of 2011, Periyasemur (M) had 93.75% Hindus, 3.34% Muslims, 2.77% Christians, 0.03% Sikhs, 0.02% Jains and 0.08% following other religions.
