= Erode City Municipal Corporation =

Administrative body of the city of Erode, Tamil Nadu, India

Type
- Type: Municipal Corporation of the Erode

Leadership
- Mayor: Mrs. Nagarathinam
- Deputy Mayor: Mr. Selvaraj
- Commissioner: Mr. Arpith Jain IAS
- District Collector: Mr. Kandasamy, IAS
- Superintendent of Police: Ms. Kiran Sruthi IPS
- Seats: 60

Elections
- Last Municipal Corporation Building, Erode election: 2022
- Next Municipal Corporation Building, Erode election: 2027

Website
- www.tnurbantree.tn.gov.in/erode/

Erode City Municipal Corporation is a civic administrative body that governs the City of Erode, India. The Corporation consists of a legislative body, headed by the City Mayor and an executive body headed by the Corporation Commissioner. The Corporation's headquarters is in the Municipal Corporation Building, Erode, near Panneer selvam Park.

== History ==
Erode Municipal Council came into existence in the year of 1871, covering a mere area of around 8.4 km^{2}. In 1917, Periyar E. V. Ramasamy the then Municipal Chairman of Erode proposed the expansion of town limits by merging the adjoining local bodies such as Veerappan Chatram, Vairapalayam and Periyasemur. But things were kept only on paper and in 1980 it was upgraded as a Special Grade Municipality with the same area of just 8.4 km^{2}.

In 2007, the State Government announced the upgradation of Erode Municipality as a Municipal Corporation. Erode City Municipal Corporation started functioning in 2008, administering the same civic limit of 8.4 km^{2} covering only the Central Business District with a population of about 1,59,728. In 2011, four Municipalities (Grade-III) of Surampatti, Veerappan Chatram, Periya Semur, Kasipalayam and the Town Panchayats of BP Agraharam and suriyampalayam along with Thindal, Villarasampatti, Gangapuram, Ellapalayam, Lakkapuram, 46 Pudur and Muthampalayam village panchayats were proposed to be merged with Erode City Municipal Corporation. Later, Lakkapuram and 46 Pudur Panchayats backed up the plan and the Erode City Municipal Corporation expanded to all other civic bodies, over an area of 109.52 km² lying between River Cauvery in the East and NH-544 Bypass in the West, containing more than half-a-million population as per the census of 2011.

Recently, in 2024, the district administration submitted a proposal to the state government for the expansion of Erode municipal corporation by merging the adjoining village panchayats of Erode Panchayat Union (Kathirampatti, Mettunasuvampalayam) and Modakkurichi Panchayat Union (Elavamalai, 46 Pudur).

=== Srinivasa Mudaliyar ===
Srinivasa Mudaliar was an Indian politician and social worker who served as Chairman of Erode municipality for three terms. He was the founder of Erode Waterworks, VOC Park, Erode and present urban structure of Erode

== Chronological list of chairmen ==
- A. M. Mac Riker (1871)
- Verner Alexander Brodie (1885–1888)
- K. C. Mahadeva Raja (1888–1891)
- G. M. Dance (1891–1893)
- T. M. Swaminatha Iyer (1893–1897)
- L. G. Moore (1897–1898)
- R. Ramachand Rao (1898–1899)
- M. Young (1899–1900)
- E. L. R. THornson (1900–1901)
- T. V. Gopalasami Iyer (1901–1902)
- Chappan Menon (1902–1903)
- A. W. Brough (1904–1905)
- M. V. Narayanasami Pillai (1905–1906)
- P. S. Singaravelu Pillai (1906–1907)
- A. Rangasamy Iyengar (1907–1908)
- W. H. H. Chatterton (1909–1910)
- U. R. Venkata Rao (1910–1911)
- T. Srinivasa Mudaliyar (1911–1917)
- E. V. Ramasamy Naicker (1917–1920)
- K. A. Kadir Mohideen Saheb (1920–1921)
- S. Sambasivam Pillai (1921–1925)
- T. Srinivasa Mudaliyar (1925–1927)
- K. Balasubbarayalu Naidu (1927–1930)
- Khan Saheb K. A. Sheik Dawood Saheb (1930–1935)
- K.N. Kuppusamy Pillai (1935–1940)
- R.K. Venketasamy Naicker (1947-1951)
- S. Meenakshisundara Mudaliyar (1953–1955)
- V.R.A. Manika Mudaliar
- S. Arangarasan (1986–1991, 1996–2001)
- Ma. subramaiyan (2001–2006)
- K. Kumar Murugesh (2006–2007)

== Chronological List of Mayors and Deputy Mayors ==
- K. Kumar Murugesh & B. Venkatachalam (2008–2011)
- Mrs. Mallika Paramasivam & K. C. Palanisamy (2011–2016)
- Mrs. Nagarathiram and Mr. Selvaraj ( 2022 - 2027)

== Zones and Wards ==
The area under Erode City Municipal Corporation has been administratively divided into 4 Zones with 15 Sub-divisions (Wards) in each. Each Ward containing nearly 10,000 of population and an average of 1.5lakhs in each Zone. The Corporation Mayor presides over the aligned 60 councillors who represent the 60 wards in the city. The Zonal headquarters were located at Suriyampalayam, Periyasemur, Surampatti and Kasipalayam for Zone-1, 2, 3 & 4 respectively.
