= Namakkal =

City in Tamil Nadu, India

Namakkal Namagiri
- City
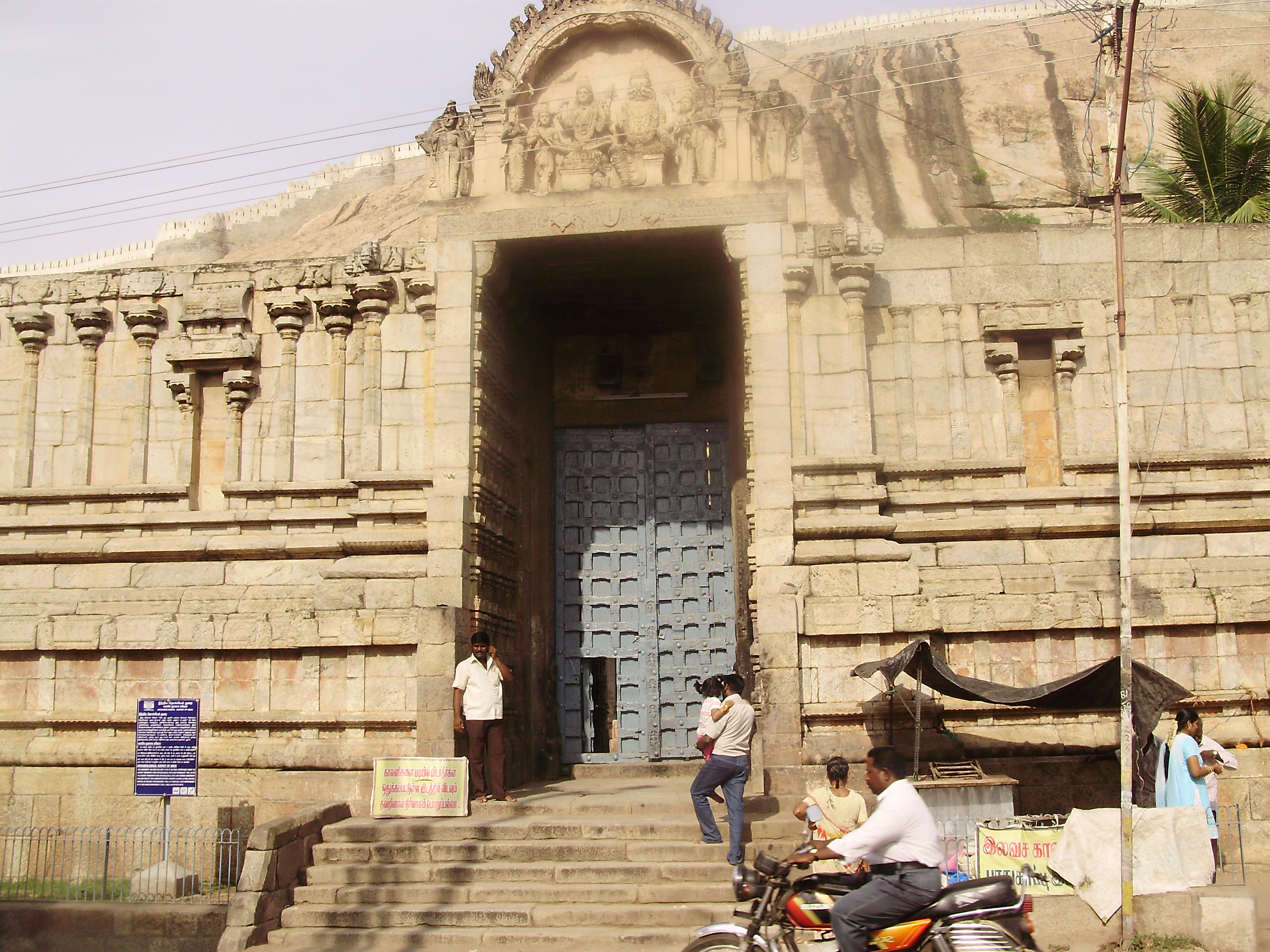
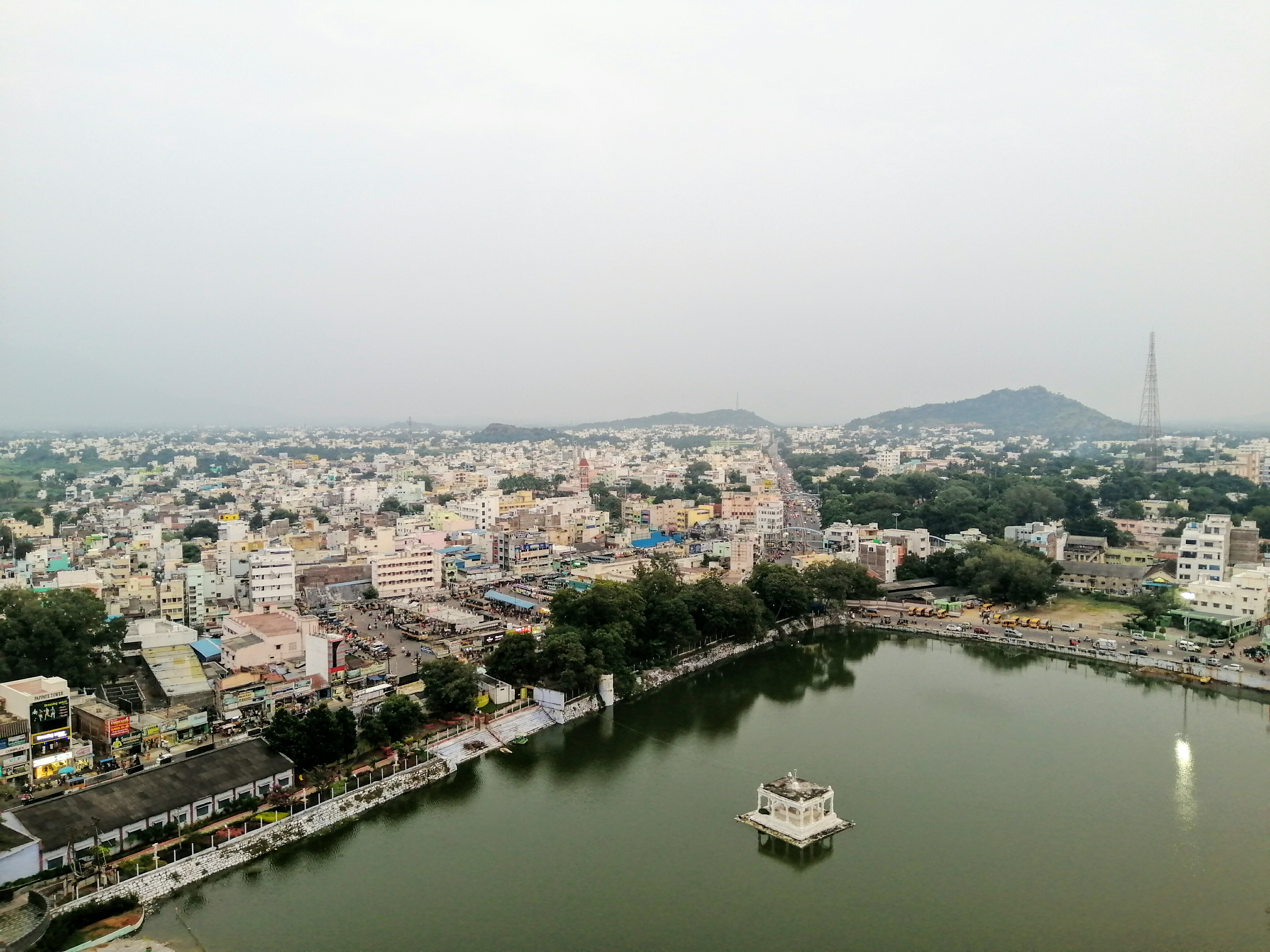
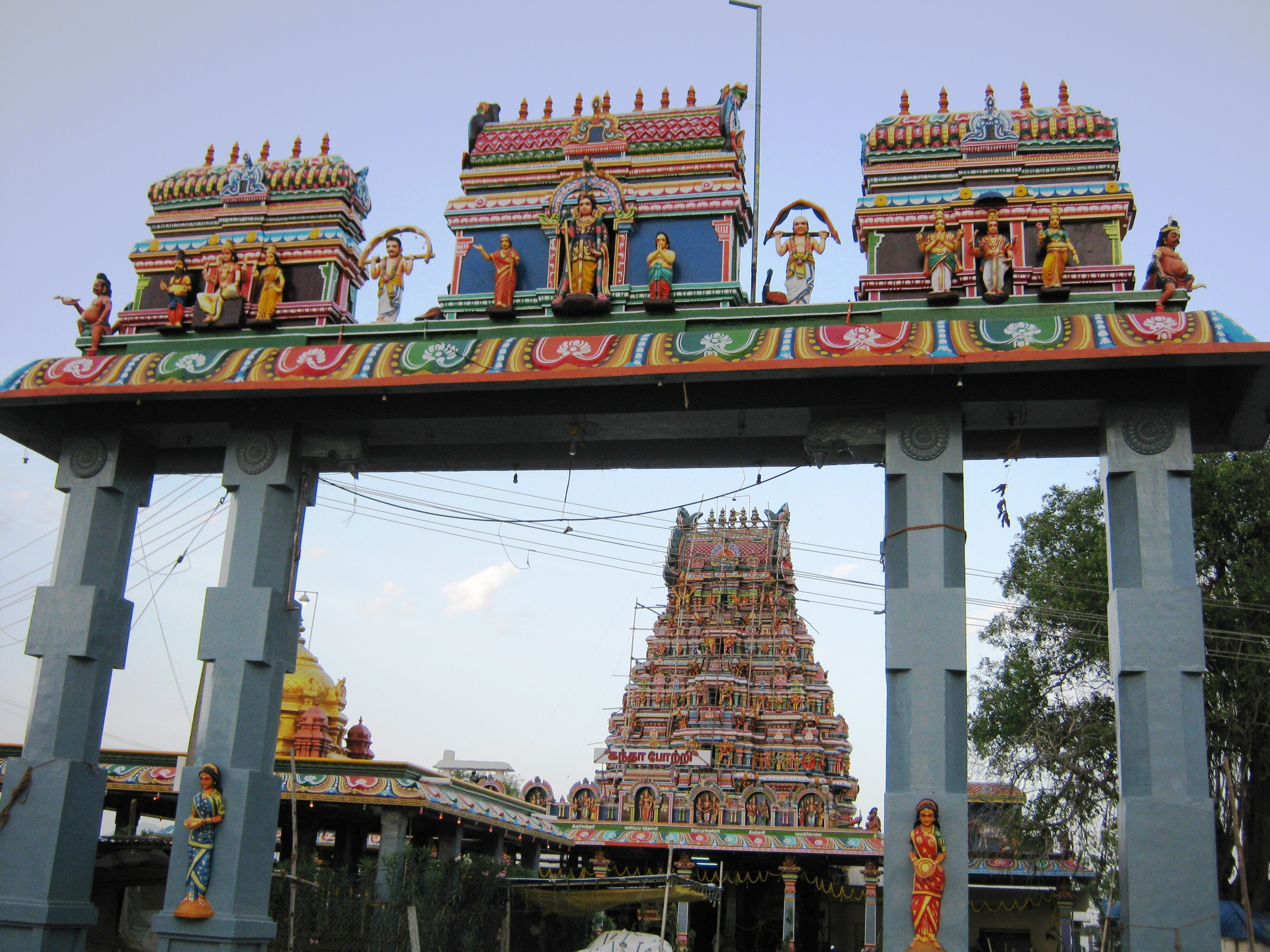
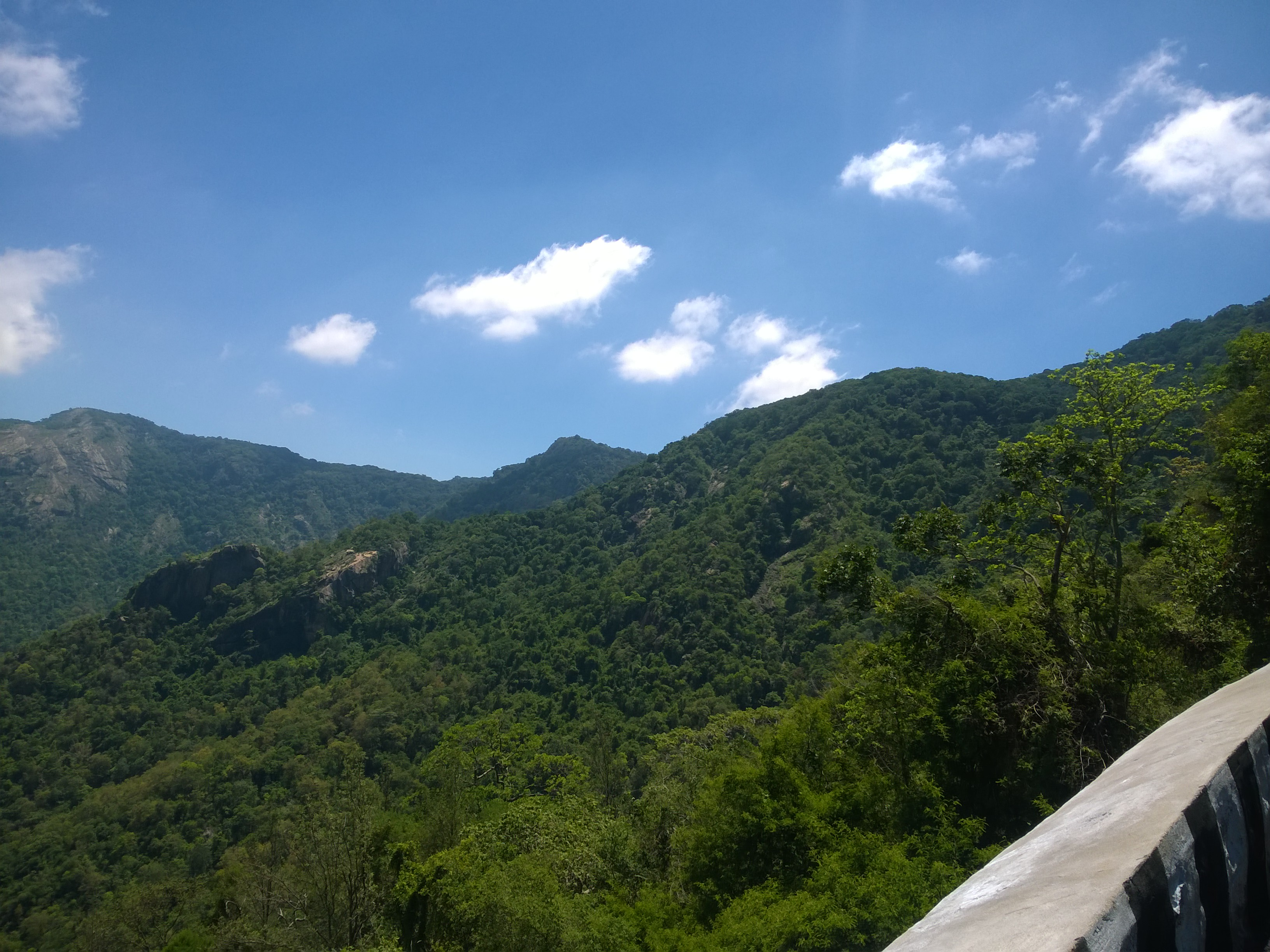
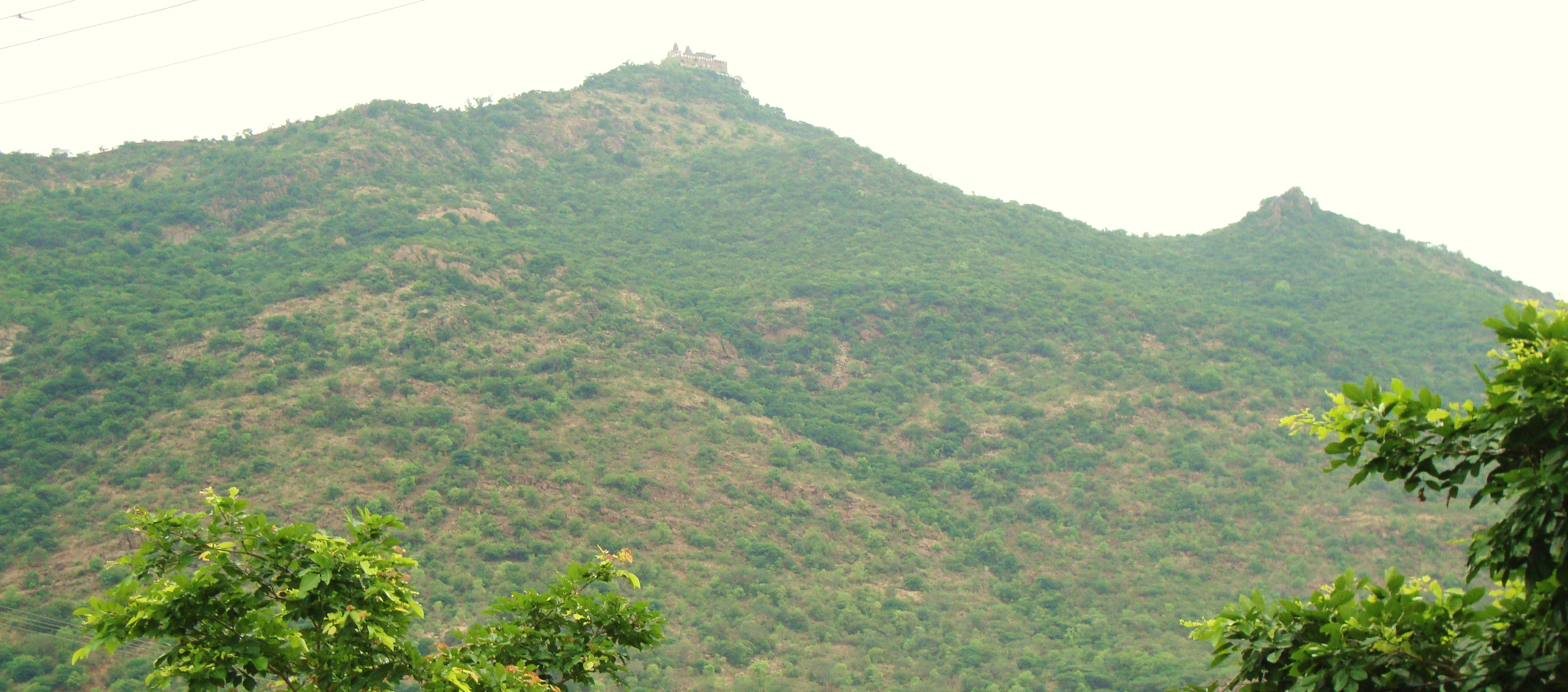
- Nicknames: Egg City, Poultry Town, Transport Town
- Location within Tamil Nadu
- Coordinates: 11°13′N 78°10′E
- Country: India
- State: Tamil Nadu
- District: Namakkal
- City: Namakkal
- Named for: Namakkal Rock in the middle of the town

Government
  - Type: Mayor–council government
  - Body: Namakkal City Municipal Corporation
  - Rank: 78(2001), 93(2011) In state
- Elevation: 218 m (715 ft)

Population (2011)
  - Total: 119,491
  - Density: 2,316/km^{2} (6,000/sq mi)
- Time zone: UTC+5:30 (IST)
- PIN: 6370-01, (02, 03 ... 6370-12)
- Telephone code: 91 - 04286
- Vehicle registration: TN-28(North), TN-88(South)
- Official language: Tamil
- Website: namakkal.nic.in

Namakkal (Tamil: [nɑːməkkəl]) is a city and the headquarters of Namakkal district, Tamil Nadu. It is the first ISO 14001-2004 certified municipality in Asia for environmental management, specifically the provision and maintenance of water supply, solid waste and sewage management, town planning, lighting and other social services. Namakkal is known as the Egg City due to its large egg production, and as Transport City.

== History ==
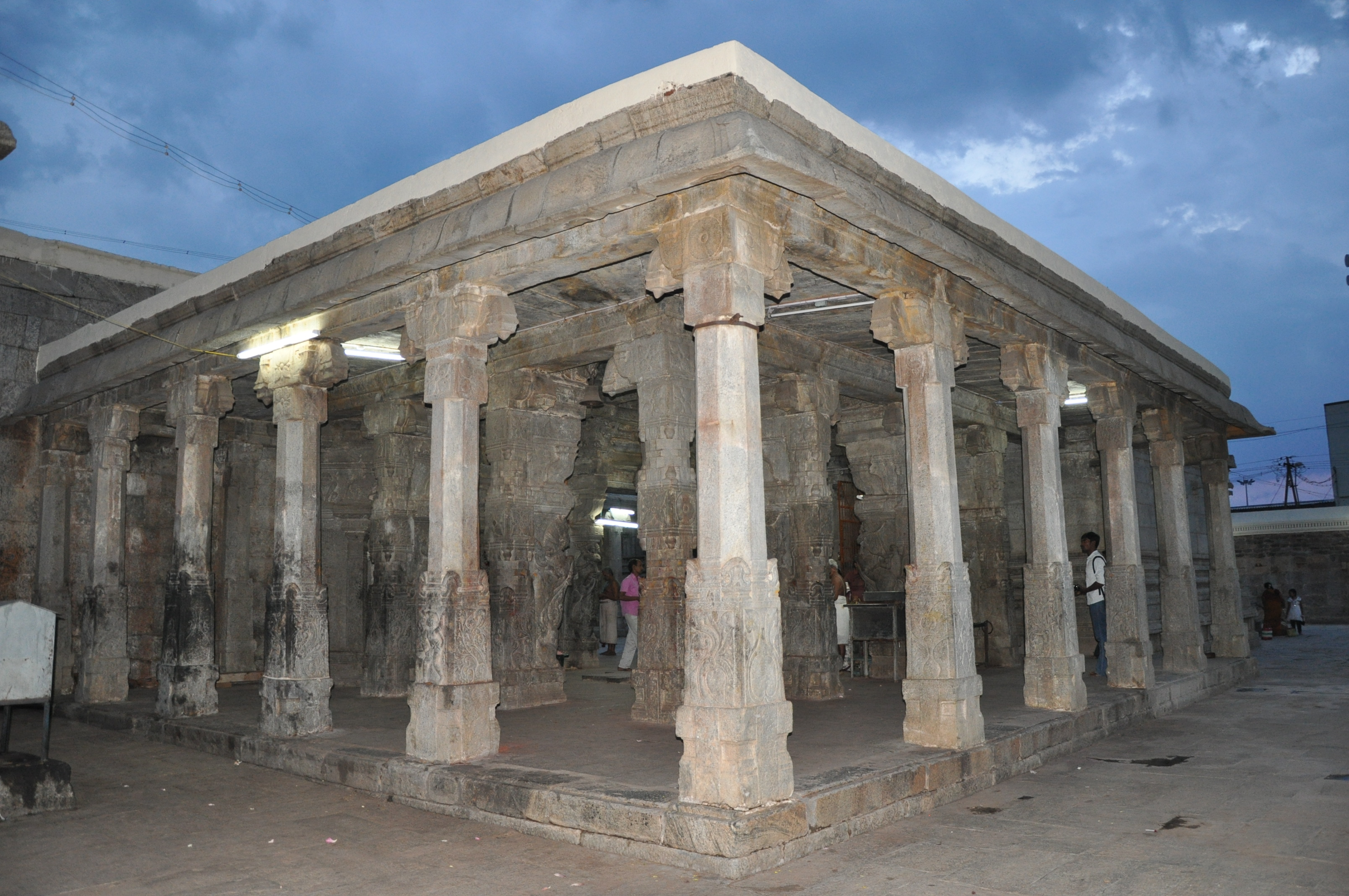
Mandapam in the Narasimhaswamy temple

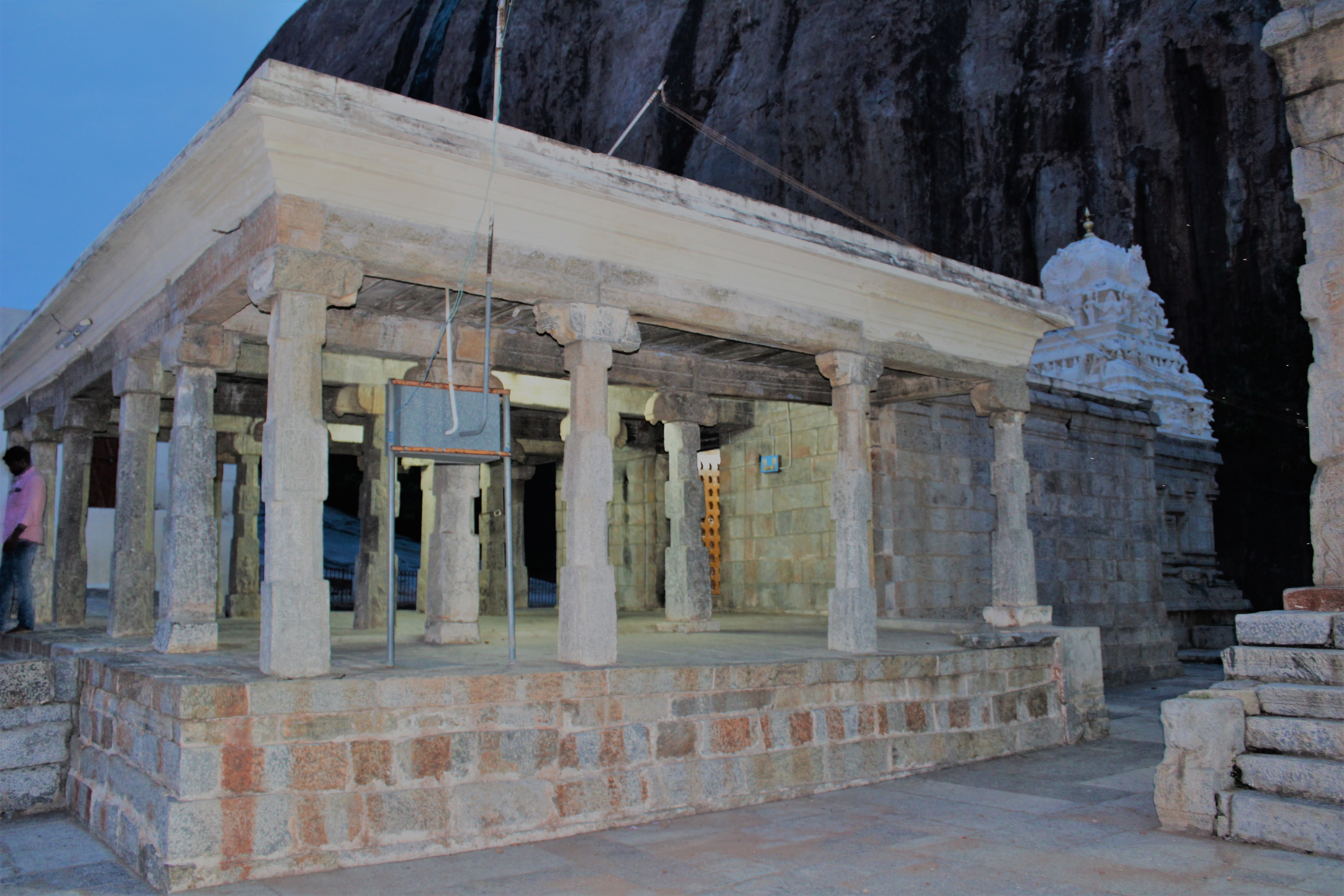
Ranganatha temple

Namakkal is a historic city with references back to at least the 6th century. The name Namakkal derives from Namagiri, which is the name of the single rock formation at the center of the town dedicated to Lord Vishnu. The rock is 65 meters high and over a kilometre in circumference.

There are two cave temples namely Sri Namagiri Thayar sametha Sri Narasimhaswamy Perumal Temple and Sri Ranganatha Perumal Temple which are excavated in this Namagiri hill and is believed to be built during the 6th century CE by the Satyaputra Kings and Pandya kings with the help of rock-cut architecture style and various inscriptions. Historian Soundara Rajan places the date to a pre-Varagunan I (800–830 CE) era on the 8th century. Based on the paleography and rock-cut architecture, P. R. Srinivasan has placed it at 6th century. Most of the historians have compared the temples with similar architectural elements found in Badami Caves (6th century) and a possible influence. There are few inscriptions in the temple, especially an undated inscription in Grantha Characters at the Ranganatha temple which are similar to the inscriptions in the Ganesha Ratha in Mahabalipuram, which is in another cave in the upper part of the hill. Another inscription mentions it as Adiyendra Vishnu Grham which evidently shows that the cave was excavated by the Satyaputra Kings, the recently discovered inscription not only confirms this but also mentions the king's name as Gunasila (dated 500 CE). Historians believe it is possible that both the temples were built during the same period.

Over this massive rock, is a fort, Namakkal Fort. Kongu nadu a small kingdom who ruled Namakkal during the 16th century. During Sangam age, Namakkal region formed a part of the historical Kongu Nadu region ruled by Cheras. It is believed that Tippu Sultan hid himself in this fort for some time to escape the British. The fort was not built by Tippu Sultan but he occupied it for a brief period of time. Later the fort was captured by British. The front side of the hill is called Thiru. Vi. Ka. Paarai and today is used by taxis as their stand.

Namakkal is a part of Kongu Nadu which was hotly contested and coveted by both the ancient Pallavas and the Pandyas. Namakkal was in the hands of Atiakula King called Gunasila who had an alliance with Pallava King through marriage. Later the taluk was overrun by the Cholas in the Mandalam. After the struggle between the Cheras, Cholas and Pandiyan, the Hoysalas rose to power and had control till the 14th century followed by the Vijayanagara Kings until 1565 AD. Then the Telugu Madurai Nayaks came to power in 1623 AD. Two of the polygons of Thirumalai Nayak, namely, Ramachandra Nayaka and Gatti Mudaliars, ruled the Salem area. The Namakkal Fort is reported to have been built by Ramachandra Nayakas. After about 1625 AD, the area successively came successively under the rule of Muslim Sultans of Bijapur and Golkonda, Mysore kings and then the Marathas.

Hyder Ali came to power in about 1750 AD. During this period, it was a history of power struggle between Hyder Ali and later Tippu, with the British. Namakkal was held by Killdhar (Caption) of Hyder Ali until it was captured by British in 1768. For a brief period during late 18th and early 19th century Namakkal was under Tiruchirappalli district of British Rule. Later, Namakkal was transferred back to Salem District. Then at 01-01-1997 finally announced as a separate district from Salem District.

Mahatma Gandhi held a public meeting in 1933 in Namakkal under the slope of the Namakkal rock.

== Demographics ==
Religious census
Religion	Percent(%)
Hindu	88.98%
Muslim	9.29%
Christian	1.48%
Sikh	0.01%
Buddhist	0.0%
Jain	0.01%
Other	0.23%
No religion	0.01%

According to 2011 census, Namakkal had a population of 55,145 with a sex-ratio of 1,015 females for every 1,000 males, much above the national average of 929. A total of 5,002 were under the age of six, constituting 2,609 males and 2,393 females. Scheduled Castes and Scheduled Tribes accounted for 13.7% and .5% of the population respectively. The average literacy of the town was 82.52%, compared to the national average of 72.99%. The town had a total of 15008 households. There were a total of 21,572 workers, comprising 133 cultivators, 264 main agricultural labourers, 562 in house hold industries, 19,646 other workers, 967 marginal workers, 22 marginal cultivators, 24 marginal agricultural labourers, 151 marginal workers in household industries and 770 other marginal workers. As per the religious census of 2011, Namakkal had 88.98% Hindus, 9.29% Muslims, 1.48% Christians, 0.01% Sikhs, 0.0% Buddhists, 0.01% Jains, 0.23% following other religions and 0.01% following no religion or did not indicate any religious preference.

== Tourism ==
=== Namakkal Anjaneyar temple ===
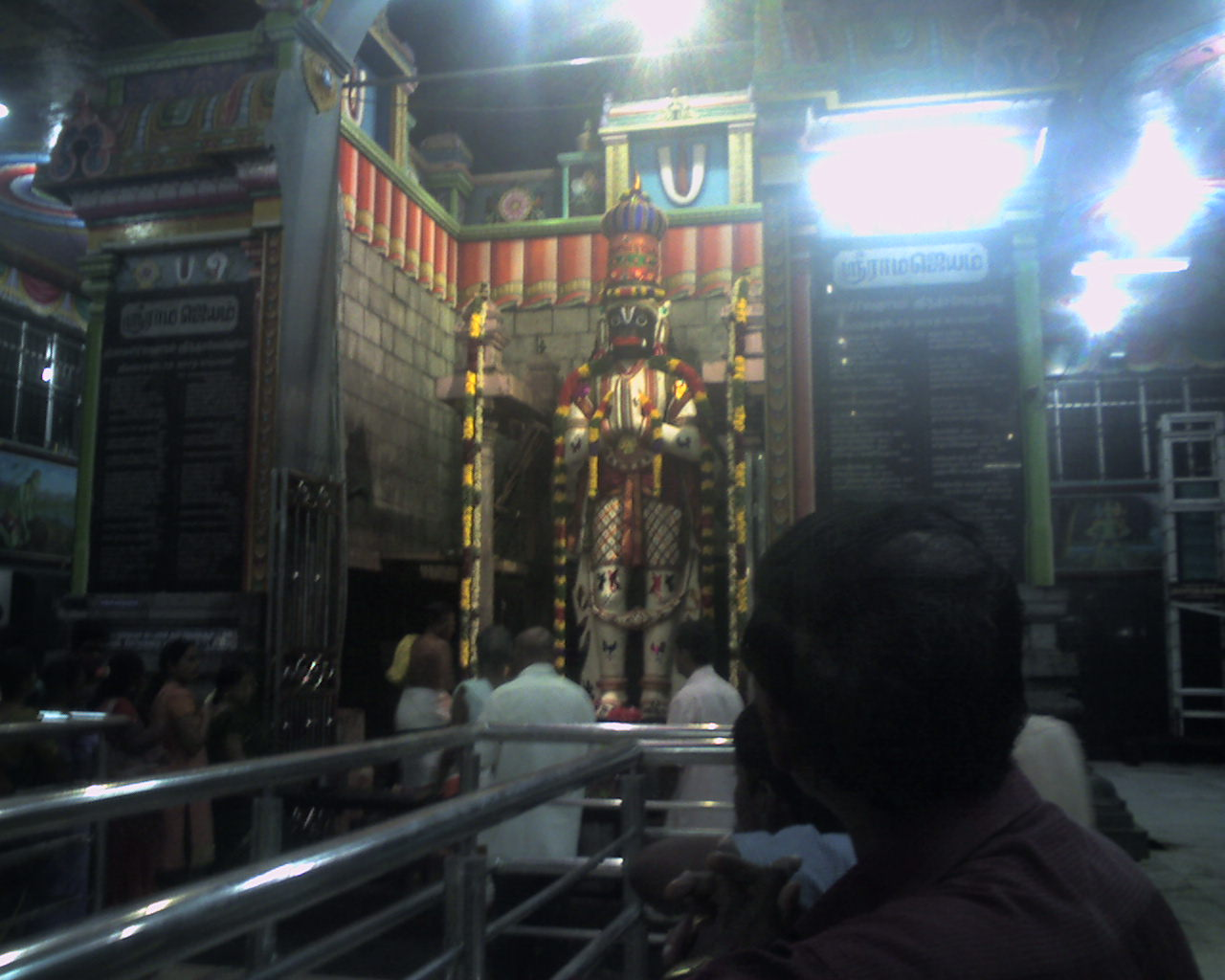
Namakkal Anjaneyar Temple

Namakkal Anjaneyar temple is located in Namakkal, and is dedicated to the Hindu god Hanuman. It is constructed in the Dravidian style of architecture. The image of Anjaneyar is 18 ft (5.5 m) tall, making it one of the tallest images of Hanuman in ancient temples of India. The image of Anjaneyar is carved out of a single stone and is existing from the 5th century. There is no roof over the sanctum and Anjaneyar has a unique iconography sporting a sword in his waist and holding a garland made of saligrama. The temple is considered one of the prominent temples in the Tamil Nadu state and the country. The Agamam is followed by "Sri Vaikhanasam".

=== Namagiri Lakshmi Narasimar swami temple ===
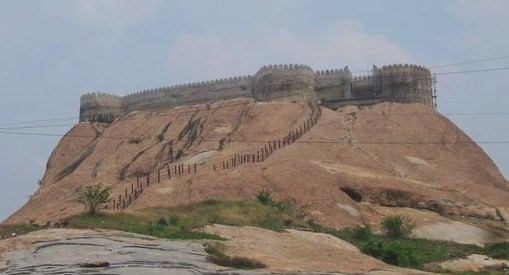
Namakkal Fort

Namagiri Lakshmi Narasimhaswami Temple of Lord Vishnu has the form of Sri Narasimha Swami. The temple is believed to be built during the 8th century by the Pandya kings in Rock-cut architecture. The temple does not find a mention in Naalayira Divya Prabhandams, and thus is not listed in Divya desam series of 108 temples.

Annual car festival for the Lord Narasimmaswamy temple is celebrated in March and April every year (Tamil Month "Panguni") as per "Sri Vaikhanasa Ahamam".

=== Namakkal Fort ===
Namakkal Fort is a historic fort present in Namakkal in Namakkal district in the South Indian state of Tamil Nadu. The rock fort is on the summit of the rock, and the remnants in brick and stone still bear the brunt of the skirmishes to lay siege to the fort by the Cholas in the 9th century. The fort was reinforced during the reign of kongu Vellalars in the 17th century. The fort is located on the top of a hillock made of a single rock, 75 m (246 ft) tall. There is a temple and a mosque that are located within the fort, both of which are tourist attractions of the town. In modern times, the fort is under the control of the Archaeological Department of the Government of Tamil Nadu.

The Ranganathaswamy temple is another rock-cut temple alongside the fort. Ranganathaswamy cave temple is believed to have been built by the Pallavas.

== Geography ==
Namakkal is located at 11.23°N 78.17°E. It has an average elevation of 218 metres or 715 feet. It is close to Kolli Hills – which are part of the Eastern Ghats. The closest significant river is the Kaveri and it is located 360 kilometres or 224 miles southwest of Chennai and 250 kilometres or 155 miles south of Bangalore.Namakkal's Twin Town Karur is located 34 kilometres or 21 miles South across the Kaveri.

Tourism in the district of Namakkal is based on the temples namely Namakkal anjaneyar temple and Namagiri amman temple of the area. The Kolli Hills, an outlier of the Eastern Ghats, constitute a prominent mountain range 45 kilometres (28 mi) away from Namakkal. It is eighteen miles or twenty eight kilometers long (from north to south), twelve miles or nineteen kilometers wide (from east to west) and the Koll block is spread over an area of 441.4 square kilometers. When viewed from the plains of the Namakkal district, the mountain looks like a flat-topped mass. The mountain has been inhabited from prehistoric times. It is much celebrated in the Tamil Literature of the Sangam Age and at least eleven poets describe about it in their poems. A Shiva Temple, known as the Arappalleeswarar Temple, dates back to twelfth century and is located at Periakoviloor near the waterfalls called Akasa Gangai. An ancient and powerful deity called Kolli Paavai of Ettukkai Amman is also at the Kolli Hills. It attracts large pilgrims and was originally a Jain retreat.

=== Climate ===
Namakkal has a tropical savanna climate (Köppen Aw) with a wet season from May to October, a relatively mild "cool" season from November to February, and a sweltering "hot" season in March and April.

Climate data for NMKL (Namakkal City)
Month	Jan	Feb	Mar	Apr	May	Jun	Jul	Aug	Sep	Oct	Nov	Dec	Year
Record high °C (°F)	32.8 (91.0)	35.9 (96.6)	37.3 (99.1)	39.2 (102.6)	48.9 (120.0)	48.1 (118.6)	38.3 (100.9)	36.3 (97.3)	30.3 (86.5)	28.4 (83.1)	27.7 (81.9)	27.1 (80.8)	48.9 (120.0)
Mean daily maximum °C (°F)	27.9 (82.2)	30.7 (87.3)	33.1 (91.6)	34.0 (93.2)	33.3 (91.9)	29.6 (85.3)	28.3 (82.9)	27.8 (82.0)	28.6 (83.5)	28.2 (82.8)	27.2 (81.0)	26.5 (79.7)	29.6 (85.3)
Mean daily minimum °C (°F)	15.8 (60.4)	17.5 (63.5)	20.0 (68.0)	22.0 (71.6)	21.7 (71.1)	20.4 (68.7)	19.9 (67.8)	19.8 (67.6)	19.8 (67.6)	19.6 (67.3)	18.0 (64.4)	16.2 (61.2)	19.2 (66.6)
Record low °C (°F)	7.8 (46.0)	9.4 (48.9)	11.1 (52.0)	14.4 (57.9)	16.7 (62.1)	16.7 (62.1)	16.1 (61.0)	14.4 (57.9)	15.0 (59.0)	13.2 (55.8)	9.6 (49.3)	8.9 (48.0)	7.8 (46.0)
Average rainfall mm (inches)	1.9 (0.07)	5.4 (0.21)	18.5 (0.73)	41.5 (1.63)	107.4 (4.23)	106.5 (4.19)	112.9 (4.44)	147.0 (5.79)	212.8 (8.38)	168.3 (6.63)	48.9 (1.93)	15.7 (0.62)	986.8 (38.85)
Average rainy days	0.2	0.4	1.1	3.1	6.7	6.2	7.2	9.9	9.8	8.3	3.8	1.4	58.1
Average relative humidity (%)	60	52	30	43	60	72	76	79	76	73	70	68	63
Mean monthly sunshine hours	262.3	247.6	271.4	257.0	241.1	136.8	111.8	114.3	143.6	173.1	190.2	211.7	2,360.9
Source 1: Indian Meteorological Department
Source 2: NOAA (humidity and sun: 1971–1990)

== Platinum ==
A platinum deposit has been found in Sittampoondi village near Namakkal, with a total estimated deposit of 3.7 tonnes.

== Politics ==
Namakkal assembly constituency is part of Namakkal (Lok Sabha constituency). V. S. Matheswaran serves as M.P. for Namakkal Constituency. C.S.Dilip serves as M.L.A. for Namakkal.

== Transport ==
=== Road ===
Buses ply to cities in Tamil Nadu like Salem, Erode, Trichy, Karur, Coimbatore, Chennai, Madurai and Dindigul. Namakkal is connected to the rest of India through National Highway 44 Buses from Trichy or Madurai will pass through Namakkal to reach Salem or Bangalore.

=== Railway ===
A new broad-gauge railway line from Salem to Karur via Namakkal started its service on 25 May 2013. There are trains daily from/to Salem, Karur, Chennai Central, Bangalore, Dindigul, Palani, Madurai, Tirunelveli, Nagercoil, Pollachi and Palakkad.

Salem Jn to Karur Jn

- Rasipuram railway station
- Puduchatram railway station
- Kalangani railway station
- Namakkal railway station
- Laddivadi railway station
- Mohanur railway station

Salem Jn to Erode Jn

- Anangur railway station
- Cauvery railway station

=== Airports ===
The nearest airports are Salem Airport (52 km), Coimbatore International Airport (153 km), and Trichy International airport (85 km). Salem Airport started from 15 November 2009.

== Gallery ==
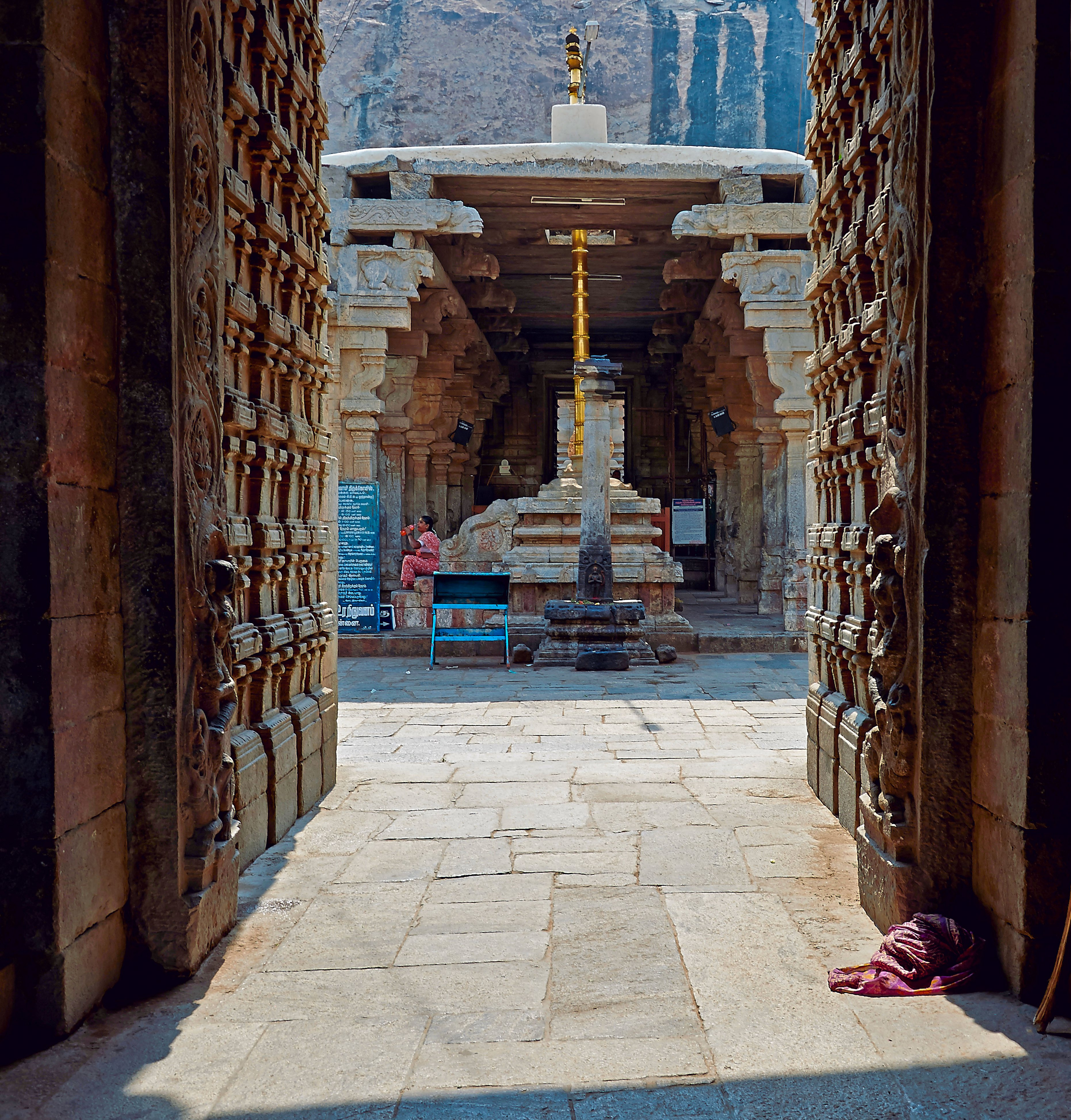
Entrance of the Narasimhaswamy Temple

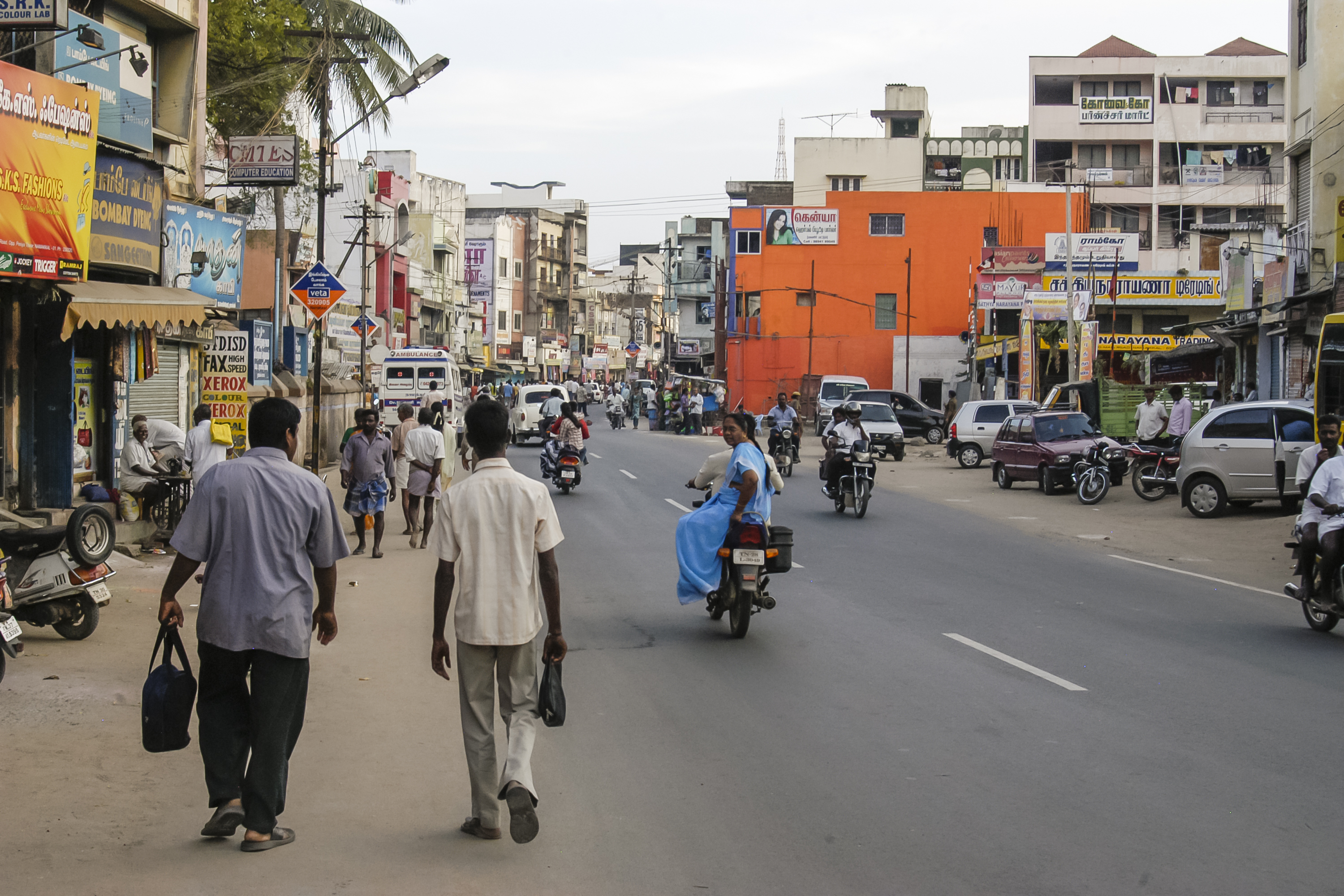
City street scene in Namakkal

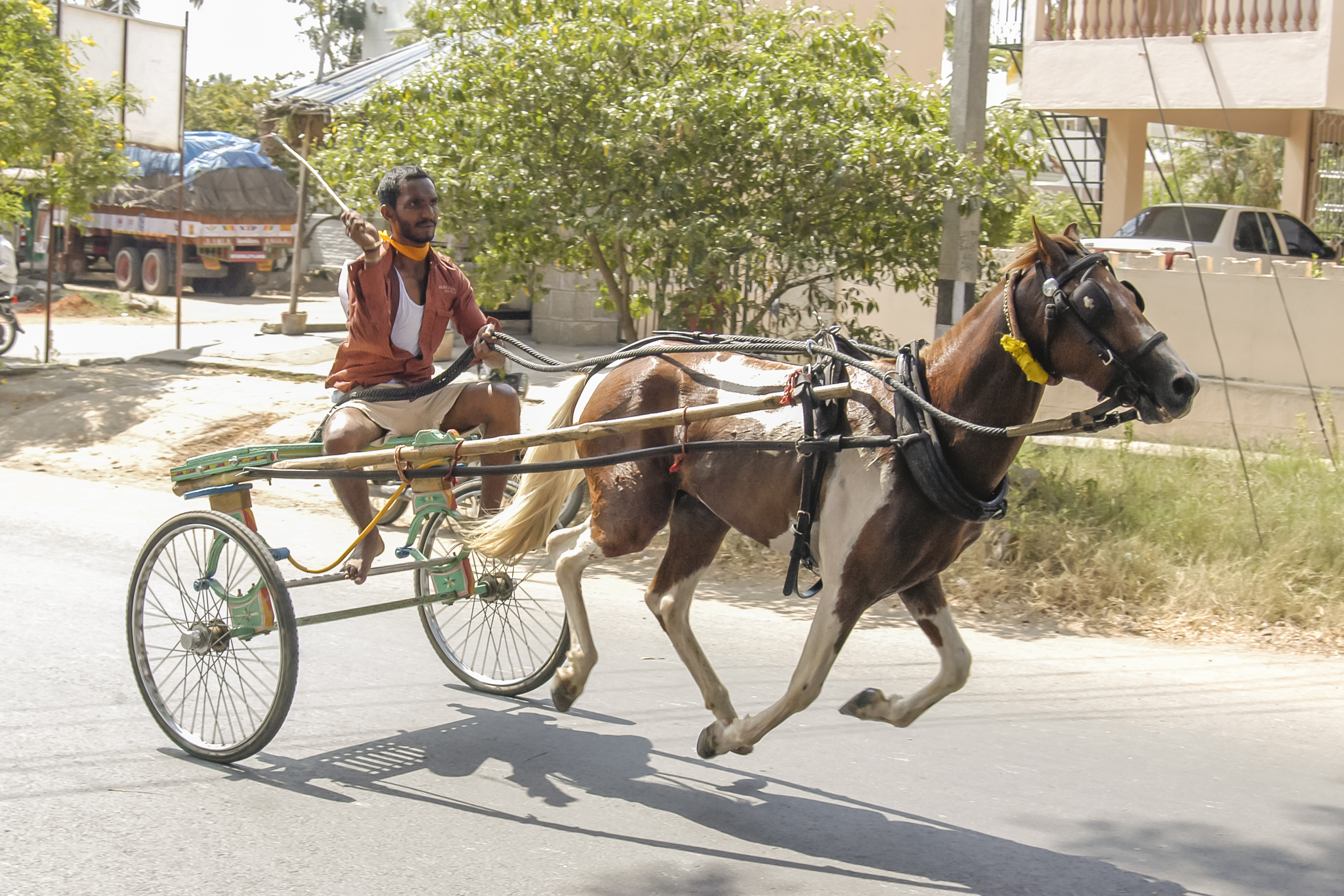
Rekla racer in Namakkal

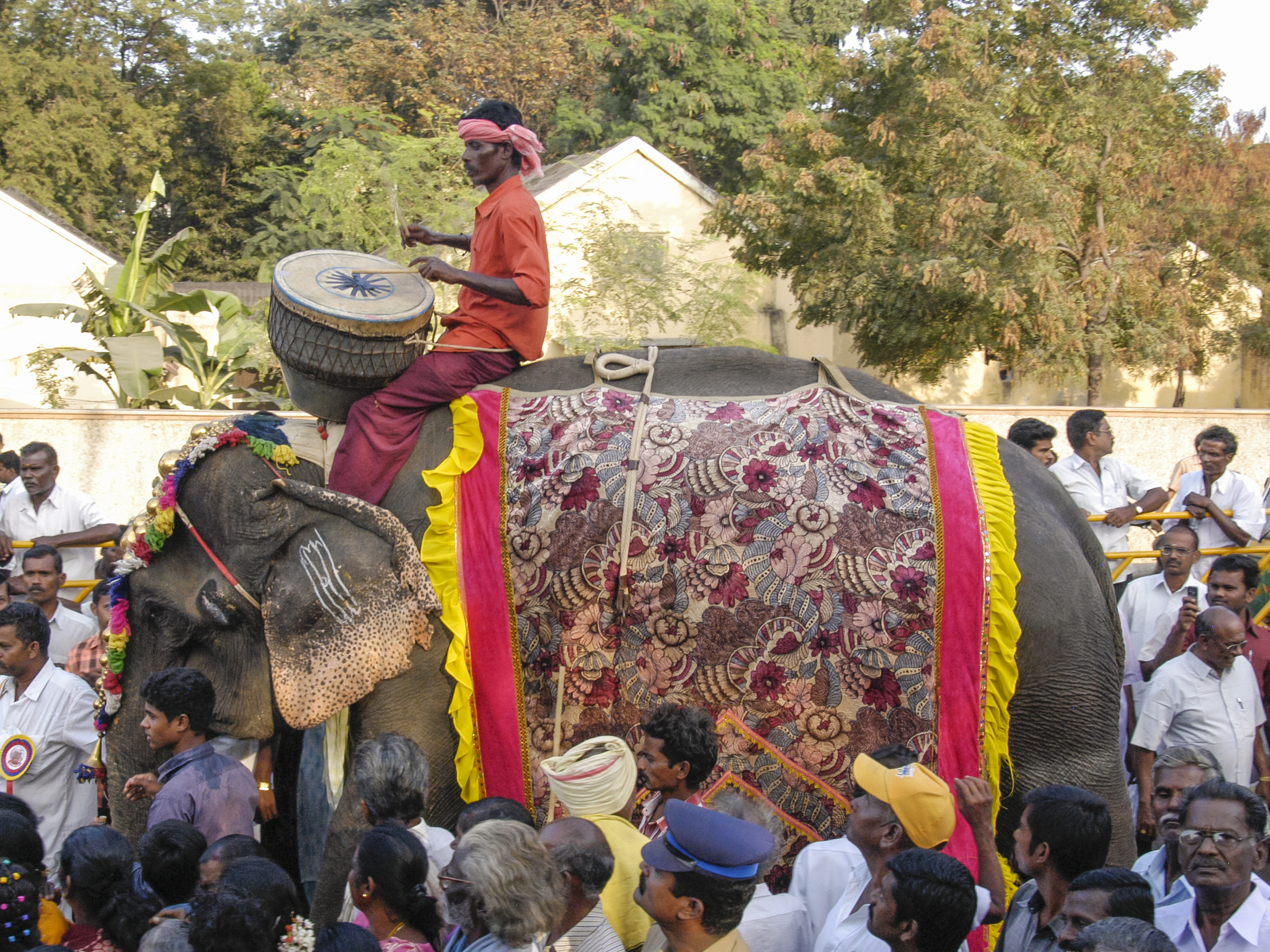
Man riding an elephant in a Pongal Festival Parade in Namakkal

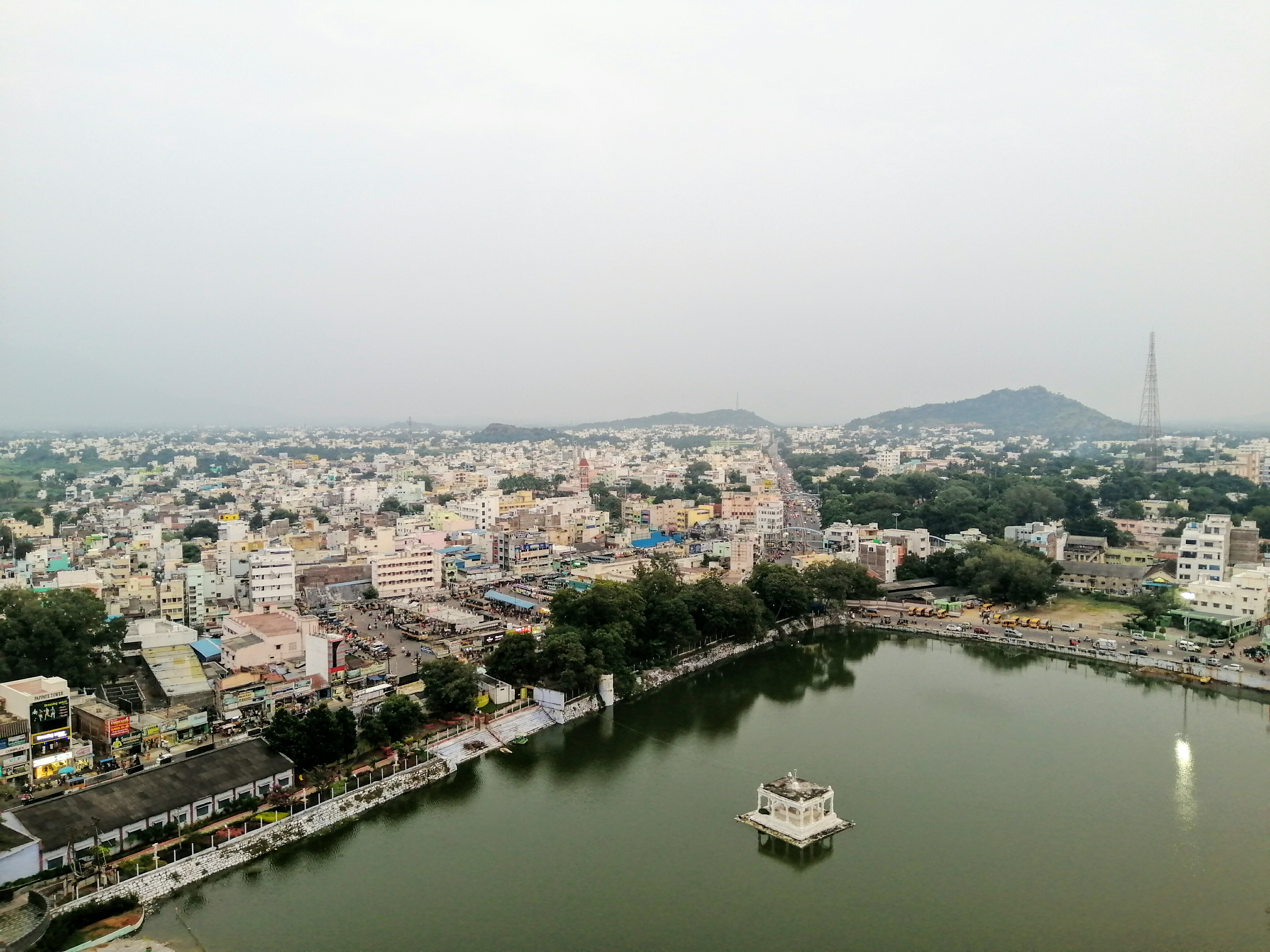

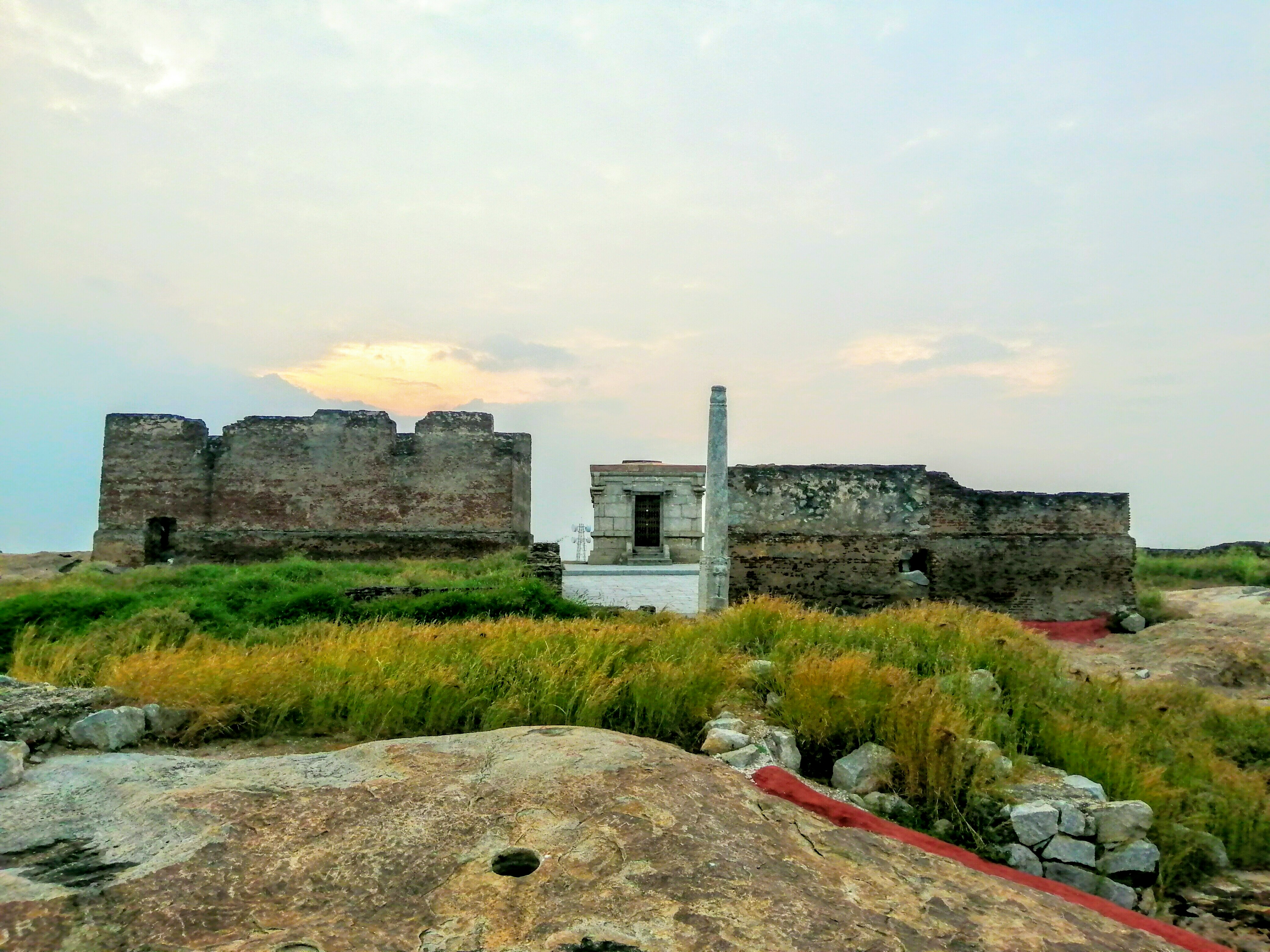

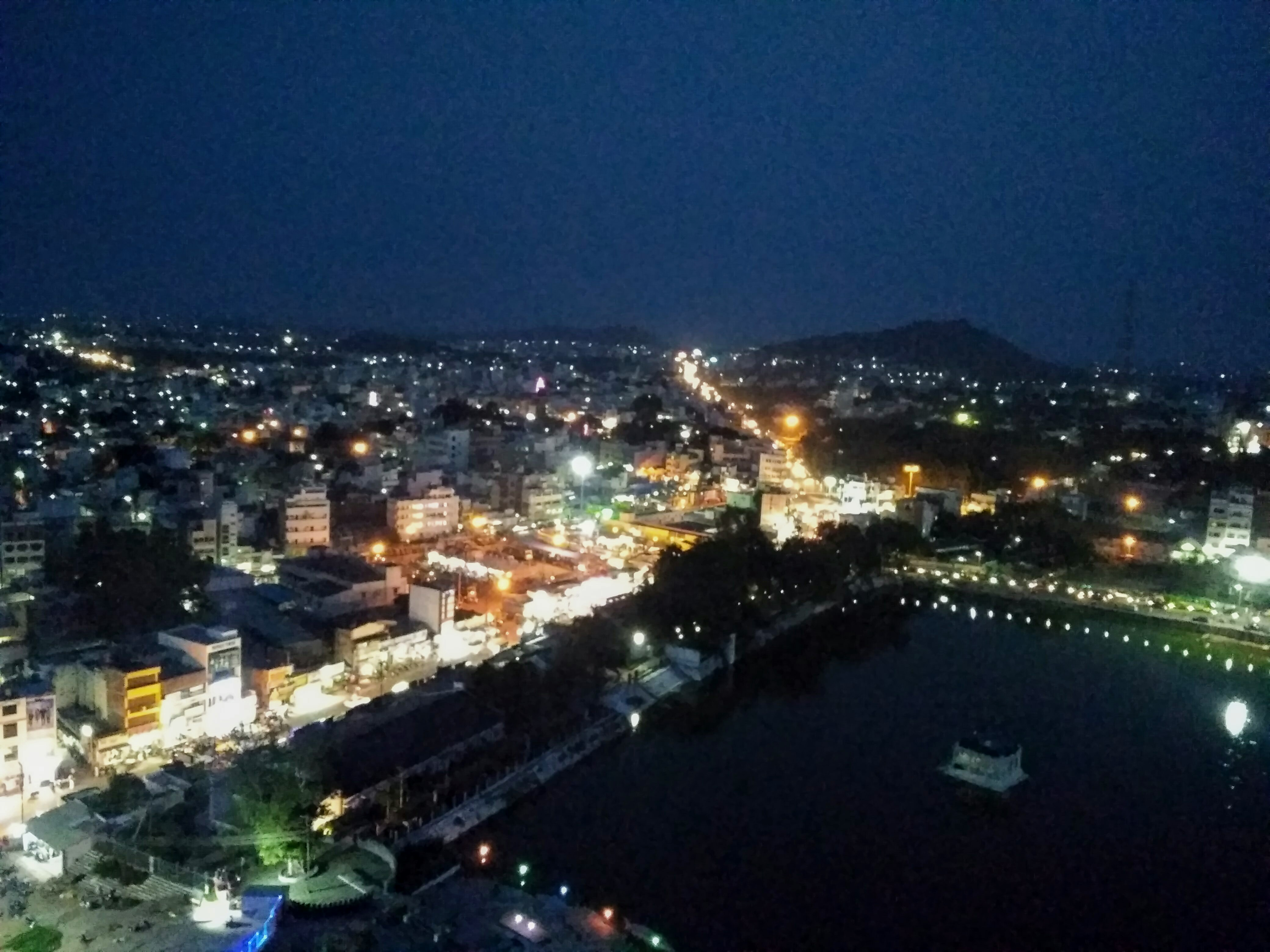

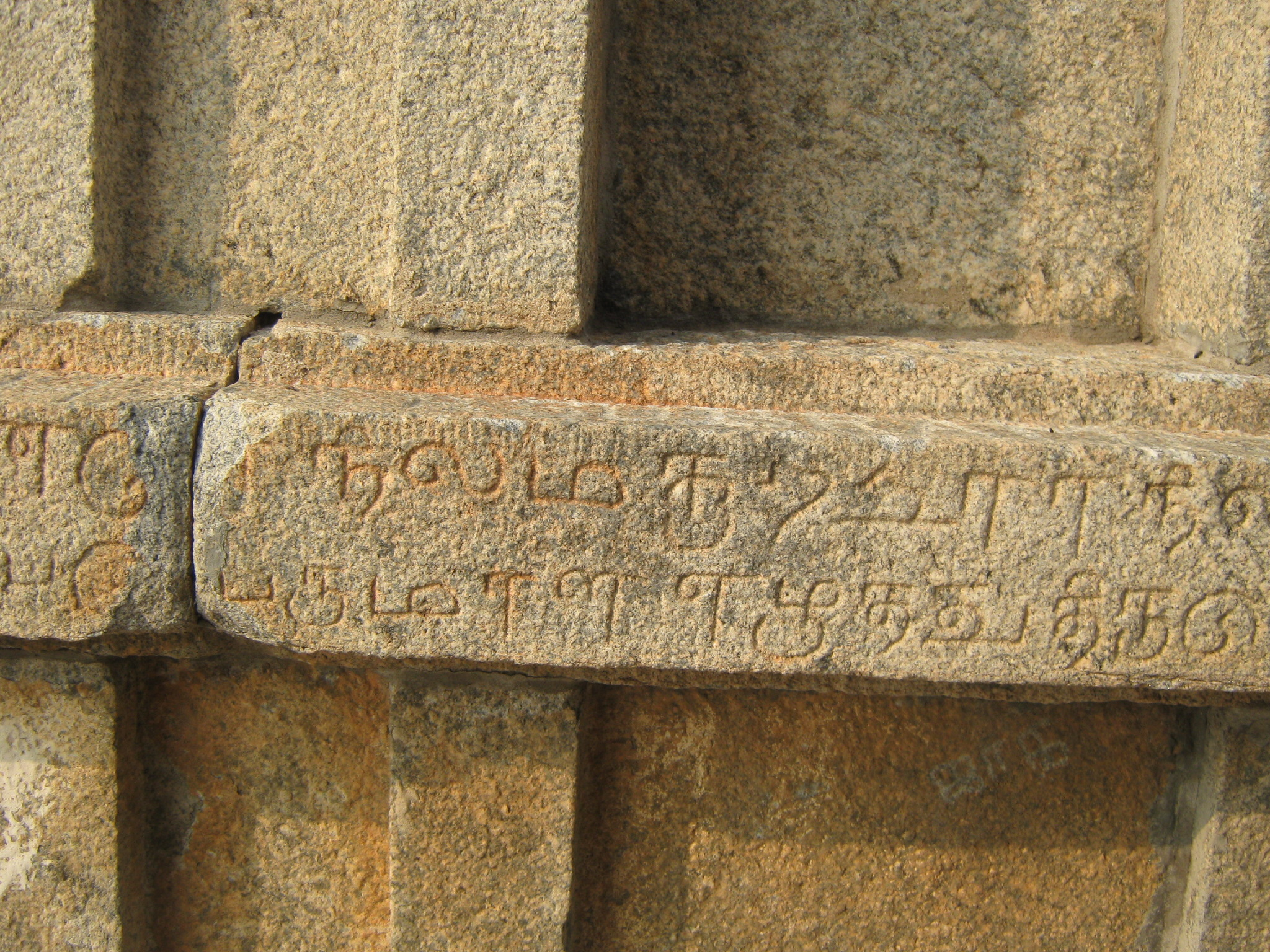

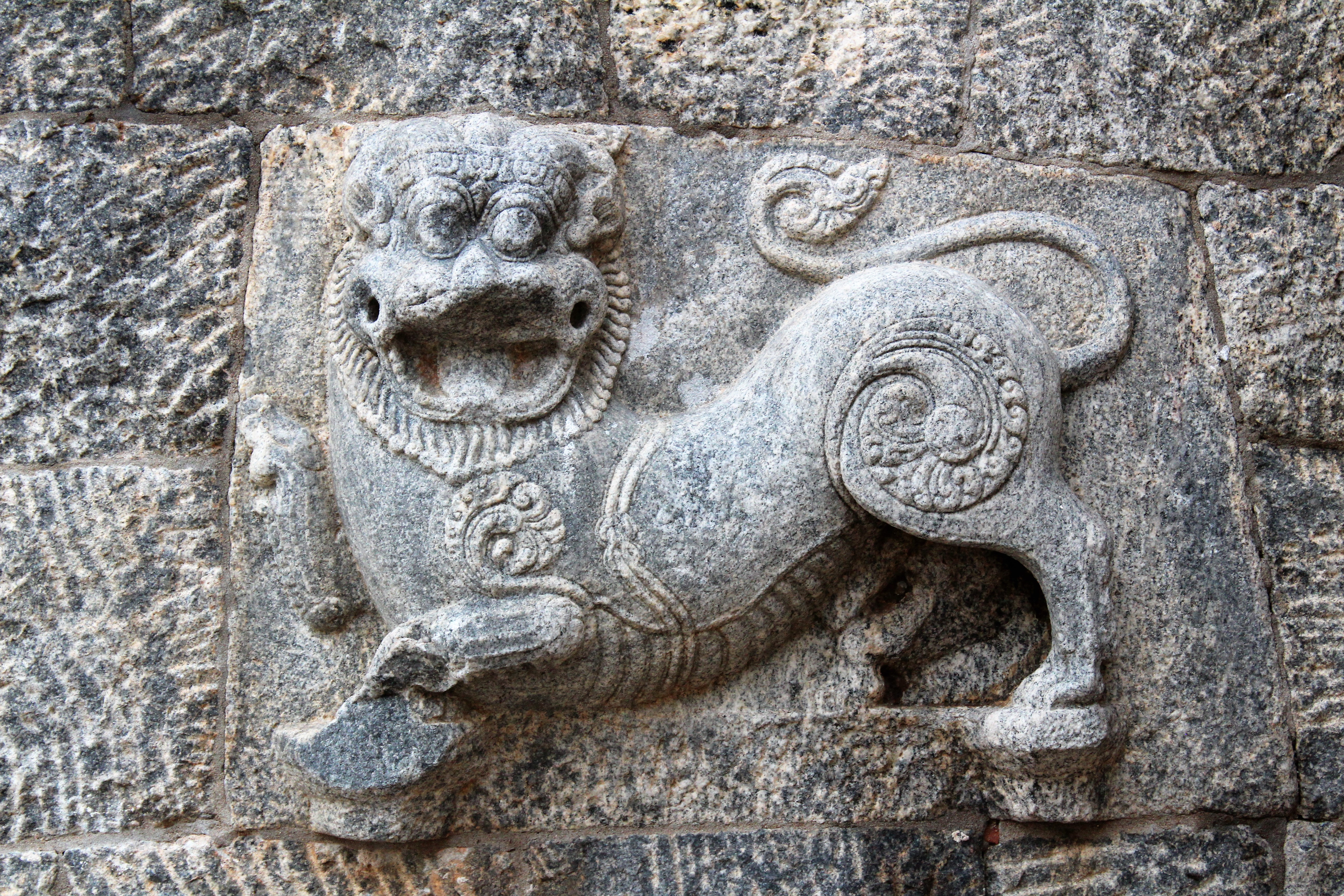

== See also ==
- Venkatarama Ramalingam Pillai (1888–1972), a prominent freedom fighter from Namakkal
- Kalangani
- Sendamangalam
- Vettambadi
- Jedarpalayam
- Kolli Hills
- Vagurampatty
- Mohanur
