= Thirumalaipatty =

- Village
- Location in Tamil Nadu, India Thirumalaipatty (India)
- Coordinates: 11°21′16.254″N 78°13′1.4088″E
- Country: India
- State: Tamil Nadu
- District: Namakkal

Government
  - Type: சேந்தமங்கலம்

Languages
  - Official: தமிழ்
- Time zone: UTC+5:30 (IST)
- PIN: 637404
- Telephone code: 04286

Thirumalaipatty is a significant village located in the Namakkal District of the southern state of Tamil Nadu, India. It is situated 8 km east of Pudhansandai (NH-7), 7 km west of Kalappanaickenpatti, and 15 km north of Rasipuram. The name Thirumalaipatti derives from "Three Hills," which refers to the three hills that surround the village. The people of this village have a strong culture and tradition.

== Geography ==
Thirumalaipatty is located in the southern state of Tamil Nadu, India and is situated approximately 20 kilometres from Namakkal and 44 kilometres from Salem. The village is located within the foothills of the Kolli Hills, which are a tourist destination in the region. The Kolli Hills foothill area is approximately 20 kilometres from Thirumalaipatty and attracts visitors for its scenery, trekking trails, and waterfalls.

== Climate and places ==
This village enjoys a pleasant climate with mild temperatures throughout the year. However, the climate may vary slightly depending on the seasons. Agriculture is the primary source of livelihood for the village residents, and the fertile land is ideal for cultivating crops such as plantains, cotton, cholam, thinai, and coir goods. The village's farmers are known for their traditional farming practices and produce high-quality agricultural products.

Thirumalaipatty comprises several smaller areas,

- Erulapatti
- Erulapattipudhur
- Edayapatty
- Kummanaickanoor
- Muthunaickanoor
- Namanaickanoor
- Palapatty
- Periyakalani
- Pudhuvellantheru
- Senguttai
- Seniyankadu
- Solaiudayampatty
- Thammanaickanoor
- Therkukottai
- Thetukadu
- Thevaipatty
- Thoppur
- Vannamparai

== How to reach ==
=== By bus ===
- From Namakkal: 14 -A, 23, 4 (Jothi)
- From Rasipuram: 7 (SST)
- From Pudhansandai: 23, 52

=== By train ===
- Kalangani (6 km)
- Namakkal (23 km)
- Salem (44 km)

=== By airport ===
- Salem Airport (63 km)
- Tiruchirapalli Airport (112 km)
- Coimbatore Airport (161 km)

== Public facilities ==
- Nursery and Higher Secondary Schools
- Public Health Center (government hospital)
- Government Veterinary hospital
- Sub-Post Office
- Branch Library
- Indian Overseas Bank
- Salem Co-Operative Bank
- Tamil Nadu Electricity Board
- Co-Operative Agriculture Bank

== Places of worship ==
=== Temples ===
==== Nainamalai Temple ====
Thirumalaipatti is home to several places of worship, including Nainamalai Temple. The easiest way to reach the temple is from Thirumalaipatty. The temple, located on the top of a hill, is dedicated to Varadaraja and is believed to have been built by Poligar Ramachandra Nayaka. It holds a special place in the hearts of the people in the district, who visit it in large numbers on Saturdays in Purattasi (September-October).

Legend has it that the hill on which the temple is situated is the abode of Sage Kanvar, the foster father of Sakuntala, the heroine of the well-known drama "Sakuntala or the Lost Ring." However, several villages in the ceded districts of Andhra Pradesh also claim this honor.
