= Paramathi =

Paramathi Paramathy
- Panchayat town
- Location in Tamil Nadu, India
- Coordinates: 11.1667°N 78.0333°E
- Country: India
- State: Tamil Nadu
- District: Namakkal

Area
  - Total: 15.56 km^{2} (6.01 sq mi)

Population (2011)
  - Total: 11,986
  - Density: 770.3/km^{2} (1,995/sq mi)

Languages
  - Official: Tamil
- Time zone: UTC+5:30 (IST)
- Vehicle registration: TN-88

Paramathi, also spelled as Paramathy, is a panchayat town in Paramathi-Velur taluk of Namakkal district in the Indian state of Tamil Nadu. Spread across an area of 15.56 km^{2} (6.01 sq mi), the town panchayat is divided into 15 wards. It had a population of 11,986 as per the 2011 census.

== Geography and administration ==
Paramathi is a town panchayat in Paramathi-Velur taluk of Namakkal district in the Indian state of Tamil Nadu. It is located 22 km (14 mi) from Namakkal, along the road connecting Tiruchengode and Paramathi-Velur. The town panchayat covers an area of 15.56 km^{2} (6.01 sq mi) and is divided into 15 wards and 41 streets. It forms part of the Paramathi block consisting of 23 villages. The panchayat administration is responsible for providing basic services including maintenance of roads, water supply, health and sanitation. Paramathi forms part of the Paramathi-Velur Assembly constituency of the Tamil Nadu Legislative Assembly and the Namakkal Lok Sabha constituency.

== Demographics ==
According to the 2011 census, Paramathi had a population of 11,986 across 3,353 households. The population consisted of 6,022 males and 5,964 females. About 1,001 (8.35%) of the population were children aged less than six years. The town panchayat had a literacy rate of approximately 82.3%. Scheduled Castes accounted for approximately 18.9% while Schedule Tribes formed 0.2% of the population.

As per the 2011 census, Hinduism was the predominant religion, practiced by 89.6% of the population, followed by Islam (7.6%) and Christianity (2.8%). The town panchayat has a temple dedicated to Angalaman in ward number 13, which conducts an annual festival in January.

== Economy ==
Agriculture is practiced in the region with irrigation from the Kaveri river. The area contains red loamy soils. Millets, sugercane, and oil seeds are the major crops, and others include rice, cotton, and pulses. Sericulture is also practiced with the revenue block producing 16,860 kg (37,170 lb) of silk cocoons in 2014-15. According to a 2017 report by the Tamil Nadu Pollution Control Board, Paramathy block is classified as "semi-critical" in terms of ground water availability as 70% to 90% of the groundwater had been utilized. Other industries include production of coir, and textile yarn.

== Transport ==
Bus services plying between Karur and Salem connect the town panchayat. The nearest railway station is the Mohanur railway station located approximately 21 km (13 mi) away and the nearest airport is the Salem Airport.
