= Narasimhaswamy Temple, Namakkal =

Hindu temple in Tamil Nadu, India

Narasimhaswamy Temple
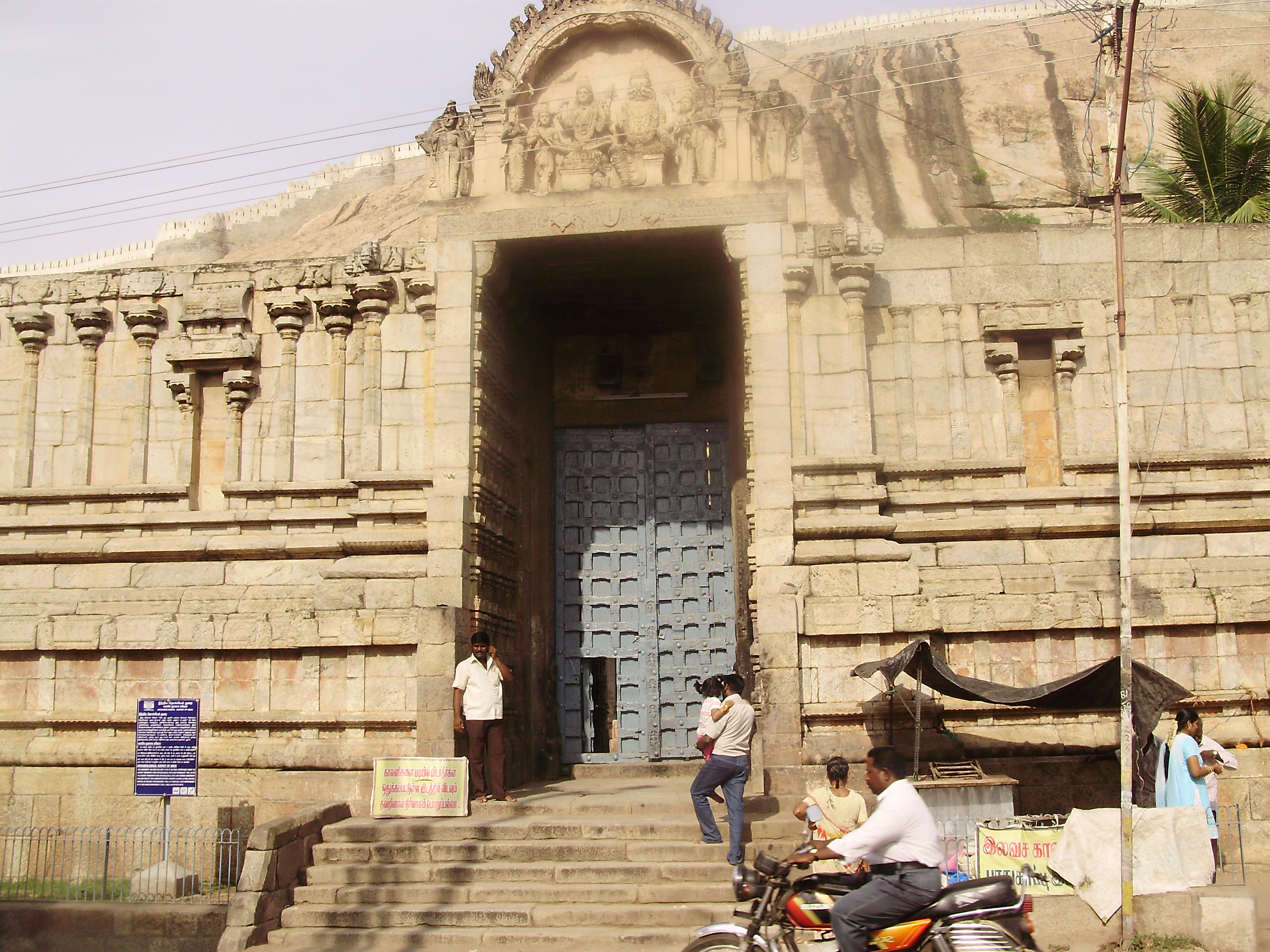
- Image of the temple entrance with Namakkal Fort in the background

- Location in Tamil Nadu

Religion
- Affiliation: Hinduism
- District: Namakkal
- Deity: Narasimhaswamy (Vishnu); Namagiri Tayar (Lakshmi)

Location
- Location: Namakkal
- State: Tamil Nadu
- Country: India
- Coordinates: 11°13′20″N 78°09′51″E

Architecture
- Type: Dravidian, rock-cut architecture

The Narasimhaswamy temple is a temple located in Namakkal, a town in the Namakkal district in the South Indian state of Tamil Nadu. It is dedicated to the Hindu god Narasimha, considered an avatar of Vishnu. The temple displays Dravidian style of architecture and Rock-cut architecture construction.

The legend of the temple is associated with Narasimha appearing here for his consort Lakshmi and Hanuman. Based on the architectural features, historians believe that the temple was built between the 6th and 8th centuries by the Adiyaman kings.

The temple is maintained and administered by the Hindu Religious and Endowment Board of the Government of Tamil Nadu.

== Legend ==
As per Hindu legend, Vishnu had assumed the avatar of Narasimha and killed the Asura king Hiranyakashyapu. Ages passed by, when Lakshmi, the consort of Vishnu, was angry and performing penance because Narasimha did not forgive Hiranyakashyapu. Hanuman was carrying a shaligrama image and requested the disguised Lakshmi to hold it until he returns. Lakshmi was not able to bear the weight of the statue and placed it at the place of the temple, which grew into a mount before Hanuman returned. Narasimha appeared before both of them and set his abode at this place in the stone statue. This the place where Lakshmi got back into the chest of Vishnu and can be seen even today in the main deity's chest. Narasimha is seen here worshipped by the deities Shiva and Brahma.

As per medieval historians, Purandarasa (1500 CE), a Kannada Haridasa, known as the Pithamaha (grandfather) of Carnatic music had visited this place and glorified the God by composing a Kannada song. In front of Namagiri Narashimhar, he composed his famous song "Simha Rupanada Sri Hari, Namagirishane".

== History ==
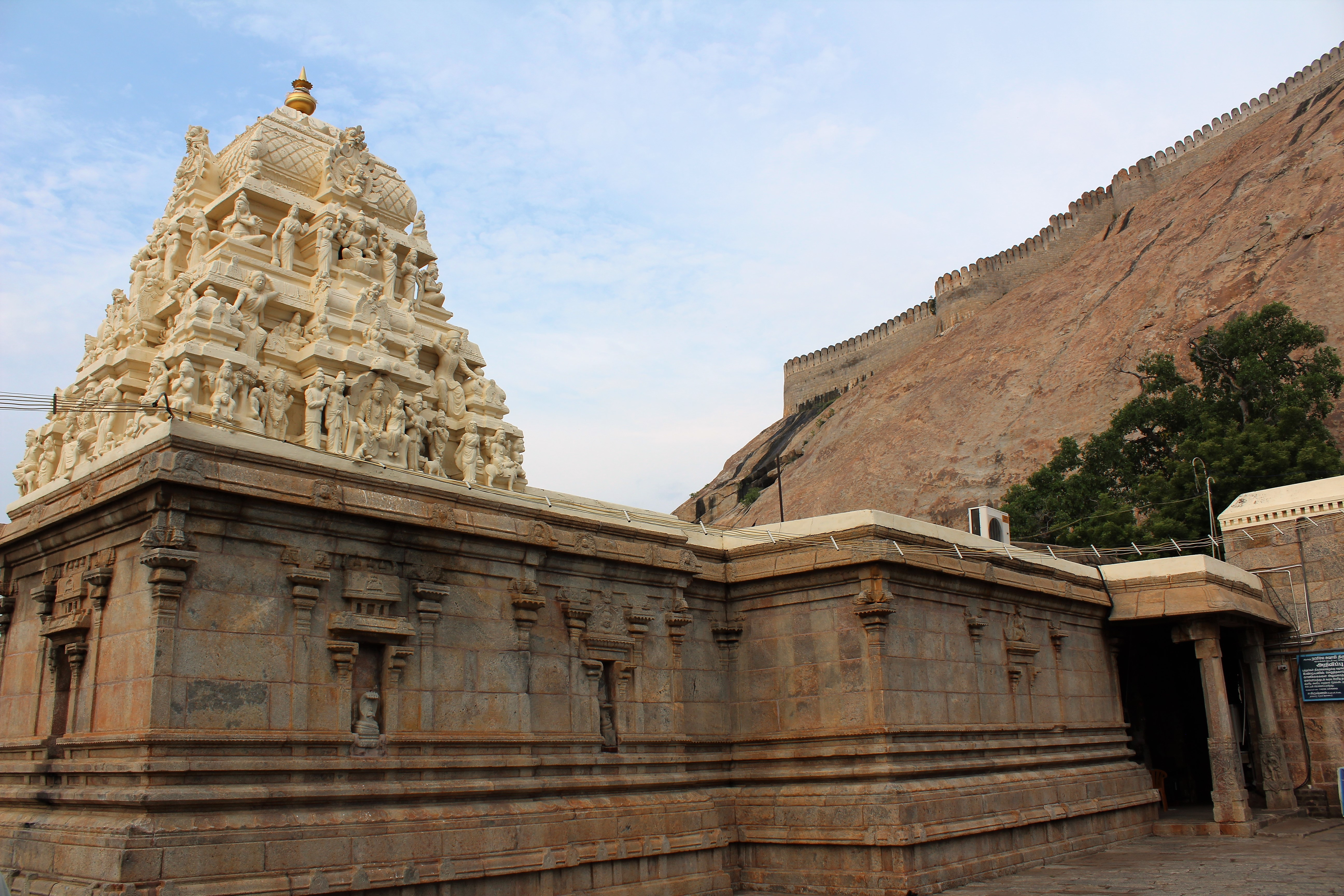
View of Namagiri Thayar Vimanam

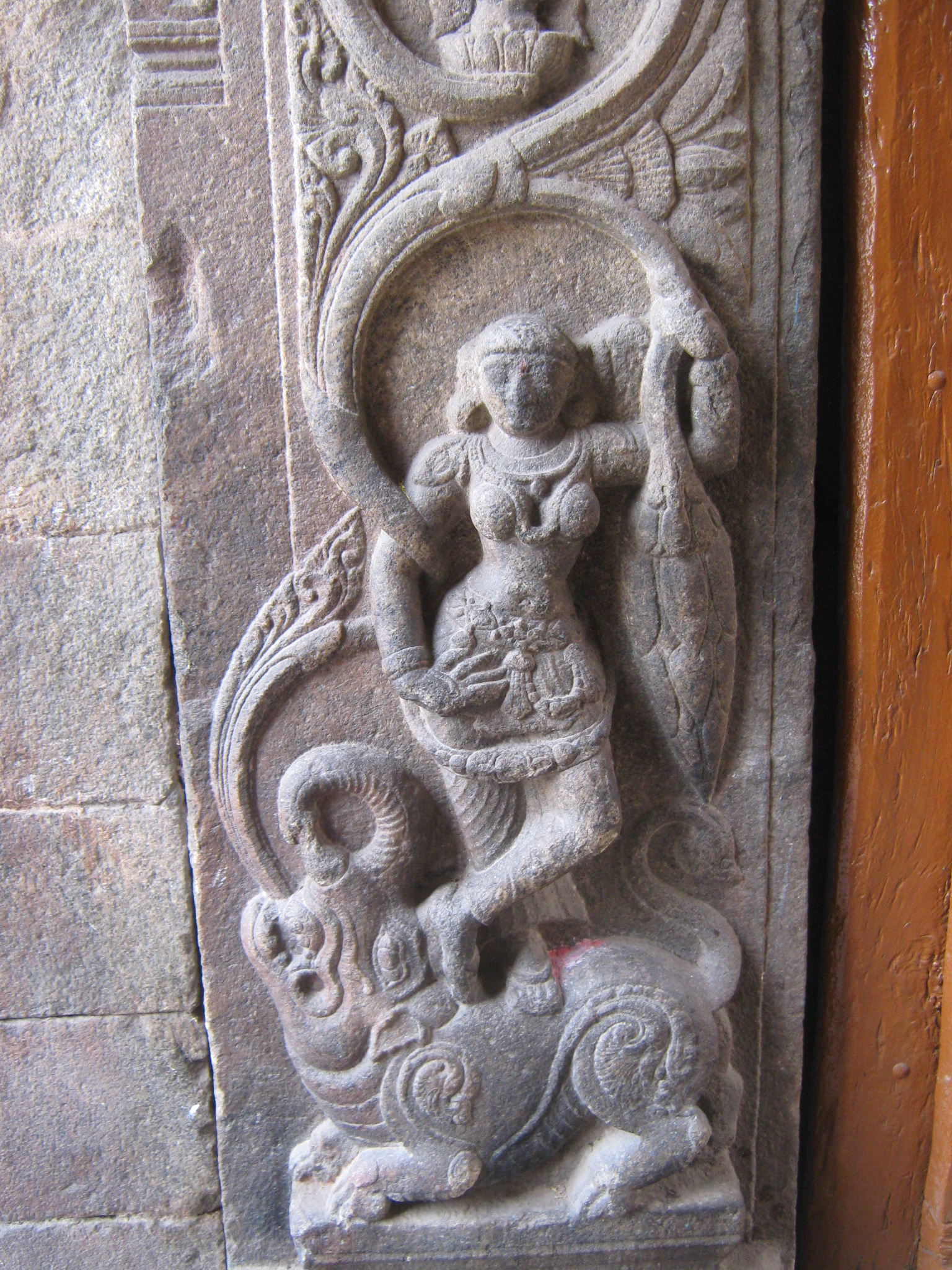
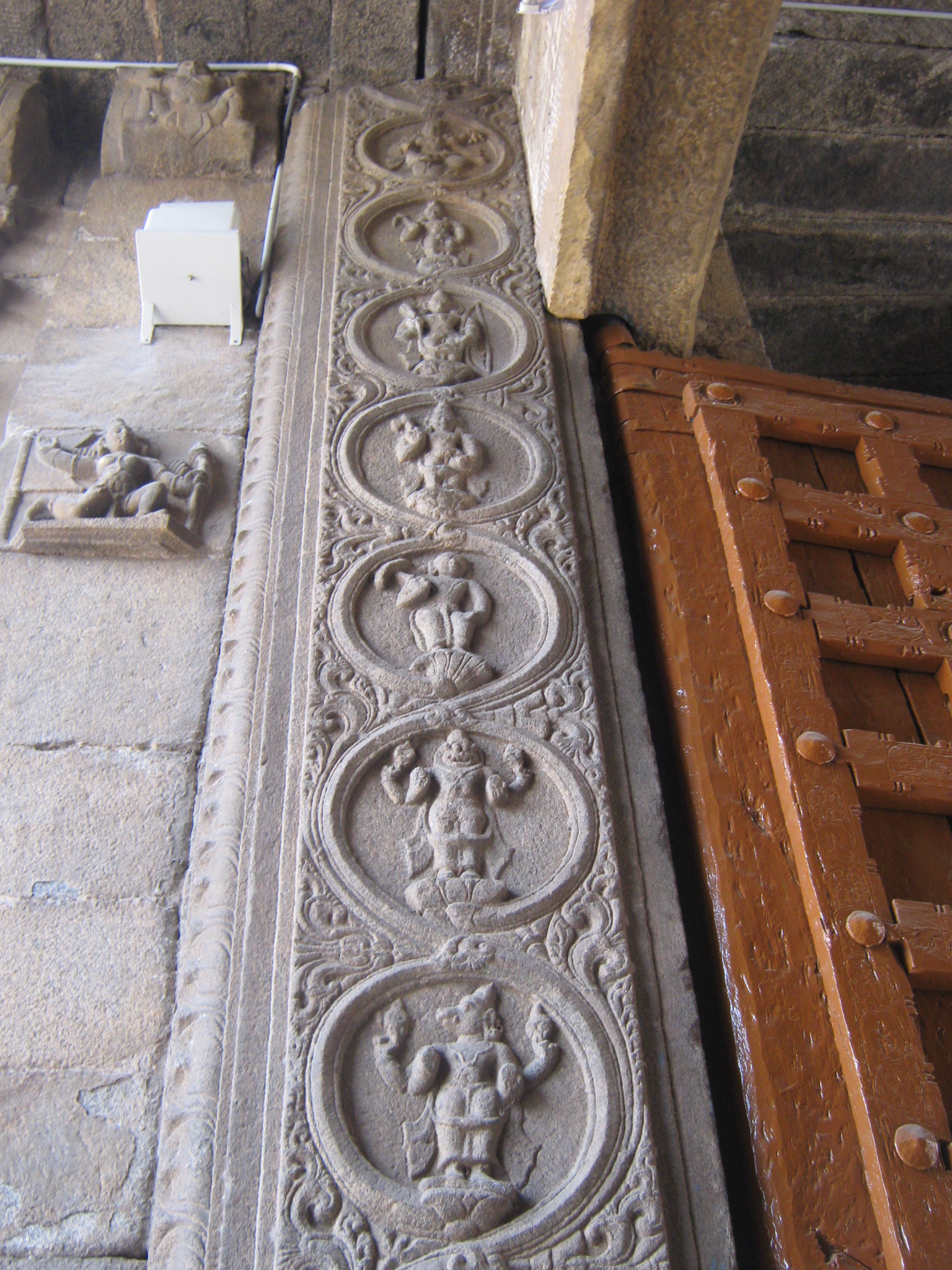
Sculptural niches on the walls

The temple is believed to be built during the 6th century CE by the Pandya or Satyaputra kings in rock-cut architecture. The inscriptions found in the Ranganatha temple are believed to be excavated in the same Namakkal hill. Historian Soundara Rajan places the date to a pre-Varagunan I (800–830 CE) era in the 8th century. Based on the paleography and rock-cut architecture, P. R. Srinivasan has placed it at 6th century.

Most historians have compared the temples with similar architectural elements found in Badami Caves (6th century) and a possible influence. There are a few inscriptions in the temple, especially an undated inscription in Grantha Characters of Sanskrit at the Ranganatha temple which are similar to the inscriptions in the Ganesha Ratha in Mahabalipuram, which is in another cave in the upper part of the hill.

Some historians have argued that the Alvars during the Bhakti tradition have discarded Rock-cut images and hence no mention is found in the Nalayira Divya Prabandham about this temple. But the argument is disproved by other historians who have quoted rock-cut temples like Thirumeyyam in Pudukottai district and Ninra Narayana Perumal temple in Virudhunagar district finding mention in the canon. The records of the details of the inscriptions are found in the Annual report of Epigraphy -1961.

== Location ==
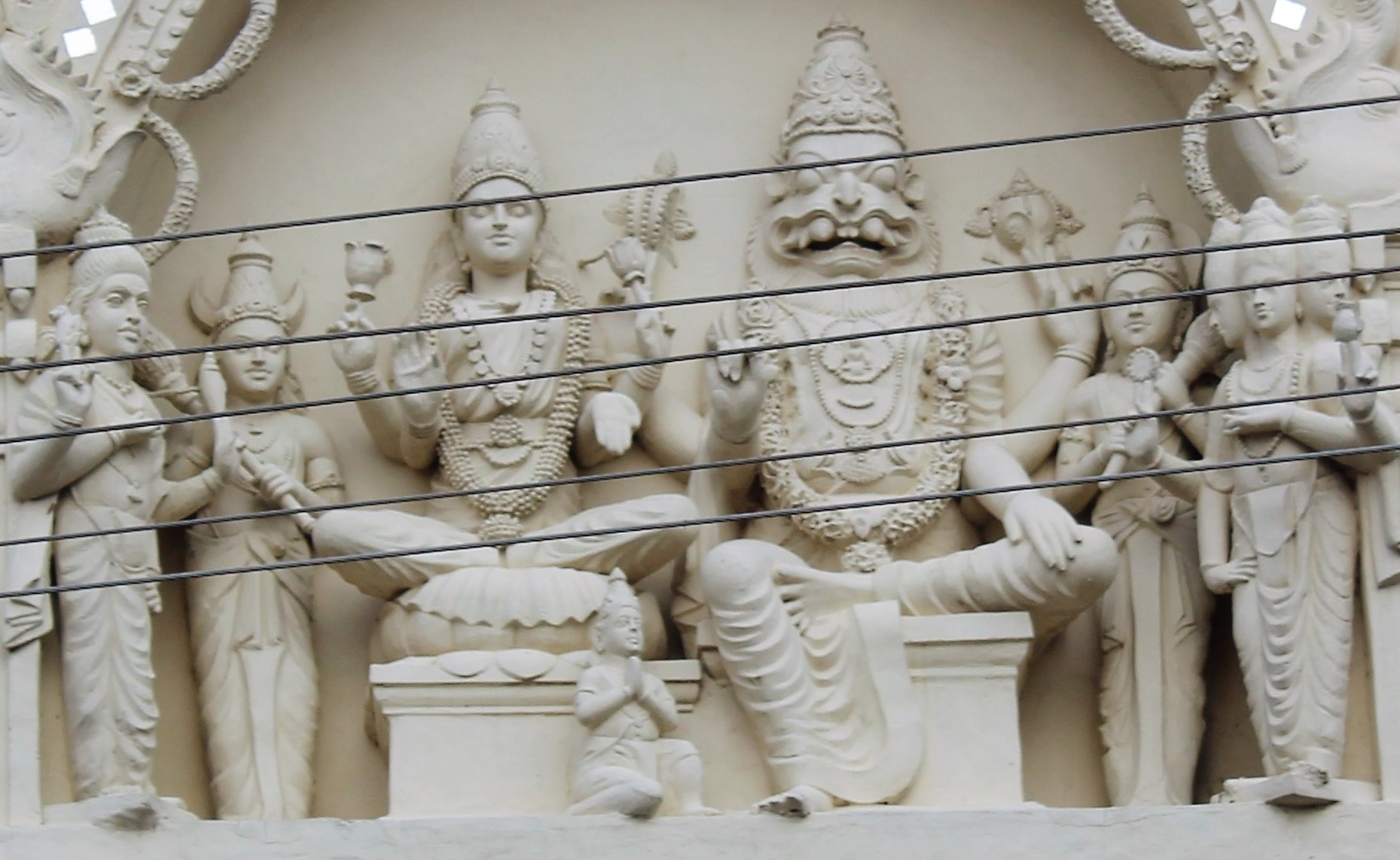
Replica of the Main Deity Worshiped by Shiva (left) and Brahma (right)

The temple is located along Namakkal-Salem road in Namakkal town, Namakkal district in Tamil Nadu. The temple, carved out of a hill, is located in the downhill of the Namakkal Fort, on the western flank of the hill. The temple has a flat gateway tower and a second entrance, also with a flat gateway leading to the pillared halls.

The main sanctum sanctorum houses the image of Narasimha in sitting posture, called Asanamurthi with Sanaka, Sanata, Surya, Chandra, Shiva, and Brahma worshipping him. He is sported with two hands holding the conch and the Chakra. The sanctum is rock-cut and square in shape with a black background. The sanctum has three sculpted cells, two pillars, and a verandah in front of it.

There is a panel depicting the narrative of Vamana, who takes water from the Asura King Mahabali and later grows as Trivikrama to crush Mahabali under his feet as per the Skanda Purana. Historians consider this as a deviation from the monoscenic sculptures in temples of Kanchipuram and Mahabalipuram.

The temple has other sculptural relief on the walls of the temple depicting Trivikrama, Narasimha slaying Hiranyakashipu and Ananta Sayana Vishnu. The temple tank, Kamalalayam, is located outside the temple. There are similar rock-cut images in the temple halfway up the Namakkal Fort. Dr. S Vasanthi states that the sculpture of "Ugra Narasimha" in the cave was unknown even to the Pallavas and Chalukyas and is a very rare sculpture among the other sculptures in the Cave.

== Influence on people ==
=== Sri Purandaradasa ===
Sri Purandarasa (1500 CE), a Kannada Hari dasa, known as "Pithamaha of Carnatic music" and is considered as incarnation of Narada. He had visited this temple and composed a Kannada song, seeing the beauty of the deities, title "Simha Rupanada Sri Hari, Namagirishane".

=== Srinivasa Ramanujan ===
The great Indian mathematician Srinivasa Ramanujan credited his mathematical findings to goddess Namagiri Mahalakshmi, his family deity or Kuldevi. According to Ramanujan, She appeared to him in visions, proposing mathematical formulas that he would then have to verify. One such event was described by him as follows:

"While asleep, I had an unusual experience. There was a red screen formed by flowing blood, as it were. I was observing it. Suddenly a hand began to write on the screen. I became all attention. That hand wrote a number of elliptic integrals. They stuck to my mind. As soon as I woke up, I committed them to writing."

— Ramanujan

Furthermore, Ramanujan's mother sought permission from the goddess for Ramanujan to go to England in a dream.

== Festival and importance ==
The major festivals of the temple is the fifteen-day Panguni Uthiram festival, celebrated during the Tamil month of Panguni (March–April) when the image of presiding deities are taken around the streets of the temple in a temple chariot. The sacred marriage of the presiding deity is also performed during the function.

In modern times, the Namakkal district administration has identified the temple as one of the prominent tourist attractions in the district. The temple is maintained by Archaeological Survey of India of the Government of India and is administered by the Hindu Religious and Charitable Endowment department of the Government of Tamil Nadu.

== Photo gallery ==
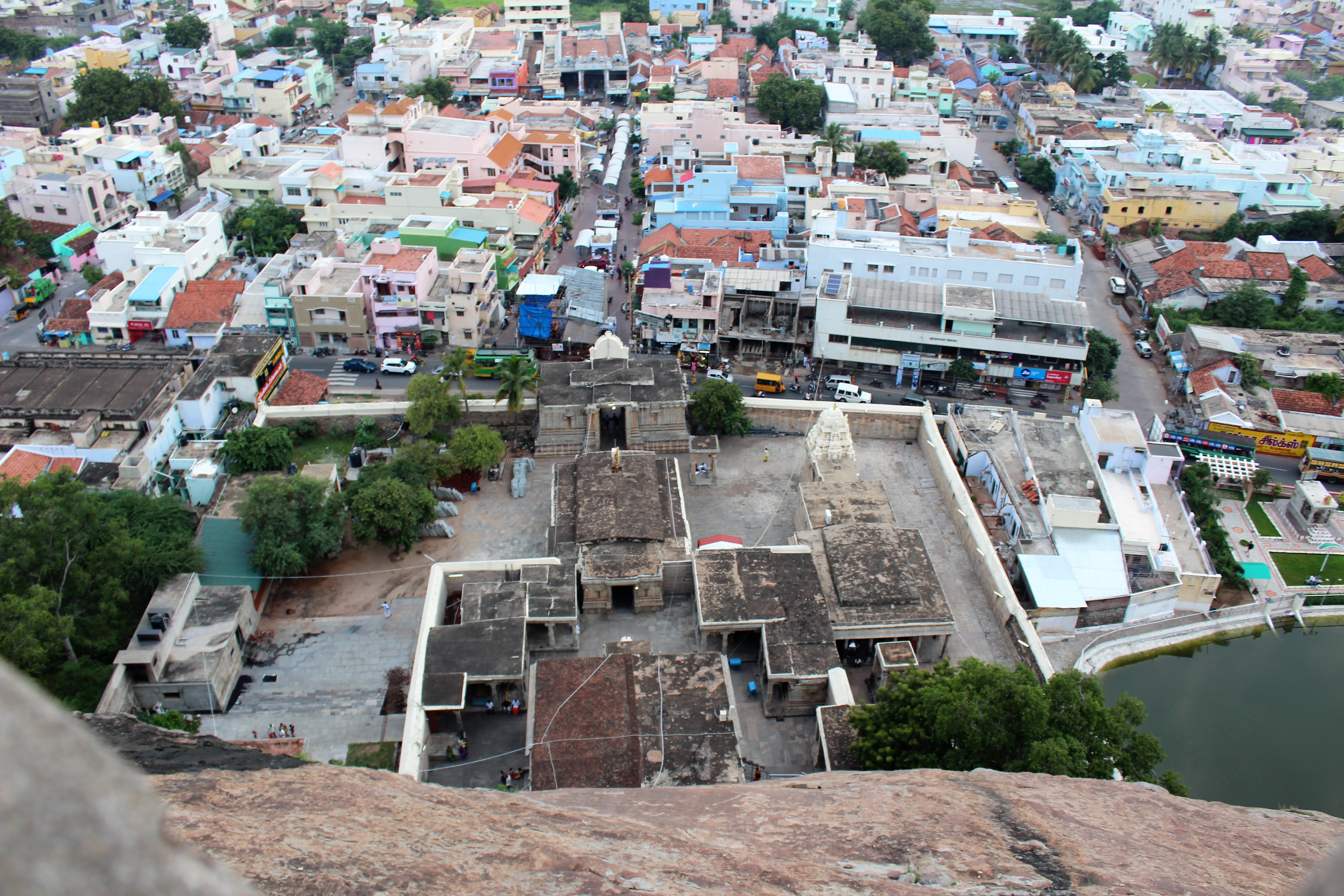
Aerial view of the temple and Anjaneyar facing the temple

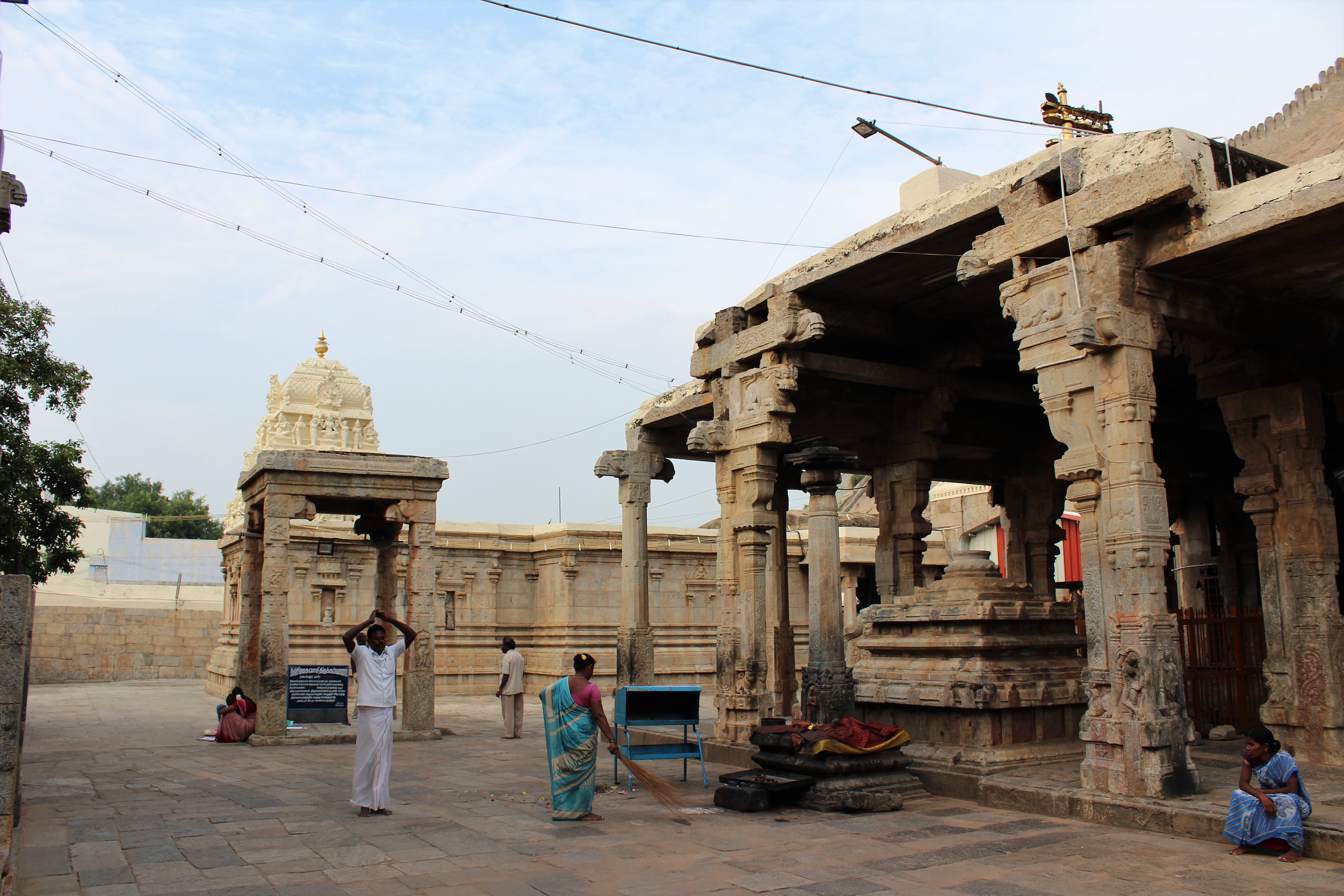
View of the Mandapam and Kodi Marram in the temple

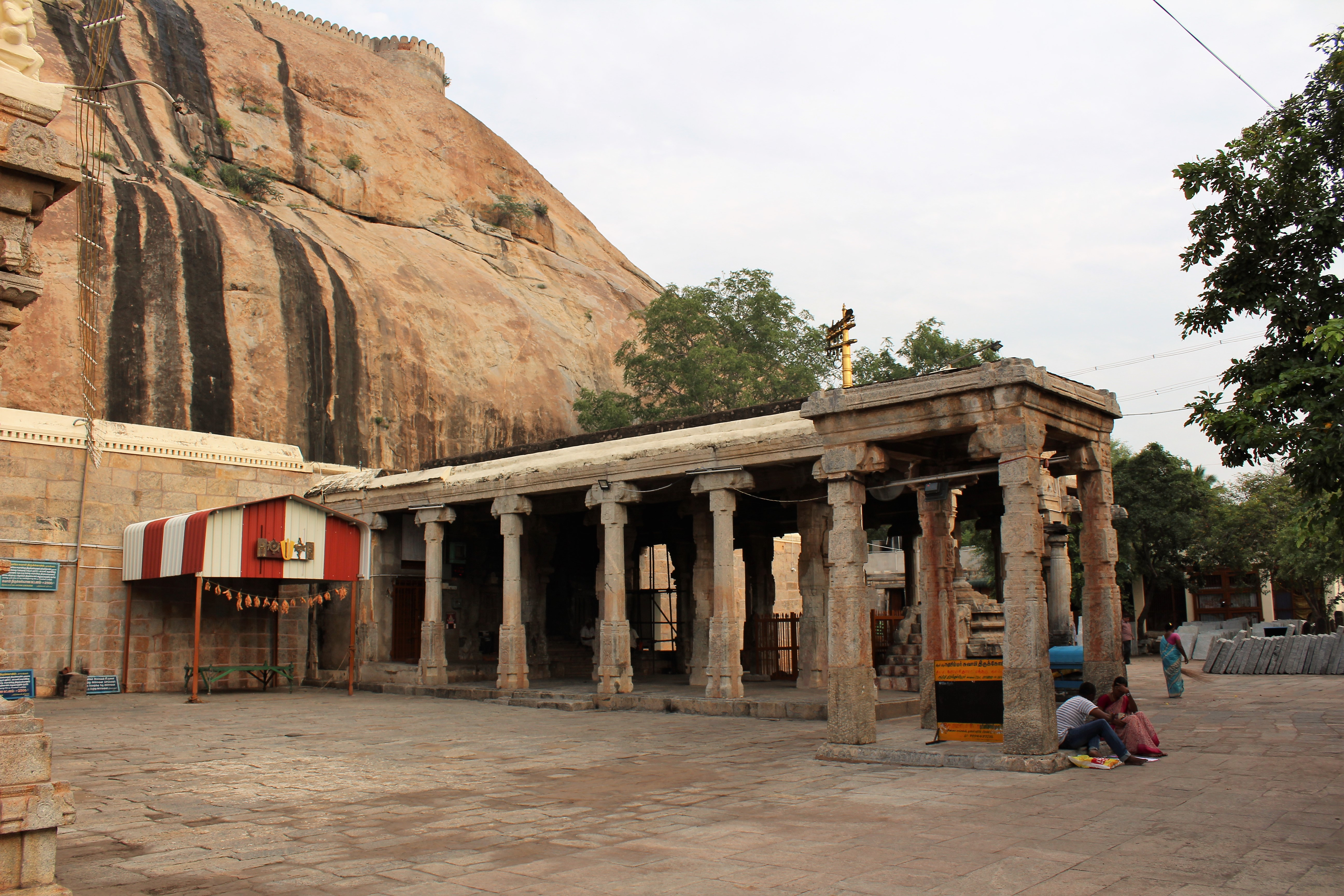
Sculpted pillared halls leading to the cave sanctum

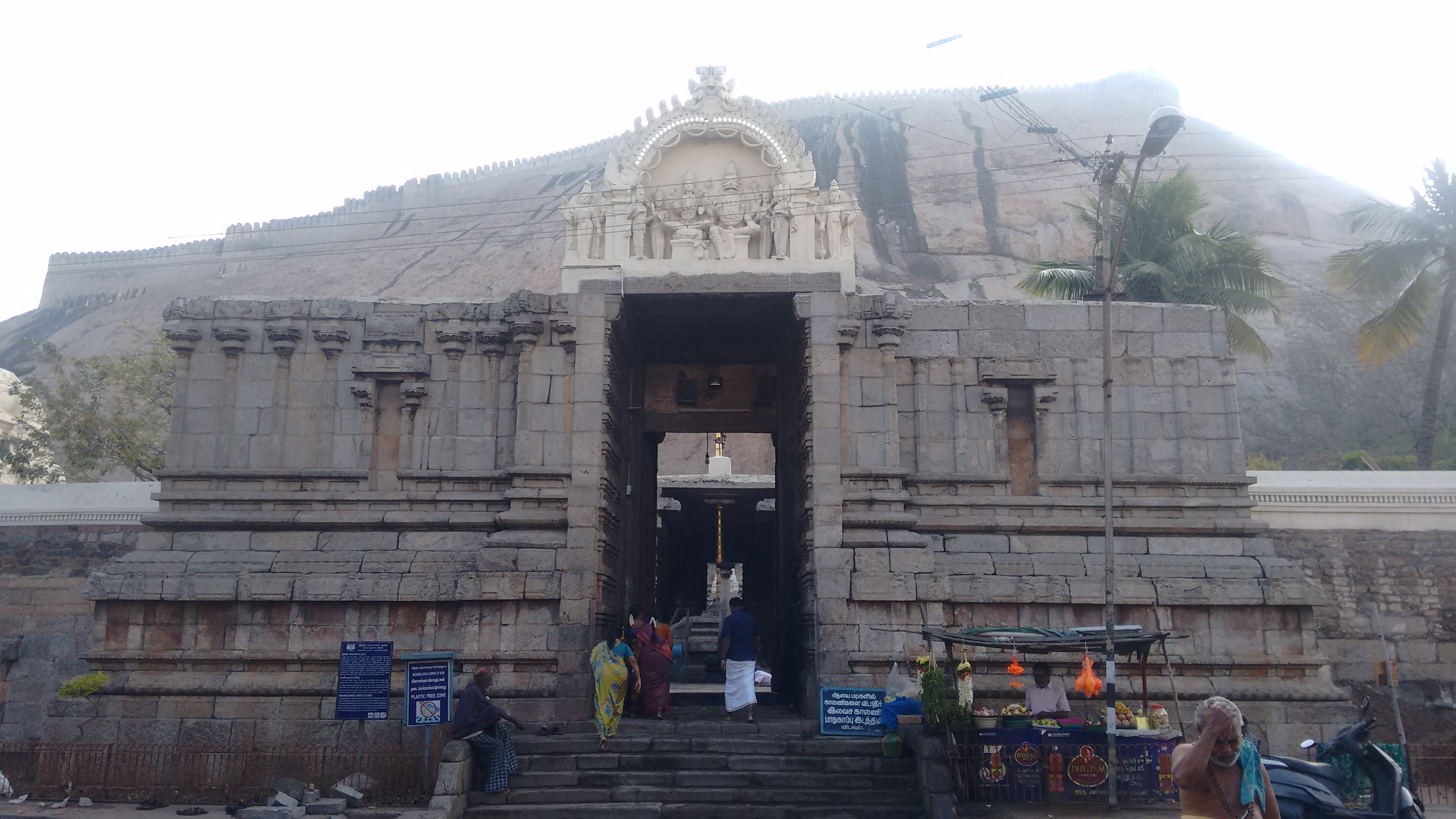

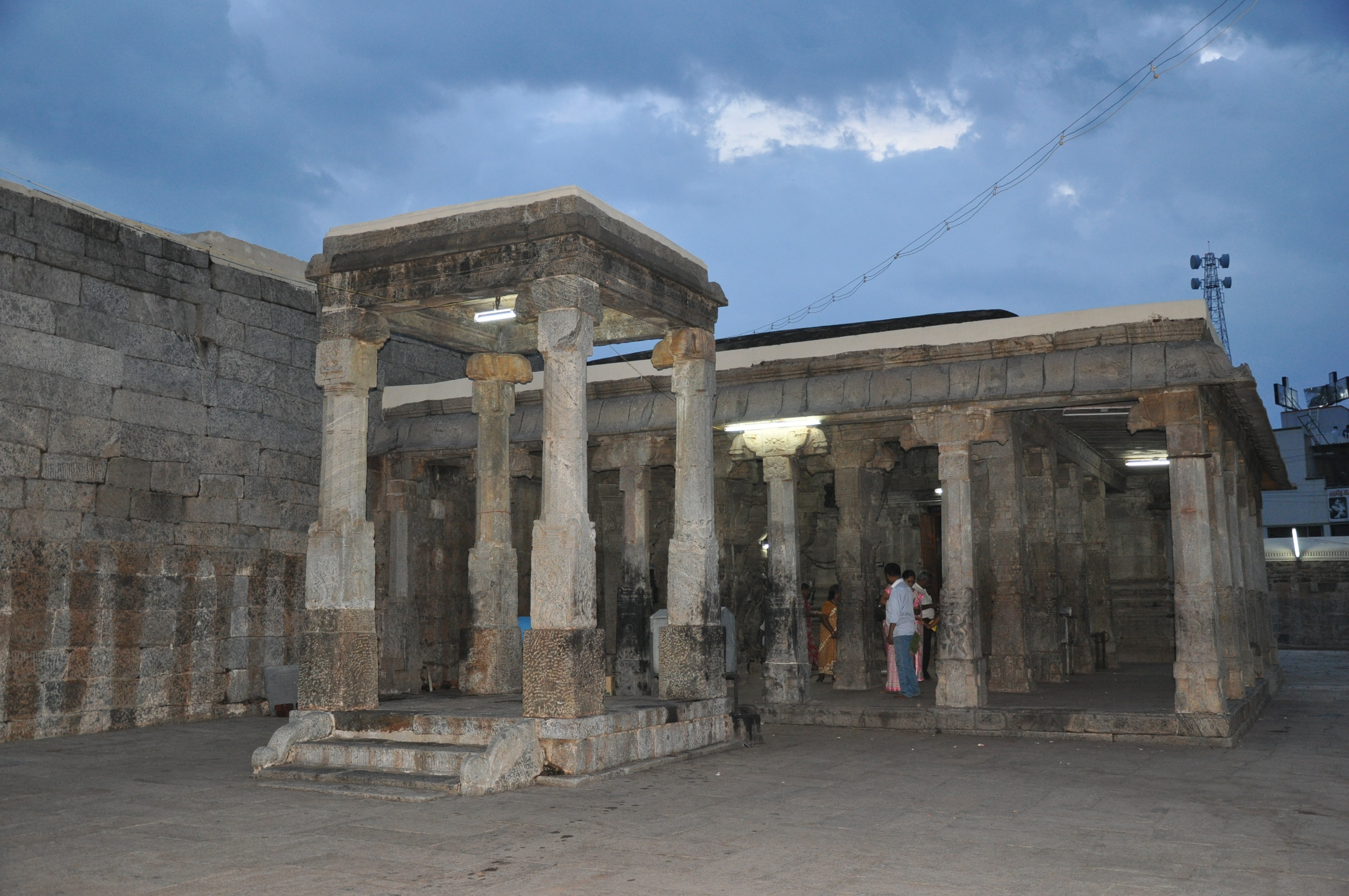

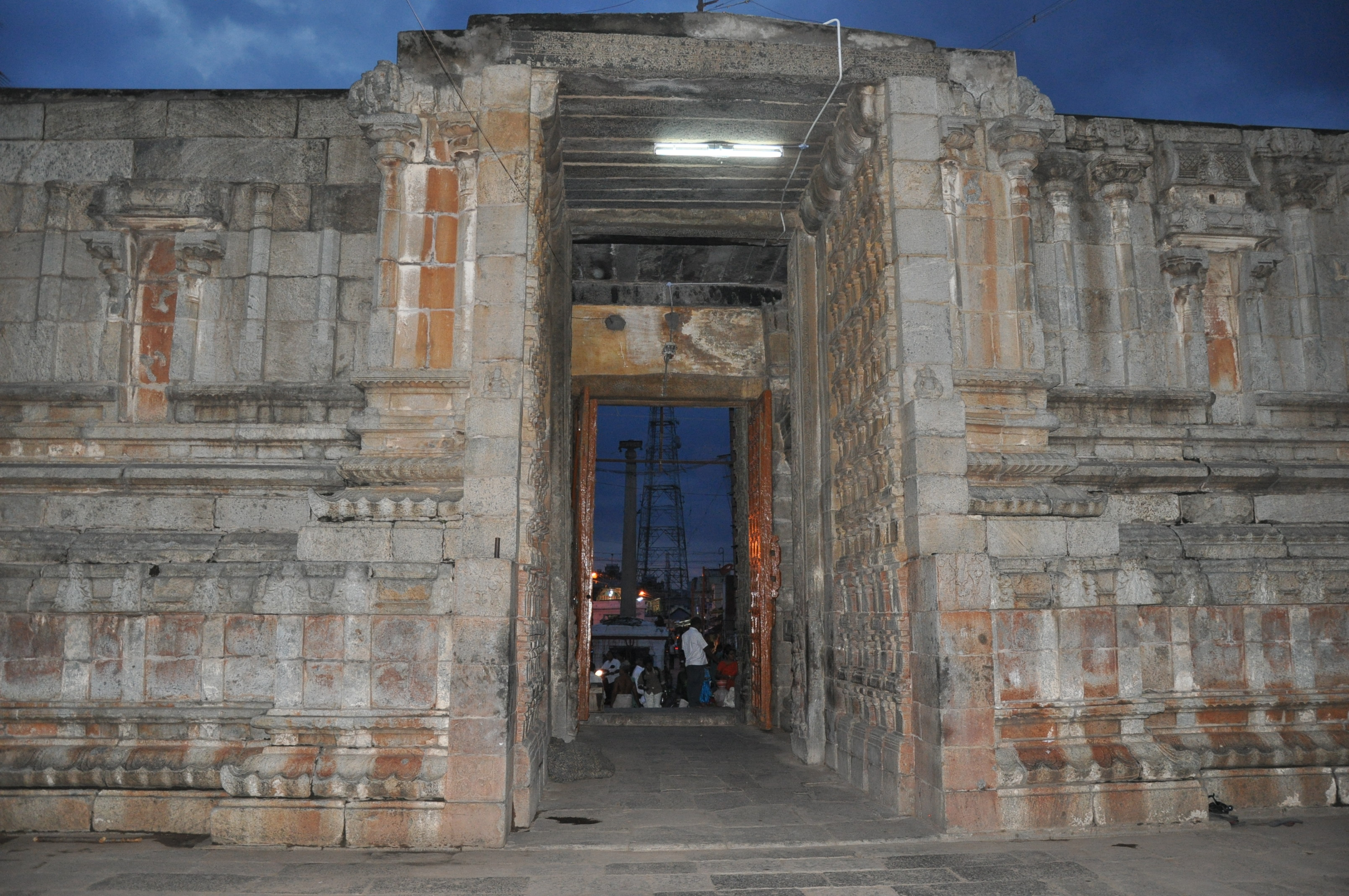

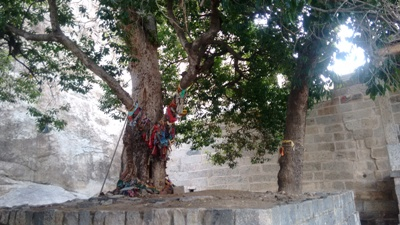

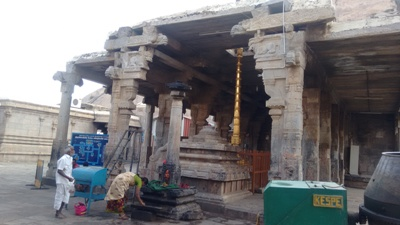

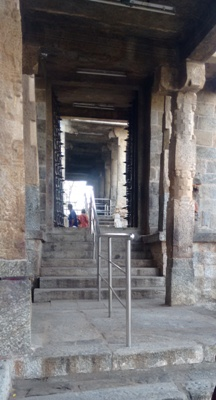

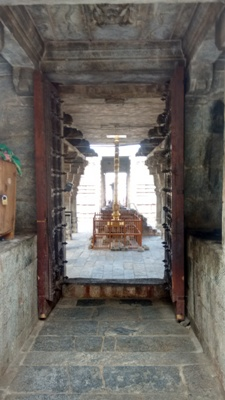
