= Namagiri =

Namagiri may refer to:

- Namakkal, municipality in Tamil Nadu, India and its namesake, a large rock
- Namagiri Thayar, Hindu Goddess, form of Lakshmi
- Namagiripettai block, a revenue block in the Namakkal district of Tamil Nadu, India.
- Namagiripettai Krishnan (1924 – 2001), a Carnatic musician born in Namagiripettai
