= Vettambadi =

- village
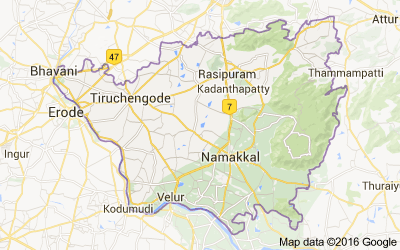
- Country: India
- State: Tamil Nadu
- District: Namakkal

Languages
  - Official: Tamil
- Time zone: UTC+5:30 (IST)
- Coastline: 0 kilometres (0 mi)
- Nearest city: Namakkal

Vettambadi is a neighborhood of Namakkal situated east of Namakkal and west of Sendamangalam.

Vettambadi is located on the Namakkal-Sendamangalam Highway, 5 km from Namakkal. The people in the village are mostly involved in agriculture and in the lorry (truck) business. There is a Mariyamman temple located in the Village. The festival is celebrated once in a year.it was celebrated for one week.
