= Paramathi block =

Paramathi block is a revenue block in the Namakkal district of Tamil Nadu, India. The headquarter of the block is in Paramathi town. It has a total of 20 panchayat villages.
