= Namakkal Anjaneyar Temple =

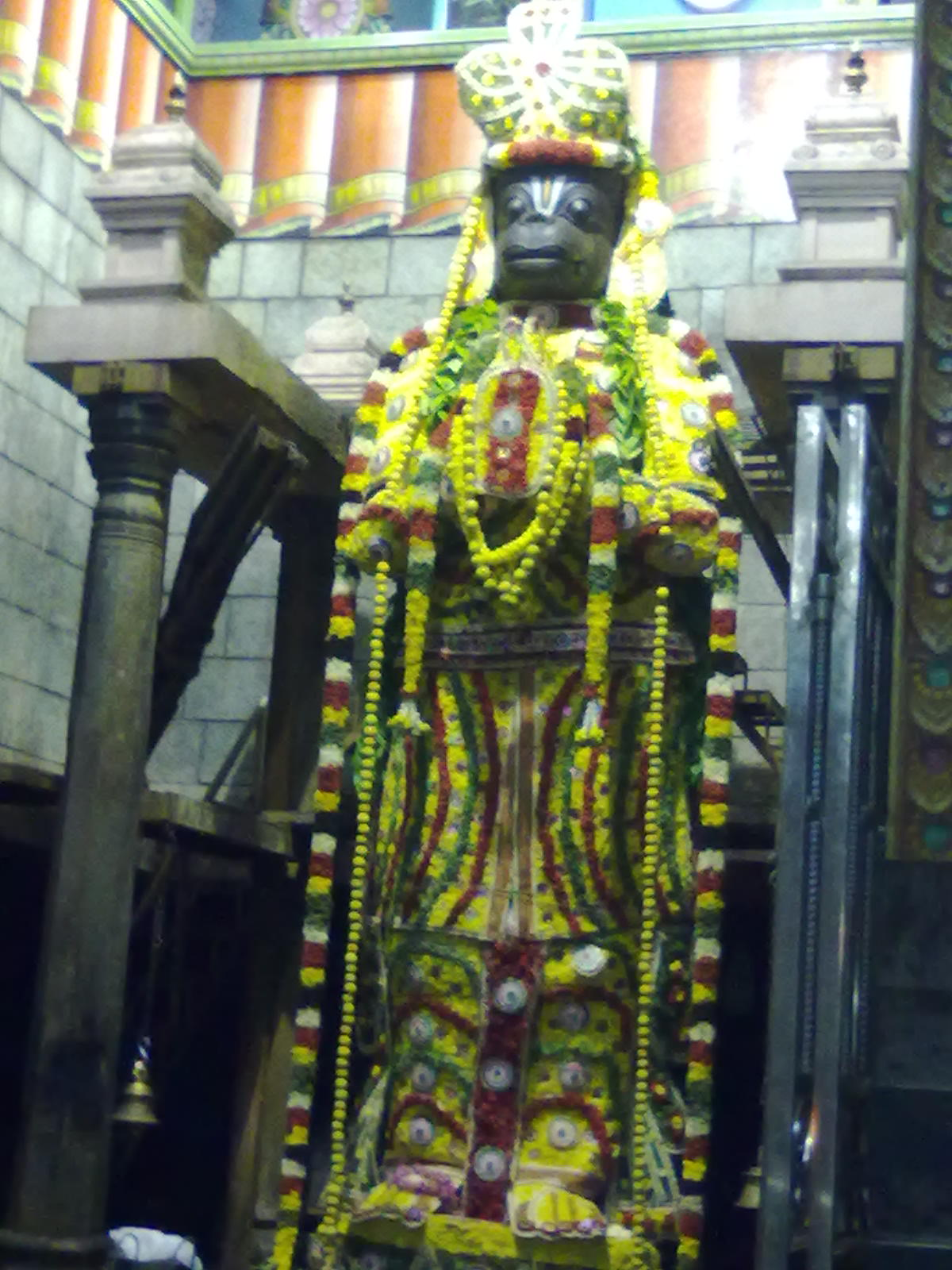
- Image of Hanuman in standing posture

- Location in Tamil Nadu

Religion
- Affiliation: Hinduism
- District: Namakkal
- Deity: Anjaneyar(Hanuman)

Location
- Location: Namakkal
- State: Tamil Nadu
- Country: India
- Interactive map of Namakkal Anjaneyar Temple
- Coordinates: 11°13′20″N 78°09′45″E

Architecture
- Type: Tamil architecture

Namakkal Anjaneyar temple is located in Namakkal, a town in Namakkal district in Tamil Nadu, India and is dedicated to the Hindu god Hanuman. It is constructed in the Tamil style of architecture. The legend of the temple is associated with Narasimha, an avatar of Hindu god Vishnu appearing for Hanuman and Lakshmi. The image of Anjaneyar is 18 ft (5.5 m) tall, making it one of the tallest images of Hanuman in India. The temple follows the Vaikhanasa tradition.

The temple has a pillared hall leading to the sanctum. Four daily rituals and many yearly festivals are held at the temple, of which fifteen-day Panguni Uthiram festival celebrated during the Tamil month of Panguni (March - April) when the image of presiding deities are taken around the streets of the temple, being the most prominent. The temple is maintained and administered by the Hindu Religious and Charitable Endowments Department of the Government of Tamil Nadu.

== Legend ==
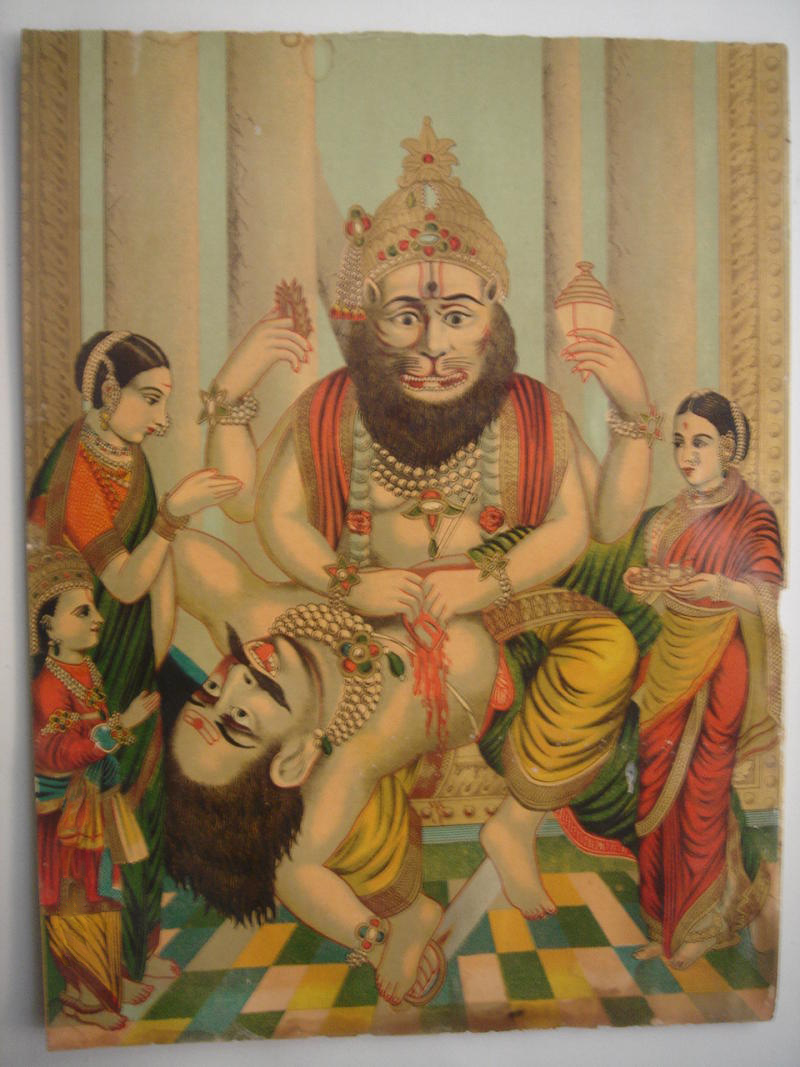
Narasimha slaying Hiranyakasipu as Prahlada prays

Hiranyakasipu was troubling the Devas as he got a boon from Brahma that no human can kill him, neither could he be killed in morning, noon or night nor in air, water or ground. His son Prahlada was an ardent devotee of Vishnu against the wishes of his father. He also tried to slay Prahalada at various times, just to be saved by the divine grace of Vishnu. During a heated argument with Prahalada, Hiranyakasipu was asking if Vishnu is present everywhere and went on to break a pillar with his weapon. Vishnu took the avatar of Narasimha and appeared from the pillar. Narasimha was a human with lion face and slayed Hiranyakasipu on an evening time in a doorway, which was neither land nor air.

Ages past by, when Lakshmi, the consort of Vishnu was doing penance at this place. Hanuman (locally called Anjaneyar) was carrying an image made of Saligrama and Lakshmi requested him to get her a view of Vishnu in the form of Narasimha. Hanuman entrusted the saligrama to her and asked her to hold it until he returns. Lakshmi placed the image at this place, which grew into a mount before Hanuman could return. Narasimha appeared before both of them and set his abode at this place. The Narasimhaswamy temple, located right at the foot hills is also associated with this legend and Hanuman is believed to have worshipped him in standing posture form a distance axial to the temple.

== Architecture ==
The temple is located in Namakkal, in the downhill of the Namakkal hill in Namakkal district in Tamil Nadu on the road from Namakkal to Salem. The temple has a flat gateway tower with a pillared hall leading to the sanctum. The sanctum houses the image of 18 ft (5.5 m) Anjaneyar axially facing the Narasimha shrine in the foothills, located 130 m (430 ft) away. The image of Anjaneyar is carved out of a single stone and believed to be existing from the 5th century. There is no roof over the sanctum and Anjaneyar has a unique iconography sporting a sword in his waist and holding a garland made of Saligram. The temple is considered one of the prominent temples in the Tamil Nadu state and the country. The temple is maintained and administered by the Hindu Religious and Endowment Board of the Government of Tamil Nadu.

== Festival and religious practises ==
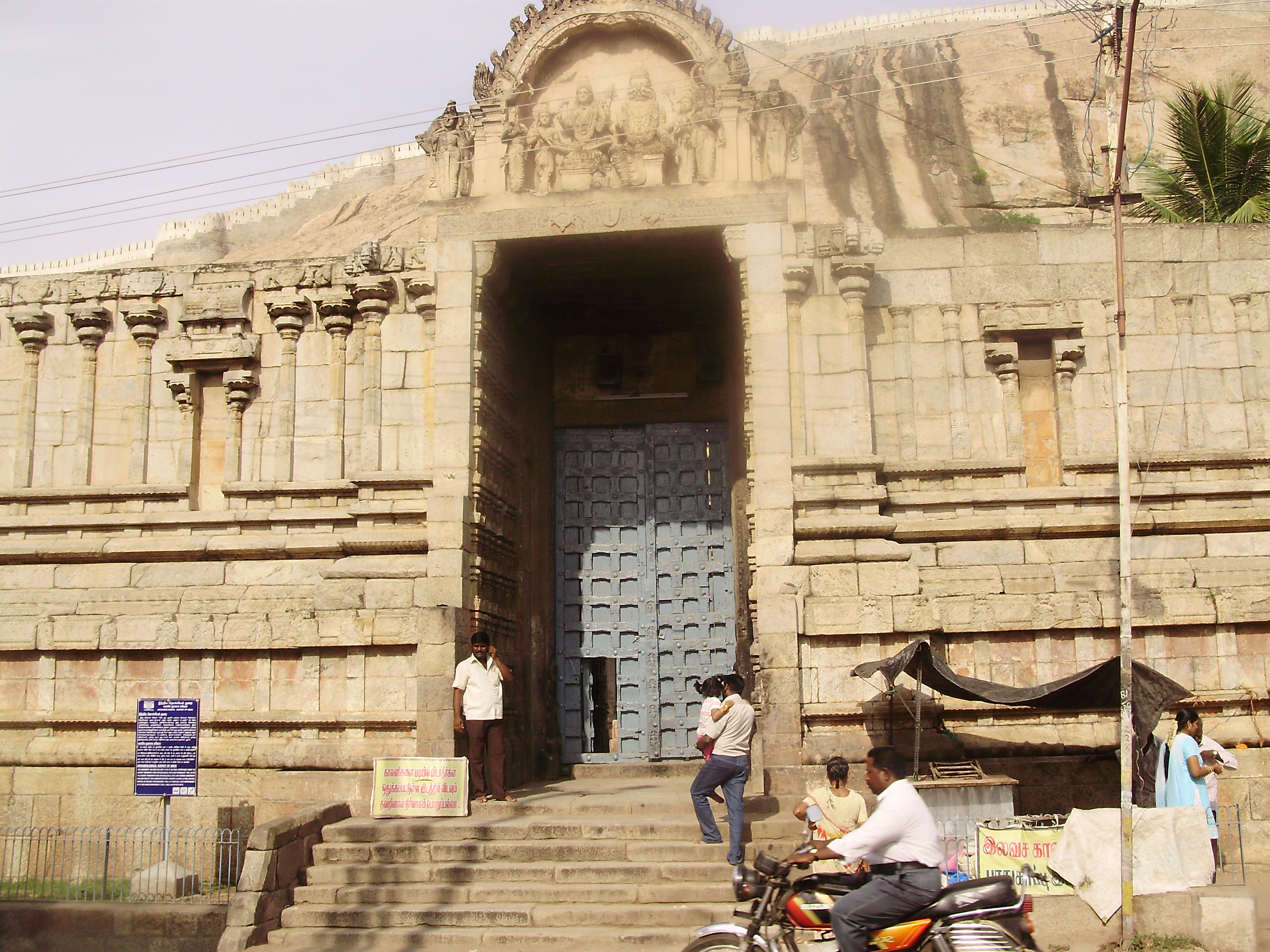
The Narasimhaswamy temple in the fort facing the Anjaneyar temple

The temple priests perform the pooja (rituals) during festivals and on a daily basis. The temple rituals are performed four times a day: Kalasandhi at 8:00 a.m., Uchikala pooja at 12:00 p.m., Sayaraksha at 6:00 p.m., and Ardhajama Pooja at 8:45 p.m. Each ritual has three steps: alankaram (decoration), naivedyam (food offering) and deepa aradhanam (waving of lamps) for the presiding deities. There are weekly, monthly and fortnightly rituals performed in the temple. The temple is open from 6:30 a.m. – 1:00 p.m. and 4:30 - 9:00 p.m. on all days except during festive occasions when it has extended timings. The major festival of the temple is the fifteen-day Panguni Uthiram festival celebrated during the Tamil month of Panguni (March - April) when the image of presiding deities are taken around the streets of the temple. In modern times, the Namakkal district administration has identified the temple as one of the prominent tourist attractions in the district. The temple is frequented by people in and around Namakkal. The temple is maintained and administered by the Hindu Religious and Endowment Board of the Government of Tamil Nadu.
