= Vagurampatty =

Village in Namakkal district of Tamil Nadu, India

Coordinates: 11.1824°N 78.1787°E

Vagurampatty is a neighbourhood of the city of Namakkal in Tamil Nadu, India. It is situated in the heart of the city.
