= Puduchatram railway station =

Railway station in Tamil Nadu, India

Puduchatram

General information
- Location: Puduchatram, Tamil Nadu, India
- Coordinates: 11°23′09.1″N 78°11′0.84″E
- Elevation: 204 metres (669 ft)
- System: Indian Railways station
- Owner: Indian Railways
- Line: Salem Junction–Karur Junction line
- Platforms: 1
- Tracks: 1

Construction
- Structure type: On-ground

Other information
- Status: Closed
- Station code: PCTM
- Zone(s): Southern Railway zone
- Division(s): Salem
- Fare zone: Southern Railway zone

History
- Opened: 2013
- Closed: 2018
Route map
Location
- Location within India Location within Tamil Nadu

Puduchatram railway station (Code: PCTM) is a railway station situated in Puduchatram, Namakkal district in the Indian state of Tamil Nadu. The station is an intermediate station on the newly commissioned Salem Junction–Karur Junction line which became operational in May 2013. The station is operated by the Southern Railway zone of the Indian Railways and comes under the Salem railway division.
