= Laddivadi railway station =

Railway station in Tamil Nadu, India

Laddivadi

General information
- Location: Laddivadi, Tamil Nadu, India
- Coordinates: 11°10′16.1″N 78°10′09.4″E
- Elevation: 191 metres (627 ft)
- System: Indian Railways station
- Owner: Indian Railways
- Line: Salem Junction–Karur Junction line
- Platforms: 1
- Tracks: 1

Construction
- Structure type: On-ground

Other information
- Station code: LDVD
- Zone(s): Southern Railway zone
- Division(s): Salem
- Fare zone: Southern Railway zone

History
- Opened: May 2013 (13 years ago)
Route map
Location
- Location within India Location within Tamil Nadu

Laddivadi railway station (Code: LDVD) is a railway station situated in Laddivadi, Namakkal district in the Indian state of Tamil Nadu. The station is an intermediate station on the newly commissioned Salem Junction–Karur Junction line which became operational in May 2013. The station is operated by the Southern Railway zone of the Indian Railways and comes under the Salem railway division.
