= Kalangani =

- village
- Location in Tamil Nadu, India
- Coordinates: 11°20′08″N 78°10′00″E
- Country: India
- State: Tamil Nadu
- District: Namakkal
- Taluk: Namakkal

Population (2011)
  - Total: 3,916

Languages
  - Official: Tamil
- Time zone: UTC+5:30 (IST)
- PIN: 637014

Kalangani is a village in Namakkal district, Tamil Nadu, India, located on the National Highway NH 7, 11 km before Namakkal on the Salem to Namakkal route. The population was 3,916 at the 2011 Indian census.

There is one Government higher secondary school (ADW). It is very helpful for surrounding village students. Some people are descent of Kshatriya chieftains, living around the centre areas of the Sakthi Renuka ancient temple.
