= P. R. Srinivasan =

Indian epigraphist and archaeologist

P. R. Srinivasan (born 27 June 1920) was an Indian epigraphist, archaeologist and art historian associated with the Government Museum, Chennai.

Srinivasan served as curator for art and archaeology at the Government Museum from 1946 to 1959 and director of the epigraphy branch of the Archaeological Survey of India (ASI) from 1976 to 1978. Srinivasan was known for his book Bronzes of South India (1963) which was published as a bulletin of the Government Museum and his illustration in the 1955 edition of K. A. Nilakanta Sastri's magnum opus The Cholas. Srinivasan was the Chief Epigraphist from 1976 to 1978. He edited South Indian Inscriptions Vol. XXVI and Epigraphia Indica Vol. XXXIX. Srinivasan died on 8 December 2011.
