= Mohanur railway station =

Railway station in Tamil Nadu, India

Mohanur

General information
- Location: Mohanur Railway Station Road, Mohanur, Tamil Nadu, India
- Coordinates: 11°04′08.2″N 78°08′23.9″E
- Elevation: 123 metres (404 ft)
- System: Indian Railways station
- Owner: Indian Railways
- Line: Salem Junction–Karur Junction line
- Platforms: 3
- Tracks: 3

Construction
- Structure type: On-ground

Other information
- Station code: MONR
- Zone(s): Southern Railway zone
- Division(s): Salem
- Fare zone: Southern Railway zone

History
- Opened: May 2013 (13 years ago)
Route map
Location
- Location within India Location within Tamil Nadu

Mohanur railway station (station code: MONR) is an NSG–6 category Indian railway station in Salem railway division of Southern Railway zone. It is a railway station situated in Mohanur, Namakkal district in the Indian state of Tamil Nadu. The station is an intermediate station on the newly commissioned Salem Junction–Karur Junction line which became operational in May 2013.
