= Kolli Hills =

Mountain range in India

Kollimalai
- Hill Station
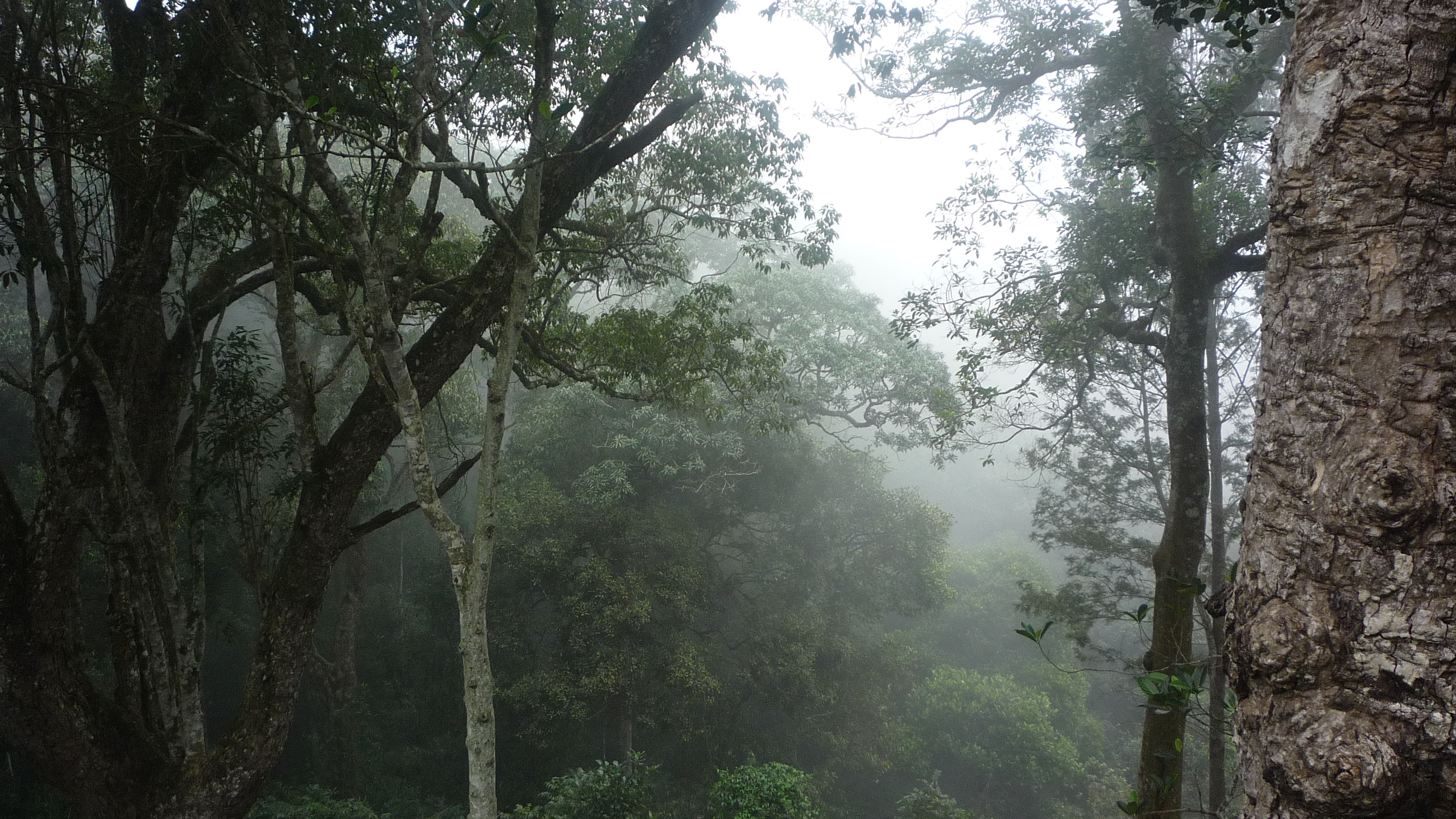
- Kollipavai

- Location within Tamil Nadu
- Coordinates: 11°19′47″N 78°23′36″E
- Country: India
- State: Tamil Nadu
- Region: Kongu nadu
- District: Namakkal
- Taluk: Kollimalai

Area
  - Total: 383 km^{2} (148 sq mi)
- Elevation: 1,300 m (4,300 ft)

Population (2001)
  - Total: 99,500
  - Density: 260/km^{2} (673/sq mi)

Languages
  - Official: Tamil
- Time zone: UTC+5:30 (IST)
- Postal code: 637411
- Vehicle registration: TN 28
- Tamil and English spoken

Kolli Malai, also known as Kolli Hills, is a hill station and taluk in Namakkal district, Tamil Nadu, India.

== Origin of the name ==
The hills are named Kolli Malai after the goddess Etukkai Amman (also known as Kollipavai), who guards the hills with her divine protection.

== Historical references ==
The Kolli Hills are featured in several works of classical Tamil literature such as Silappathigaram, Manimekalai, Purananuru and Akananuru. Mahavidwan R. Raghava Iyengar in the research monograph Araichi Katturaigal has given exhaustive references to Kollipavai from early Sangam literature, concluding that her image is in Kolli Hills. The region was ruled by Valvil Ori around 200 CE, who is praised as one of the seven great philanthropists of ancient Tamil Nadu. His valor and marksmanship are sung by several poets, and his exploits are a popular part of folklore. Ori is said to have killed a lion, a bear, a deer and a boar with a single arrow.

The hills are said to be guarded by Kollipavai, also called Ettukkai Amman, the local deity. According to legend, the sages chose Kolli Hills when they were looking for a peaceful place to do their penance. However, the demons invaded the hills to disrupt the penance when the sages began their rituals. The sages prayed to Kollipavai, who according to the myth, chased away the demons with her enchanting smile. Kollipavai is still worshipped by the people here, and her smile is revered. The hills have several mythological legends associated with them, and often come across as an eerie place in contemporary tales due to the unexplored and less traveled terrain. These hills are full of herbs which retains health and vigour. E. D. Israel Oliver King of the MS Swaminathan Research Foundation has documented over 250 sacred forests in Kolli Hills in the year 2005.

== Infrastructure ==
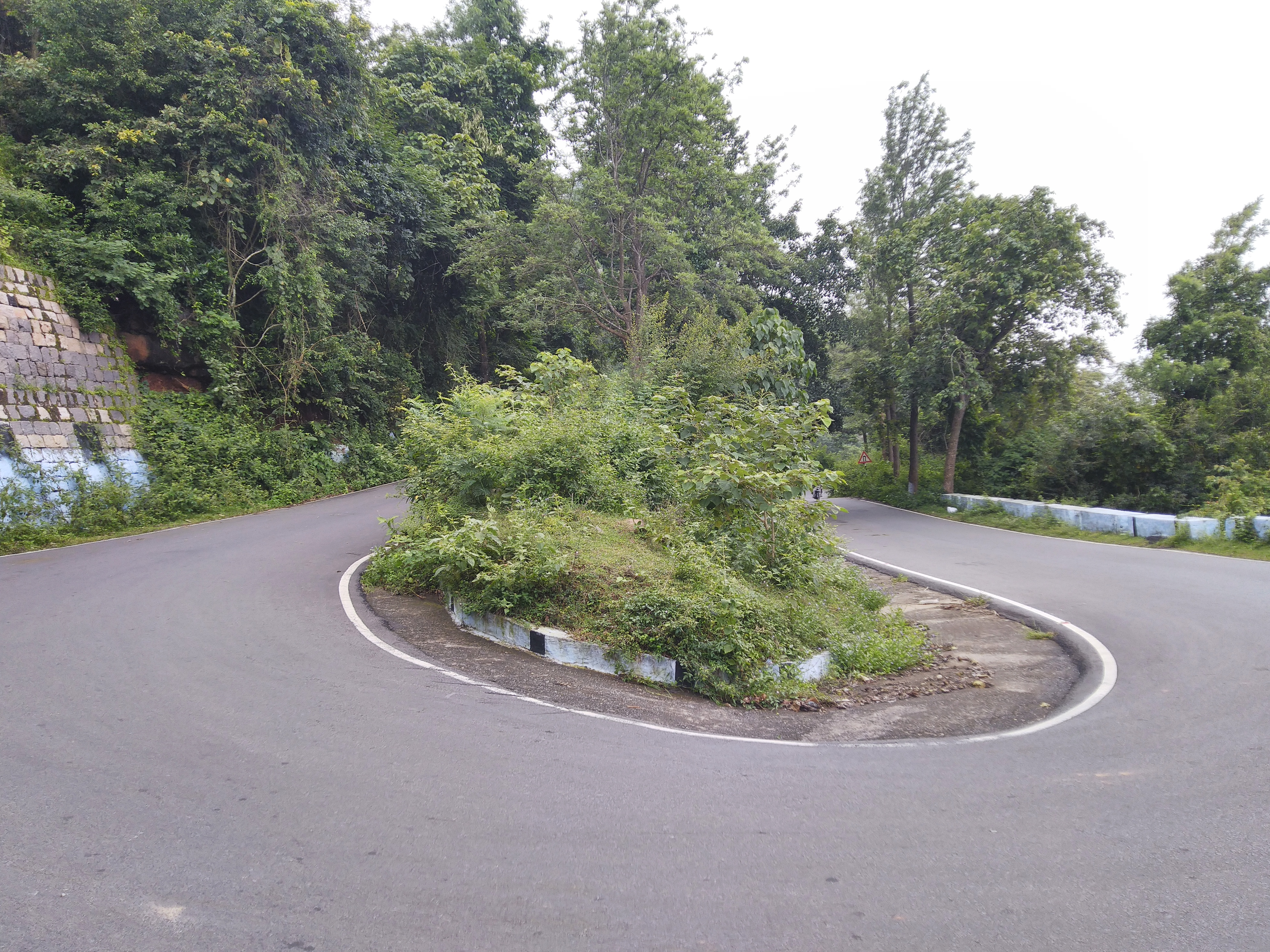
34th Hairpin on the Karavalli - Kolli Hill road

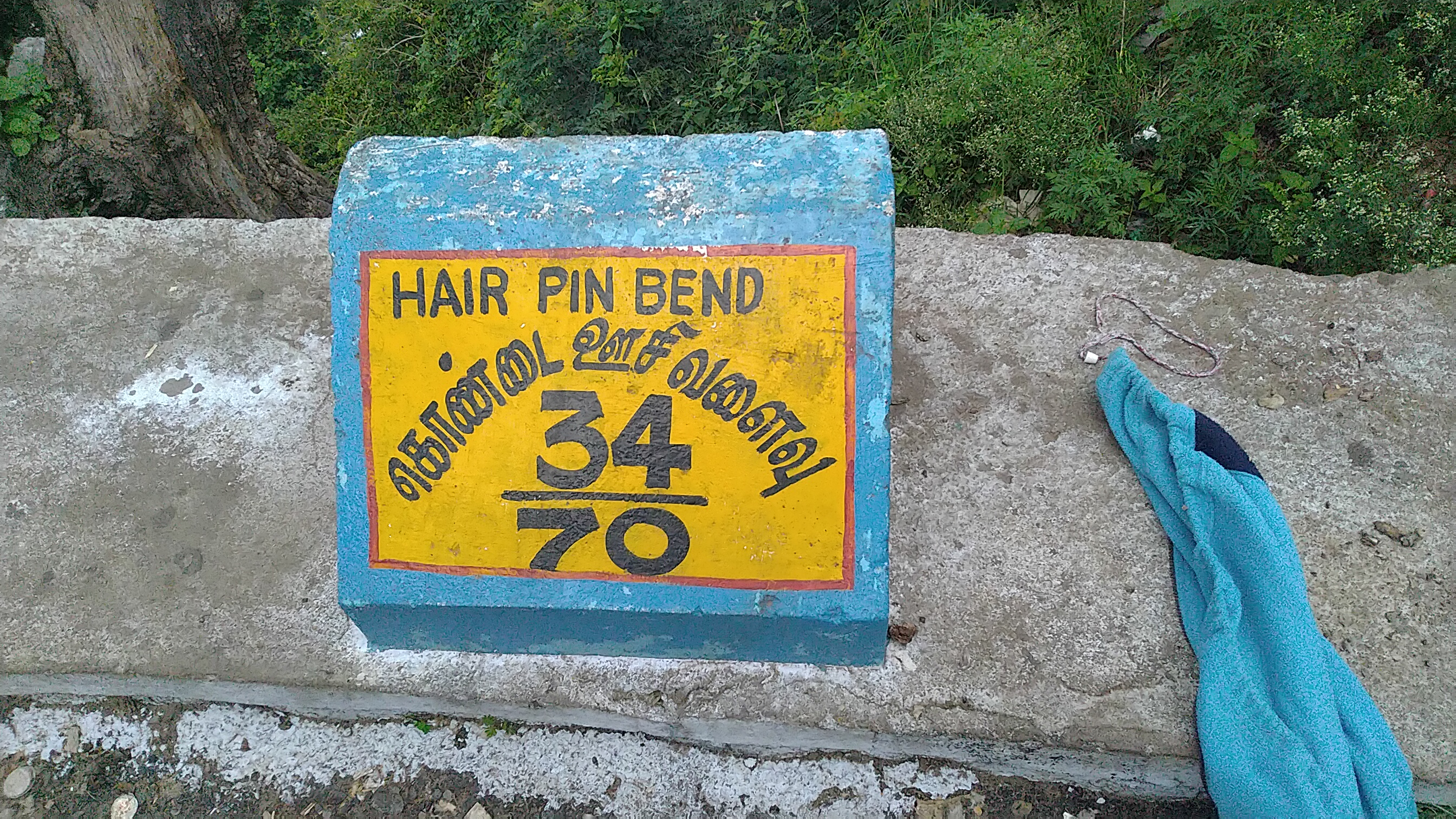
The 34th hairpin on the way to Kolli Hills

The Kolli Hills are a taluk and form a part of Namakkal district. Semmedu village is the headquarters for the Kolli Hills block and Semmedu is connected by road from Namakkal and Salem. Nowadays the bus service is provided up to Arappaleeswarar Temple. BSNL (earlier DOT) established the first telecommunication networks (LDPCO) in 1977, and the telecom facilities have been continuously expanded to meet the requirements of the Kolli Hills.

== Farming ==
Apart from its historical significance, the hills are covered with tropical moist mixed evergreen forests, but increasing areas of forests have been cleared for farming. Farm products of the hills include black pepper and other spices, jackfruit, banana, pineapple, oranges, and tapioca. Rice and minor millets (foxtail, finger millet and little millet) form the staple food of the tribal people who inhabit these hills. The jackfruit grown on the hills is well known for its taste and fragrance and is often soaked in wild honey that is also harvested from the hills.

== Reserve forests ==
The hills are covered by green vegetation in the spring and monsoon and are streaked with streams. There are three reserve forests that are controlled by the government of Tamil Nadu: Ariyur Solai, Kundur Nadu, and Pulianjolai.

== Religious significance ==
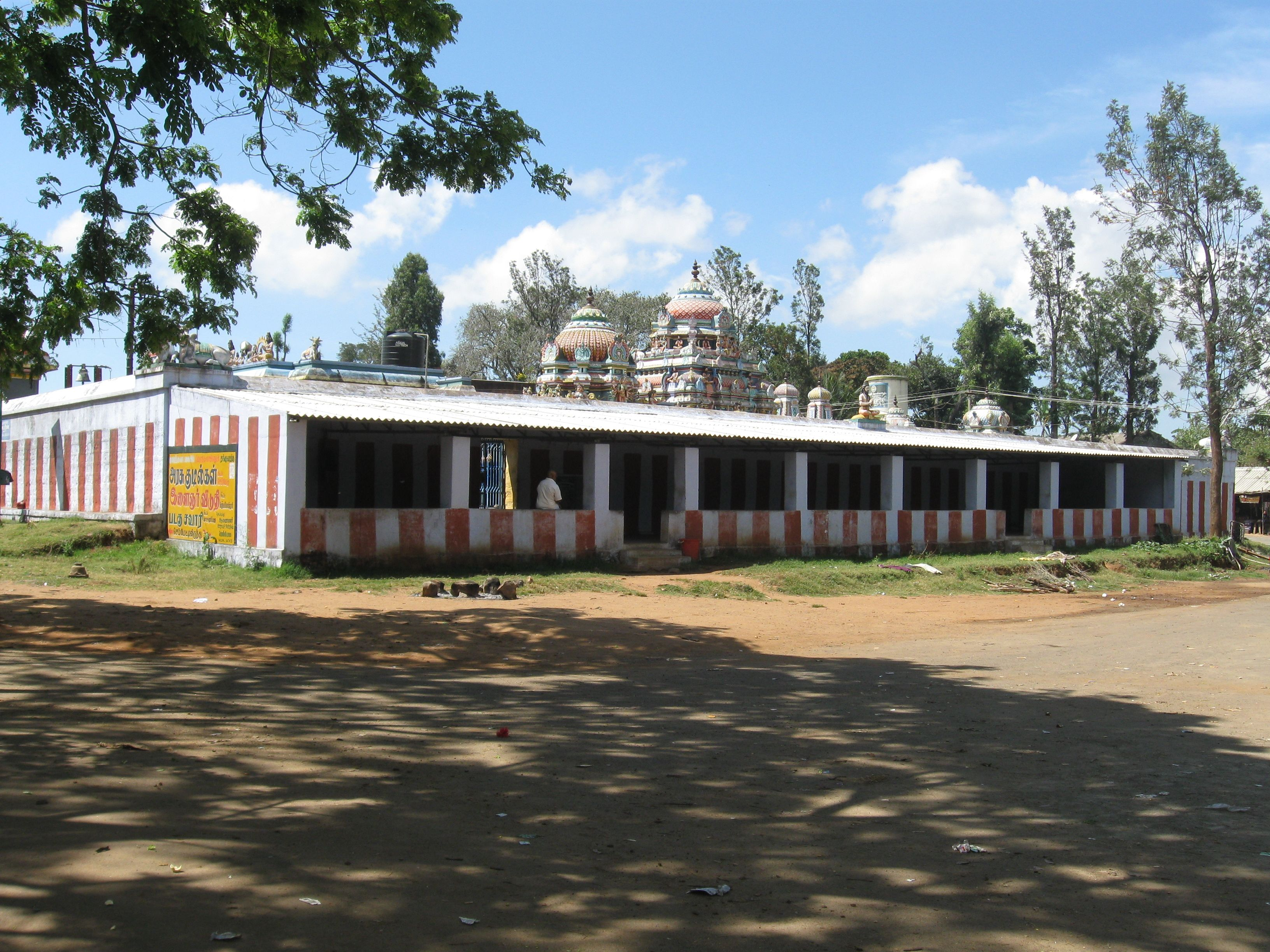
Arapaleeswarar temple

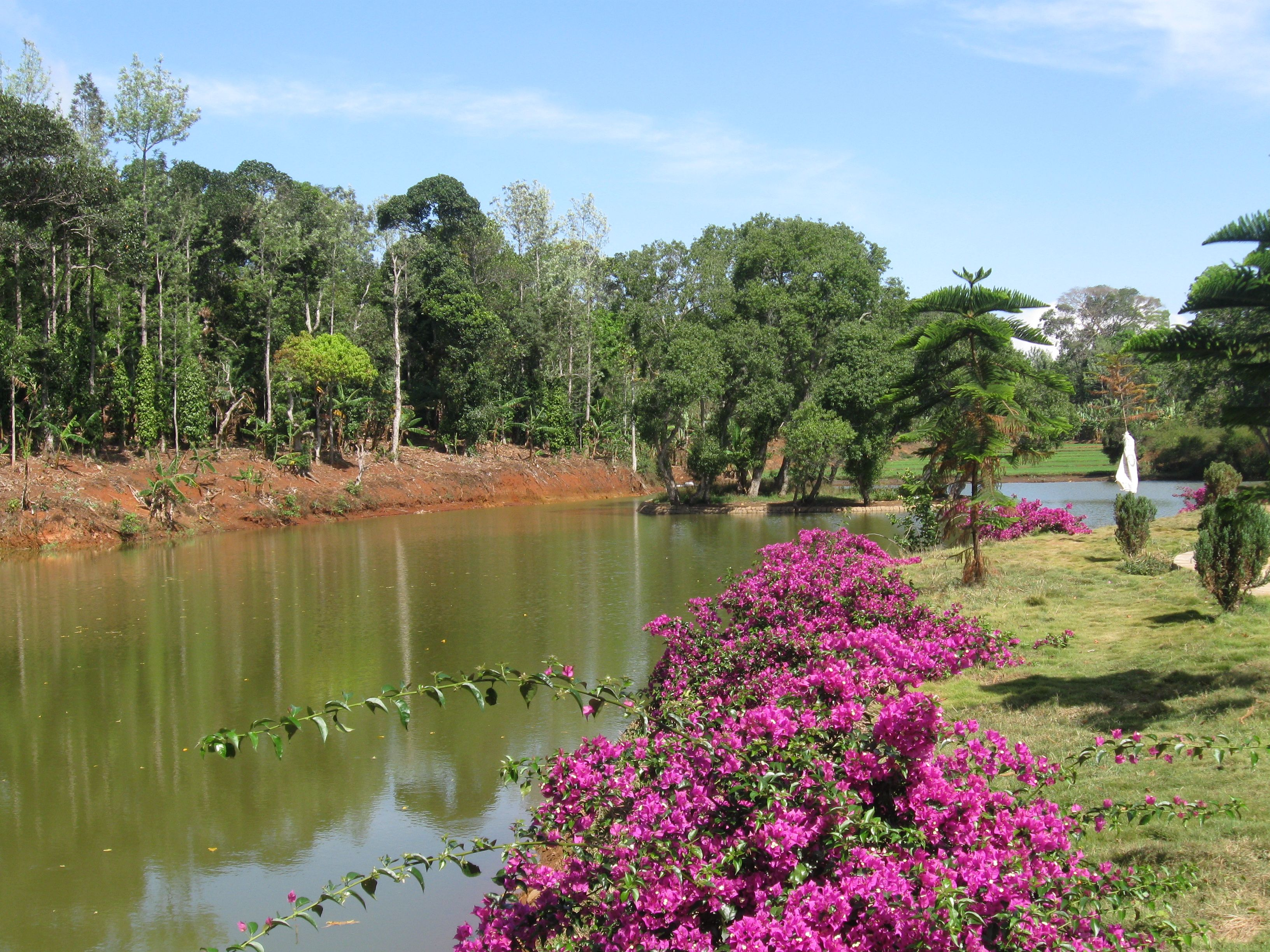
A serene pond

The hills are a site of pilgrimage, because of the Arapaleeswarar temple, which is believed to have a secret path to the Shiva temple in Rasipuram. This Shiva temple is said to have been built by Valvil Ori in the 1st or 2nd century CE when he ruled this area. "Arappaleeswara sathakam" is a poem which praises Lord Arappaleeswarar. It is believed that this temple existed during the Sangam period itself.

According to legend, the Shiva linga in the temple was found when a farmer was ploughing his land. It is said that the farmer accidentally hit the Shiva linga while ploughing, and that led blood to ooze out of the statue. The small wound is said to be visible on the Shiva linga even today.

There is also a temple for Ettukai Amman or Kollipavai, which is one of the oldest in the town.

== Tourism ==
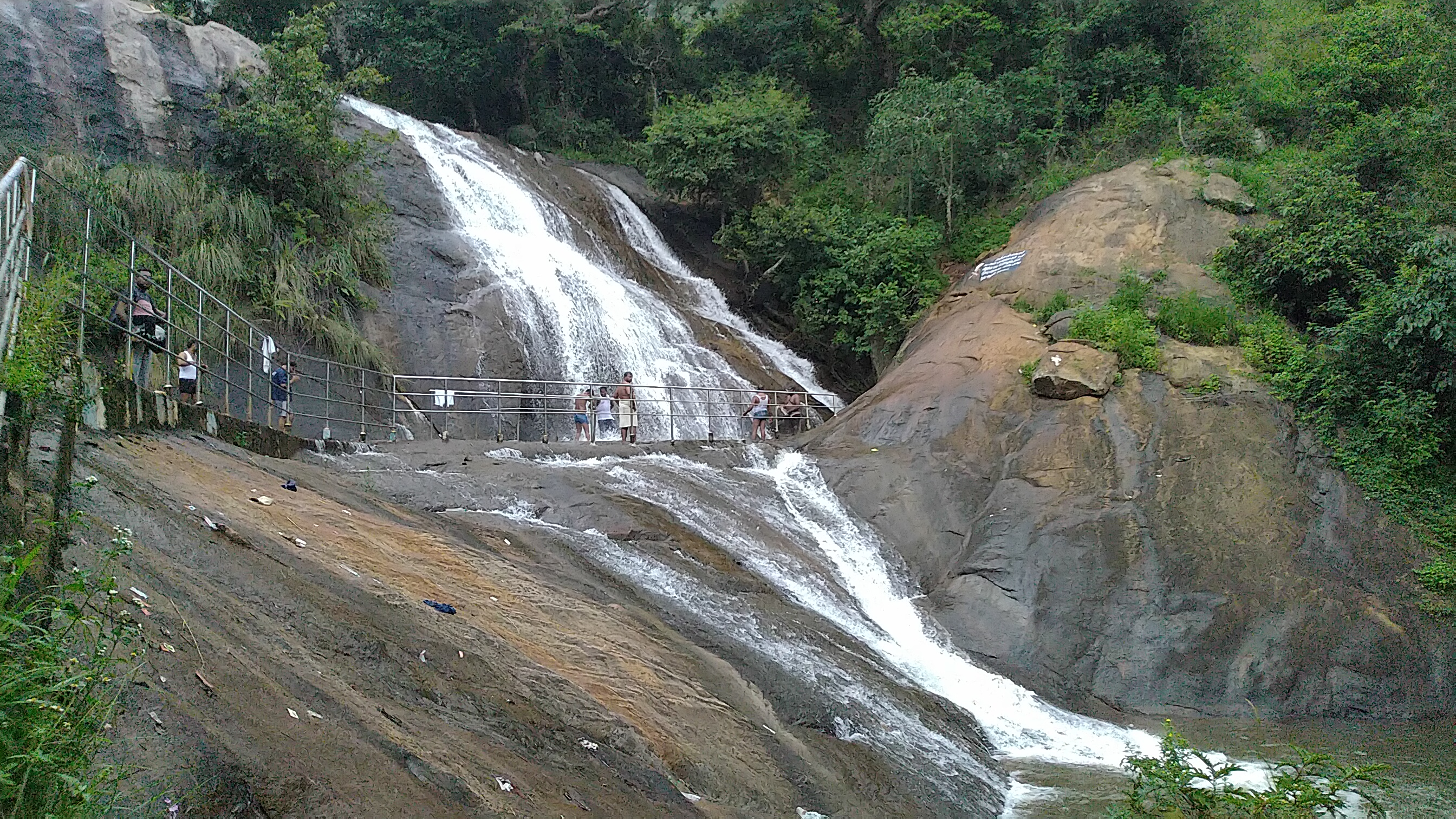
Masila Falls on Kolli Hills

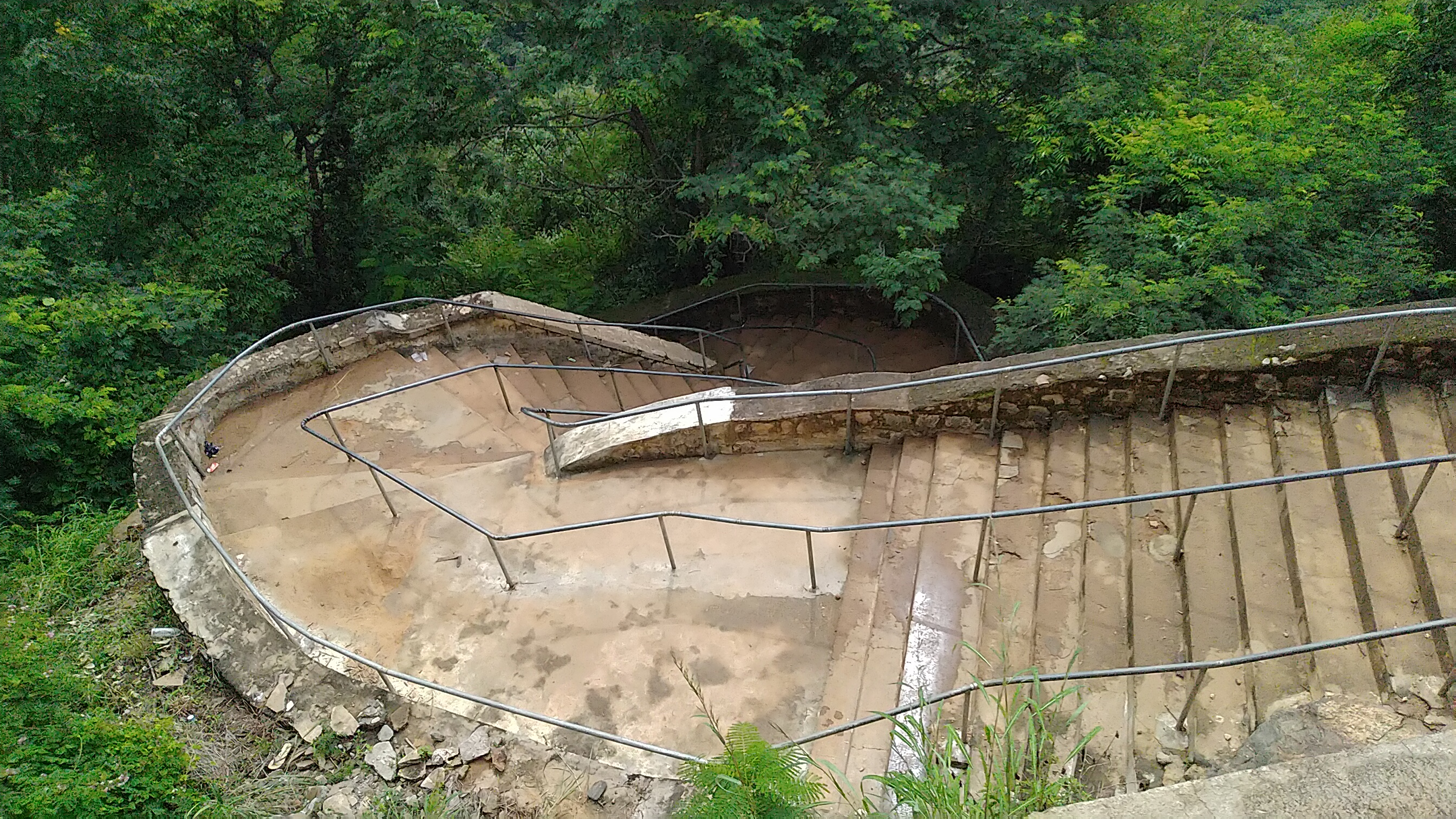
Stairs leading to Agaya Gangai Waterfalls

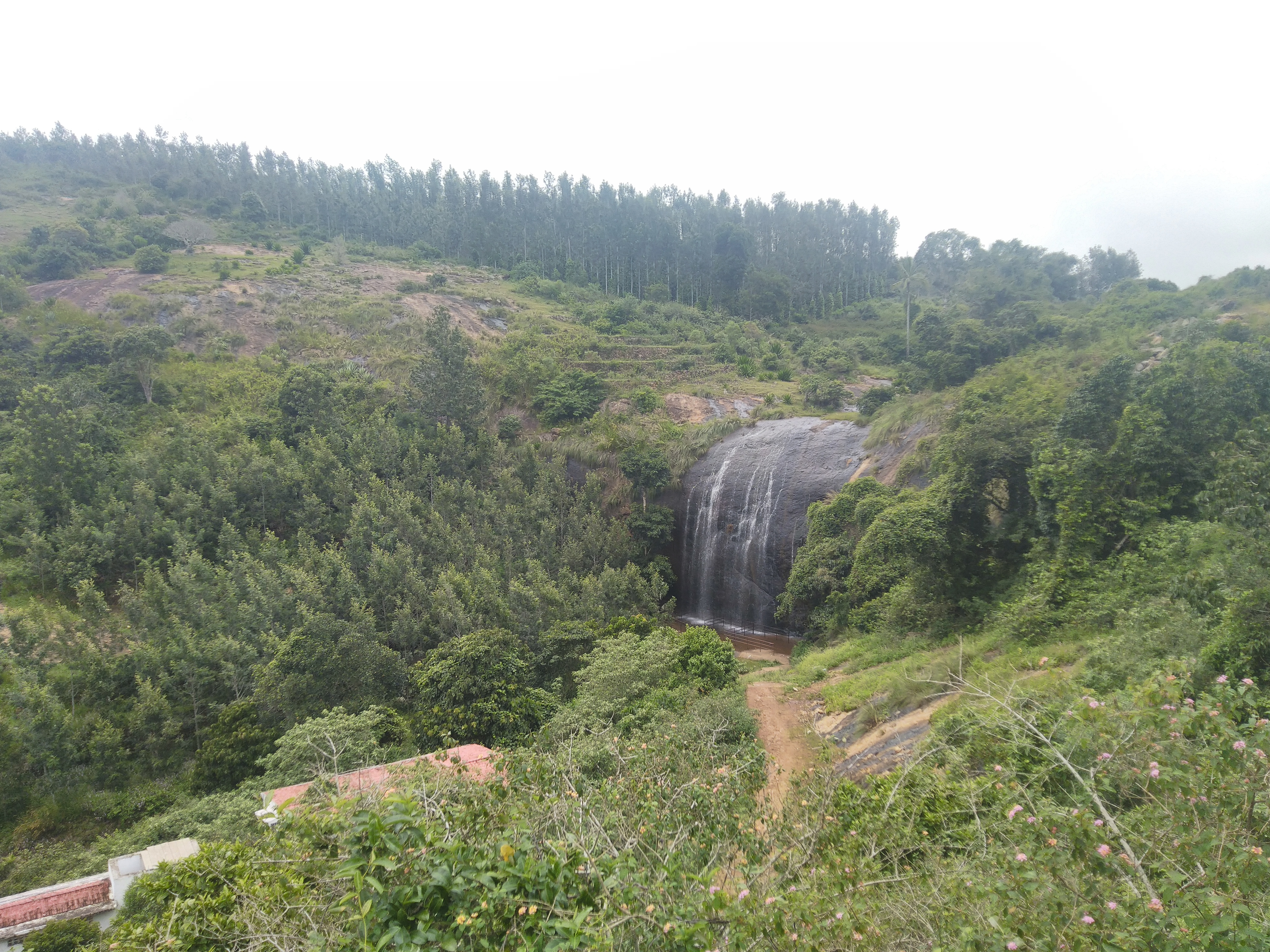
Namma Aruvi falls

Kolli Hills is visited by nature lovers, hikers, trekking clubs, tourists and meditation practitioners among hill stations in Tamil Nadu. Agaya Gangai is the waterfall situated near the Arappaleeswarar temple.

== Surrounding places ==
Under the foothills of the Kolli Hills, many small and big towns exist. From these places the hills are visible in a panoramic view, and the climatic conditions of these places are influenced by the climatic conditions of the Kolli Hills. The following are a few of the towns surrounding the Kolli Hills: Namakkal, Kalappanaickenpatti, Belukuruchi, Sendamangalam, Rasipuram, Namagiripettai, Thammampatti, Mullukkurichi, Vairichettipalayam, Puliancholai, Pavithiram, and Pasarikombai. All these places are well connected by bus services.

People of Kolli Hills come down by foot with their produce to the foothills of Kolli Hills, where they sell their produce and go back after buying their required materials. This activity takes place in settlements like Karavalli, Belukurichi, Pavithiram, Thammampatti, and Puliancholai. People from various surrounding places of Tamil Nadu come to Belukurichi to buy the products of Kolli Malai.

== Flora and fauna ==
Forests here are rich and diverse. Higher up the slopes, patches of tropical evergreen forests occur, and Ariyur Solai is one such. These forests are home to several species of endemic trees and plants. Kolli Hills is said to have the largest expanse of evergreen or shola forest cover anywhere in the entire southern part of the Eastern Ghats. Several coffee plantations, fruit orchards and silver-oak estates occur in this region.

Wildlife in the region includes the sloth bear, barking deer, slender loris, Indian pangolin, jackals, mongoose and palm civet; many reptiles, including endemic species like the lizards Draco dussumieri, Varanus bengalensis, and Calotes calotes, the endangered Python molurus, and rare, non venomous snakes of the family Uropeltidae, including the recently discovered Uropeltis rajendrani and Rhinophis goweri; and a number of birds, such as crested serpent eagle, Indian grey hornbill and laughing thrush. Among the lizards, Hemiphyllodactylus kolliensis and Hemidactylus kolliensis are endemic only to Kolli Hills.

== See also ==
- Paul Brand
- Agaya Gangai
- Masi periasamy
