= Puliancholai =

Poliancholai
- Small Village
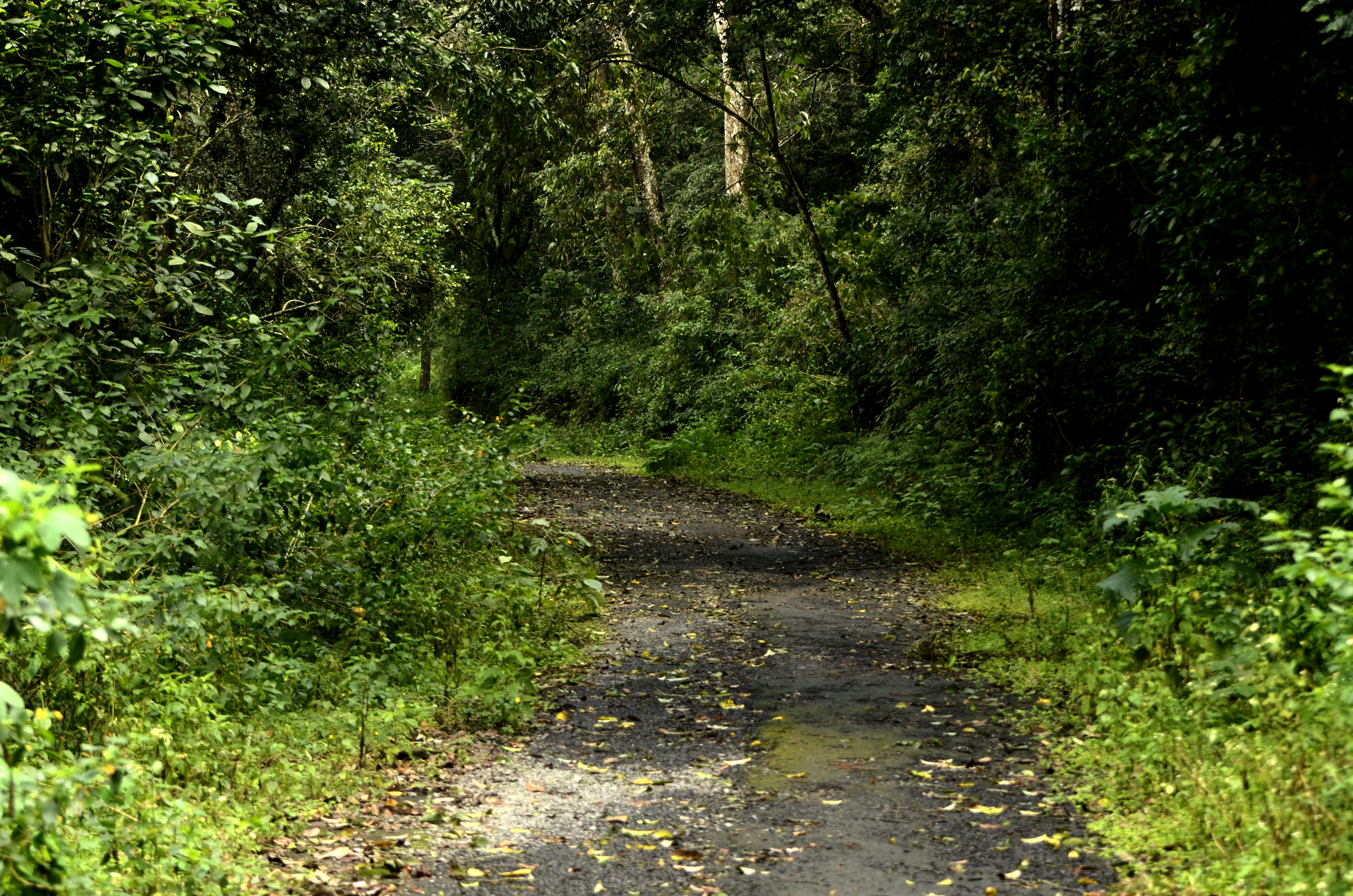

- Location in Tamil Nadu, India Poliancholai (India)
- Coordinates: 11°15′4″N 78°28′25″E
- Country: India
- State: Tamil Nadu
- District: Namakkal
- Taluk: Kollimalai

Languages
  - Official: Tamil
- Time zone: UTC+5:30 (IST)

Puliancholai is a small village in Kolli Hills (Eastern Ghats) Namakkal district, Tamil Nadu, India.

== Tourism ==
The area is rich in cultural heritage, being the centre of Chola architecture. Numerous temples, monuments, and other examples of architecture unique to that area dot the region. Lack of a proper shelter or basic facilities is the only limitation for long stays.

Apart from tourists, devotees come to trek up to a Shiva temple about 12 km into the forest in June and July. Apart from tourism, their main livelihood is in marginal agriculture and gathering the fruits that grow wild in the forest to sell to local markets.

A few hours travel by road would take one to Pachaimalai Hills, another hill range with a 150-ft waterfall. In the neighbouring Perambalur district there are areas like Vettakudi and Karavatti bird sanctuaries.

== Nature ==
Kolli Hills are known for their medicinal herbs. A few kilometres into the forest, in the higher hills called Agaya Gangai (Heavenly Ganges), there are water falls, part of a river system that feeds the stream at Puliancholai. The stream is known locally as Iyyaar or Kallaar; it grows into a wild river during rains, and is believed to have medicinal properties.

Puliancholai was an undisturbed area of shrub jungle and riverine forests rich in wildlife.
