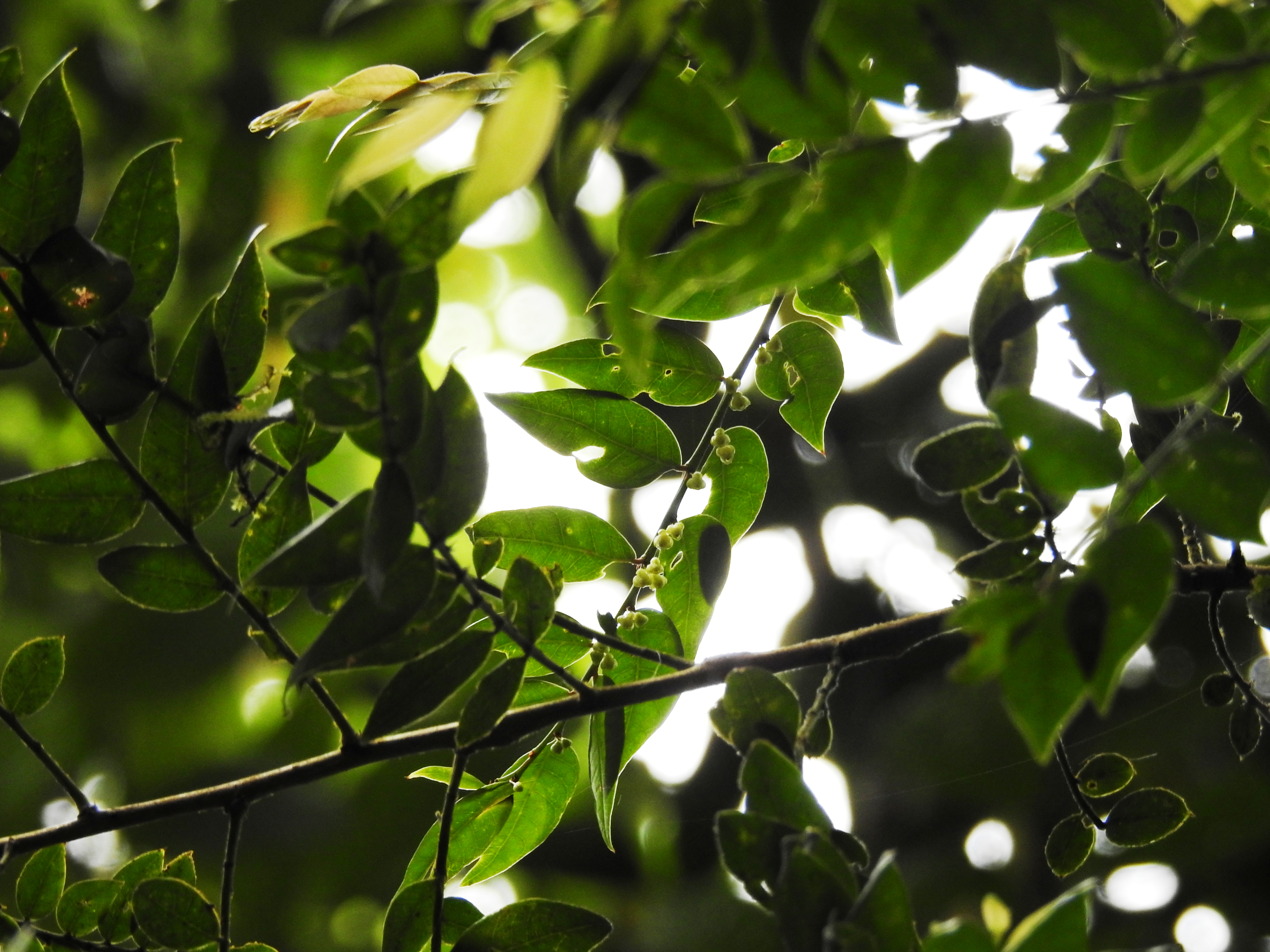

Conservation status
- Endangered (IUCN 3.1)

Scientific classification
- Kingdom: Plantae
- Clade: Tracheophytes
- Clade: Angiosperms
- Clade: Eudicots
- Clade: Rosids
- Order: Malpighiales
- Family: Phyllanthaceae
- Genus: Phyllanthus
- Species: P. anamalayanus

Binomial name
- Phyllanthus anamalayanus (Gamble) G.L.Webster

Synonyms
- Emblica anamalayana (Gamble) R.W.Bouman; Pseudoglochidion anamalayanum Gamble

= Phyllanthus anamalayanus =

Species of flowering plant

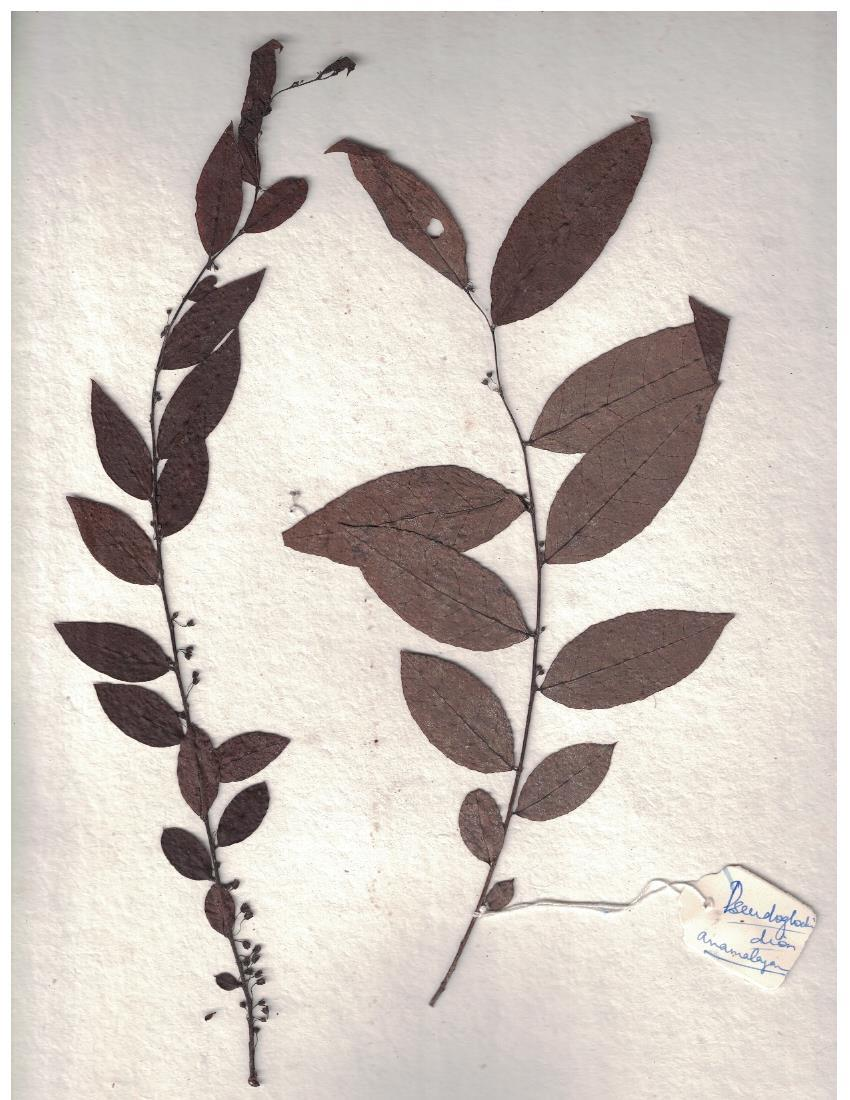
Twig of Phyllanthus anamalayanus from the Anamalai Hills

Phyllanthus anamalayanus is a species of plant in the family Phyllanthaceae. It is endemic to the Anamalai Hills in Coimbatore district in the state of Tamil Nadu, India. The species is a shrub or small tree occurring in the understorey of mid-elevation tropical montane evergreen rain forests in the Anamalai Hills, and is endemic to the Western Ghats. It is threatened by habitat loss.

== Description ==
The species is an evergreen shrub or small tree occurring in the understorey, reaching a height of 4.5 to 6 m. The leaves are simple, alternate, ovate or lanceolate, about 4 – 9 cm long by 1.5 to 3 cm broad, rounded to acute at base, with entire margins, glabrous, acute to acuminate at apex with regular nerves and glaucous beneath. There are 10 to 14 leaves per branchlet, which is phyllanthoid, and in a distichous arrangement. Flowers are small, dioecious, axillary and inconspicuous attached to underside of twigs and lack petals. The flowering branchlets may continue to grow and produce leaves after flowering.

The tree is monoceious. The male flowers occur in clusters, with no petals and have 3 stamens, erect, joined or free; anthers extrorse, the cells dehiscing longitudinally. The pedicels of the male flowers are filiform (thread-like). The female flowers are solitary or occur in clusters of 2 – 3, with a 1 mm long and thick pedicel and 6 sepals, biseriate, as in staminate flowers. The ovary is ovoid and 3-celled with 2 ovules in each cell. The glabrous fruit capsule has 3-4 cells and lobes and is about 7 mm to 10 mm broad. Seeds are trigonous, rounded on the back, often pitted on the faces, with fleshy and unequal cotyledons.

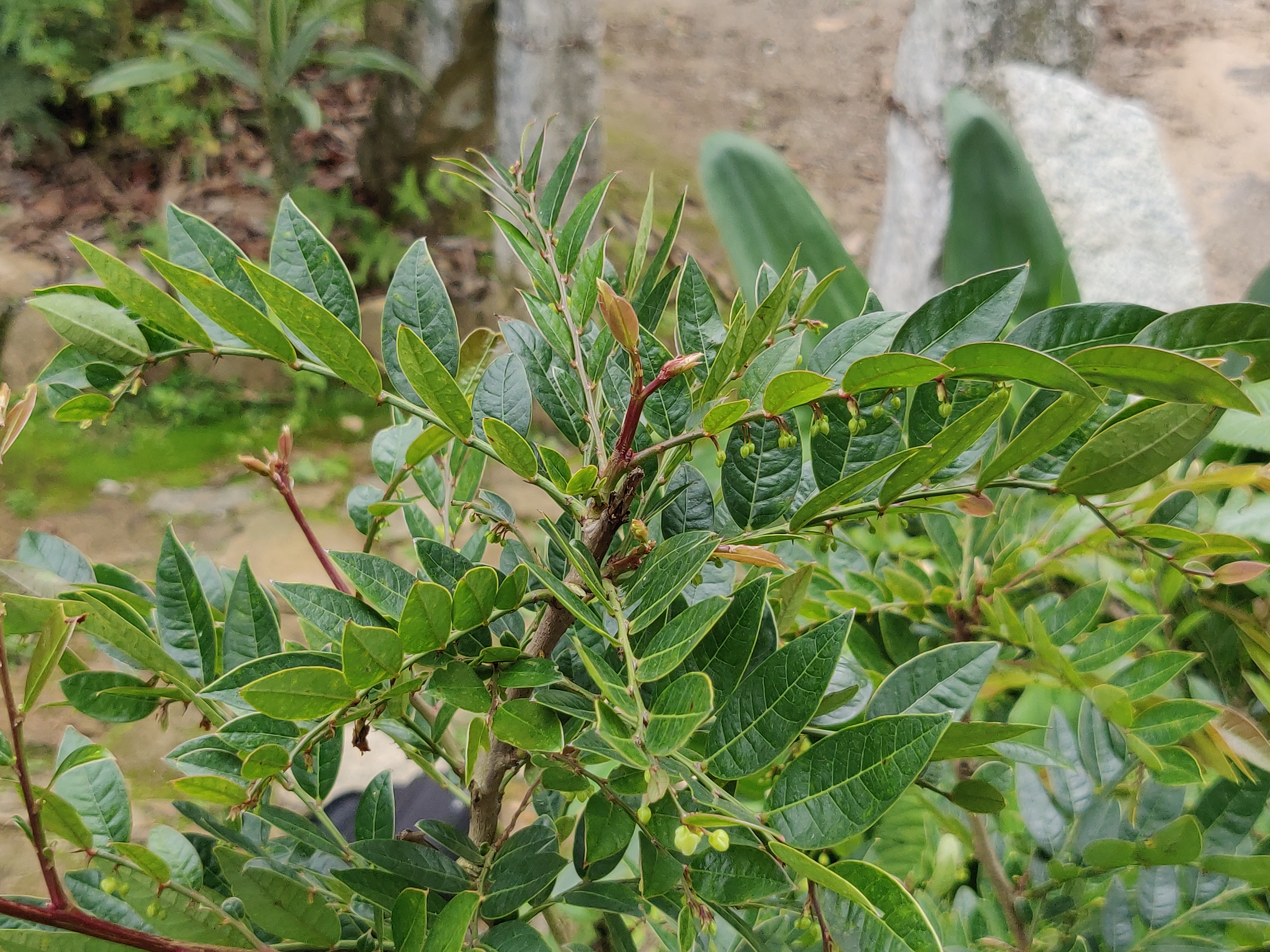
Shoot and branchlets

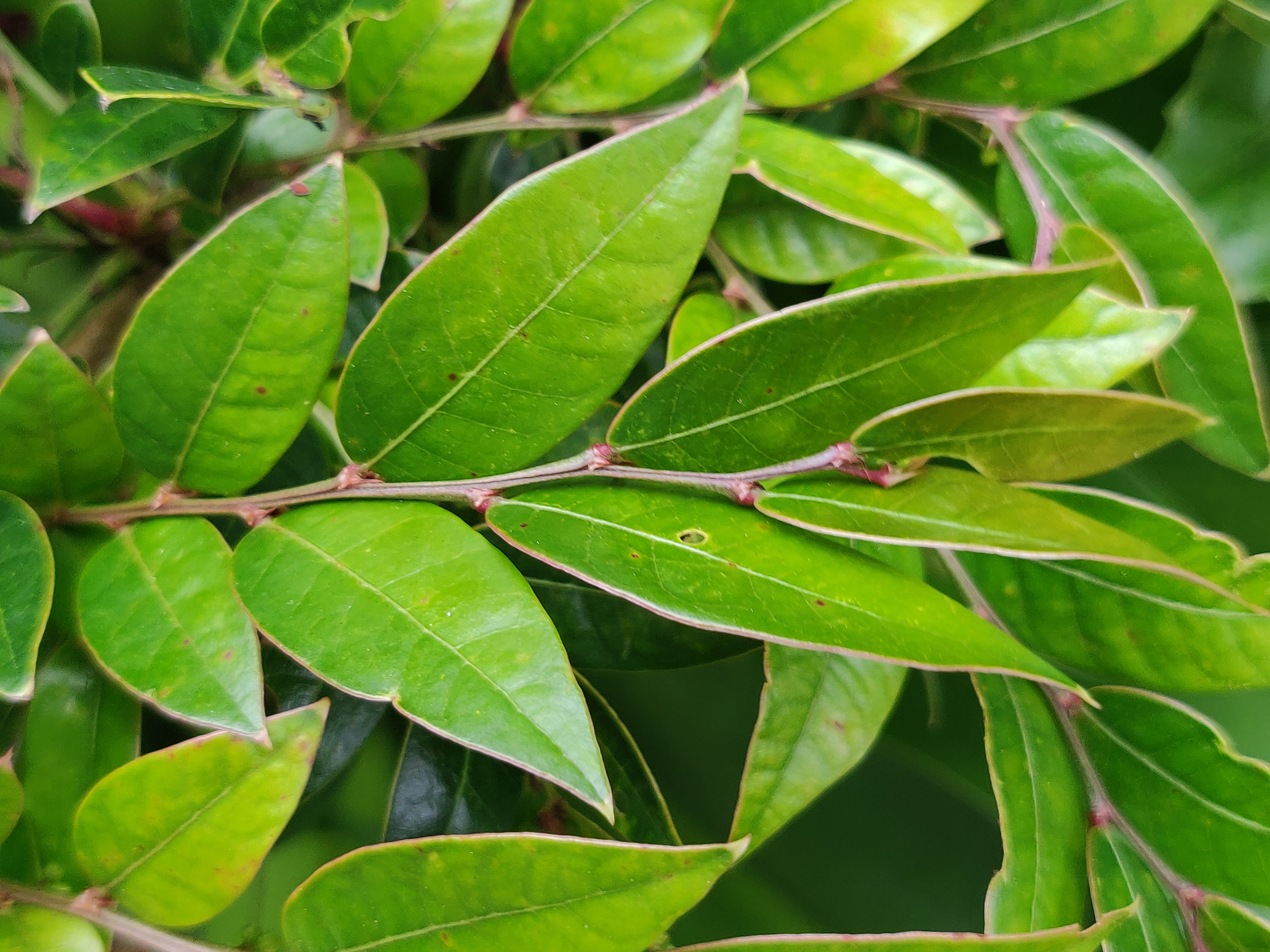
Leaves of Phyllanthus anamalayanus

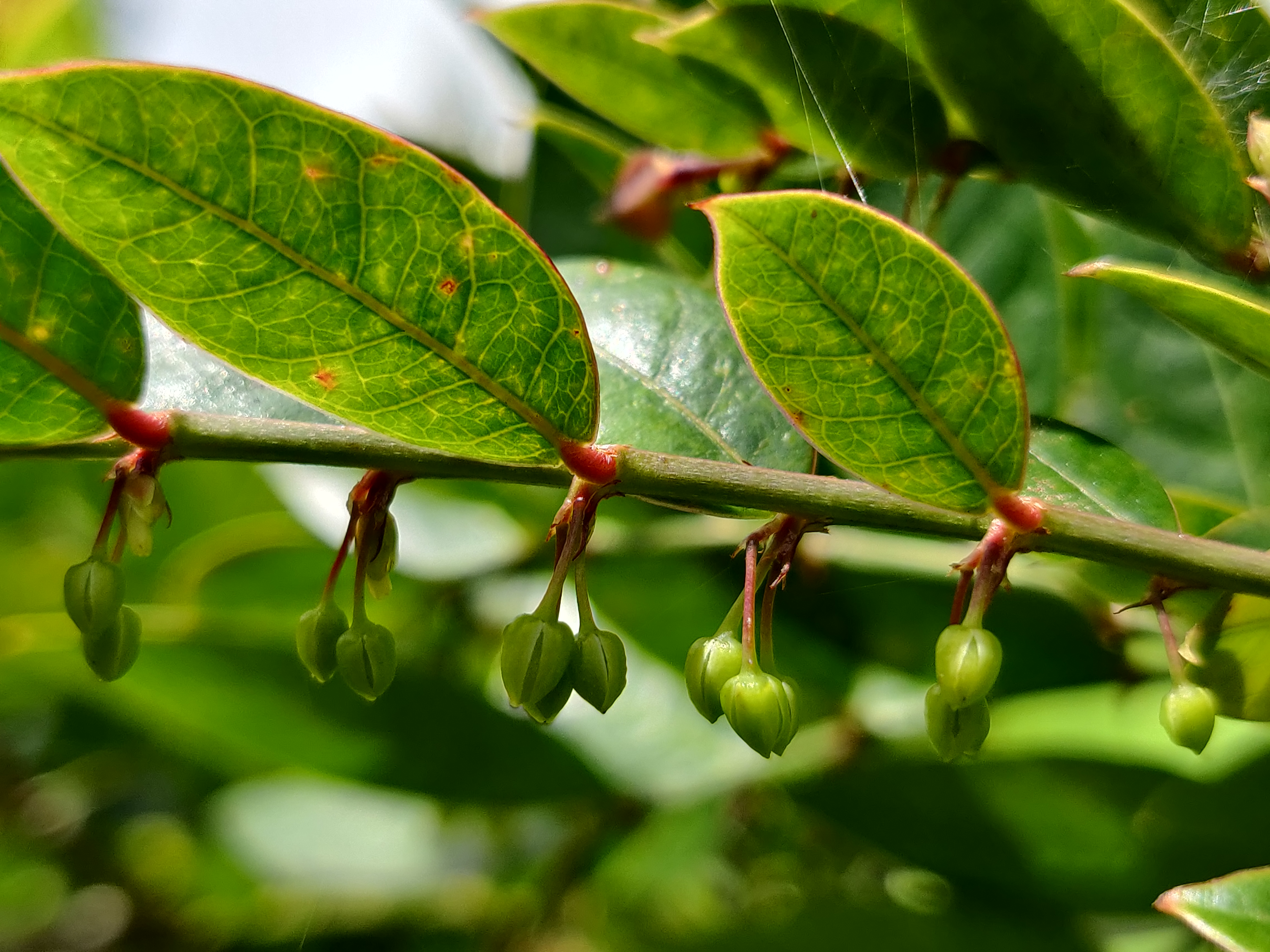
Male flowers in clusters (note thin pedicels)

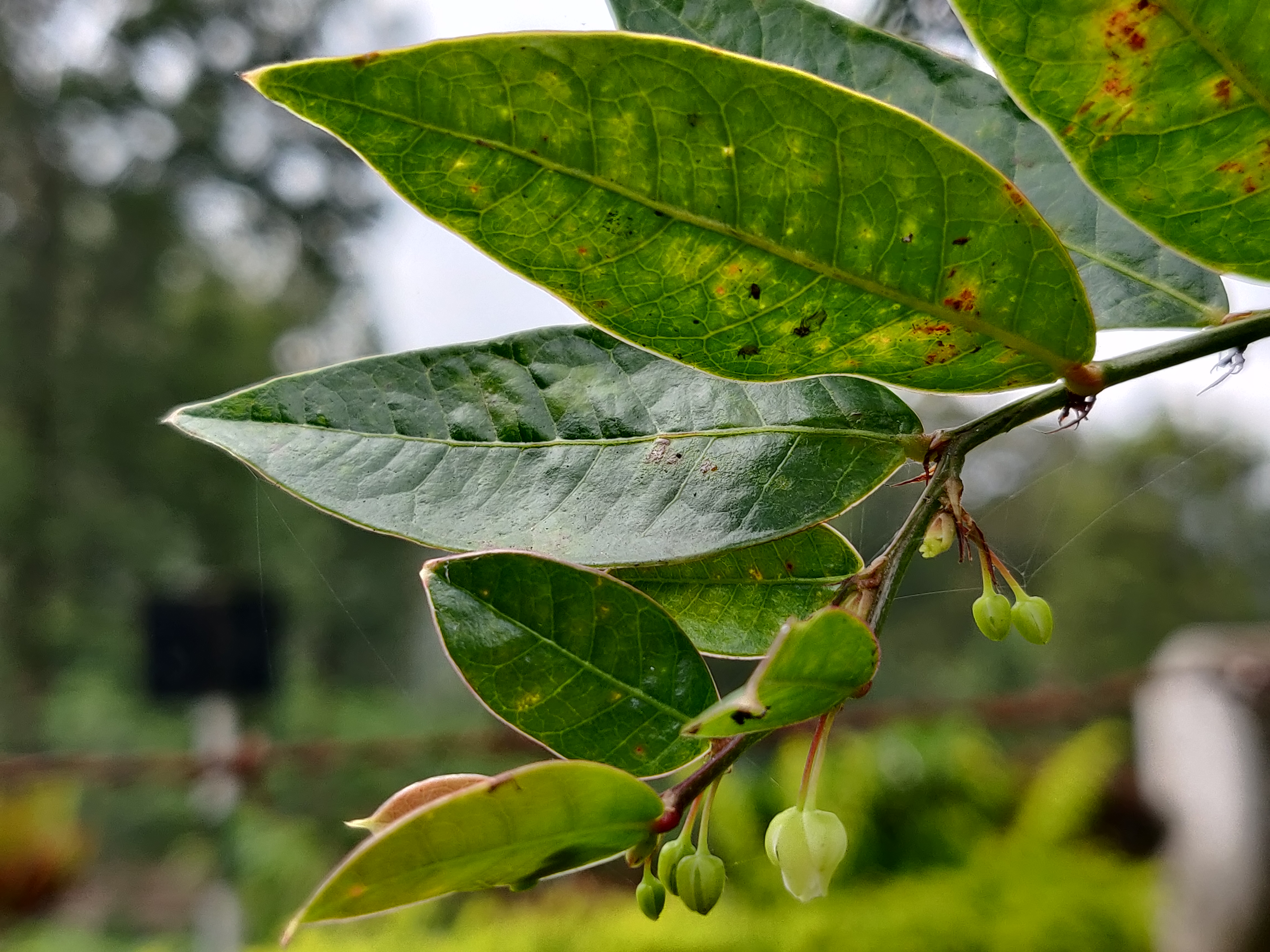
Twig with male flowers and female flowers (with short, thick pedicel)

== Taxonomy ==
The species was earlier named as Pseudoglochidion anamalayanum. Genetic analyses affirm that Pseudoglochidion is nested among the species in Phyllanthus Genus, and in the subgenus Isocladus, which is itself polyphyletic, while morphological characters also support placement of the species in Phyllanthus.

== Distribution and habitat ==
Phyllanthus anamalayanus is restricted to the Anamalai Hills of the Western Ghats. The plant is reported in tropical wet evergreen rainforest between 1,100 m and 1,400 m elevation. The species' habitat is reported to be confined to evergreen forest with canopy density of 50 to 80%, with the species absent in locations under very dense or multi-storied canopy.

== Ecology and phenology ==
Aspects of ecology and phenology are known from a single study from the Anamalai Hills. According to this study, the plant grows in loamy soil with pH ranging from 5–6. It appears to do better at the edges of tropical wet evergreen forest where there is more light penetration, as indicated by more shrubby growth and gregarious flowering and fruiting. Less flowering is noted in forest interiors. The species is reported to flower and fruit throughout the year. The species is reported to propagate vegetatively via suckers besides through germination of seeds below mother plants. Plant species associated with Phyllanthus anamalayanus include forest edge species such as Clerodendrum infortunatum and Mallotus tetracoccus besides mature evergreen forest species such as Cullenia exarillata, Elaeocarpus munroi, Elaeocarpus serratus, Mesua ferrea and Nageia wallichiana.

== Conservation ==
Due to its highly restricted range in the Anamalai Hills, the IUCN Red List assesses Phyllanthus anamalayanus as Endangered.. Previous research indicates a few hundred individuals (saplings and adults) occur in select locations on the Valparai Plateau of the Anamalai Hills.
