= Arapaleeswarar Temple, Kolli Hills =

Temple in Tamil Nadu, India

Coordinates: 11°15′53″N 78°23′23″E

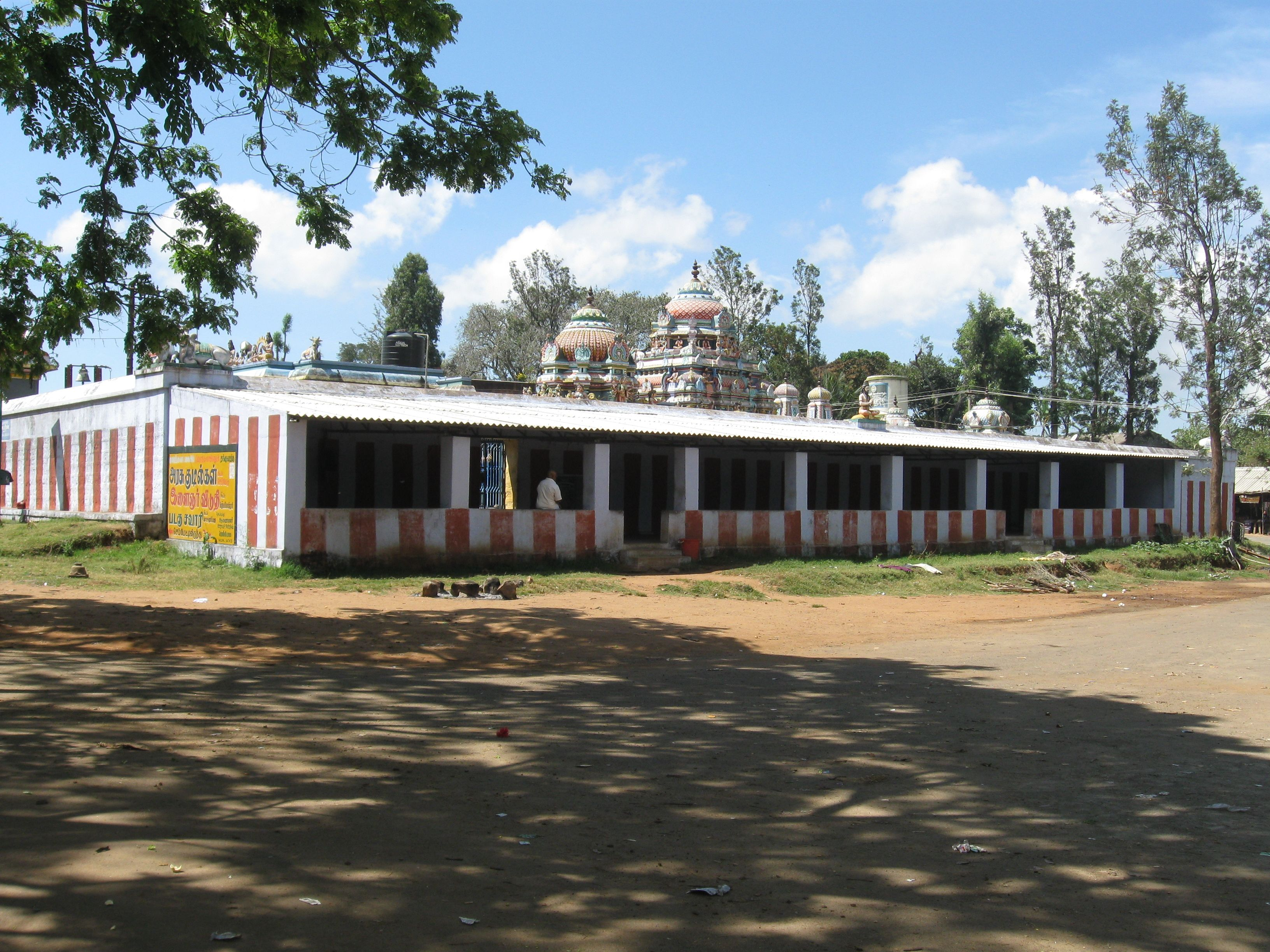
Arapaleeswarar Temple at Kolli Hills

Arapaleeswarar temple, Kolli Malai, also known as Arappalli, is a Siva temple in Kolli Hills in Namakkal District in Tamil Nadu (India).

== Vaippu Sthalam ==
It is one of the shrines of the Vaippu Sthalams sung by Tamil Saivite Nayanars Gnanasambandar and Appar.

== Presiding deity ==
The presiding deity is known as Arapaleeswarar. His consort is known as Aram Valartha Nayaki. Once devotees started cooking with the fishes found in the pond of the temple. They got life and jumped into the water. As the presiding deity saved the fishes which were cut he is known as Arapaleeswarar.

== Agaya Gangai ==
Very near to the temple Agaya Gangai is found. The caves of Korakka Siddhar and Kalanginatha Siddhar are found near Agaya Gangai.
