= Thetukadu =

- village
- Country: India
- State: Tamil Nadu

Languages
  - Official: Tamil
- Time zone: UTC+5:30 (IST)
- Vehicle registration: TN-

Thetukadu is a small village in Tamil Nadu, India, twenty kilometers (12 mi) from Salem. It is on the foothills of Kolli Hills. A Periasamy temple is in the village. Agriculture is the mainstay of the residents of this village. No industries are found there.
