= Semmedu =

Town in India

- Small Town
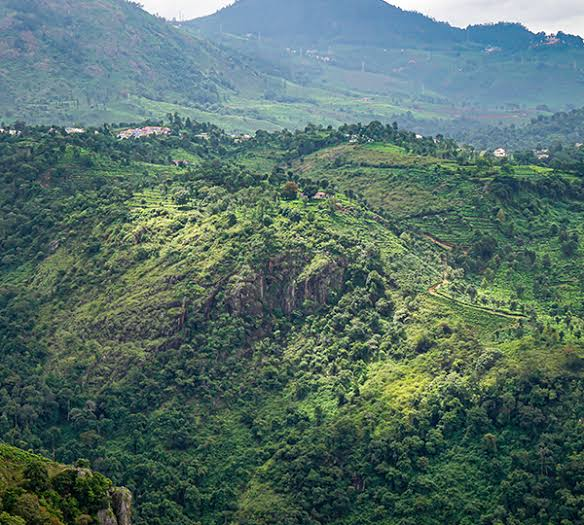

- Location in Tamil Nadu, India
- Coordinates: 11°18′22″N 78°21′26″E
- Country: India
- State: Tamil Nadu
- District: Namakkal
- Taluk: Kollimalai

Population (2011)
  - Total: 9,303

Languages
  - Official: Tamil
- Time zone: UTC+5:30 (IST)
- Postal Index Number: 637411

Semmedu is a Town in Kollimalai Taluk, Namakkal district in the state of Tamil Nadu, India. It is the headquarter of the Kollihils block.

== History ==
Semmedu was founded in the early 1900s by Vellakinar Chinnappa Gounder, who purchased 500 acres of land from an Australian. He brought in settlers of different castes and creed to supplement the few people who were already living there. Later his sons Vellingiri, Palanisamy Kalisamy and Subbiah Gounder continued to develop the village.

== Geography ==
The river Noyyal, a tributary to Cauvery, originates from the Siruvani Hills and flows through this village. The Boluvampatti forest reserve is nearby.
