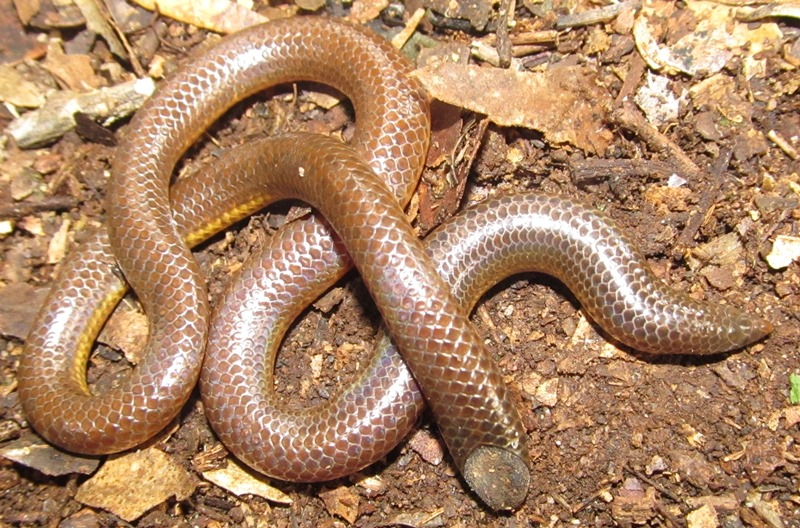

Conservation status
- Critically Endangered (IUCN 3.1)

Scientific classification
- Kingdom: Animalia
- Phylum: Chordata
- Class: Reptilia
- Order: Squamata
- Suborder: Serpentes
- Family: Uropeltidae
- Genus: Rhinophis
- Species: R. goweri

Binomial name
- Rhinophis goweri Aengals & Ganesh, 2013

= Rhinophis goweri =

Species of snake

Rhinophis goweri, also known as Gower's shieldtail snake, is a recently described, little-known species of snake of the family Uropeltidae. It is endemic to the Eastern Ghats of Tamil Nadu in South India. As per the IUCN it is a Critically Endangered snake species.

== Description ==
Rhinophis goweri can be identified by the following combination of characters: midbody scale rows 17; convex caudal shield as long as or longer than shielded part of head; rostral not more than half as long as shielded part of head, separating prefrontal scales for more than half their length; ventral scales 215; venter and outermost scale rows without large spots; uniform dark grayish brown above and off-white heavily powdered with brown below; tail distinctly reddish orange below; dorsum uniform and unpatterned.

== Etymology ==
This species was named after Dr. David Gower, a herpetologist with the Natural History Museum, London, for his work on these snakes.

== Geographic range ==
This species was first described from Bodha Malai bordering Namakkal and Salem district of Tamil Nadu state. Later, surveys in other hills of Eastern Ghats revealed its presence in Kolli Hills, in Namakkal district.

== Habits and habitat ==
This species is slow-moving, nocturnal, fossorial, and lives in the tropical wet forests covering the higher slopes (>900 m (2,950 ft) asl) of the hills. It is thought to feed on earthworms like other snakes of the family Uropeltidae. It becomes more active during monsoon. It has been recorded from an elevation of up to 1,370 m (4,490 ft) asl, atop Kolli Hills in dense forests as well as coffee and pineapple plantations and mixed fruit orchards.
