= Belukurichi =

- Town
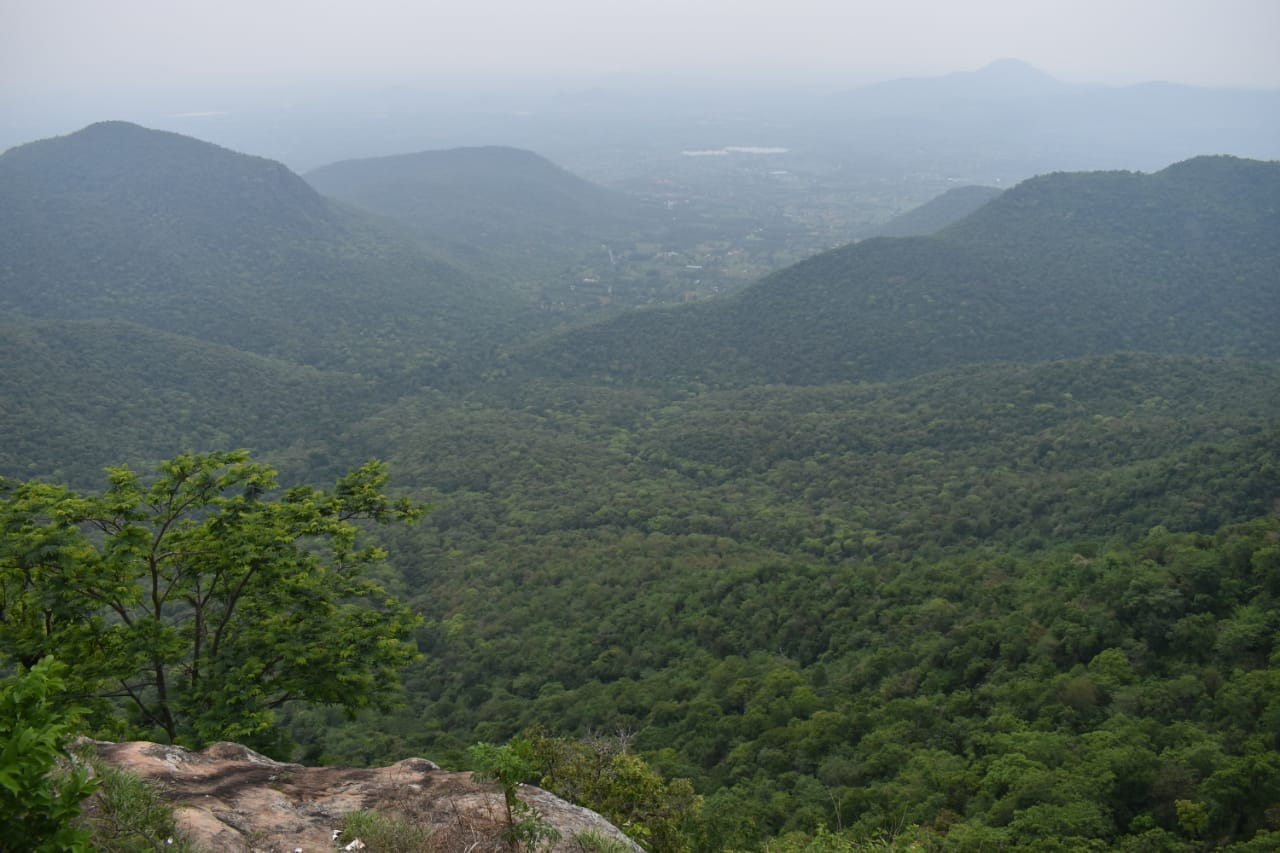

- Location in Tamil Nadu, India Belukurichi (India)
- Coordinates: 11°23′7″N 78°15′10″E
- Country: India
- State: Tamil Nadu
- District: Namakkal
- Taluk: Senthamangalam

Languages
  - Official: Tamil
- Time zone: UTC+5:30 (IST)
- PIN: 637402
- Vehicle registration: TN 28

Belukurichi is a Gram panchayat in Senthamangalam Taluk, Namakkal district in the southern state of Tamil Nadu, India, below Kolli Hills.

The village has a population of about 15,000.
