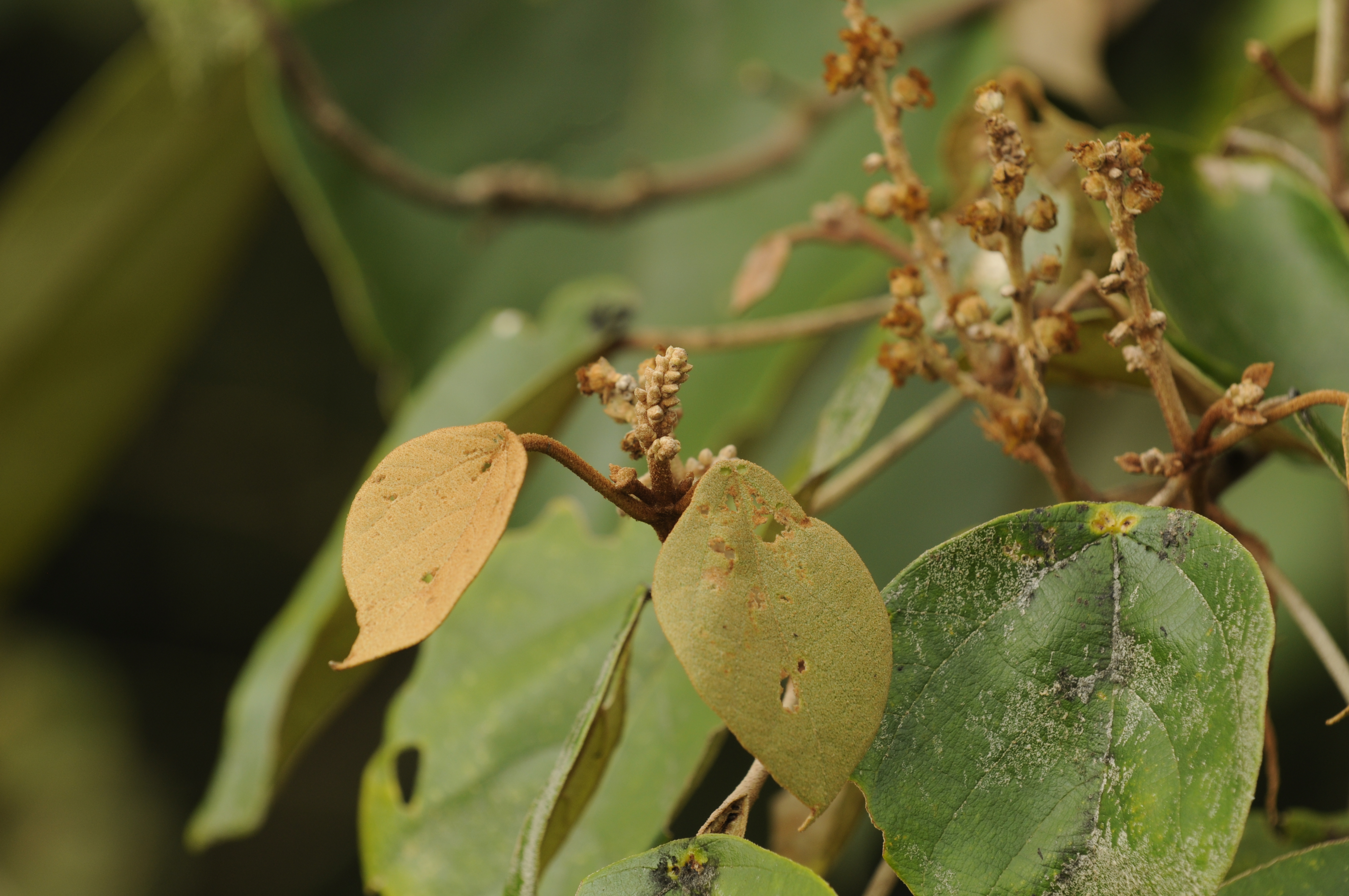

Scientific classification
- Kingdom: Plantae
- Clade: Tracheophytes
- Clade: Angiosperms
- Clade: Eudicots
- Clade: Rosids
- Order: Malpighiales
- Family: Euphorbiaceae
- Genus: Mallotus
- Species: M. tetracoccus

Binomial name
- Mallotus tetracoccus (Roxb.), Kurz.

Synonyms
- Mallotus albus var. occidentalis Hook.f.; Mallotus ferrugineus (Roxb.) Müll.Arg.; Rottlera ferruginea Roxb.; Rottlera tetracocca Roxb.

= Mallotus tetracoccus =

Species of tree

Mallotus tetracoccus, also known as the rusty kamala, is a species of flowering plant in the family Euphorbiaceae. It is a tree species found in parts of south Asia, typically occurring in the edges of tropical wet evergreen and semi-evergreen forests.

== Description ==
This is a distinctive mid-sized or mid-storey tree species growing up to around 15 m tall. The bark is 5–8 mm thick with a grey surface, smooth and fibrous. The tree gains its rusty or coppery-white appearance from the colours of the branchlets, young parts, and undersides of leaves. The branchlets and young parts are densely grey or tawny tomentose (hairy) and the young parts are covered by rusty lepidote scales. The underside of leaves is velvety white due to stellate hairs, contrasting with the bright green and glabrous upper surface. The thinly leathery leaves are simple, alternate, and spirally arranged on the twigs. The lamina is 8–25 cm long x 6.5–20 cm broad, and variable in shape from young saplings to large trees, ranging from more or less circular to deltoid or broadly egg-shaped. The leaf apex is acuminate, and the base truncate, nearly heart-shaped or round. The leaves are peltate (prominently in young plants, more narrowly in adult trees). The leaf margin is entire or glandular dentate (toothed or lobed). The leaves are usually prominently 3-5 ribbed from base, with lateral nerves 6-8 pairs, the tertiary nerves running nearly horizontal. The stipules are lateral and fall off, while the leaf also has a long petiole (4.5–10 cm) which is stout and swollen at the base, stellate tomentose along the length, and with two glands at the top.

The species is dioecious (unisexual) with male and female flowers on different individual trees. The inflorescences are terminal, branched, panicles about 12–20 cm long, on stout peduncles, holding rusty tomentose buds and yellow or yellowish-white flowers. The male flowers are 7 mm across, with 4 tepals (2 mm) and ovate containing many stamens (filaments to 3 mm). Female flowers are 5 mm across and with 4 tepals (2 mm). The ovary is tomentose, often 4-loculed, and the style, often 4 (or 5), is about 3 mm long and feathery. The fruiting pedicel is about 5 mm long attached to a fruit (1 cm in diameter) which is a depressed roundish capsule covered in gray tomentose and softly spiny stellate hairs. The seeds (ca. 5 mm) are blackish brown, rounded and wedge shaped (angular).

== Taxonomy ==
The following are recognized as synonyms of Mallotus tetracoccus: Mallotus albus var. occidentalis Hook.f., Mallotus ferrugineus (Roxb.) Müll.Arg., Rottlera ferruginea Roxb., and Rottlera tetracocca Roxb.

== Local names ==
The species is known in several languages across its range, including (in alphabetical order of the language): Loru-bondha/Morolia (Assamese), Marleya (Bengali), Laidolor biphang (Bodo), Ilikambo (Idu Mishmi), Uppale (Kannada), Upper Myanmar: Petwaing, Bu kenda (බූ කැන්ද; Sinhala), Mullupolavu, Vatta (Tamil), Thavatta/Vatta/Vattakkumbil/Kazhuvakkaradi/Porivatta (Malayalam).

== Distribution and habitat ==
The species occurs in India (Northeast India and South India), Sri Lanka, Upper Myanmar, Nepal, Bhutan, Bangladesh (Chittagong Hill Tracts), Thailand, and south-central China. Within the Western Ghats of India, it is distributed from the Konkan southwards in semi-evergreen to evergreen and shola forests, from the plains to about 1600 m elevation. It also occurs in peninsular hills such as the Shevaroy Hills and Kollimalai Hills of southern India in evergreen and secondary forests. In northern India, Brandis notes the species is distributed in the outer ranges and valleys of the Sikkim Himalaya ascending to 3,000 feet (914 m), common in second growth forest. In Sri Lanka, it is common in the moist low country.

== Ecology ==
Mallotus tetracoccus is a pioneer or early-successional or early-secondary tree species more common in forest edges, clearings, and secondary forests than in mature forest interiors. Ecophysiological studies indicate that Mallotus tetracoccus shows higher quantum use efficiency of photosynthetic system (F_{V}/F_{M}) at higher light conditions, with F_{V}/F_{M} values of 0.7407, 0.8140, 0.8020, and 0.7825 at light regimes of 10%, 25%, 50%, and 100%, respectively. Similarly, the species also shows higher relative growth rate (RGR, mg g^{−1} day^{−1}) in higher light conditions, with RGR values under 10%, 25%, 50%, and 100% light regimes being 5.38, 30.01, 47.38, and 50.02, respectively. The combination of high quantum use efficiency of photosynthetic system and relative growth rates under higher light conditions, similar in pattern to other pioneer species such as Macaranga peltata, indicate the early-successional nature of Mallotus tetracoccus. Adults and saplings are also known to occur in the understorey of Eucalyptus plantations in the Western Ghats.

As a dioecious species, a male-biased flowering sex ratio (male: female = 1.73) was reported among trees in a 20 ha plot of tropical forest at Xishuangbanna National Nature Reserve in Yunnan, south-west China. In tropical wet evergreen forests of the southern Western Ghats, India, the tree has been reported to be an edge or gap species whose fruits are consumed and seeds are dispersed by birds. The species has also been noted a wind-pollinated species showing diurnal anthesis. The flowers and seeds of Mallotus tetracoccus are reported as consumed by lion-tailed macaques in a tropical rainforest fragment in the Anaimalai hills, India.

== Uses ==
The leaves are used in sericulture. The plant is known for its medicinal properties in Ayurvedic and in folk/traditional medicine. Bark and gum of the tree is used for treating fractures and venereal diseases. Also used as firewood in some parts.

== Gallery ==
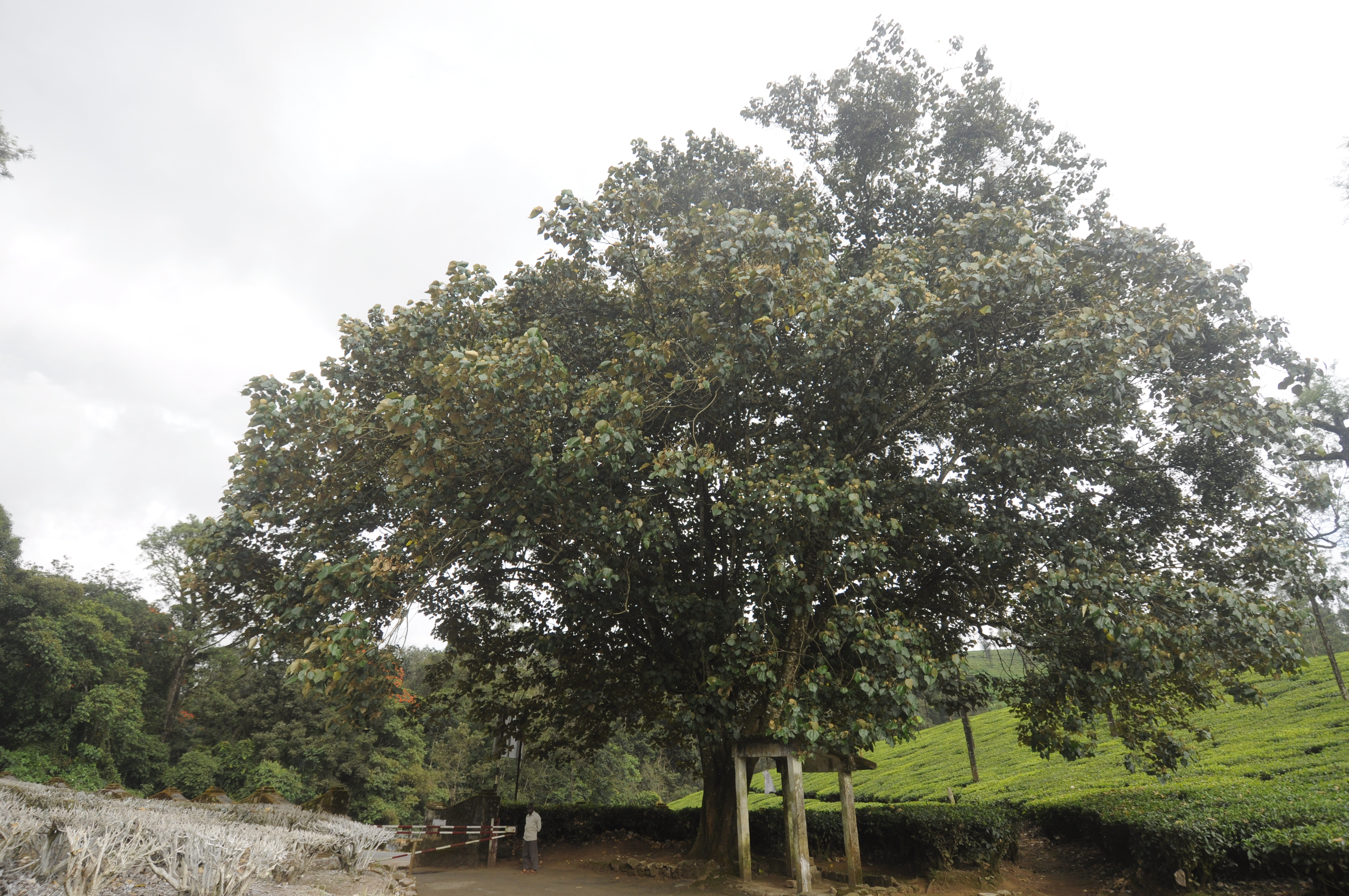
Tree (male) and branching pattern in the open

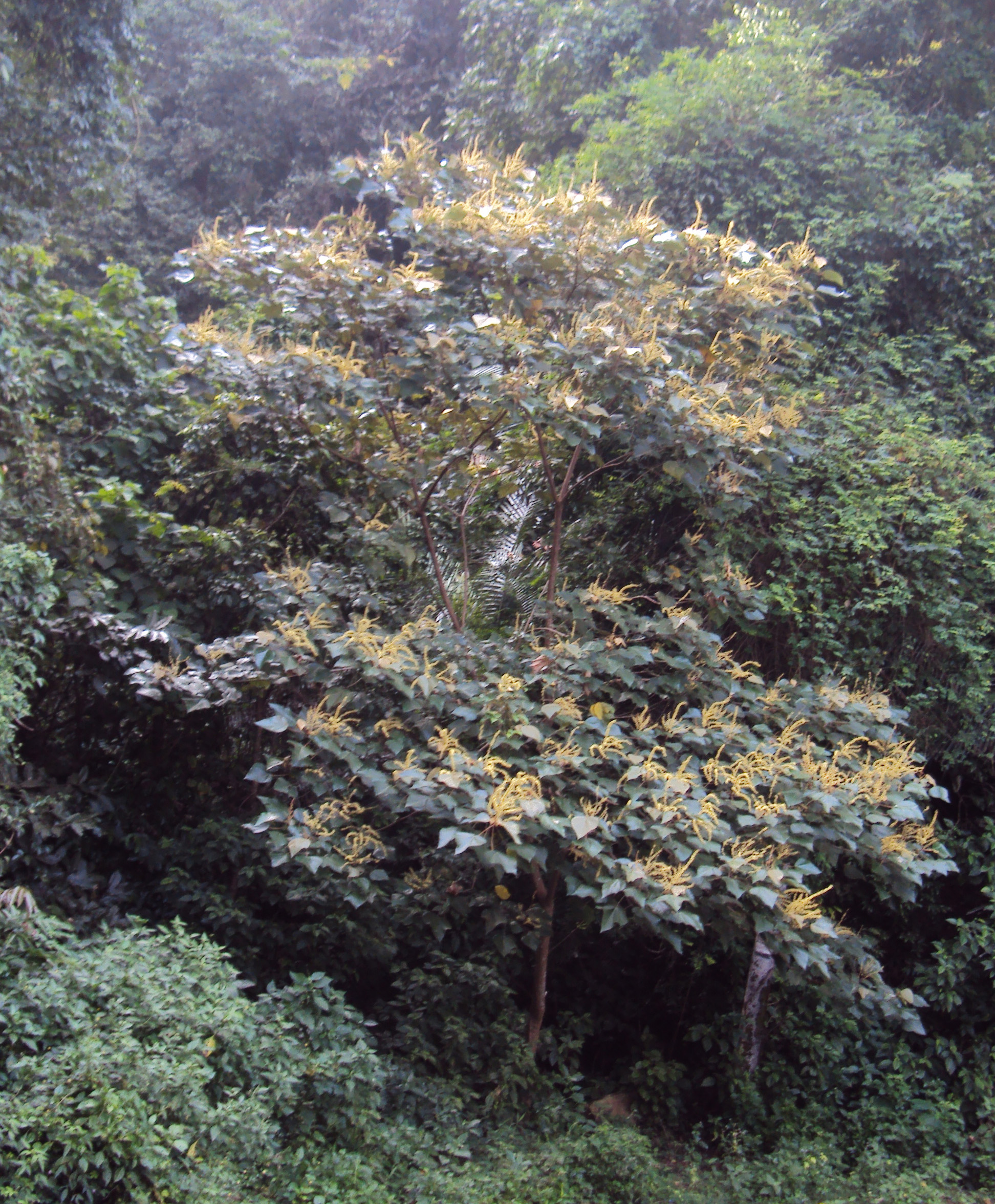
Tree at forest edge

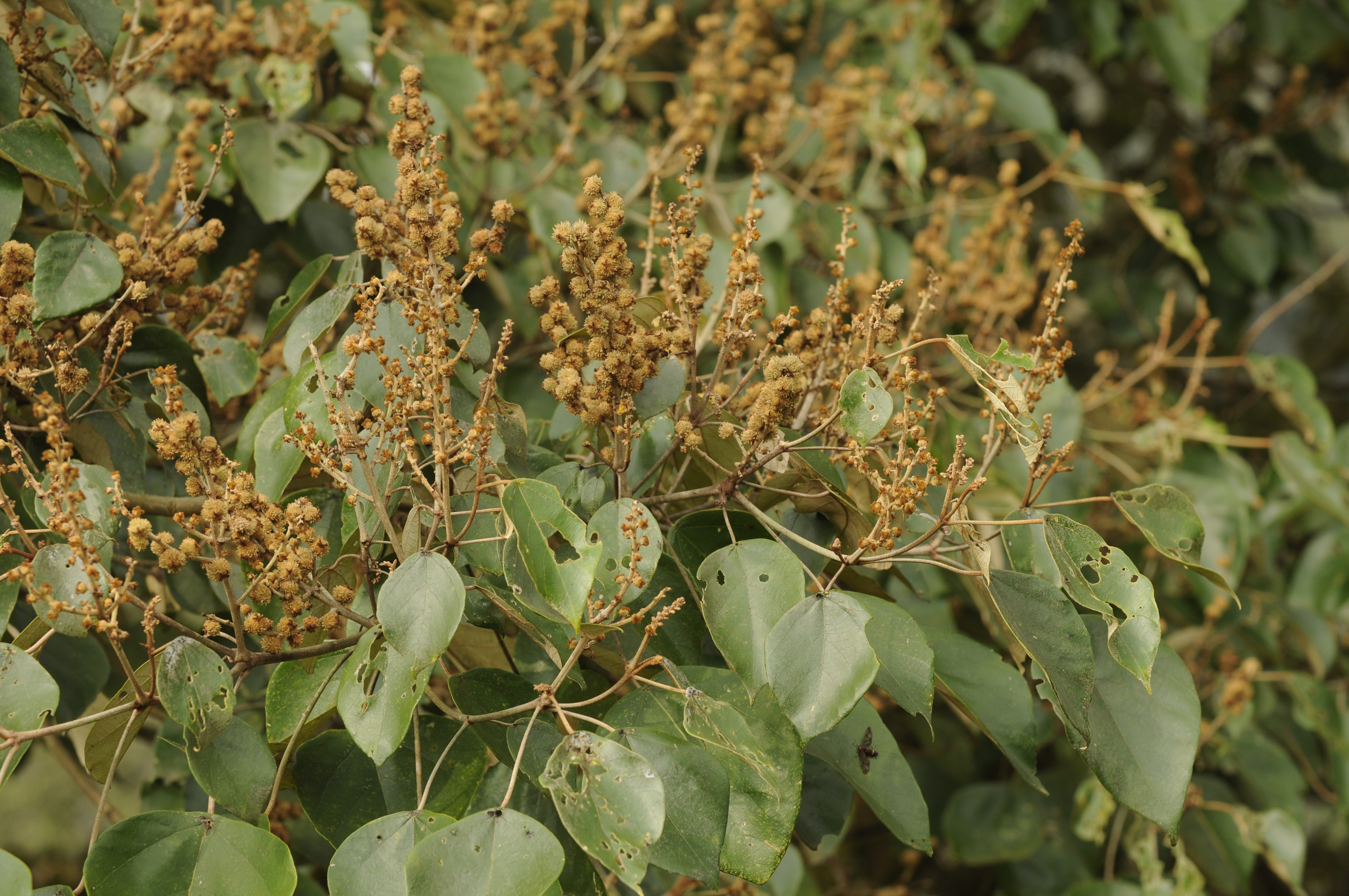
Fruiting branches

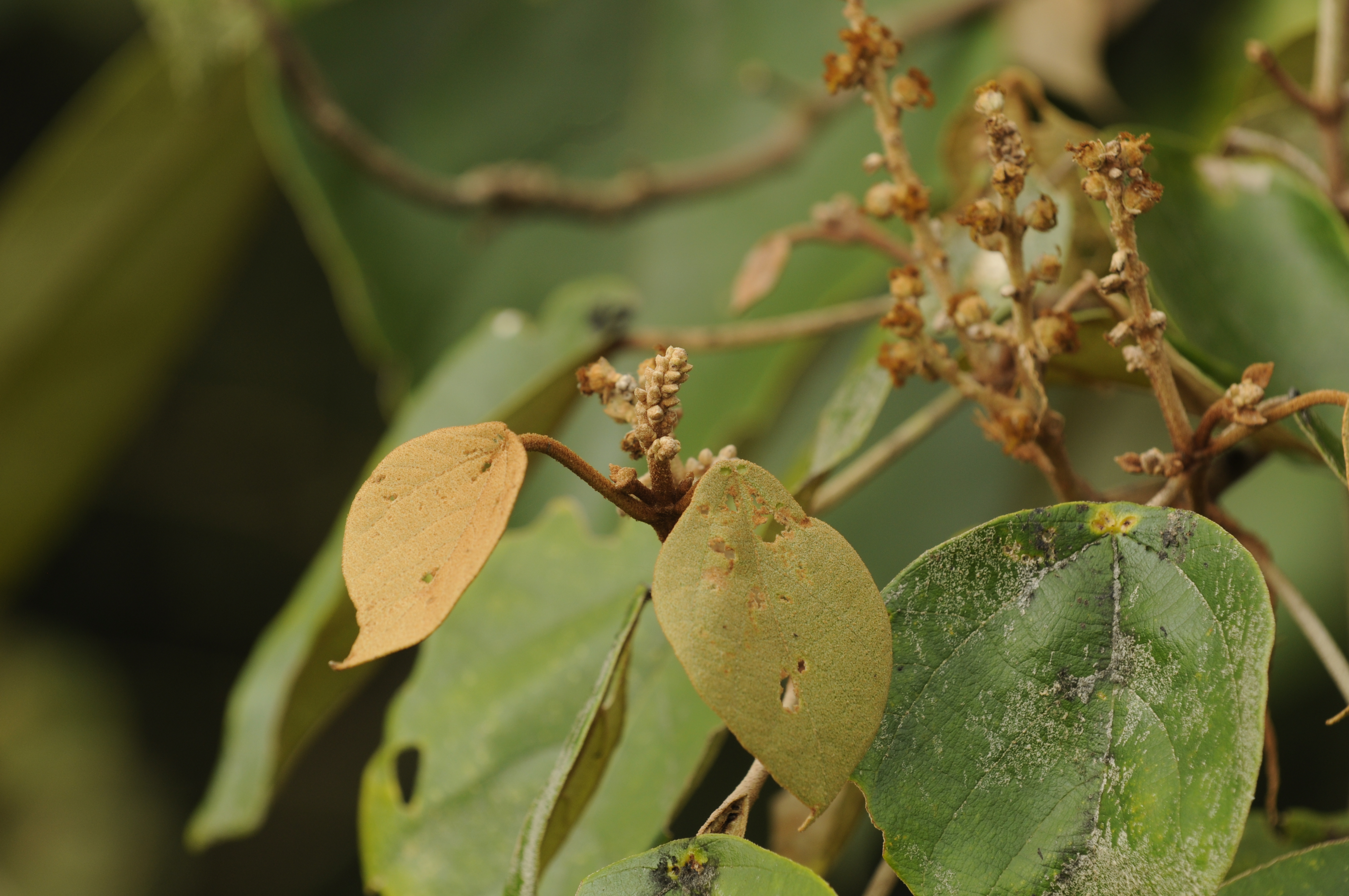
Young leaf, buds, and fruits

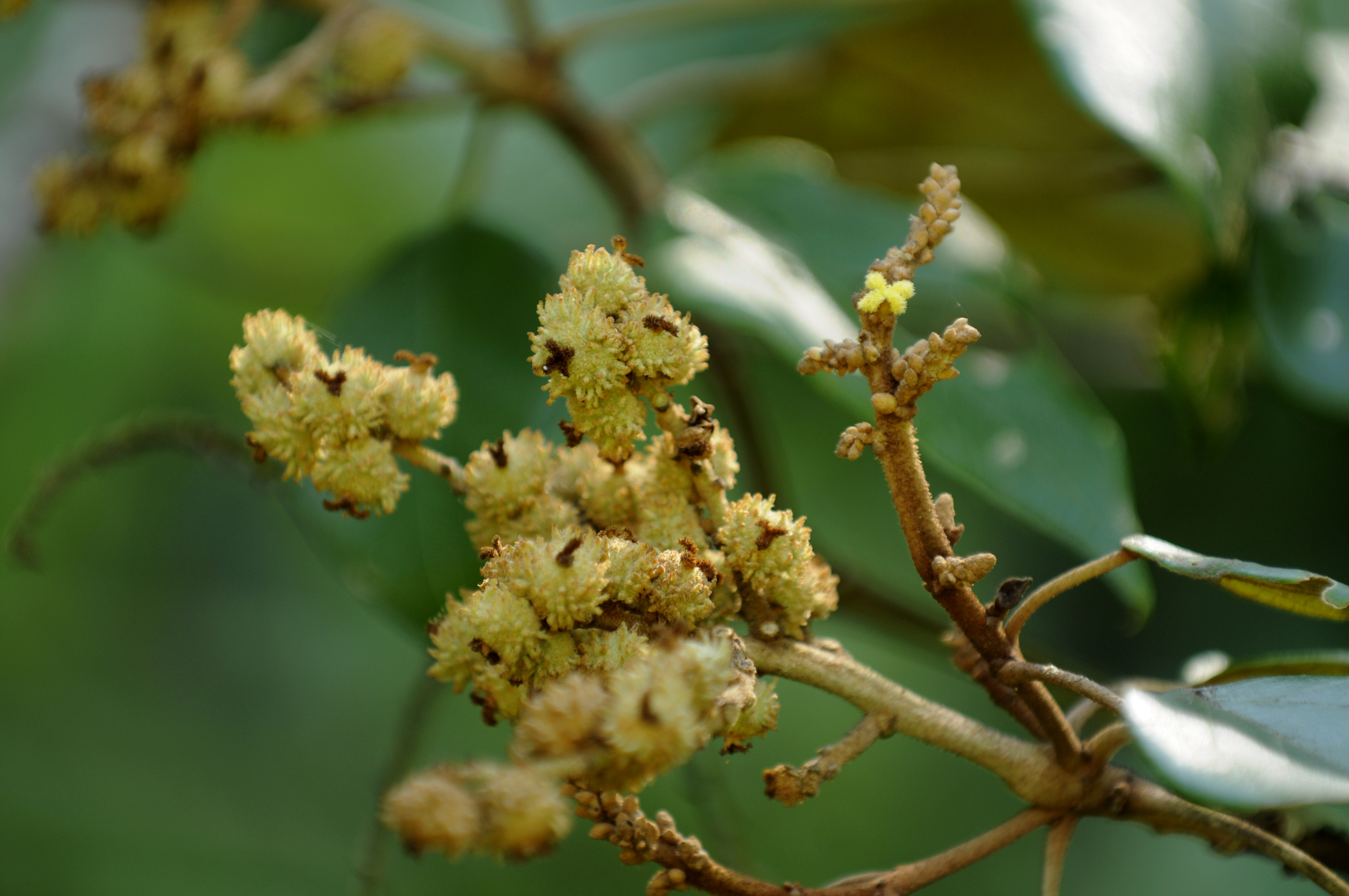
Fruits (left), female flower (right)

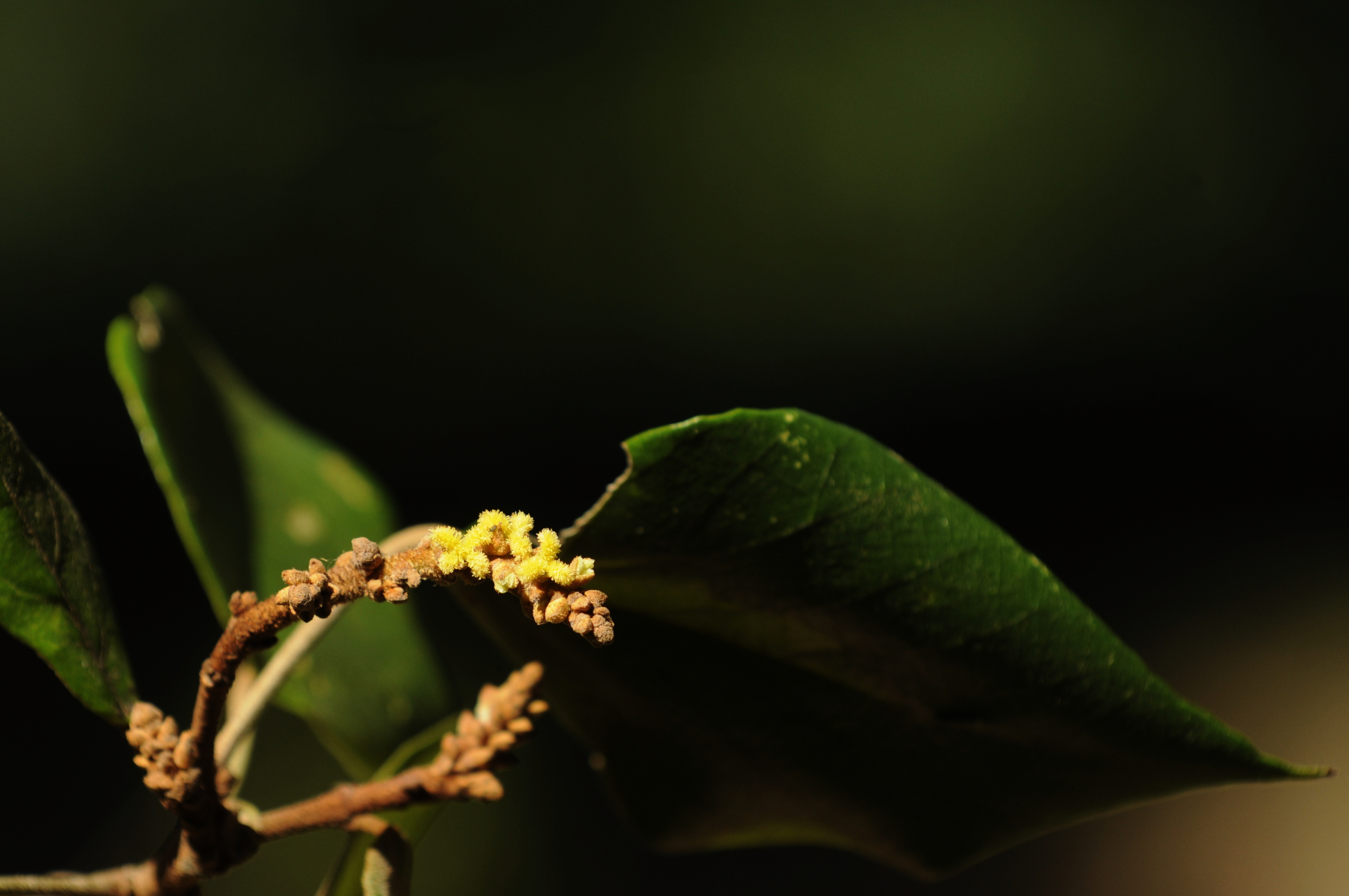
Female flower

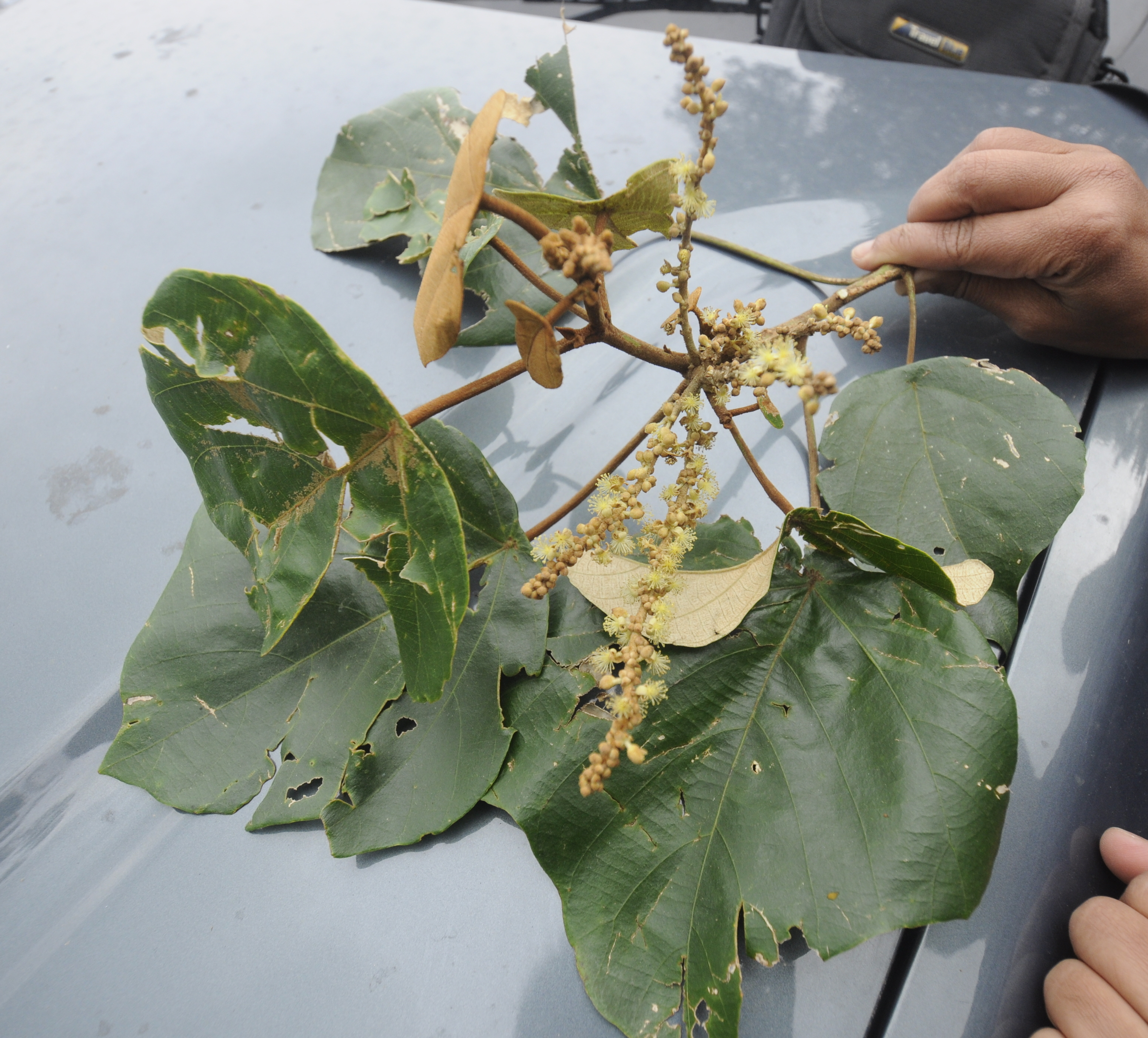
Twig and male flowers

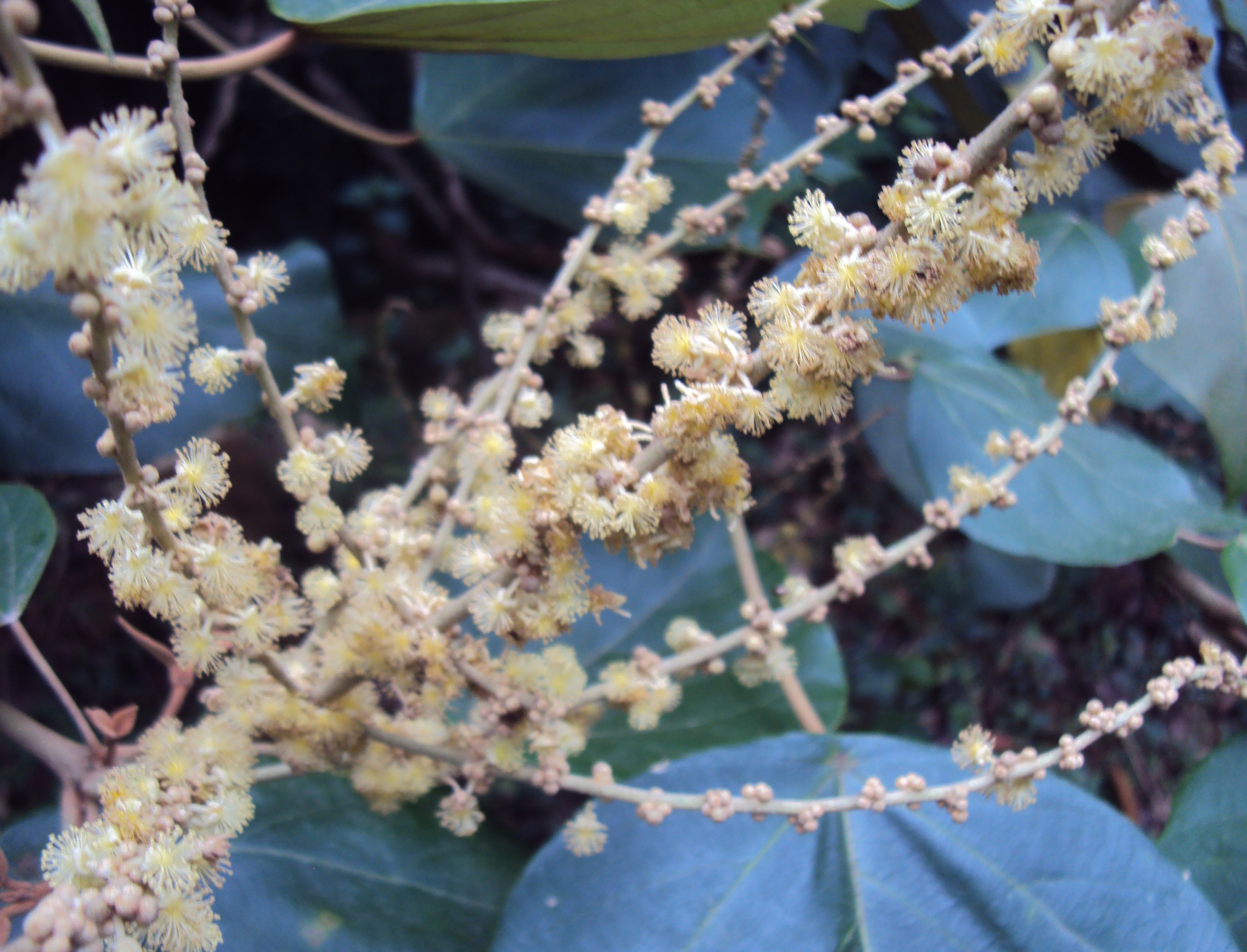
Male flowers

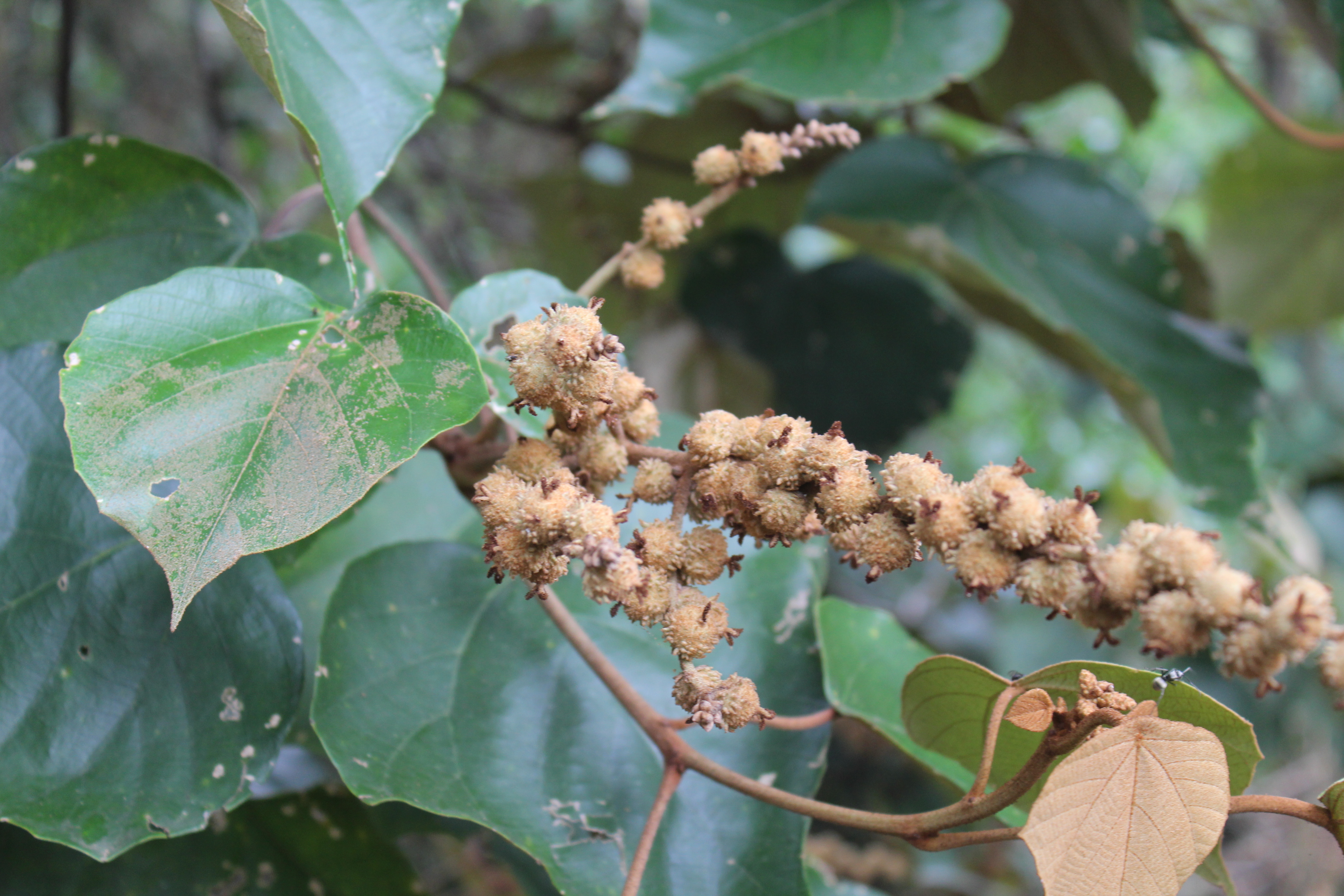
Fruits and leaves

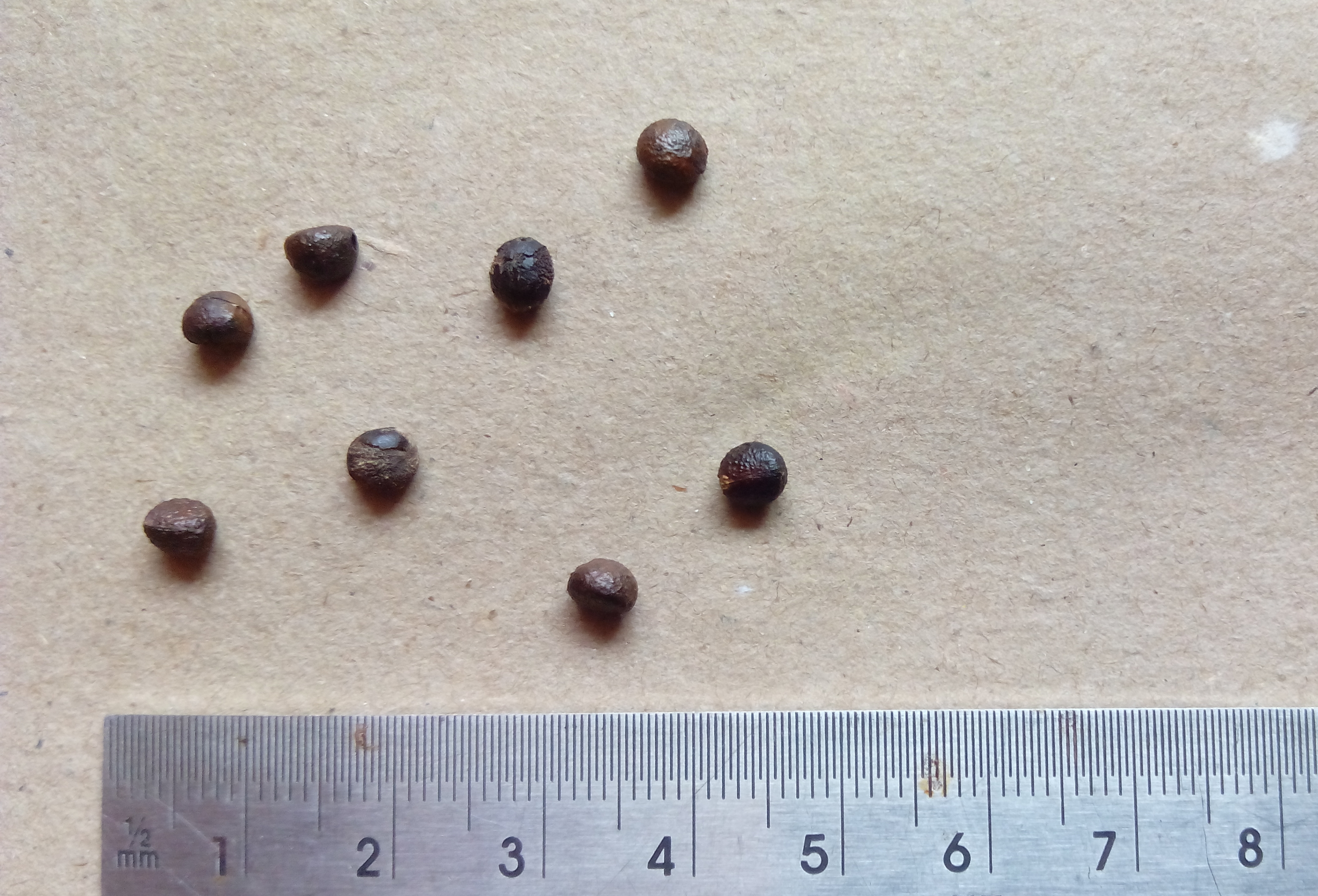
Seeds of Mallotus tetracoccus
