= Kolli Hills block =

Kolli Hills block is a revenue block in the Namakkal district of Tamil Nadu, India. It has a total of 14 panchayat villages.

Semmedu village is the headquarters for the Kolli Hills block.
