= Agaya Gangai =

Waterfall in India

Agaya Gangai Falls
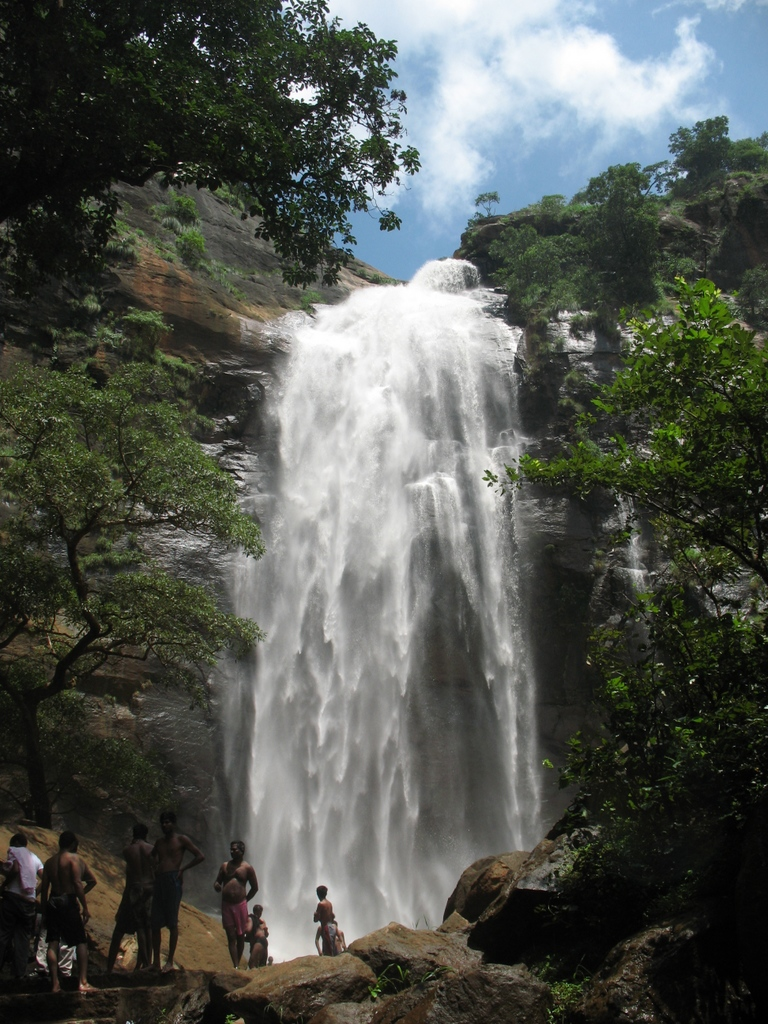
- Interactive map of Agaya Gangai Falls
- Coordinates: 11°16′1″N 78°23′38″E
- Total height: 300 ft (91 m)
- Watercourse: Aiyaru river

Agaya Gangai (English: Ganges of sky) is a waterfall located in Kolli Hills of the Eastern Ghats, in Namakkal district, Tamil Nadu, India. It falls from a height of 300 feet (91 m) and is formed by the Aiyaru river. Agaya Gangai is also known as Peraruvi and can be reached by climbing down 1196 steps. The caves of sages Bogar, Agastyar, Korakkar and Kalangi Nathar are located near the waterfalls inside the forest. Agaya Gangai dwarf gecko is a species of diurnal, rock-dwelling, insectivorous gecko endemic to the region.

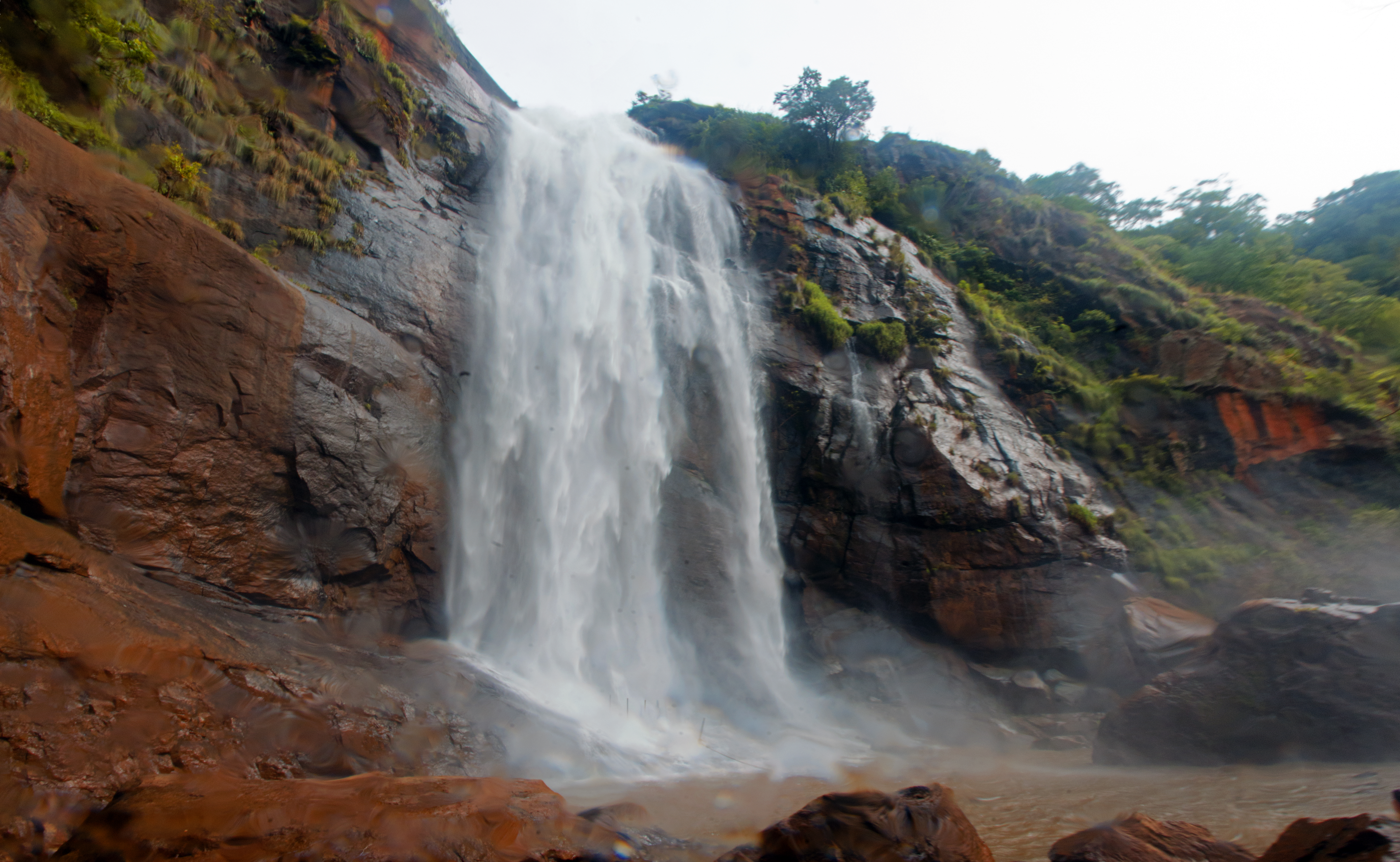
waterfall basin

== See also ==
- List of waterfalls
- List of waterfalls in India
