= Aiyaru River =

Coordinates: 11.008748°N 78.531003°E

- Location within Tamil Nadu Location within India

Aiyaru is a river flowing in the Namakkal district of the Indian state of Tamil Nadu.

== See also ==
- List of rivers of Tamil Nadu
