= Hemidactylus kolliensis =

Scientific classification
- Kingdom: Animalia
- Phylum: Chordata
- Class: Reptilia
- Order: Squamata
- Suborder: Gekkota
- Family: Gekkonidae
- Genus: Hemidactylus
- Species: H. kolliensis

Binomial name
- Hemidactylus kolliensis Agarwal, Bauer, Giri, & Khandekar, 2019

Species of lizard

Hemidactylus kolliensis, the Kolli rock gecko is a species of gecko. It is endemic to India.
