= Masi periasamy =

Shiva temple in Tiruvarur district, Tamil Nadu, India

Masi Periyannasamy
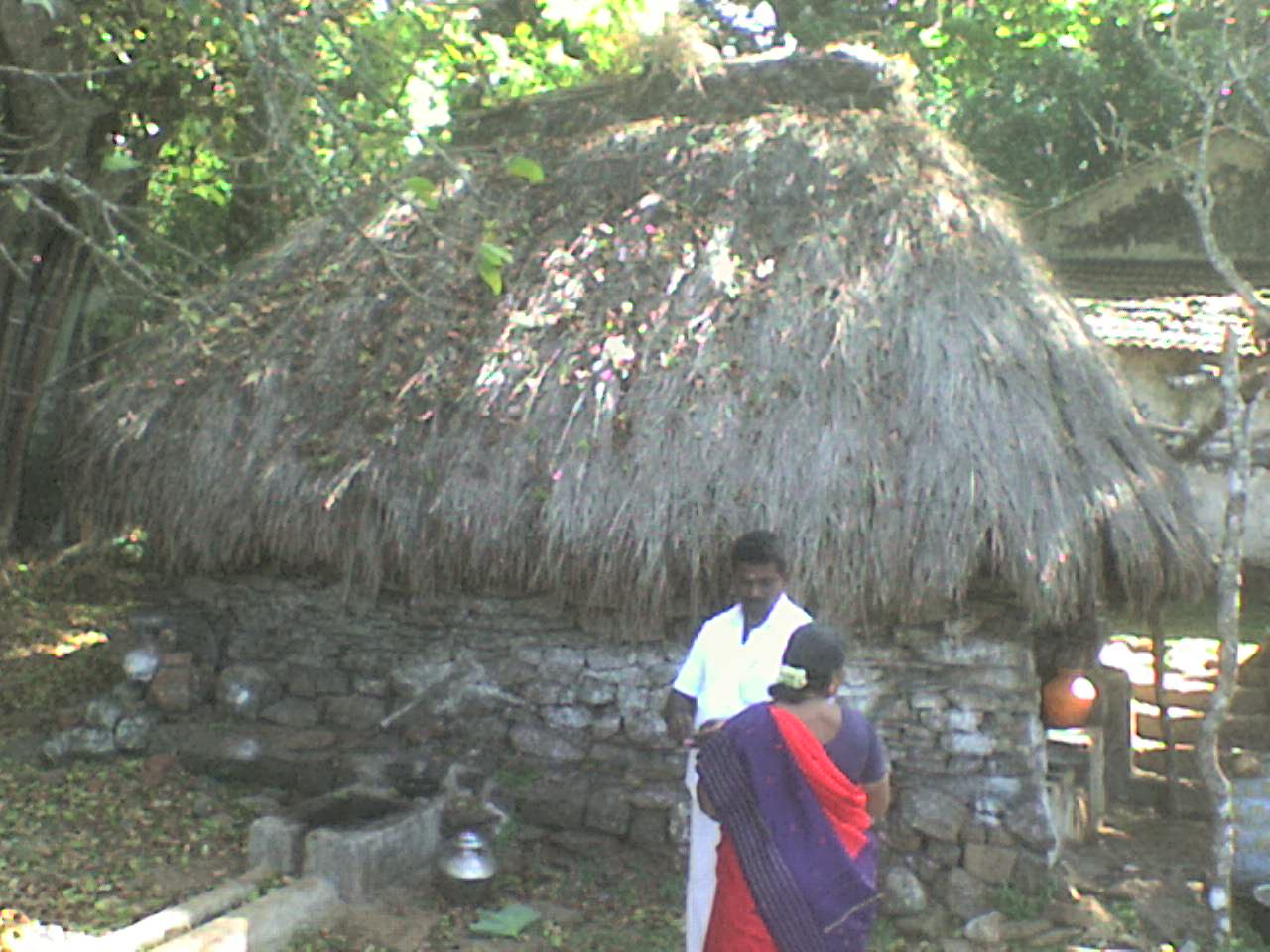
- Masi periyasamy temple kollimalai

- Maasi Periyasamy Temple, Kollimalai, Namakkal district, Tamil Nadu

Religion
- Affiliation: Hinduism
- District: Namakkal
- Deity: Lord Masi periasamy,

Location
- Location: Kollimalai
- State: Tamil Nadu
- Country: India
- Coordinates: 10.7537°N 79.6369°E

Architecture
- Type: Dravidian architecture
- Elevation: 37.64 m (123 ft)

Masi Periyannasamy, also known as Kollimalai Masi Periasamy, is a deity and kuladevam of the Hindu people.
