= Mullukkurichi =

Village in Tamil Nadu, India

Mullukurichi
- Village
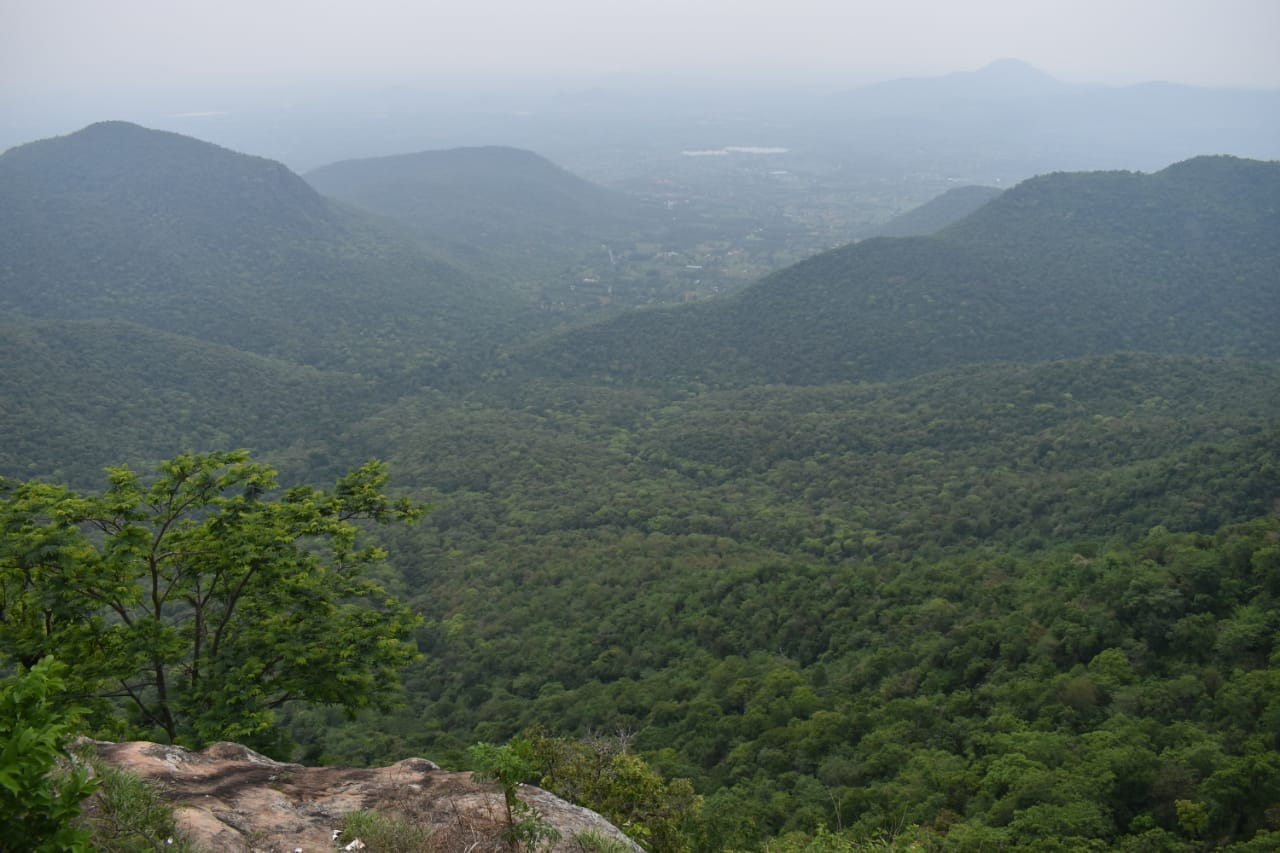

- Location in Tamil Nadu, India Mullukurichi (India)
- Coordinates: 11°26′50″N 78°24′08″E
- Country: India
- State: Tamil Nadu
- District: Namakkal
- Taluk: Rasipuram

Languages
  - Official: Tamil
- Time zone: UTC+5:30 (IST)
- PIN: 637402
- Vehicle registration: TN 88

Mullukkurichi is a village of Rasipuram Taluk, Namakkal district, in the Indian state of Tamil Nadu.
