= Kalappanaickenpatti =

- Nagar Panchayat
- Nickname: k.n.patti
- Location in Tamil Nadu, India
- Coordinates: 11°20′16″N 78°14′32″E
- Country: India
- State: Tamil Nadu
- District: Namakkal
- Taluk: Senthamangalam

Government
  - Type: Panchayat Town

Population (2011)
  - Total: 10,831

Languages
  - Official: Tamil
- Time zone: UTC+5:30 (IST)
- PIN: 637404

Kalappanaickenpatti is a Town in now part of the town of Senthamangalam in Namakkal district in the Indian state of Tamil Nadu

== Climate ==
Kalappanaickenpatti mostly has a hot climate all over the year except during winter season for some hours of the day. The town experiences very hot climate during Jan-May.

== Demographics ==
At the 2011 India census, Kalappanaickenpatti had a population of 10,831. Males constitute 50% of the population and females 50%. Kalappanaickenpatti has an average literacy rate of 62%, higher than the national average of 59.5%: male literacy is 72%, and female literacy is 53%. In Kalappanaickenpatti, 8% of the population is under 6 years of age. Most Population of Parkavakula Udayar and also Telugu community like KAVARA NAIDU and kongu velalar goundar is the dominant communities and also Telugu Arunthathiyar, Telugu Chettiars, Vanniyars, dalits also in sizable number .

=== Festival ===
This town has two temples Mahendra Medhara with the goddess name Yellamal and Nanjai Nathamanar mariyamman temple that celebrates the yearly festival in the month Feb/March and Pudur Mariamman temple festival celebrated two years once was grand.The Temple car will around the inside the village.

== Transport ==
Kalappanaickenpatti is located 17 km northeast from Namakkal on State Highway SH-95 (connecting Mohanur-Namakkal-Muthugapatti-Akkiampatty-Sendamangalam-Kalappanaickenpatty, Rasipuram, 54 km long). The nearest cities from kalappanaickenpatti are Namakkal (17 km), Karur (50 km), Salem (45 km), Erode (66 km), and Tiruchirapalli (95 km). Chennai, the capital of the state, is 375 km from Namakkal. The nearest airport is in Salem(45 km). The nearest major railway station is at Namakkal (17 km).

bus facilities town buses from namakkal are 14, 14a, 14b, 14c and these with more privates buses one in 10mins

== Education ==
Kalappanaickenpatti has a Government Higher secondary school for both boys and girls and have some more matriculation schools.

== Economy ==
The major income for this village is agricultural, including poultry farms, and its associated services, such as lorry transport.

== Villages in Kalappanaickenpatti panchayat ==
Nanjundapuram (near by boys Government school), kalappanaickenpatti pudur, sutta paarai medu, viyalan santahi,
