= Pattinam =

Pattinam Pattanam
- Town
- Location in Tamil Nadu, India
- Coordinates: 10.8658°N 79.8325°E
- Country: India
- State: Tamil Nadu
- District: Namakkal

Area
  - Total: 5.63 km^{2} (2.17 sq mi)

Population (2011)
  - Total: 8,912
  - Density: 1,580/km^{2} (4,100/sq mi)

Languages
  - Official: Tamil
- Time zone: UTC+5:30 (IST)

Pattinam or Pattanam is a panchayat town in Rasipuram taluk of Namakkal district in the Indian state of Tamil Nadu. Spread across an area of 5.63 km^{2} (2.17 sq mi), the town panchayat is divided into 15 wards. It had a population of 8,912 as per the 2011 census.

== Geography and administration ==
Pattinam is a town panchayat in Rasipuram taluk of Namakkal district in the Indian state of Tamil Nadu. It is located approximately 30 km (19 mi) from Namakkal. The town panchayat covers an area of 5.63 km^{2} (2.17 sq mi) and is divided into 15 wards and 18 streets. The town panchayat experiences a dry and moderate climate with low rainfall.

The panchayat administration is headed by a chairman and is responsible for providing basic services including maintenance of roads, water supply, health and sanitation. Pattinam forms part of the Rasipuram Assembly constituency of the Tamil Nadu Legislative Assembly and the Namakkal Lok Sabha constituency.

== Demographics ==
According to the 2011 census, Pattinam had a population of 8,912 across 2,412 households. The population consisted of 4,514 males and 4,398 females. About 812 (9.1%) of the population were children aged less than six years. The town panchayat had a literacy rate of approximately 72.2%, with male literacy at 79.8% and female literacy at 64.4%. Scheduled Castes accounted for approximately 48.8% of the population, while Scheduled Tribes accounted for less than 0.1%. The working population constituted approximately 51.7% of the total population, comprising 4,608 workers, of whom 2,805 were males and 1,803 were females. Of the total working population, 98.1% were engaged in main work, while 1.9% were engaged in marginal work.

As per the 2011 census, Hinduism was the predominant religion, practiced by 99.02% of the population, followed by Christianity (0.61%), Islam (0.13%), and others (0.03%) with approximately 0.20% reporting no religion. The town panchayat has four Hindu temples. The annual festival dedicated to Mariamman is celebrated in February and the annual festival for Ayyanar is held in April. The Ayyanar festival attracts thousands from the nearby villages.

== Economy ==
The town panchayat contains red and clay soils. The fertile soils support agriculture, which is the major occupation, with nearly 97% of the working population engaged in agriculture and allied activities. Other commercial activities include poultry farming.

== Transport ==
Pattinam is located on the road connecting Rasipuram and R. Pudupatti. The nearest railway station is the Rasipuram railway station located approximately 4 km (2.5 mi) away and the nearest airport is the Salem Airport.
