= Pavithiram =

Town in Namakkal district, Tamil Nadu, India

- Town
- Location in Tamil Nadu, India
- Coordinates: 11°08′29″N 78°21′49″E
- Country: India
- State: Tamil Nadu
- District: Namakkal
- Taluk: Senthamangalam

Population (2011)
  - Total: 8,172

Languages
  - Official: Tamil
- Time zone: UTC+5:30 (IST)

Pavithiram is a Town in Senthamangalam Taluk, Namakkal district of Tamil Nadu state in India, located 1.5 km from both Varagur and Pavithrampudur, 8 km from Erumaipatti and 9 km from Thathaiyangarpet.

== Demographics ==
As of 2011, the village was home to 915 people and 271 households.

The literacy rate is 64.7%; 72.97% of men and 56.9% of women are literate.

== Politics ==
The sarpanch (head of village) is elected every five years.
