= Kasthuripatti =

Village in Tamil Nadu, India

- Neighbourhood
- Kasthuripatti, Namakkal district, Tamil Nadu
- Coordinates: 11°08′32″N 78°20′01″E
- Country: India
- State: Tamil Nadu
- District: Namakkal
- Elevation: 191.17 m (627.2 ft)

Languages
  - Official: Tamil, English
  - Speech: Tamil, English
- Time zone: UTC+5:30 (IST)
- PIN: 637021
- Vehicle registration: TN - 88 ** xxxx
- Other Neighbourhoods: Varagur, Erumaipatti, Pavithiram, Thathaiyangarpet
- LS: Namakkal
- VS: Senthamangalam

Kasthuripatti is a village in salem district, Tamil Nadu, India. It is located between sankagiri and kozhikalnatham.

== Location ==
Kasthuripatti is located with the geographic coordinates of (11.1418°N 78.3323°E) near Varagur.

Kasthuripatti (Tamil Nadu)

== Details ==
- This village serves as the eastern border of Namakkal district. The adjacent district is Thiruchirappalli.
- It is the birthplace of Cinema director Babu Yogeswaran. He has directed the film Daas.
- The southern part of Kolli Hills is located at a distance of just 5 km from this village.
- This place having the pincode of 637021 as under Varagur S.O
- The temple of Ambayiramman is located just 1 km away. This temple figures in the opening of the title card of the Tamil film Bama Vijayam.
- Varagur is the native place of cinema director M. Saravanan. He is the director of the film Engaeyum Eppothum.
