= State Highway 161 (Tamil Nadu) =

Road in Tamil Nadu, India

State Highway 161

Route information
- Maintained by Highways and Minor Ports Department
- Length: 45.42 km (28.22 mi)

Major junctions
- From: Namakkal, Namakkal district, Tamil Nadu
- To: Kannanur, Tiruchirappalli district, Tamil Nadu

Location
- Country: India
- State: Tamil Nadu
- Districts: Namakkal and Tiruchirappalli

Highway system
- Roads in India; Expressways; National; State; Asian; State Highways in Tamil Nadu

Tamil Nadu State Highway 161 (SH-161) is a State Highway maintained by the Highways Department of Government of Tamil Nadu. It connects Namakkal with Kannanur in Tamil Nadu.

== Route ==
The total length of the SH-161 is 45.42 kilometres (28.22 mi). The route is from Namakkal – Kannanur, via Erumaipatti, Varagur and Thathaiyangarpet.

== See also ==
- Highways of Tamil Nadu
