= R. Pudupatti =

R. Pudupatti R. Pudupatty
- Panchayat Town
- Location in Tamil Nadu, India
- Coordinates: 11°30′27″N 78°16′30″E
- Country: India
- State: Tamil Nadu
- District: Namakkal

Area
  - Total: 17.2 km^{2} (6.6 sq mi)

Population (2011)
  - Total: 7,478
  - Density: 435/km^{2} (1,130/sq mi)

Languages
  - Official: Tamil
- Time zone: UTC+5:30 (IST)
- PIN: 637407
- Telephone code: 914287
- Vehicle registration: TN-28

R. Pudupatti or R. Pudupatty is a panchayat town in Rasipuram taluk of Namakkal district in the Indian state of Tamil Nadu. It is located about 41 km (25 mi) from Namakkal. Spread across an area of 17.2 km^{2} (6.6 sq mi), the town panchayat is divided into 15 wards. It had a population of 7,478 as per the 2011 census.

== Geography and administration ==
R. Pudupatti is a town panchayat in Rasipuram taluk of Namakkal district in the Indian state of Tamil Nadu. It is located approximately 41 km (25 mi) from Namakkal. The town panchayat covers an area of 17.2 km^{2} (6.6 sq mi) and is divided into 15 wards and 31 streets.

The town panchayat is classified as a second grade (Grade - II) town panchayat (annual revenue between ₹ 1 to 5 million), and the panchayat administration is responsible for providing basic services including maintenance of roads, water supply, health and sanitation. In 2025, the state government executed several infrastructure projects including the a drinking water scheme, and construction of new sewage tanks. Pudupatti forms part of the Rasipuram Assembly constituency of the Tamil Nadu Legislative Assembly and the Namakkal Lok Sabha constituency.

== Demographics and economy ==
According to the 2011 census, R. Pudupatti had a population of 7,478 across 2,105 households. The population consisted of 3,781 males and 3,697 females. About 664 (8.9%) of the population were children aged less than six years. The town panchayat had a literacy rate of approximately 69.6%, with male literacy at 77.9% and female literacy at 61.2%. Scheduled Castes accounted for approximately 31.6% of the population, while Scheduled Tribes accounted for 3.4%. The working population constituted approximately 62.8% of the total population, comprising 4,698 workers, of whom 2,489 were males and 2,209 were females. Of the total working population, 95.4% were engaged in main work, while 4.6% were engaged in marginal work.

As per the 2011 census, Hinduism was the predominant religion, practiced by 99.6% of the population, followed by Islam (0.2%) and Christianity (0.1%). The town panchayat has a Hindu temple dedicated to Mariamman and the annual car festival is celebrated in April.

== Transport ==
R. Pudupatti is connected by road to Rasipuram located approximately 13 km (8.1 mi) away. The nearest railway station is the Rasipuram railway station and the nearest airport is the Coimbatore International Airport.
