= Akkiyampatty =

- Neighborhood
- Neighborhood In Senthamangalam
- Location in Tamil Nadu, India Akkiyampatty (India)
- Coordinates: 11°15′58″N 78°13′59″E
- Country: India
- State: Tamil Nadu
- District: Namakkal
- Taluk: Senthamangalam
- Elevation: 240 m (790 ft)

Languages
  - Official: Tamil
- Time zone: UTC+5:30 (IST)
- PIN: 637409
- Telephone code: 91-4286
- Vehicle registration: TN-28, TN-88

Akkiyampatty is a neighbourhood in the Town of Senthamangalam in the Indian state of Tamil Nadu. It was merged with the Senthamangalam Municipality in 2016 .

== Geography ==
Akkiyampatty is located near Sendamangalam which is exactly 1 km apart from the village. It has an average elevation of 240 metres (715 feet). It is close to Kolli Hills which is part of the Eastern Ghats. The closest river is Kaveri. The village is approximately 350 km southwest of Chennai, 255 km south of Bangalore, 50 km south of Salem and 93 km northwest of Tiruchirapalli (Trichy).

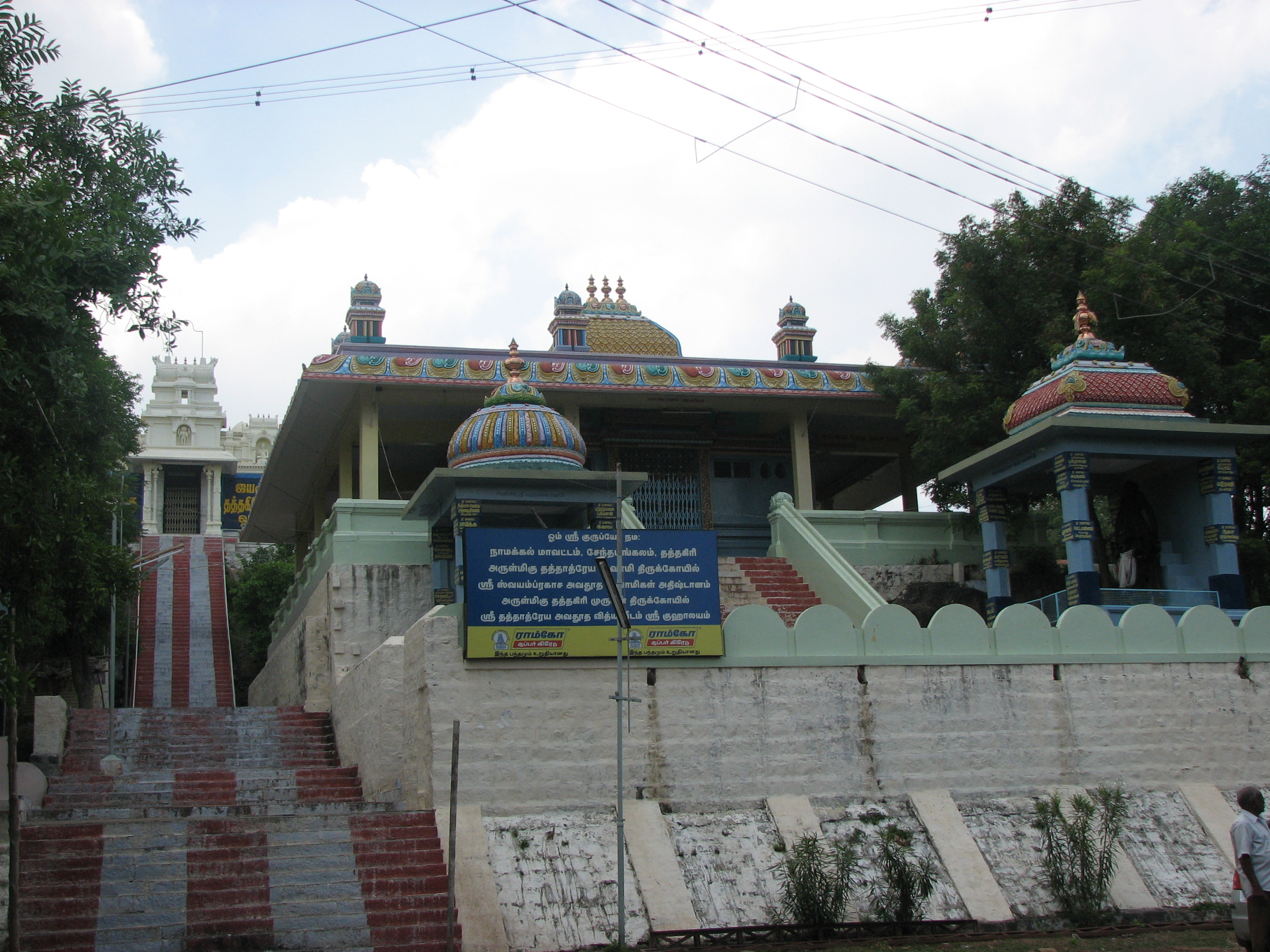
Thathagiri Murugan

== Transport ==
Akkiyampatty is located 10 km northeast from Namakkal on State Highway SH-95 (connecting Mohanur-Namakkal-Muthugapatti-Akkiyampatty-Sendamangalam-Gandhipuram-Kalappanaickenpatty, Rasipuram, 54 km long). The nearest towns from Akkiyampatty are Namakkal (10 km), Karur (45 km), Salem (50 km), Erode (62 km), and Tiruchirapalli (93 km). Chennai, the capital of the state, is 380 km from Namakkal. The nearest airport is in Salem (55 km). The nearest major railway station is at Namakkal (9 km).

== Demographics ==
As of 2011 census, the village had a total population of 5038 with 2456 males and 2582 females. The overall literacy recorded was 72.33%.
