= Mohanur block =

Mohanur block is a revenue block in the Namakkal district of Tamil Nadu, India. It has a total of 25 panchayat villages.

== List of Panchayat in Mohanur Block ==
1. Andapuram
2. Aniyapuram
3. Arasanatham
4. Ariyur
5. Aroor
6. Chinna Pethampatti
7. Kalipalayam
8. Komaripalayam
9. K.Pudupalayam
10. Kumarapalayam
11. Lathuvadi
12. Madakasampatti
13. Manapalli
14. Nanjai Edayar
15. N.Pudupatti
16. Olapalayam
17. Oruvandur
18. Parali
19. Peramandampalayam
20. Pettapalayam
21. Rasipalayam
22. Sengapalli
23. S.Valavanthi
24. Tholur
25. Valayappatti
