= Varagur =

Neighbourhood in Namakkal district, Tamil Nadu, India

- Varagur gram panchayat
- Nickname: Varagoor
- Location of Varagur in Tamil Nadu
- Coordinates: 11°09′N 78°21′E
- Country: India
- State: Tamil Nadu
- Region: Kongu Nadu
- District: Namakkal
- Revenue block: Erumaipatti block
- Taluk: Senthamangalam
- Established: 1847

Government
  - Type: Gram Panchayat
  - Body: Varagur gram panchayat
  - Panchayat Head: Santhi Jeyagobi

Area
  - Total: 11.4019 km^{2} (4.4023 sq mi)
- Elevation: 218 m (715 ft)

Population (2011)
  - Total: 8,145
  - Density: 714.4/km^{2} (1,850/sq mi)
- Demonym: Varagooraans
- Time zone: UTC+5:30 (IST)
- PIN: 637021 (Varagur S.O)
- Telephone code: 91 - 04286
- Vehicle registration: TN-88(Namakkal South)
- Official language: Tamil
- Website: www.varagur.nkl.tn.nic.in

Varagur is a village in Senthamangalam Taluk, Namakkal district of Tamil Nadu state. Erumaipatti is 7 kilometers and Thathaiyangarpet is 9 kilometers away from the village. The Varagur village is located in the state Tamil Nadu having state code 33 and having the village code 634663. The Namakkal is the district of this village with district code 609. The total geographical area in which this village is expanded in 1,140 hectares (2,800 acres). The village is known for the Varagur Venkatesa Perumal Koil, one of the 108 Abhimana Kshethra temples.

== Demographics ==
According to 2011 census the village has 719 households with the total population 2833, out of which 1402 are male 1431 are female. The total number of children in the age group of 0-6 was 303.

The Varagur village is situated in the Namakkal district with district code number 609. Namakkal is the subdistrict (tehsil / mandal), is a low-level administrative division of a district, of this village, having the sub district code is 05747. Erumaipatti is the Community Development Block (C.D. Block) of this village with C.D. Block code number 0109. The gram panchayat for this village is Varagur, Devarayapuram and its gram panchayat code is 0053, 0034. Namakkal is the Sub-district headquarter of this village and it is situated 14 kilometres away from this village. The district headquarters' name is Namakkal and as per distance concern it is 25 kilometres from the Varagur village.

== Sub villages ==
- Varagur
- Sellipalayam
- Kasthuripatti
- Manikkavelur
- Kanjampatti
- Varagur Colony

== Political landscape ==
As a gram panchayat this village is having 3 wards, and it will be under Senthamangalam (state assembly constituency) of Namakkal (Lok Sabha constituency) in Tamil Nadu Legislative Assembly.

== Literacy ==
Literacy rate of the village is 75%. Male literacy rate is 80% and female literacy rate is 70%. 2134 people out of 2833(the total population of Varagur) are literate.

== Major places ==
Varagur has a Telephone exchange, TNPDCL's Office, India Post-637021 Post office, Primary Health Center, Deputy Health Center, Veterinary Hospital, Milk Saturation center, 1 Government Higher Secondary School, 1 Government Elementary School, 2 private educational institutions, 2 Stone crushers, 3 Anganwadi, 2 Public library, Government Boys Hostel, Marriage Hall, Church, Mosque, Temples, and private clinics.

The total number of households in Varagur village are 2371. It rely on the total population of 8911 people. As far as male population concern the number of population is 4441 of the village Varagur and the total female population number is 4470. The reference taken to publish these data is of year 2009. The source of data is Census of India.

== Sex ratio ==
The sex ratio is the ratio of Varagur males to females in the population of 8911 (normalized to 100). In most sexually reproducing species, the ratio tends to be 1:1 as it is explained by Fisher's principle. The sex ratio of Varagur village is 99.351230425056.

- Total Households = 2371
- Total Population = 8911
- Male Population = 4441
- Female Population = 4470
- Sex Ratio = 99.35%

== Other information ==
- The area of the village is 5.97 square kilometers.
- There are about 819 houses in Varagur.
- As per 2009 stats, Varagur was a gram panchayat.
- Erumaipatti is 5 kilometers and Thathaiyangarpet is 9 kilometers away from the village.
- Varagur is the native place of cinema director M. Saravanan. He is the director of the film Engaeyum Eppothum.
