= Ayilpatty =

- village
- Location in Tamil Nadu, India Ayilpatty (India)
- Coordinates: 11°32′35″N 78°21′01″E
- Country: India
- State: Tamil Nadu
- District: Namakkal

Languages
  - Official: Tamil
- Time zone: UTC+5:30 (IST)

Ayilpatty is a village in Rasipuram taluk, Namakkal district of Tamil Nadu, India.

== Temples ==
Anandhai Amman and Maari Amman are the prominent temples. The yearly Thaer Thiruvizha of Maari amman is the most famous festival in Ayilpatty. This celebration extends for four days.

Other temples like pachayamman and anjaneyar kovil also located in ayilpatty.
