= R.Pudupalayam =

- Village Panchayat
- Location in Tamil Nadu, India R.Pudupalayam (India)
- Coordinates: 11.479465°N 78.194295°E
- Country: India
- State: Tamil Nadu
- District: Namakkal

Languages
  - Official: Tamil
- Time zone: UTC+5:30 (IST)

R.Pudupalayam is a village panchayat near Rasipuram municipal corporation in Namakkal district in the Indian state of Tamil Nadu. It is located about 25 kilometres (16 mi) from Salem, Tamil Nadu. People use the bus to commute for their business to the nearest location for business and personal works. It is famous for handloom cotton sarees and silk sarees manufacturing.
