= Navaladi Karuppuswami Temple =

Temple in Mohanur, India

Navaladi Karuppannaswami Temple
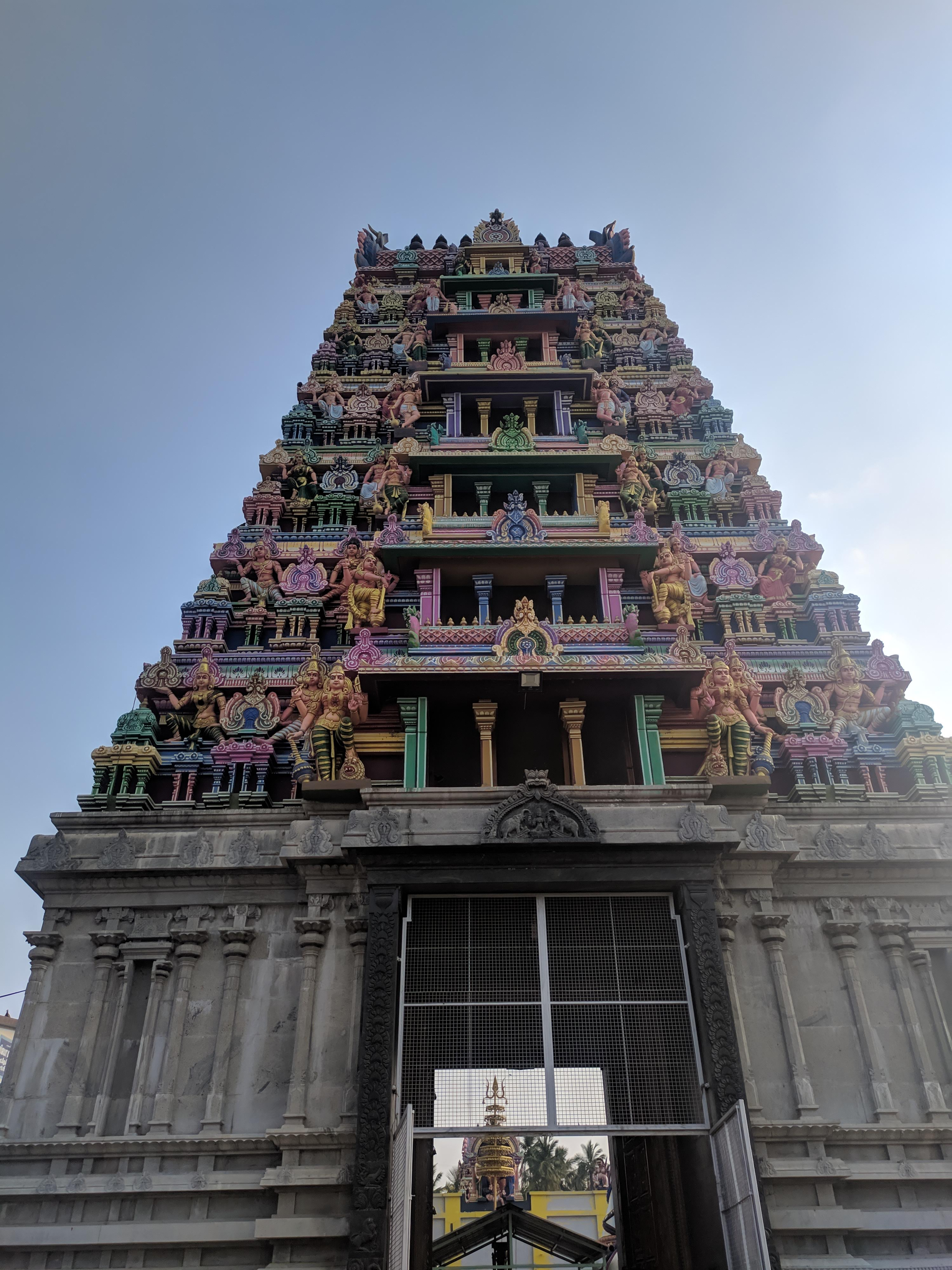
- Interactive map of Navaladi Karuppannaswami Temple
- Location: Mohanur, Namakkal, Tamil Nadu
- Nearest city: Mohanur, Namakkal
- Coordinates: 11°03′11.2″N 78°08′43.5″E

Arulmigu Navaladi Karuppannaswami Temple – Mohanur is a 500-1000 year-old temple in Mohanur, Namakkal District, Tamil Nadu, India. Its presiding deity is Karuppu Sami, also known as Navaladian and Judge Durai and known as Pattamarathan. Its reputation is Swayambu known for two trees, the "Holy tree" known as Naval tree and the "Special tree", known as Neem Tree.

== Legend ==
King Mohur Pazhayan ruled Mohanur and prayed to Navaladian before making decisions. He declared the nearby Neem Tree as the Watch Tree of the region. After the invasion of Senguttuvan, the Naval tree became dry. As the deity was near this tree, he called Pattamarathaian. As he was also near the Naval tree, the deity was also known as Navaladian.

== Consecrated (Kumbabisekam) ==
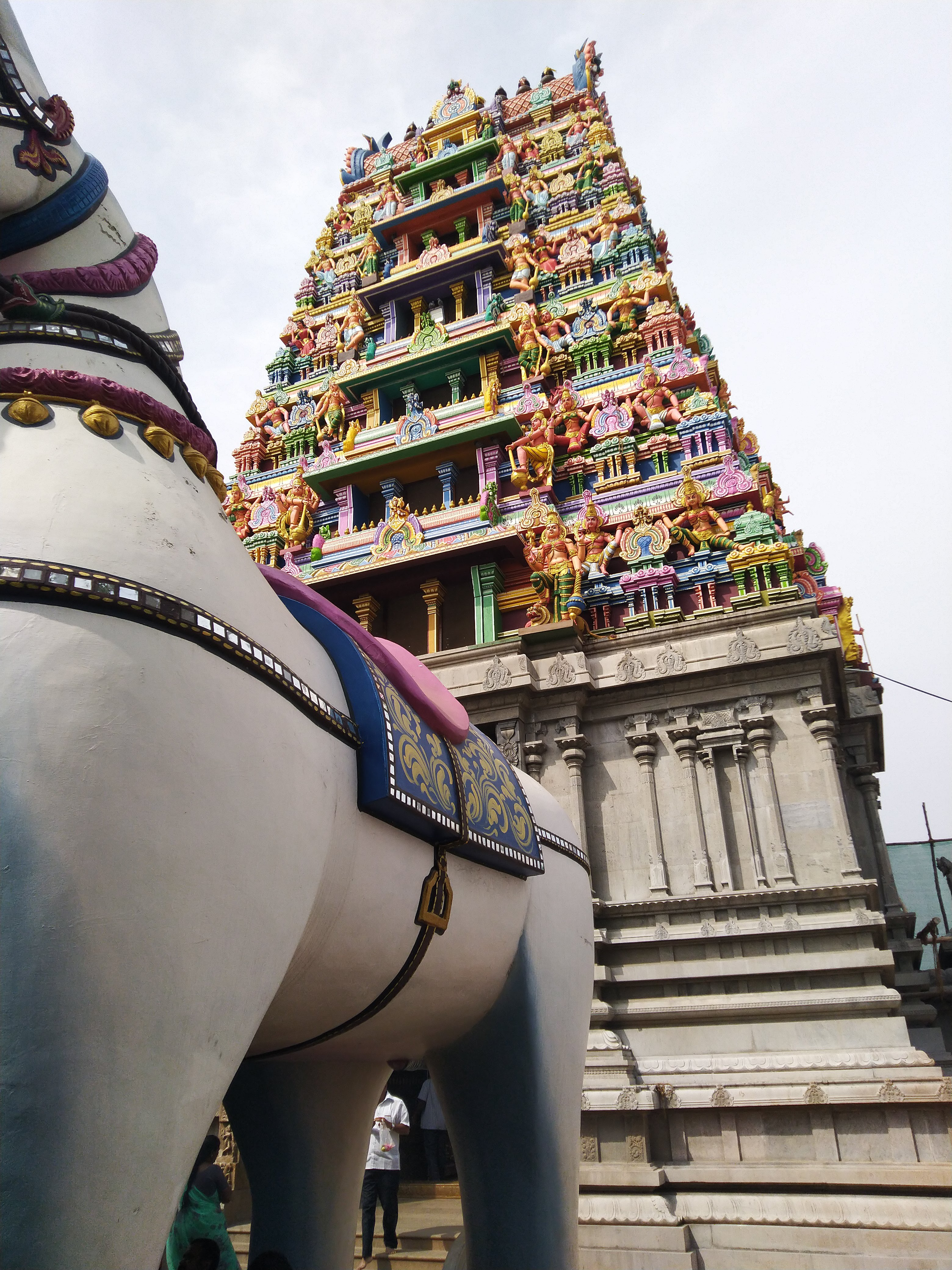
Temple inside

After a while, the Navaladiyan Temple along with Mariyamman and Kaaliamman temple is mean to be consecrated after finishing the Construction of New RajaGopuram in Navaladiyan temple which is very high. Kumbabisekam is planned on 17-06-2018. The Festival will be for three days from 15 June to 17 June. On the Final Day of the Festival Major VIP's were invited for the Function. They were H'ble Chief Minister Edappadi K. Palaniswami, H'ble Deputy Speaker and Member of Lok Sabha M. Thambidurai, H'ble Minister of power and Member of the Legislative Assembly P. Thangamani, Thiru Sevvoor S.Ramachandran. Minister for Hindu Religious and Charitable Endowments, Minister for Transport Thiru M. R. Vijayabhaskar, Minister for Social Welfare Ms. V. Saroja, H'ble P. R. Sundaram Member of Lok sabha.

== Prayer ==
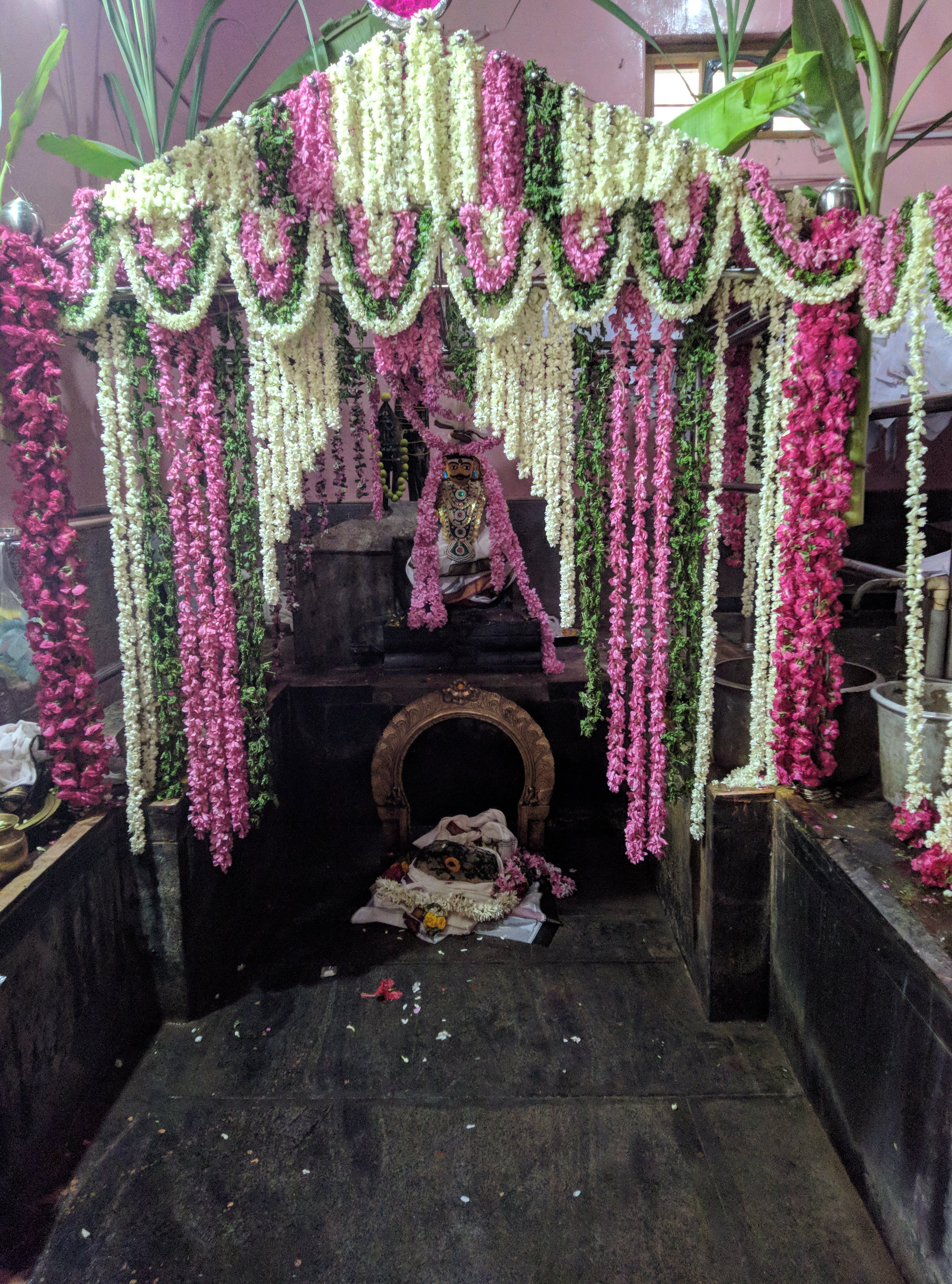
Shri Navaladian

Devotees throng the temple seeking solutions for burden of debt, family problems, incurable diseases, for success in raising cattle and for children and suitable marriage alliances. People sacrifice sheep and cocks to the deity. The midnight puja called Sathya Puja considered very important by the devotees.

Here people submit their prayers in writing. They state their grievances in a petition as if submitting to an official and tie them in the Pattamaram tree in the temple. They speak face to face with the deity.

== Description ==
The Swayambu Murthy is in a pit in the temple. There is a dry tree behind the swayambu called Pattamaram, meaning that the tree is dry. The Chera King Senguttuvan performed the field puja here before invading to the north. The Chellandiamman shrine is very popular. The pujas performed here are non-vegetarian.

== Festivals ==
During the Panguni month (March–April) Mariamman festival is celebrated for 10 days. The Kaliamman festival follows then in Chithirai (April–May), lasting 8 Days.
