= Peramandampalayam =

- village
- Location in Tamil Nadu, India Peramandampalayam (India)
- Coordinates: 11°6′46.7″N 78°6′17.1″E
- Country: India
- State: Tamil Nadu
- District: Namakkal

Languages
  - Official: Tamil
- Time zone: UTC+5:30 (IST)

Peramandampalayam is a large village located in Mohanur Taluka of Namakkal district, Tamil Nadu, India. It is one of the 27 villages of Mohanur Block of Namakkal district with total 718 families residing. Peramandampalayam village has a population of 2,400 of which 1,165 are males while 1,235 are females as per Population Census 2011.
