= Devanangurichi =

- Census town
- Location in Tamil Nadu, India
- Coordinates: 11°23′20″N 77°51′35″E
- Country: India
- State: Tamil Nadu
- District: Namakkal

Population (2001)
  - Total: 6,817

Languages
  - Official: Tamil
- Time zone: UTC+5:30 (IST)

Devanangurichi is a census town in Namakkal district in the state of Tamil Nadu, India.

== Demographics ==
As of 2001 India census, Devanangurichi had a population of 6817. Males constitute 51% of the population and females 49%. Devanangurichi has an average literacy rate of 61%, higher than the national average of 59.5%: male literacy is 71% and, female literacy is 51%. In Devanangurichi, 11% of the population is under 6 years of age.
