= Ottakulampudur =

Otta Kulam Pudur
- village
- Interactive map of Otta Kulam Pudur
- Coordinates: 11°14′11.23″N 78°11′35.27″E
- Country: India
- State: Tamil Nadu
- District: Namakkal

Languages
  - Official: Tamil
- Time zone: UTC+5:30 (IST)
- Postal code: 637 405
- Vehicle registration: TN-28
- Nearest city: Namakkal

Otta kulam pudur is one of the village in Namakkal District. It is located on the Namakkal-Sendamangalam road about 3 km.

The people in the village are mostly involved in agriculture and in the lorry (truck) business for a decade. Now younger generation people are all educated and few went to cities like Coimbatore, Chennai, Bangalore and North India for their work.

In earlier days, all youngsters play cricket at most of the time, but recently they started playing volleyball in week end.

Every year there will be festival in Vingayagar temple and Mariyamman temple.
