= Kakkaveri =

Village in Tamil-Nadu state, India

Coordinates: 11°27′N 78°13′E

Kakkaveri is a village panchayat in the Namakkal district of Tamil-Nadu state, India.
