= Andapuram =

- Village
- Nickname: village of temples and gods
- Location in Tamil Nadu, India Andapuram (India)
- Coordinates: 11.0649171°N 78.2252312°E
- Country: India
- State: Tamil Nadu
- District: Namakkal

Government
  - Body: Panchayat

Languages
  - Official: Tamil
- Time zone: UTC+5:30 (IST)
- PIN: 637 020
- Telephone code: 04286

Andapuram is a village on the banks of Uppar river, in the Namakkal district of the Indian state of Tamil Nadu. Andapuram is a Gram Panchayat, falling in the Mohanur Revenue Block, Namakkal Taluk. Andapuram is in the Namakkal Assembly constituency and Namakkal Parliamentary constituency of India.

== Location ==
Andapuram is situated 19 km (12 mi) away from Namakkalon the Valayapatti-Kattuputhur road en route from Namakkal-Tiruchirappalli on Tamil Nadu State Highway 25.

== Education ==
The following educational institutions are present in Andapuram:

- Government High School
- Salem Co-operative Sugar Mills Polytechnic College, Mohanur
- Vetri vidhyalaya matriculation school
- Panchayat union elementary school

== Hospitals ==
The nearest health care facilities are in Alampatti, a village 2 km (1.2 mi) from Andapuram.

1.Primary health center Alampatti

2.Primary health center Murungai

== Temples ==
Temples located in Andapuram include the following:

- Chellayi Amman Temple
- Pillaiyar Temples
- Mariamman Temple
- Arasamarathu Temple
- Perumal Temple
- Shivan Temple

== See also ==
- Namakkal (Lok Sabha constituency)
- Namakkal District
- Andapuram lake
