= Velagoundampatti =

Place in Tamil Nadu, India

- Neighbourhood
- Location in Tamil Nadu, India Velagoundampatti (India)
- Coordinates: 11°20′54″N 78°16′15″E
- Country: India
- State: Tamil Nadu
- District: Namakkal
- Taluk: Namakkal

Languages
  - Official: Tamil
- Time zone: UTC+5:30 (IST)
- PIN: 637212
- Vehicle registration: TN 28

Velagoundampatti is a neighbourhood in the Municipality consolidation of Namakkal in the Indian state of Tamil Nadu. It was merged with the Namakkal city in 2016 .

== private buses ==
- Erode - Namakkal(HARIKRISHNA)

== Post office ==
637212 is the pin code number of Velagoundampatti S.O post office in Namakkal district, Tamil Nadu, India as codified by Indiapost.

== Railway station ==
The nearest railway station to Velagoundampatti is Namakkal railway station. which is 16 km distance from here. Nearest Railway junctions are Erode railway station stands nearby of 47 km distance and the next Salem Junction railway station of 63 km from here

== Airport ==
The nearest International Airport is Tiruchirappalli International Airport which is on 110 km Distance and second Coimbatore International Airport with 135 km distance. And The nearest Domestic airport is Salem Airport 70 km from here

== River ==
The nearest river for Velagoundampatti is paramathi velur kaveri river which is 22 km distance from here.
