= Pavithrampudur =

Coordinates: 11.1433°N 78.3813°E

Pavithrampudur is a village in Namakkal district, Tamil Nadu, India. It is located on the state highway connecting the district headquarters, Namakkal with Thuraiyur, one of the other major towns of the neighboring district Thiruchirappalli.

- This village serves as the eastern border of Namakkal district. The adjacent district is Thiruchirappalli.
- It is the birthplace of Cinema director Babu Yogeswaran. He has directed the film Daas.
- The southern part of Kolli Hills is located at a distance of just 5 km from this village.
- This place having the pincode of 637021 as under Varagur Sub Office.
- The temple of Ambayiramman is located just 1 km away. This temple figures in the opening of the title card of the Tamil film Bama Vijayam.
