= Kalianoor =

- Village
- Country: India
- State: Tamil Nadu
- District: Namakkal

Languages
  - Official: Tamil
- Time zone: UTC+5:30 (IST)

Kalianoor or Kaliyanur is a village in Namakkal district in the Indian state of Tamil Nadu.

== Demographics ==
As of 2001 census, Kalianoor had a population of 6407.
