= Erumaipatti block =

Erumaipatti block is a revenue block in the Namakkal district of Tamil Nadu, in India. The headquarter of the block is in Erumaipatti. The block has a total of 24 panchayat villages. "_in Tamil".

Name of the Panchayats:

1. ALANGANATHAM
2. BODINAICKENPATTI
3. BOMMASAMUDRAM
4. DEVARAYAPURAM
5. KAVAKARANPATTI
6. KODIKKALPUDUR
7. KONANGIPATTI
8. METTUPATTI
9. MUTHUGAPATTTI
10. MUTTANCHETTI
11. PALAYAPALAYAM
12. PAVITHRAM
13. PAVITHRAM PUDUR
14. PERUMAPATTI
15. POTTIREDDIPATTI
16. PUDUKOTTAI
17. REDDIPATTI
18. SEVINTHIPATTI
19. SIVANAICKENPATTI
20. THIPRAMADEVI
21. VADAVATHUR
22. VALAVANTHI
23. VARADHARAJAPURAM
24. VARAGUR
