= Thalambadi =

- Village
- Location in Tamil Nadu, India Thalambadi (India)
- Coordinates: 11°17′58″N 78°09′15″E
- Country: India
- State: Tamil Nadu
- District: Namakkal

Population (2001)
  - Total: 2,700

Languages
  - Official: Tamil
- Time zone: UTC+5:30 (IST)
- PIN: 637019
- Nearest city: Namakkal, Salem

Thalambadi is a village panchayat in Namakkal in the state of Tamil Nadu, India.

Located 11 km from the city of Namakkal and 2 km from National Highway (NH-7). It had a population of approximately 2,700 at the 2001 census. Amman Temple, Murugan Temple and Perumal temple are situated in the village

- Nearest bus stop: Bommai kuttai medu (2 km)
- Nearest railway station: Kalangani
- Neighbouring villages: Thalambadi located north of Periyagoundampatty, west of Bommaikuttaimedu, east of Sedapatty Pudur, south of Thipakapatty.
