= Nettayampalayam =

Neighbourhood in Namakkal district, Tamil Nadu, India

- Village
- Location of Nettayampalayam in Tamil Nadu
- Coordinates: 11°14′N 78°10′E
- Country: India
- State: Tamil Nadu
- District: Namakkal
- Elevation: 218 m (715 ft)

Population (2014)
  - Total: 545
- Time zone: UTC+5:30 (IST)
- PIN: 637 208
- Telephone code: 91 - 4268
- Vehicle registration: TN-28

Nettayampalayam is a village in Paramathi-velur Taluk Namakkal district in the Indian state of Tamil Nadu.

The village consists of mainly irrigated fields. Agriculture is the major occupation of the people. Sugarcane, coconut trees, paddy and banana trees are the major crops cultivated.

Pothiyakadu is a sub-village located in the north part of the village with easy access to the Kabilarmalai area. This village lacked in agricultural cultivation until the 1990s. In 1990 some of the village landlords decided to construct a pipeline to carry the river water from Kauvery river (which called as Scheme). The construction was done in later 1991 and carried the Kauvery water from Ponamalarpalayam Kauvery bank which is located nearly 5 km away from this village. This scheme water is being used for more than 300 acres. This village had a very few houses constructed until the 2000s. Thereafter people started constructing well-formed houses beside the main road of Nettayampalayam to Kabilarmalai.

== Geography ==
Nettayampalayam is located at 11.23°N 78.17°E. It has an average elevation of 218 metres (726 ft). It is close to Kabilarmalai (Ex, Constituency of Tamil Nadu). The closest river is Kaveri and it is located 3 km south of Kabilarmalai and 3 km north of Kondalam panchayat.

== History ==
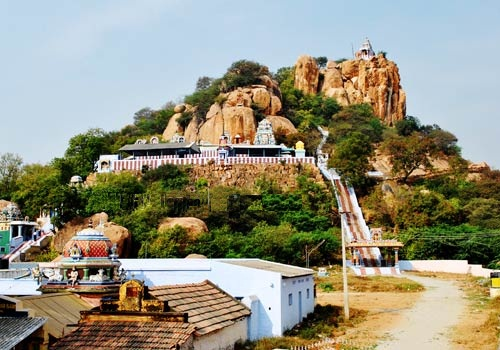
Kabilarmalai Murugan Temple

Nettayampalayam has been an agriculture village for the past five decades.

== Economy ==
The economy of the village is merely agriculture.

== Education ==
Government high school is located at the middle of the village and students from local and surrounding villages (AnnaNagar, Ponmalarpalayam, Marudhur, Velagoundampalayam) are educated there.

=== Colleges and schools near Nettayampalayam ===
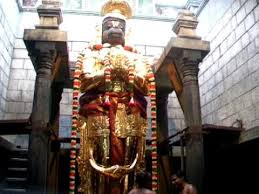
Namakkal Anjaneya Temple

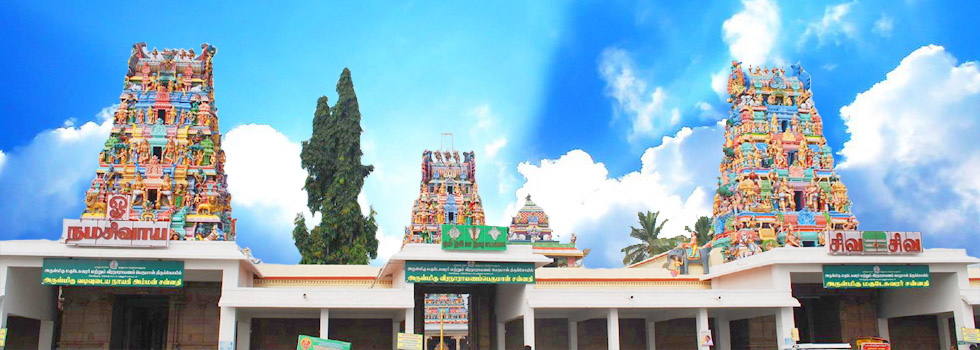
Kodumudi Magudeswarar Temple

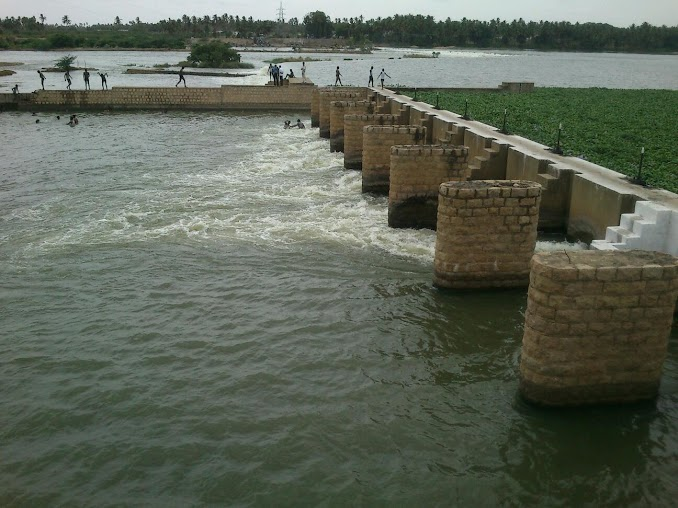
Jedarpalayam Dam

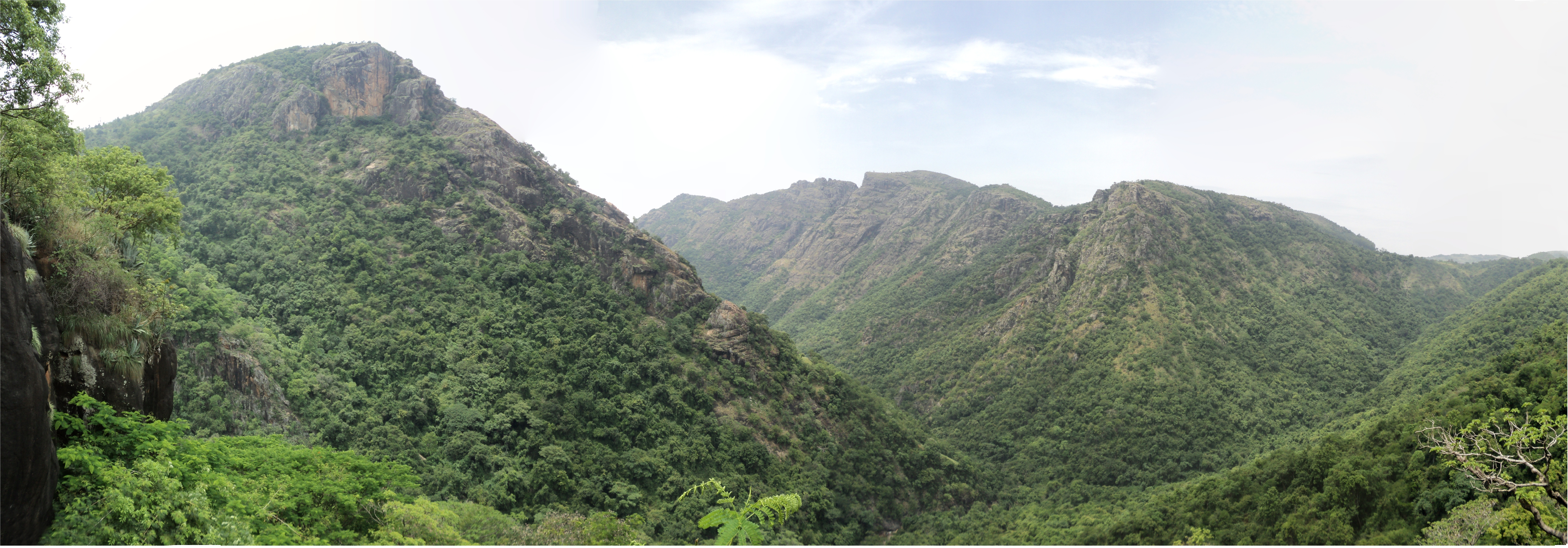
Kolli Hills

- Kandasamy Kandar's College, Paramathi Velur Namakkal 638182
- PGP College of Engineering, NH7 - Namakkal to Karur, Paramathi, Namakkal 637207
- K S Maniam College of Education, Irukkurpost; Paramathi Velur (tk), Namakkal 637204
- K.S. Maniam Institute Of Distance Education, Valasupalayam, Irukkur Post, Paramathi Velur (tk), Namakkal Dt.
- GHS Nettayampalayam, Nettayampalayam, Kondalam post, P. Velur, Namakkal, Tamil Nadu, PIN 637208
- GHS Kabilarmalai, Kabilarmalai, P. Velur, Namakkal, Tamil Nadu, PIN 637204
- GHSS Paundamangalam, Paundamangalam, P. Velur, Namakkal, Tamil Nadu, PIN 637208
- GHS Pilikkalpalayam, Pilikkalpalayam P. Velur, Namakkal, Tamil Nadu, PIN 637213
- RN Oxford Matriculation School, Paundamangalam, P. Velur, Namakkal, Tamil Nadu, PIN 637208
- Vivekananda High School, Paundamangalam, Pungampalayam, Paundamangalam, P. Velur, Namakkal, Tamil Nadu, PIN 637208
- Malar Matriculation School, Paramathi, Kabilarmalai Road, Paramathi, Namakkal, Tamil Nadu, PIN 637207

== Demographics ==
According to the 2011 census, Nettayampalayam had a population of 545. Tamil is the local language.

== Transport ==
Buses ply from Paramathi Velur and Jedarpalyam. There is also easy access to Tiruchengode, Erode, Namakkal and Karur towns.

Pugalur and Mohanur railway stations are near Nettayampalayam. However, Erode and Salem Junction Railway Stations are the major railway stations, and are 50 km near to Nettayampalayam.

The nearest international airport is at Trichy (105 km) and Coimbatore International Airport (133 km).

== Nearest tourist spots ==
Lord Vinayaka Temple is a famous temple in this village which was renovated in the 2000s. It is located at the center of the village and just opposite Government High School.

Every year especially during Pongal festival a special pooja will be held and all people from the village will gather together on this day.

Kaliamman Temple is another famous temple which is located just near to Vinayaka temple. It was renovated in the 2010s.

Other attractions include Kabilarmalai Murugan Temple (2 km), Jedarpalayam Dam (8 km), Kodumudi Magudeswarar Temple (6 km), Namakkal Anjeneya Temple (25 km), Namakkal Fort (25.5 km), and Kolli Hills (75 km).
