= Tiruchengode division =

Thiruchengode division is a revenue division in the Namakkal district of Tamil Nadu, India.
