= Thengaperumalpalayam =

- Village
- Country: India
- States: Tamil Nadu
- District: Namakkal

Languages
  - Official: Tamil
- Time zone: UTC+5:30 (IST)
- PIN: 637208

Thengaperumalpalayam is a village in Vengarai, Paramathi Velur, Namakkal district, Tamil Nadu, India.
