= Vadugam =

Vadugam Thoppanayanapatti
- village
- Location in Tamil Nadu, India
- Coordinates: 11.491022°N 78.2469°E
- Country: India
- State: Tamil Nadu
- District: Namakkal
- Elevation: 246 m (807 ft)

Population (2001)
  - Total: 3,000

Languages
  - Official: Tamil
- Time zone: UTC+5:30 (IST)
- PIN: 637407
- Sex ratio: 100:191 ♂/♀

Vadugam is a panchayat village in Namakkal district in the Indian state of Tamil Nadu. It is 32 km from Salem, 333 km southwest of Chennai, 242 km south of Bangalore and 118 km northwest of Tiruchirapalli (Trichy). M. Balan is the Panchayat President of Vadugam as of 2021. It is close to the tribal areas of Bodhamalai.

== Climate ==
The temperature ranges from 20 to 44 degrees Celsius throughout the year.

== Tourism ==
The main tourist and picnic spot of the Vadugam is the Perumpaalli Falls which has water falling from the height of about 100 feet at three different stages, which is located 8 km from Rasipuram,

Every year around April the village celebrates Mariamman festival for a fortnight. During this festival, Goddess Mariamman is decorated with jewellery and flower chariots and taken around the village at midnight. This festival is celebrated for a week.

== Education ==
=== Schools ===
- Government Higher Secondary School - Vadugam
- Rassie Vidya Mandir Primary and Nursery School - Vadugam

The village also has several other colleges, such as:

- Muthayammal Institutions
- Gnanmani Institutions
- Paavai Institutions
- Thiruvalluvar Govt. Arts College
- Mahendra Institutions
- AMS Engineering college
- Dr. Hanemann Homeopathy medical college

== Transport ==
The village is situated 10 km from Rasipuram with several buses round the clock. Buses are found frequently to Salem, Nammakal, Erode and villages around here.

Nearby railway junction is Rasipuram.
