= Agrahara Mettupatty =

Coordinates: 11.109°N 78.232°E

Agrahara Mettupatty is a small village near Valayapatty in Namakkal district of Tamil Nadu. It is 15 km (9.3 mi) south of Namakkal and 2 km (1.2 mi) south of Valayapatty Panchayat. It is at the bank of Karaipottan river. Its Postal Index Number is 637020.

== History ==
The name Agrahara Mettupatty derived from the Iyers as most of the peoples were Iyers (Brahmins). They hold major agricultural fields in the village. The Iyers received those lands from the Zamindars and local rulers. The rest of the people were working for the Iyers and took care of their agricultural fields and cattle. Later on, most of the Iyers left the village and settled in the nearby cities. As a result, people bought the agricultural lands from the Iyers and started working on it.

== Pyramid Shape Temple Towers ==
There is a Lord Siva (Sri Sivakama Sundari Udanurai, Sri Chithambareshwarar Aalayam) and Kothanda Perumal temple present in this village. It has been of significant importance to this village as it is constructed in the shape of a pyramid (Egyptian pyramids). The Mettupatty Zamindars, who ruled all eight villages, including Agrahara Mettupatty, had constructed this pyramid-shaped temple 300 years before. The temple towers are also in the shape of pyramids. There is a Pirathosa Pooja every 15 days in the month. All the peoples from surrounding areas, including local politicians, used to come and attend the Prirathosa pooja.

== Business and Economy ==
The entire village's economy and business is based on agriculture and farming. In the earlier days, agriculture was the main source for their livelihood. Due to several factors like changes in lifestyle and education, and due to lower rainfall, the people are moving towards the cities. Even though it is a village, the people still take up vocations such as medicine, banking, police, law, etc.
