= Namakkal division =

Coordinates: 11°14′N 78°10′E

Namakkal division is a revenue division in the Namakkal district of Tamil Nadu, India.
