= Chinna Veppanatham =

- village
- Nickname: veppanam
- Location in Tamil Nadu, India Chinna Veppanatham (India)
- Coordinates: 11°38′55″N 78°46′10″E
- Country: India
- State: Tamil Nadu
- District: salem

Languages
  - Official: Tamil
- Time zone: UTC+5:30 (IST)
- PIN: 637002
- Vehicle registration: TN-28
- Nearest city: Trichy, Salem, Erode and Coimbatore

Chinna Veppanatham is a village located in Namakkal district, Tamil Nadu, India. This is one of the villages under Vasanthapuram Panchayat.

== Located in ==
Fourth km from Namakkal to Trichy StateHighway.

== Pin code and STD code ==
Postal services are given to this village by the Vasanthapuram post office which is located around 2 kilometers away,

Pin code : 637002.

STD code : 04286.

== Temple ==
Most of the people living in this village are Hindu. In Tamil Nadu one of the famous Hindu Goddess is Amman (meaning 'mother'). People used to pray amman in different names. This village also has one of the amman temple named Bagavathiamman Temple in the center of the village.

This temple has one Vinayagar Temple and Muni. Muni is another famous God of Tamil. People pray this god because they believe he is the guard to the Village.
