= C. S. Dileep =

Member of the Tamil Nadu Legislative Assembly
- Incumbent
- Assumed office 2026
- Preceded by: P. Nagarajan
- Constituency: Namakkal

Personal details
- Born: 1992 (age 33–34) Namakkal, Tamil Nadu, India
- Party: Tamilaga Vettri Kazhagam
- Education: PSG Arts College, Coimbatore (B.Com.)
- Profession: Transport and business

C. S. Dileep is an Indian politician and member of Tamilaga Vettri Kazhagam (TVK).

He is the elected Member of the Legislative Assembly (MLA) for the Namakkal Assembly constituency in Namakkal district, Tamil Nadu, having won the seat in the 2026 Tamil Nadu Legislative Assembly election.
