= Elandakuttai =

Coordinates: 11.399206°N 77.778187°E

Elanthakuttai is a village located in Komaraplayam Taluk of Namakkal district, Tamil Nadu, India, on the bank of the Kaveri River. It is located in between Sankari and Pallipalayam in Kongu Nadu region.
