= Namakkal taluk =

Coordinates: 11°14′N 78°10′E

Namakkal taluk is a taluk of Namakkal district of the Indian state of Tamil Nadu. The headquarters of the taluk is the town of Namakkal.

== Demographics ==
According to the 2011 census, the taluk of Namakkal had a population of 540,148 with 272,175 males and 267,973 females. There were 985 women for every 1,000 men. The taluk had a literacy rate of 70.32%. Child population in the age group below 6 was 24,026 Males and 21,648 Females.
