= Erumaipatti =

Panchayat town in Namakkal district, Tamil Nadu, India

- Town panchayat
- Location in Tamil Nadu, India
- Coordinates: 11.1667°N 78.2833°E
- Country: India
- State: Tamil Nadu
- District: Namakkal
- Taluk: Senthamangalam

Area
  - Total: 16.427 km^{2} (6.343 sq mi)

Population (2011)
  - Total: 12,085
  - Density: 735.68/km^{2} (1,905.4/sq mi)

Languages
  - Official: Tamil
- Time zone: UTC+5:30 (IST)

Erumaipatti, also known as Erumapatty, is a town panchayat in Sendamangalam taluk of Namakkal district in the Indian state of Tamil Nadu. It is located about 17 km (11 mi) east of Namakkal along the road connecting Namakkal and Thuraiyur. Spread across an area of 16.427 km^{2} (6.343 sq mi), the town panchayat is divided into 15 wards. It had a population of 12,085 as per the 2011 census.

== Geography and administration ==
Erumaipatti is located in Sendamangalam taluk of Namakkal district in the Indian state of Tamil Nadu. The town panchayat covers an area of 16.427 km^{2} (6.343 sq mi) and is divided into 15 wards and 62 streets. It is administered by the Erumapatti town panchayat, classified as a first grade (Grade - I) town panchayat (annual revenue between ₹ 5 to 10 million), and the panchayat administration is responsible for providing basic services including maintenance of roads, water supply, health and sanitation. It is part of the Erumaipatti block consisting of 25 villages. Erumaipatti forms part of the Senthamangalam Assembly constituency of the Tamil Nadu Legislative Assembly and the Namakkal Lok Sabha constituency.

== Demographics ==
According to the 2011 census, Erumaipatti had a population of 12,085 across 2,954 households. The population consisted of 6,299 males and 5,786 females, with a sex ratio of 919 females per 1,000 males. About 976 (8.1%) of the population were children aged less than six years. The town had a literacy rate of approximately 83.8%, with male literacy at 89.8% and female literacy at 77.2%. Scheduled Castes accounted for 14.2% of the population, while Scheduled Tribes accounted for 0.2%. As per the 2011 census, Hinduism was the predominant religion, practiced by 85.7% of the population, followed by Islam (10.6%) and Christianity (3.2%).

== Culture ==
There are nine temples and annual temple festivals are held in March and May. Jallikattu is held in January during the Pongal festivities.

== Economy ==
Agriculture is the principal occupation in the town panchayat. The area contains black and clay loam soils, and the agricultural lands are generally irrigated by tanks and wells. Millets, rice, and oil seeds are the major crops, and others include sugercane, cotton, and pulses. Sericulture is also practiced with the revenue block producing 7,832 kg (17,267 lb) of silk cocoons in 2014-15. Other industries in the block include poultry and textiles. According to a 2017 report by the Tamil Nadu Pollution Control Board, the block is classified as "over exploited" in terms of availability of ground water.

== Transport and infrastructure ==
Erumaipatti is located about 17 km (11 mi) east of Namakkal on the Namakkal–Thuraiyur Main Road. The nearest railway station is Namakkal railway station, located about 17 km (11 mi) from the town panchayat. The nearest major airport is Tiruchirappalli International Airport.

Annai Mathammal Sheela Engineering College, established in 1996, is located along the Namakkal–Thuraiyur road in the town panchayat.
