= Rasipuram taluk =

Taluk in Namakkal district, Tamil Nadu

Coordinates: 11.47°N 78.17°E

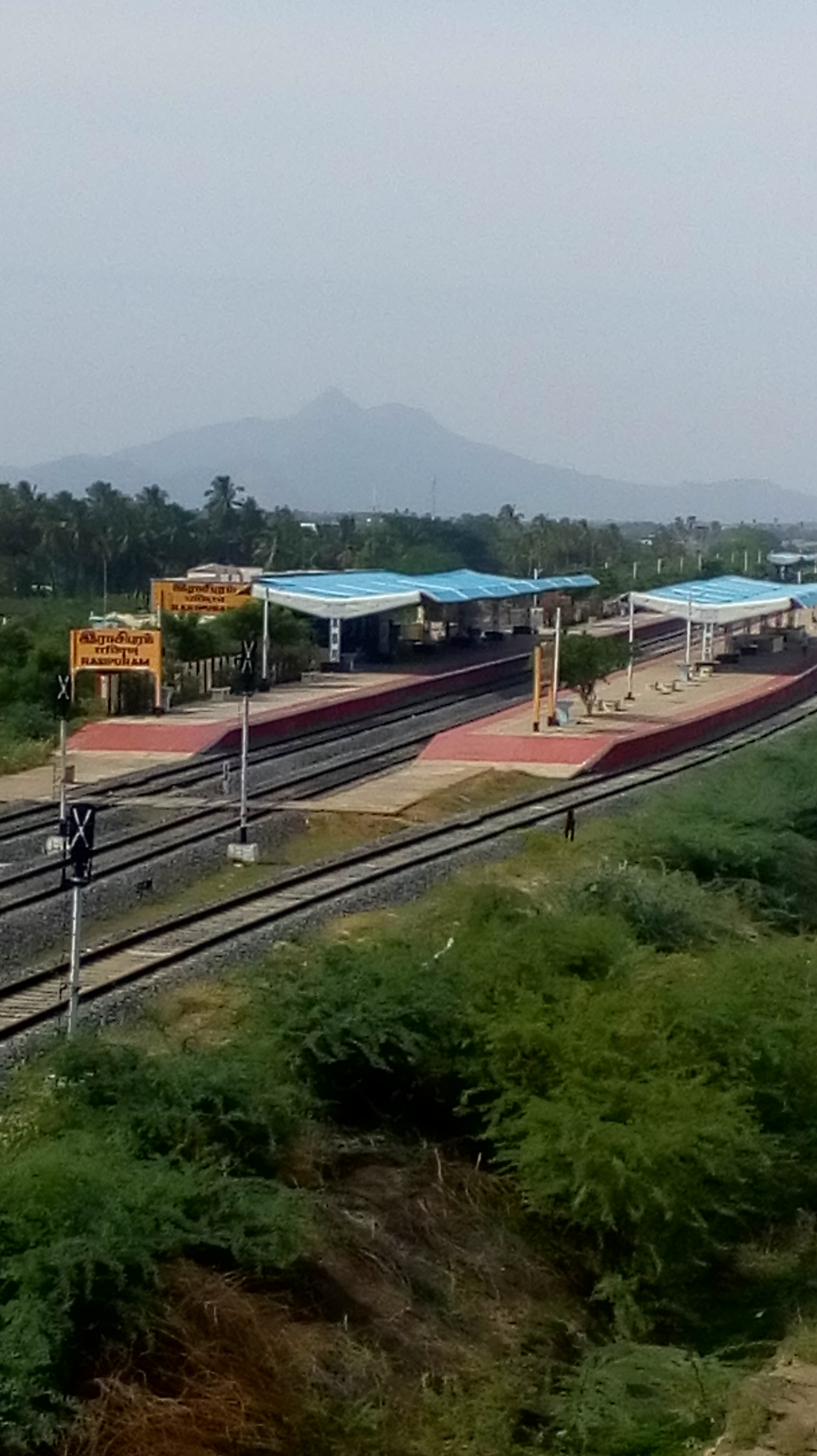
Rasipuram railway station

Rasipuram taluk is a taluk of Namakkal district of the Indian state of Tamil Nadu. The headquarters of the taluk is the town of Rasipuram.

The Pudupalayam and Ayilpatty villages are located within this taluk.

== Demographics ==
According to the 2011 census, the taluk of Rasipuram had a population of 339,790 with 173,079 males and 166,711 females. There were 963 women for every 1000 men. The taluk had a literacy rate of 66.49. Child population in the age group below 6 was 14,573 Males and 12,917 Females.
