= Ariyur, Karur =

Ariyur
- Neighbourhood
- Location in Tamil Nadu, India Ariyur (India)
- Coordinates: 10.895°N 77.948°E
- Country: India
- State: Tamil Nadu
- District: Karur

Languages
  - Official: Kongu Tamil
- Time zone: UTC+5:30 (IST)

Ariyur is a village in K.Paramathy block, Karur district in the Indian state of Tamil Nadu. It is located 23 kilometres (14 mi) to the west of district headquarters Karur, 6 kilometres (3.7 mi) from K.Paramathy and 408 kilometres (254 mi) from the state capital Chennai.

Ariyur Pin code is 639111 and postal head office is Paramathi (Karur) .

Thumbivadi (7 km), Molapalayam (8 km), Karudayampalayam (8 km), Nagamballi (9 km), Gudalur East (9 km) are the nearby villages to Ariyur. Ariyur is surrounded by Aravakurichi Taluk to the south, Karur Taluk to the east, Kodumudi Taluk to the north, Thanthoni Taluk to the east.

== Nearby cities ==
Karur, Vellakoil, Punjaipugalur, Namakkal are the nearby cities to Ariyur.

== Demographics ==
As of 2001 India census, This place is in the border of the Karur District and Erode District. Erode District Kodumudi is North towards this place.

== Transport ==
Karur Junction is major railway station 23 kilometres (14 mi) from Ariyur.
