= Bama Vijayam (1934 film) =

- Directed by: Manik Lal Tandon
- Produced by: A. N. Maruthachalam Chettiar
- Starring: G. N. Balasubramaniam; M. R. Krishnamurthi; P. S. Ratna Bai; P. S. Saraswathi Bai
- Music by: K. Thyagaraja Desigar
- Production company: Pioneer Films
- Distributed by: Chellam Talkies
- Release date: 1934
- Country: India
- Language: Tamil
- Budget: ₹50,000
- Box office: ₹1,000,000

Bama Vijayam (transl. Bama's Victory) is a 1934 Indian Tamil-language film directed by Manik Lal Tandon. The film featured G. N. Balasubramaniam making his acting debut in Tamil cinema, M. R. Krishnamurthi, P. S. Ratna Bai and P. S. Saraswathi Bai in the leading roles. P. S. Ratna Bai and P. S. Saraswathi Bai are well known as the Palayamkottai Sisters.

== Cast ==
Adapted from Film News Anandan and The Hindu.

- G. N. Balasubramaniam as Narada
- M. R. Krishnamurthi as Krishna
- P. S. Ratna Bai as Satyabhama
- P. S. Saraswathi Bai as Rukmini

== Production ==
Bama Vijayam marked the acting debut of Carnatic musician and singer G. N. Balasubramaniam, who played the role of sage Narada. In the film's opening credits, Balasubramaniam's name appeared as "Hutchins Plate Fame Sangeetha Vidwan". (Note: According to Randor Guy, Hutchins was then "a well known gramophone recording company of that period and 78 rpm discs were then colloquially known as 'plates'".) The film was produced by A. N. Maruthachalam Chettiar under his banner, Chellam Talkies. "Chellam" was also Chettiar's pet name. The film's ending showed all the characters singing the song Jana Gana Mana, which film historian Randor Guy mentions it as the first time the future national anthem of India was sung on screen. The rendition of the song instilled a feeling of patriotism amongst cinema goers.

== Soundtrack ==
K. Thyagaraja Desigar composed the film's score. There were 59 songs in the film, out of which Balasubramaniam sang 10. Balasubramaniam's first song as the character was "Balakanakamaya", a Tyagaraja kirtana which Guy believed to be the first composition of the aforementioned saint in the Atana raga. Another song was "Koti Nadulu", a duet by Balasubramaniam and M. R. Krishnamurthi. The song was also another composition by Tyagaraja based on the raga Todi.

== Reception ==
According to Randor Guy, was a box office success and "made a sizeable profit", grossing ₹1,000,000 against a budget of ₹50,000. In the Tamil magazine Ananda Vikatan, writer Kalki Krishnamurthy reviewed the film and called it "'Paatti'!", which was a word play on talkie and "paattu", the Tamil word for song.
