= Rasipuram railway station =

Rasipuram Junction

Rasipuram Erasipuram
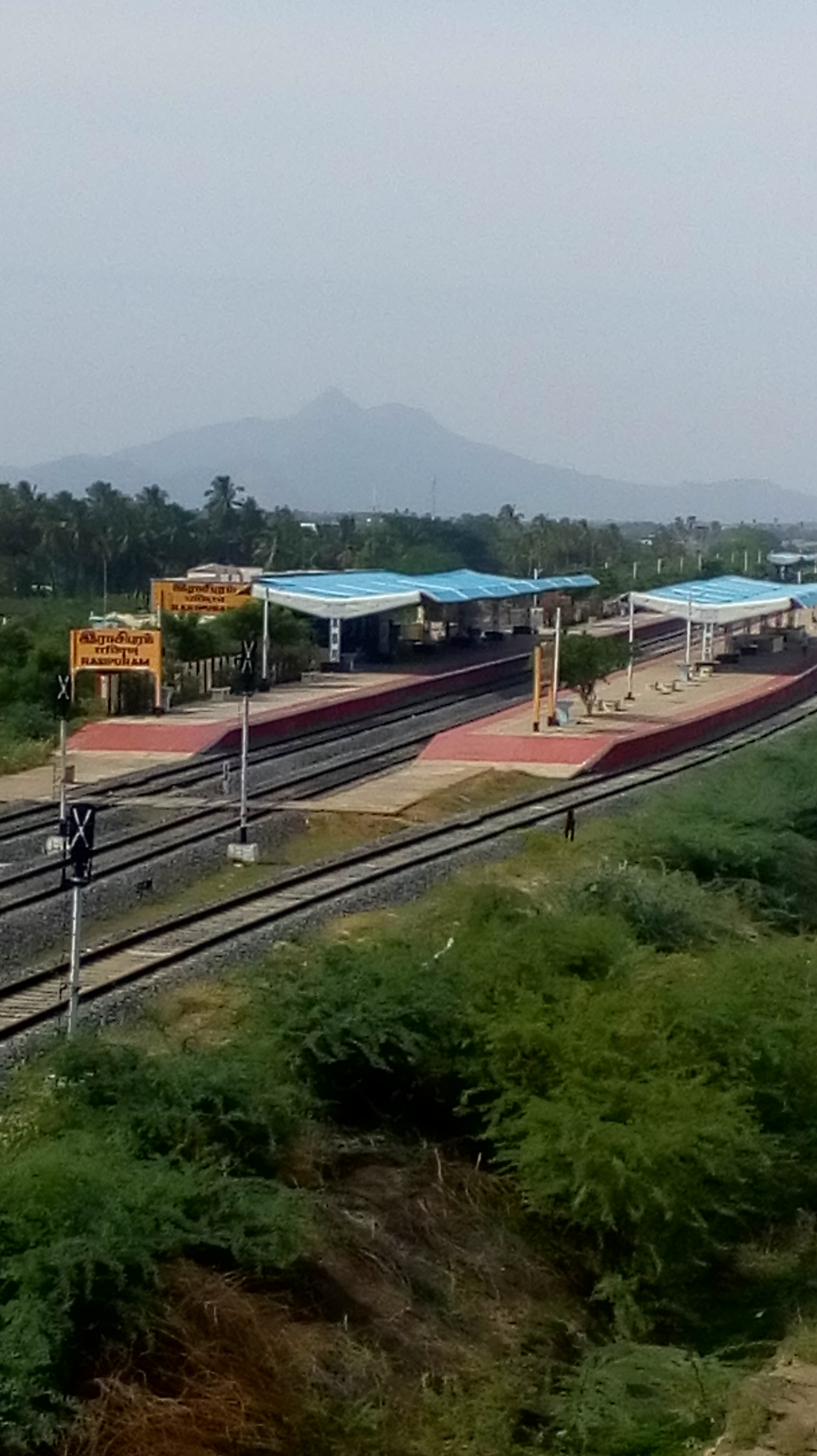
- Rasipuram railway station

General information
- Location: Tiruchengode Rd, Rasipuram-637408,Tamil Nadu, India
- Coordinates: 11°27′12.5″N 78°10′42.9″E
- Elevation: 222 metres (728 ft)
- System: Indian Railways station
- Owner: Indian Railways
- Line: Salem Junction–Karur Junction line
- Platforms: 3
- Tracks: 3
- Connections: Autos, taxis

Construction
- Structure type: On-ground
- Parking: No parking available

Other information
- Station code: RASP
- Zone(s): Southern Railway zone
- Division(s): Salem
- Fare zone: Southern Railway zone

History
- Opened: May 2013 (13 years ago)
- Electrified: 25 kv AC, 50 Hz
Route map
Location
- Location within India Location within Tamil Nadu

Rasipuram railway station (station code: RASP) is an NSG–6 category Indian railway station in Salem railway division of Southern Railway zone. It is a railway station situated in Rasipuram, in the Indian state of Tamil Nadu. The station is an intermediate station on the newly commissioned Salem Junction–Karur Junction line which became operational in May 2013.
