= Namakkal railway station =

Railway station in Tamil Nadu, India

Namakkal Namakkal

General information
- Location: Senthamangalam Road, Bharatiar Nagar, Namakkal, Namakkal district, Tamil Nadu; India
- Coordinates: 11.14°N 78.10°E
- Elevation: 186 metres (610 ft)
- System: Indian Railways station
- Owner: Indian Railways
- Operator: Southern Railway zone
- Line: Salem Junction–Karur Junction
- Platforms: 3 Platform
- Tracks: 4
- Connections: By Walk

Construction
- Structure type: Standard
- Parking: No

Other information
- Status: Functioning
- Station code: NMKL
- Zone(s): Southern Railway zone
- Division(s): Salem

History
- Opened: May 2013; 13 years ago
- Electrified: Yes 25 kv AC, 50 Hz

Passengers
- 250
Route map
Location
- Location within India Location within Tamil Nadu

Namakkal railway station (station code: NMKL) is an NSG–5 category Indian railway station in Salem railway division of Southern Railway zone. It is a railway station situated in the Town of Namakkal in the Indian state of Tamil Nadu. The station is an intermediate station on the newly commissioned Salem–Karur line which became operational in May 2013.

== History ==
Hon'ble MP Kulandaivelu demanded this railway line 1979 in Parliament written question.

== Projects and development ==
It is one of the 73 stations in Tamil Nadu to be named for upgradation under Amrit Bharat Station Scheme of Indian Railways.
