= Mohanur =

Mohanur Mohai
- Municipality / Taluk
- Nickname: Kovil nagaram
- Location in Tamil Nadu, India
- Coordinates: 11.08°N 78.17°E
- Country: India
- State: Tamil Nadu
- Region: Kongu Nadu
- District: Namakkal
- Established: September 2018
- Elevation: 143 m (469 ft)

Population (2011)
  - Total: 14,315

Languages
  - Official: Tamil
- Time zone: UTC+5:30 (IST)
- Postal code: 637 015
- Vehicle registration: TN-28 & TN-88
- Website: http://www.townpanchayat.in/mohanur

Mohanur is a municipality and subdistrict in the Mohanur block of Namakkal district in the Indian state of Tamil Nadu.

== Etymology ==
Several reasons are offered for the origin of the name.

1. One reason given is that the people of this region worked as middle men or agents in the ancient era. Mugavar is the term in Tamil for agents. So the place came to be known as Mugavanur which derived later on as Moganur.
2. Another reason is that Shiva wanted to see the reincarnation of Vishnu as a woman i.e. Mohini, here in this location.
3. Another reason goes that once all the heavenly devas went in search of Shiva accompanied by Ganga. But he was alone there. So they started their search for Ganga and went to Muruga. He too started to search her. Searching for her, they reached Madurai where Madurai Meenakshi directed them towards north near Cauvery. Muruga came to Cauvery, yet didn't find her. So He went on a severe meditation on her. Ganga appeared in front of him. She was so overwhelmed by his motherly love and hugged him. Since the mother-son love between them was found here, the place was called Maganur. Magan means "son" in Tamizh. Maganur later derived as Mohanur.

== Geography ==
Mohanur is a taluk situated at the southernmost part of Namakkal district, on the bank of river Cauvery. It is located at 11.08°N 78.17°E. It has an average elevation (MSL) of 143 metres (469 feet). It is located 409 km southwest of Chennai and 273 km south of Bengaluru and 75 km south of Salem and it is near by Namakkal (18 km) and Karur (12 km), Paramathi Velur (16 km) the special feature of Mohanur is that it is the only place where the river Cauvery runs from north to south. After Kasi here the place, Ahiva (Asaladeepeswarar in Mohanur) temple which located right side in banks of river that passing north to south. Another place is Kailasanathar Temple in Murappanadu, Thirunelveli where the temple is located on the banks of Thamaraparani flowing from North to South. It is also famous for historic temples which are visited by many Hindus from all over the state. Mohanur is a temple town in Namakkal district.The famous Navaladiyan temple located in the border of Mohanur and Kumaripalayam.

== Demographics ==
As of 2011 India census, Mohanur had a population of 14,315. Males constitute 50% of the population and females 50%. Mohanur has an average literacy rate of 80.67%,: male literacy is 87.65% and female literacy is 74.04%. In Mohanur, 8.91% of the population is under 6 years of age. The sex ratio stands at 1046 and child sex ratio at 998. Mohanur is a town with many schools and a college. There is a police station for the nearby villages. It also has many hospitals. The broad-gauge railway line from Salem to Karur passes through this place. Mohanur to Vangal Bus route Bridge opened for traffic. The State Highways-95 is originating at Mohanur. This road passes through Namakkal, Sendamangalam and end at rasipuram. Mohanur-Vangal (Karur) bridge opened for traffic now its connected Karur by road within 14 km. This is the shortest route for Salem to Karur.

== Religion ==
There are many temples in the city, including the Navaladi Karuppuswami Temple and Sri Kaliamman Temple. There is also a mosque situated in Velur Road and a Roman Catholic church is situated in Kattuputhur Road.

== Government and politics ==
Mohanur is part of Namakkal (state assembly constituency) and Namakkal (Lok Sabha constituency).

=== Police station ===
Mohanur has a police station for Mohanur town and 21 villages and their 93 Sub villages.

== Economy ==
- The Salem Co-Operative Sugar Mills Ltd in Mohanur. It is the second highest level production factory in Tamil Nadu. In has up to 1000 employees working.
- And some numbers of small scale industries like textiles, food processing, and mosquito net manufacturers are in Mohanur.
- Software companies such as Zoho Corporation has a presence here.

== Institutions ==
=== Colleges ===
- Government Polytechnic College - Sugar mill, Vandigate, Mohanur.
- Subaramaniyam Arts and Science College - Kattur, Mohanur.

=== Schools ===
- Government Higher Secondary School (Boys) - Mohanur
- Government Higher Secondary School (Girls) - Mohanur
- Kalaimagal Matriculation Higher Secondary School - Mohanur
- Rasi Matriculation School - Mohanur
- Panchayat Union Primary School, Suramaniyapuram - Mohanur
- Panchayat Union Primary School, Mettutheru - Mohanur

== Transport ==
=== Rail ===
- Daily Trains available to Chennai - Palani @ 3.59 AM.
- Palani -Chennai @ 9.09 PM.
- Salem - Karur passenger @ 7.16 AM.
- Karur - Salem passenger @ 8.45 AM.
- Salem - Karur passenger @ 6.46 PM.
- Karur - Salem Passenger @ 8.04 PM.
- Trichy - Salem Passenger(Special) @ 11.40 AM.
- Salem - Trichy Passenger(Special) @ 1.30 PM.

=== Road ===
Mohanur is connected by road to Namakkal (North), Paramathi Velur (West), Valayapatti (East), Karur (South) and Kattuputhur (Southeast). SH 95 Connects Mohanur and Rasipuram (via) Namakkal, Senthamangalam. This road is established to two-way lane. The cauvery river bridge has opened Mohanur-Vangal bridge to connection of Salem - Karur (via) Mohanur.

Mohanur is connected to the major cities of Tamil Nadu like Namakkal, Karur, Salem, Trichy, Erode, Palani, Thiruvannamalai, Chennai. Frequent buses accessed to Namakkal, Salem, Karur, Paramathi Velur, Valayapatty, Trichy, and Kattuputhur. Daily Govt buses available to Chennai at 8.30 am and 8.30pm.

- Several private travel agency operate their Omni buses to Chennai daily.

== Notable people ==
- Venkatarama Ramalingam Pillai
- Natarajan Chandrasekaran
