= Rasipuram =

- Municipality
- Nickname: Rajakkalpuram
- Location in Salem, India Rasipuram (Tamil Nadu) Rasipuram (India)
- Coordinates: 11.4618°N 78.1909°E
- Country: India
- State: Tamil Nadu
- District: Namakkal 637408

Government
  - Type: Selection Grade Municipality
  - Body: Rasipuram Municipality
- Elevation: 246 m (807 ft)

Population (2011)
  - Total: 50,244

Languages
  - Official: Tamil
- Time zone: UTC+5:30 (IST)
- Vehicle registration: TN-28,88

Rasipuram is a Municipality in the Indian state of Tamil Nadu and suburb of city of Salem located in Namakkal District. It is the headquarters for the Rasipuram taluk. As of 2015, the town had a population of 88,584 and an area of 24 km^{2} (9.3 sq mi). It has 27 wards and steps have been taken to increase the wards to 33. Rasipuram is known for ghee and tapioca sago.

== History ==
Rasipuram dates to the 1st century AD. The town's name is derived from 'Rajapuram' which literally means 'King's Town'.

The county (Nagaratchi) of Rasipuram was formerly under the jurisdiction of the Salem District (Managaratchi) and was later governed by the Namakkal District range.

Rasipuram is also known for its Lord Shiva temple, said to have been constructed by King Valvil Ori in the 1st or 2nd century.

== Demographics ==
Religious census
Religion	Percent(%)
Hindu	92.13%
Muslim	6.02%
Christian	1.79%
Sikh	0.01%
Buddhist	0.01%
Jain	0.0%
Other	0.04%
No religion	0.0%

According to the 2011 census, Rasipuram had a population of 50,244 across a total of 13,104 households.

The city had a higher ratio of females to males than the national average (1,077 females to every 1,000 males, national average 929) and higher literacy than the national average (77.71% in Rasipuram compared to national average of 72.99%).

4,168 people (12.05%) were under the age of six (2,183 male, 1,985 female) at the time of survey and Scheduled Castes and Scheduled Tribes accounted for 12.3% and .53% of the population, respectively.

There were a total of 20,138 workers, comprising 334 cultivators, 722 main agricultural labourers, 2,019 in household industries, 16,120 other workers, 943 marginal workers, 17 marginal cultivators, 31 marginal agricultural labourers, 84 marginal workers in household industries and 811 other marginal workers.

As per the religious census of 2011, Rasipuram had 92.13% Hindus, 6.02% Muslims, 1.79% Christians, 0.01% Sikhs, 0.01% Buddhists, 0.0% Jains, 0.04% following other religions and 0.0% following no religion or did not indicate any religious preference.

== Geography ==
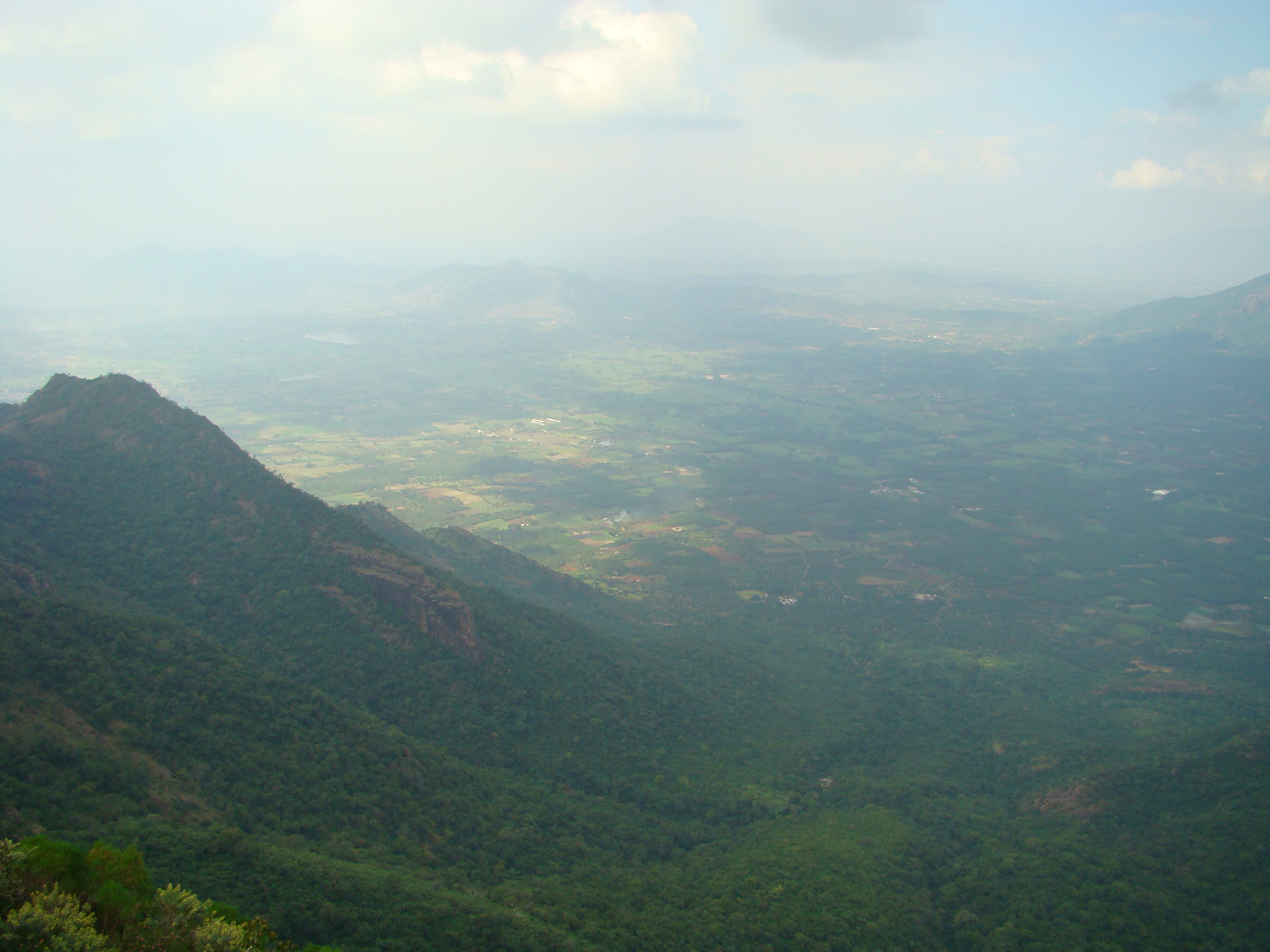
Kollihills Valley

Rasipuram is located at 11.47°N 78.17°E. It has an average elevation of 246 metres (807 feet). Kolli Hills is located exactly 54 kilometres (34 mi) from Rasipuram. A lot of medicinal plants and fruit varieties like jackfruit, pineapple and banana are available.

== Culture ==
A festival named after the legendary king Valvil Ori is celebrated to highlight the indigenous traditions, culture and values of the tribal people living in the hills. Nithya sumagali Mariamman temple festival which is celebrated in the Tamil month of Aippasi.

Also 63 Nayanmars festival is celebrated grandly every year.

A mini town called R.Puduppati is located inside Rasipuram Taluk. Where the Thulukka sudamaniamman temple is present. Every year, last Wednesday of panguni month is celebrated as a Thear Thiruvizha on this temple.

== Politics ==
Rasipuram is a state assembly constituency. Dr. Madhivendhan serves as MLA of Rasipuram Constituency. Rasipuram Constituency is removed from the latest alignments and joined with Namakkal Lok sabha Constituency.

It is a part of the Rasipuram (Lok Sabha constituency).

== Economy ==
The town is known for weaving silk sarees (Rasipuram silks). These iconic woven silk sarees and dhotis are traded and exported.

Another popular item created in this town is the pure homemade ghee.

== Transportation ==
=== Road ===
Rasipuram is located on highway NH7 which connects Salem and Namakkal. Rasipuram town has two bus stands (i.e. old and new bus stand). New bus stand serves buses to Vennandur, Coimbatore, Namakkal, Salem, Attur, Kallakurichi, Karur, Erode, Tiruchengode, Chennai, Bangalore, Mettur, Palani, Bhavani, Sankari, Trichy, Edappadi, Komarapalayam, Paramathi Velur, and Senthamangalam.

Andagalur gate, located on NH 7, is a stop for all Mofussil buses which skip Rasipuram town.

SH79 (Attur–Mallikkarai–Rasipuram–Tiruchengode–Erode Road) and SH95 (Mohanur–Namakkal–Sendamangalam–Rasipuram Road) are the two state highways which connect to the town.

=== Railway ===
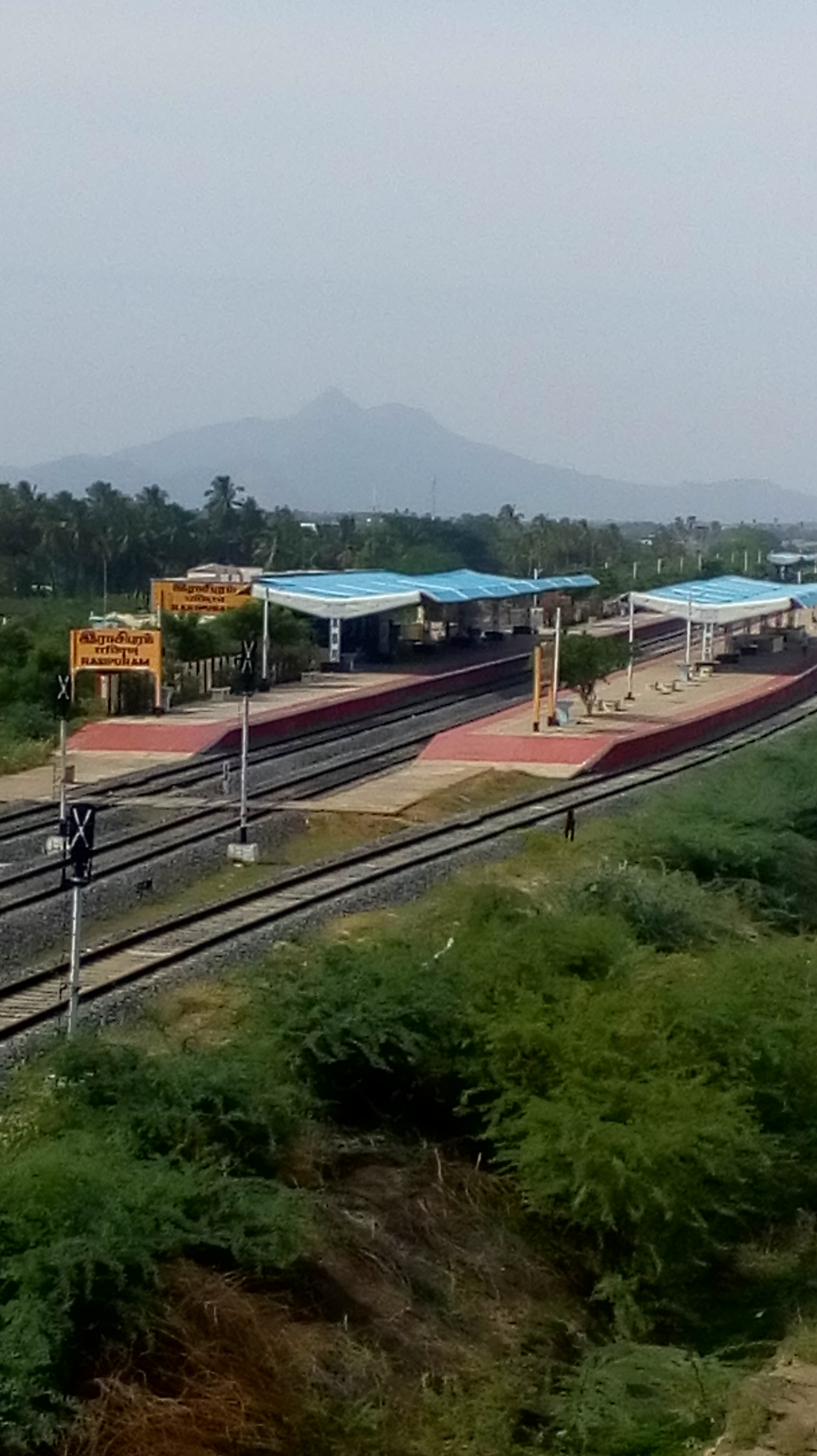
Rasipuram Railway station

The town is located on a new broad-gauge line, opened in May 2013, which connects Salem and Karur. The Rasipuram Railway Station (RASP) is connected to major cities in South India, with daily express trains from Chennai Central, Bangalore, Salem, Madurai, Nagercoil, Tirunelveli and Palani and weekly express trains from Hyderabad and Jabalpur.

=== Airport ===
The nearest airport is Salem Airport which is 37 kilometres (23 mi) north of the town.
