= Thathaiyangarpet =

- Panchayat Town
- Location in Tamil Nadu, India
- Coordinates: 11.123°N 78.450°E
- Country: India
- State: Tamil Nadu
- District: Tiruchirappalli
- Taluk: Musiri

Government
  - Type: Town Panchayat
  - Body: Local government in Tamil Nadu

Population (2001)
  - Total: 12,276

Languages
  - Official: Tamil
- Time zone: UTC+5:30 (IST)
- Postal code: 621214
- Area code: 04326(XXXXXX)
- Vehicle registration: TN-48

Thathaiyangarpet is a panchayat town in Musiri taluk, Tiruchirappalli district in the Indian state of Tamil Nadu.

== Demographics ==
As of 2001 India census, Thathaiyangarpet had a population of 12,276. Males constitute 51% of the population and females 49%. Thathaiyangarpet has an average literacy rate of 70%, higher than the national average of 59.5%: male literacy is 78%, and female literacy is 62%. In Thathaiyangarpet, 9% of the population is under 6 years of age.
