= Sendamangalam =

Senthamangalam சேந்தமங்கலம்
- Municipality / Taluk
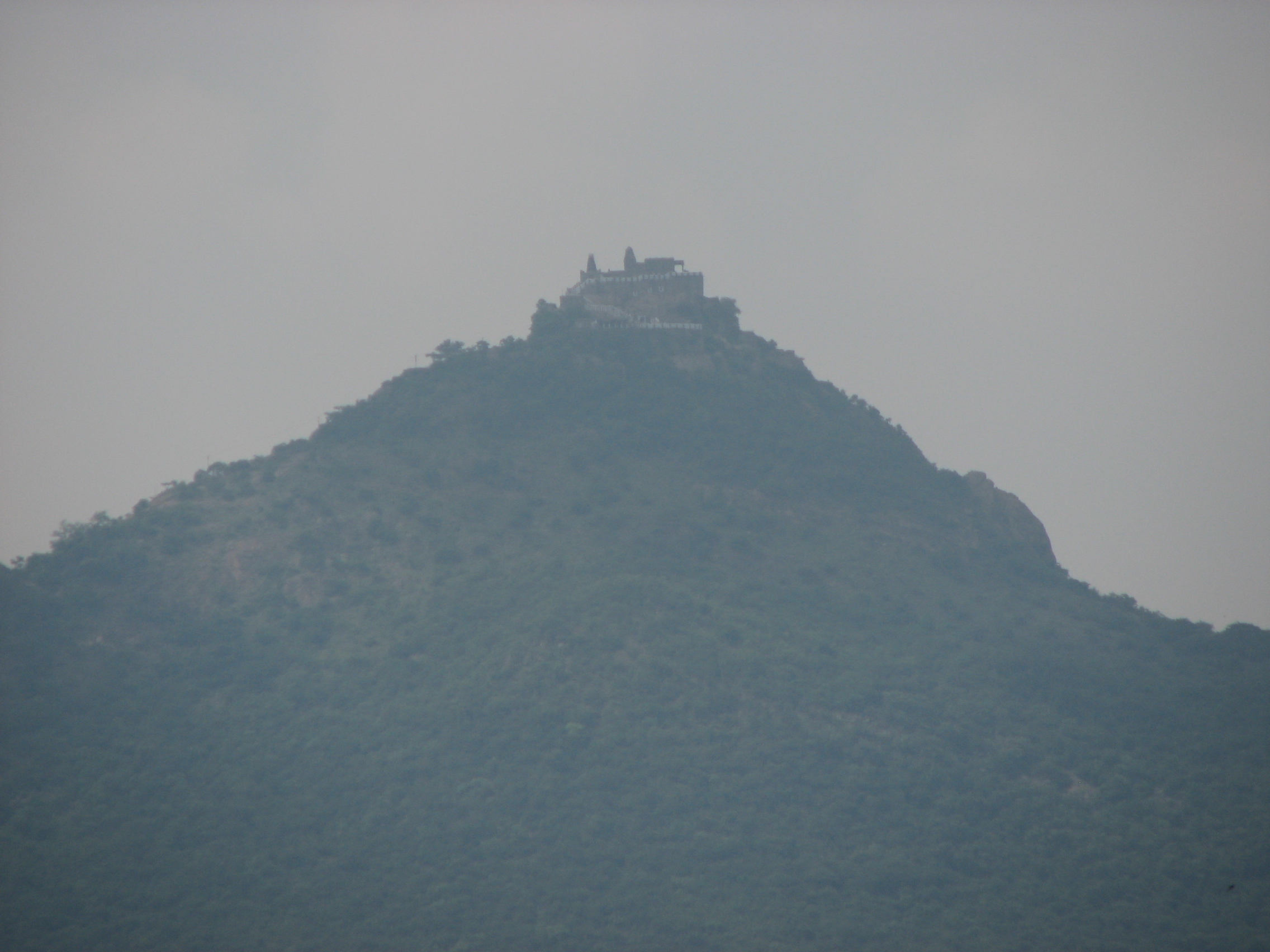
- Nainamalai
- Nickname: Senthai
- Location in Namakkal, Tamil Nadu, India
- Coordinates: 11.3000°N 78.2333°E
- Country: India
- State: Tamil Nadu
- Region: Kongu Nadu
- District: Namakkal
- Taluk: Senthamangalam

Government
  - Type: Municipality
  - Body: Senthamangalam Municipality
- Elevation: 240 m (790 ft)

Population (2011)
  - Total: 19,750

Languages
  - Official: Tamil
- Time zone: UTC+5:30 (IST)
- PIN: 637409
- Telephone code: 91-4286
- Vehicle registration: TN-88, Namakkal South

Sendamangalam (also transliterated as Senthamangalam) is a municipality and taluk in Namakkal district in the Indian state of Tamil Nadu.

== Geography ==
Sendamangalam is located at 11.30°N 78.23°E. It has an average elevation of 240 metres (790 ft). Sendamangalam is close to Kolli Hills (கொல்லி மலை), which are part of the Eastern Ghats. The closest river is the Kaveri River. The municipality is approximately 350 kilometres (220 mi) southwest of Chennai, 255 kilometres (158 mi) south of Bangalore, 50 kilometres (31 mi) south of Salem, 93 kilometres (58 mi) northwest of Tiruchirapalli, and 200 kilometres (120 mi) north of Madurai.

=== Climate ===
The temperature ranges from 20 °C (68 °F) to 44 °C (111 °F) throughout the year.

== Demographics ==
=== Population ===
As of the 2011 Indian census, there were 19,750 people. Males made up 49% of the population, and 51% were female. 9% of the population was under 6 years of age. The average literacy rate was 75.47%, above the national average of 59.5%. The census reported 83.9% of males were literate, while 67.5% of females were literate.

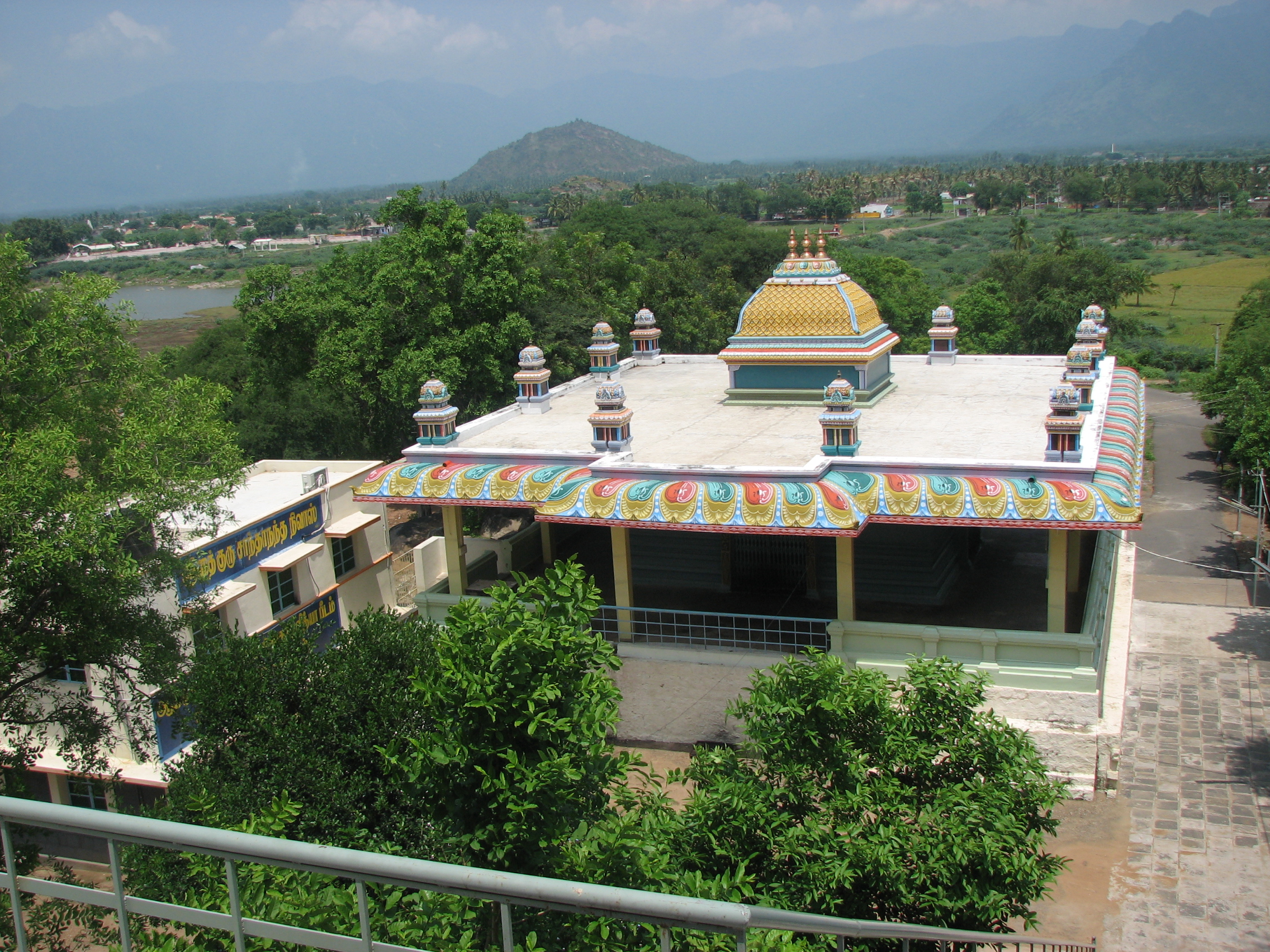
Thathagiri Murugan temple

== Government and politics ==
The Senthamangalam taluk is part of Namakkal Lok Sabha constituency, while it has its own legislative assembly constituency.

=== Civic administration ===
Sendamangalam began functioning as a taluk on 2 June 2015. It had previously been in Namakkal taluk.

== Transport ==
=== Air ===
The nearest airports are Salem Domestic Airport and Tiruchirappalli International Airport.

=== Rail ===
The nearest major railway stations are in Namakkal and Salem.

=== Road ===
Sendamangalam is located 12 kilometres (7.5 mi) northeast from Namakkal on State Highway SH-95.
