= Namakkal district =

- District
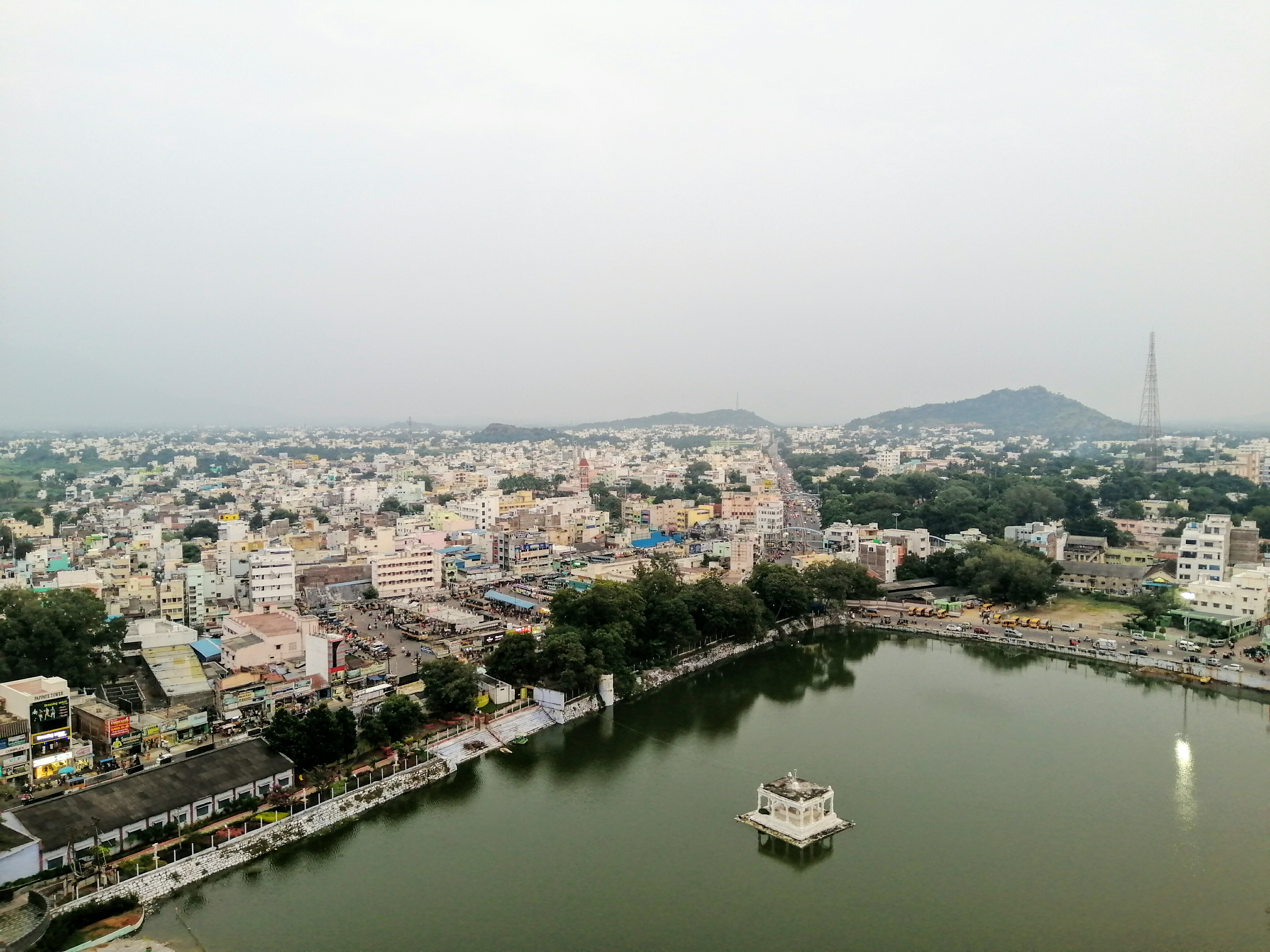
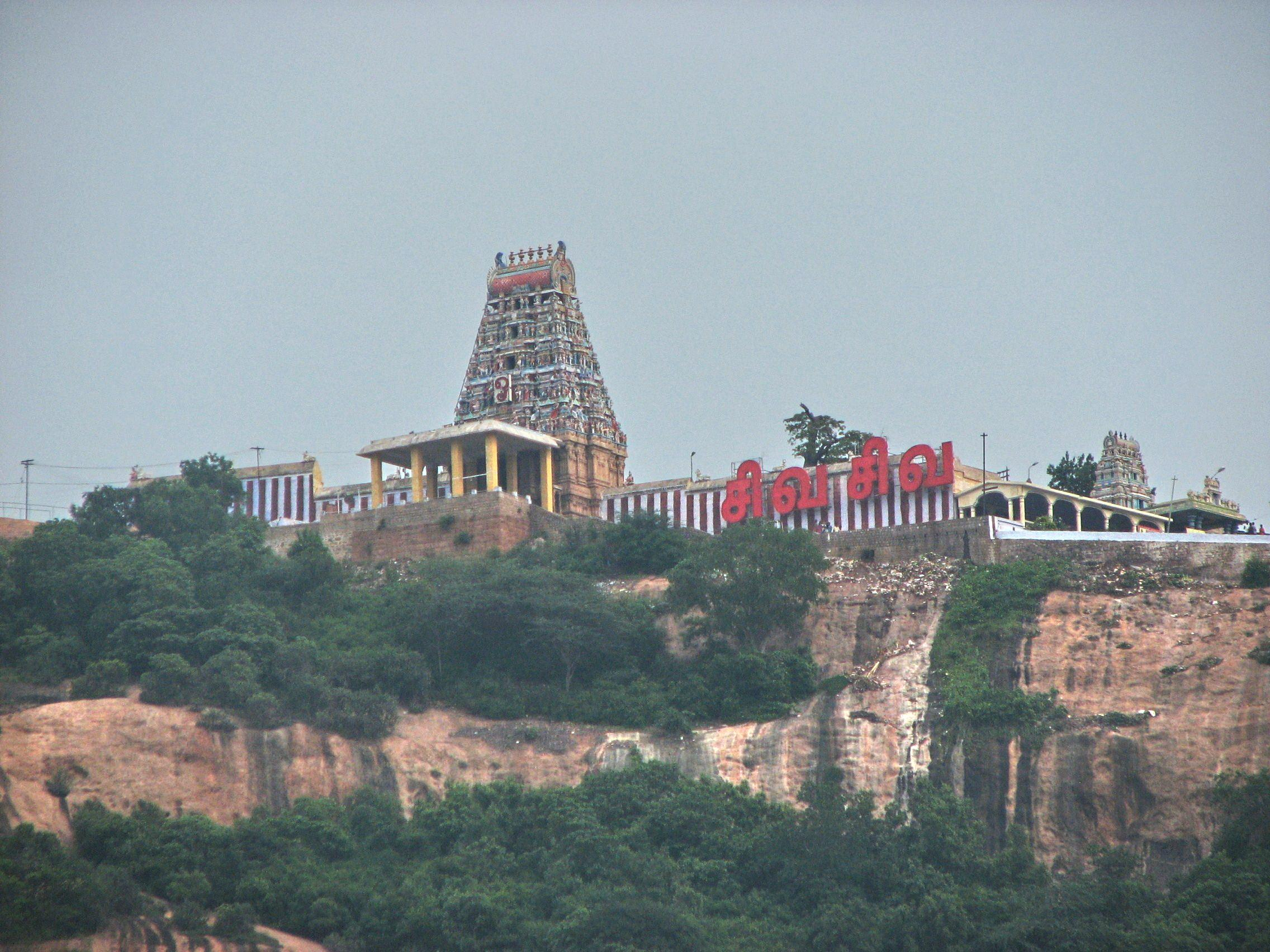
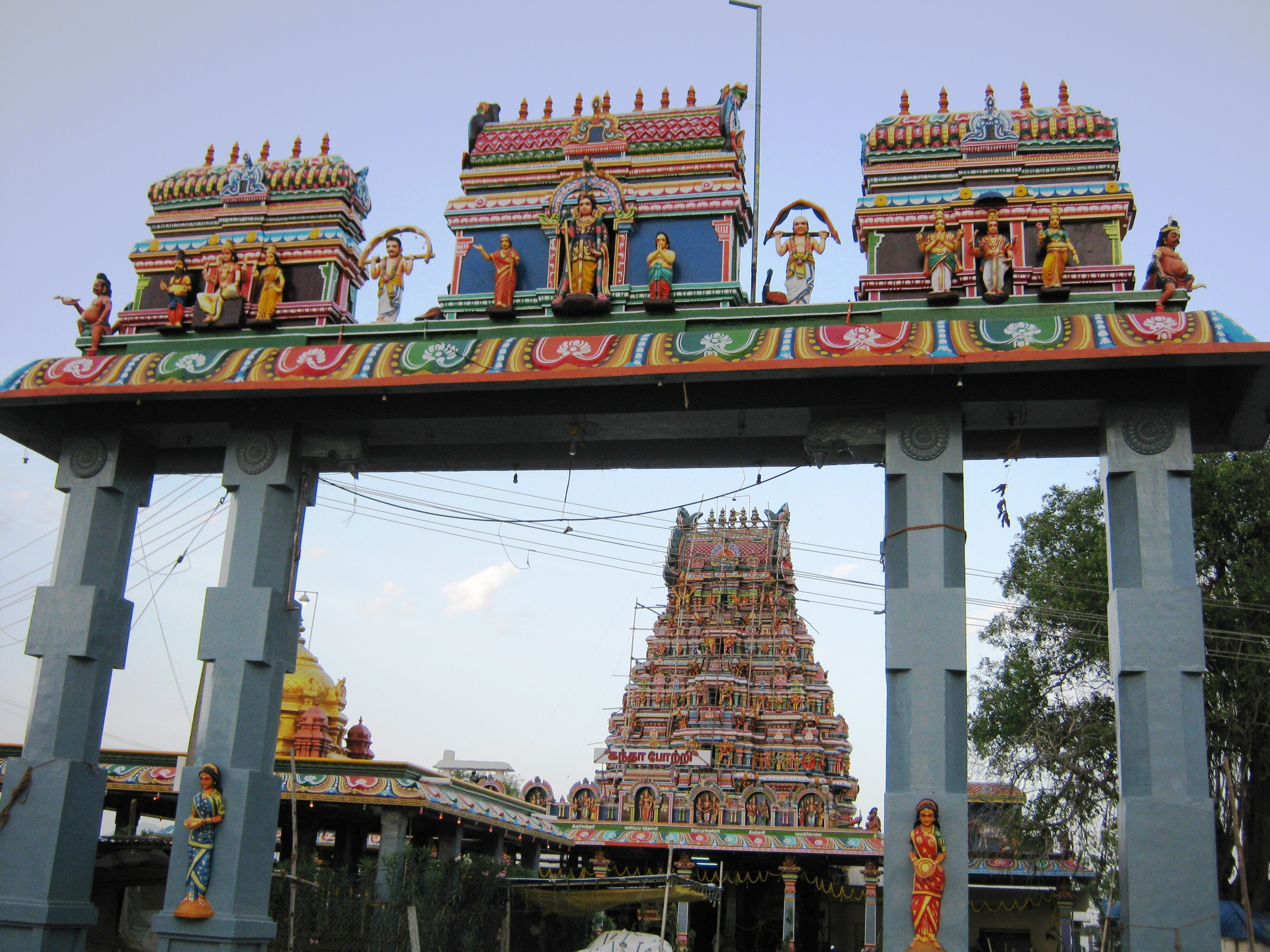
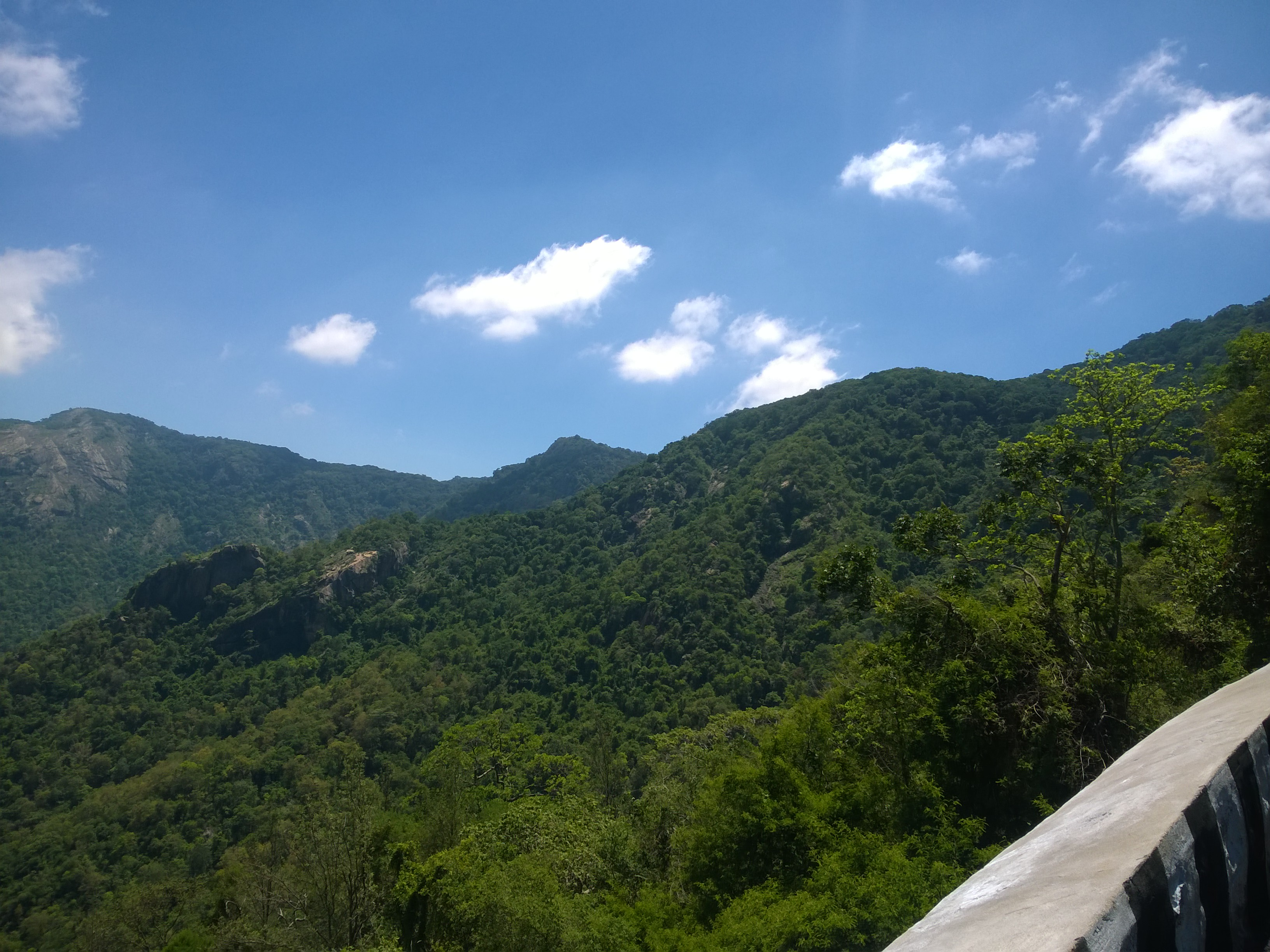
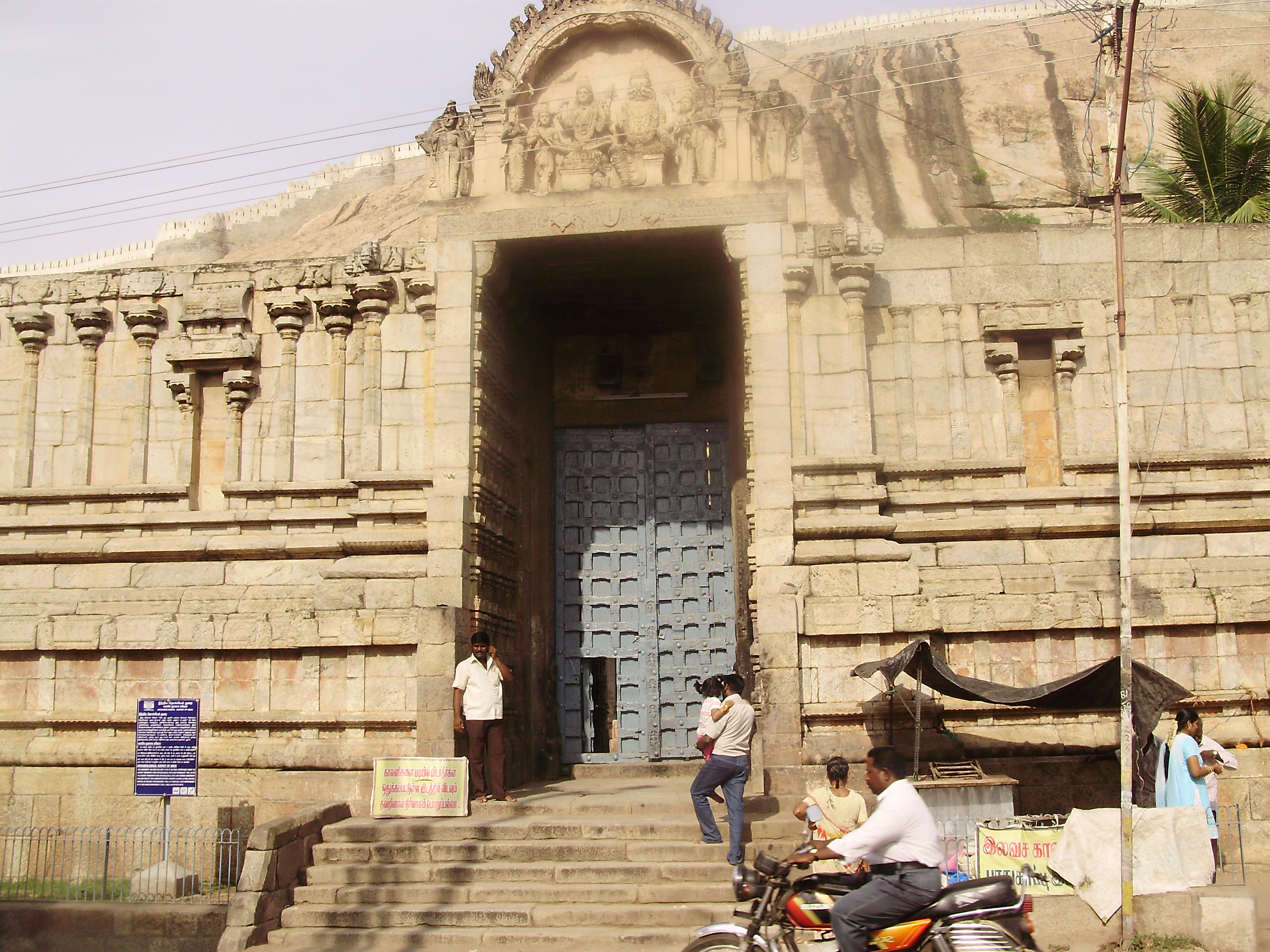
- Clockwise from top-left: View of Namakkal from Namakkal Fort, Tiruchengode Siva Temple, Kolli Hills, Sri Namagiri Thayar Sametha Sri Narasimhaswamy Temple from Namakkal, Sri Kandaswamy Temple in Mallasamudram

- Location in Tamil Nadu
- Namakkal district
- Coordinates: 11°13′8.4″N 78°10′1.2″E
- Country: India
- State: Tamil Nadu
- Region: Kongu Nadu
- Headquarters: Namakkal
- Taluks: Namakkal, Paramathi Velur, Rasipuram, Thiruchengode, Mohanur, Kolli Hills, Senthamangalam, Kumarapalayam

Government
  - District Collector: S. Uma, IAS
  - Superintendent of Police: S. Rajesh Kannan, IPS

Area
  - Total: 3,368.21 km^{2} (1,300.47 sq mi)

Population (2011)
  - Total: 1,726,601
  - Density: 512.617/km^{2} (1,327.67/sq mi)

Languages
  - Official: Tamil
- Time zone: UTC+5:30 (IST)
- PIN: 637xxx
- Telephone code: 04286
- ISO 3166 code: ISO 3166-2:IN
- Vehicle registration: TN-28, TN-88, TN-34
- Nearest districts: Salem, Trichy, Erode, Karur
- Central location: 11°13′N 78°10′E
- Website: namakkal.nic.in

Namakkal district is one of the 38 districts (an administrative district) in the state of Tamil Nadu, India. The district was bifurcated from Salem District with Namakkal city as headquarters on 25 July 1996 and started to function independently from 1 January 1997. The district has eight taluks (subdivisions): Tiruchengode, Namakkal, Rasipuram, Paramathi Velur, Senthamangalam, Kumarapalayam, Kolli Hills and Mohanur. It has two revenue divisions: Tiruchengode and Namakkal. As of 2011 census, Namakkal district had a population of 1,726,601 with a sex-ratio of 986 females for every 1,000 males and Tiruchengode is the largest city in terms of population. Namakkal district is geographically affiliated to Kongu Nadu region. The district is famous for its large poultry industry, egg production and lorry bodybuilding industry, for which it is often referred to as "Egg City" and "Transport Hub of South India".

== History ==
Valvil Ori is a Tamil king.He was one of the last seven patrons and king of the kolli hills in Sangam period who ruled Kollimalai and surrounding areas in 200 CE.. Adiyaman Kings have ruled this area until 8th to 9th century CE as few inscriptions mentions Narasimhaswamy Temple, Namakkal it as Adiyendra Vishnu Grham which evidently shows that the cave was excavated by the Satyaputra Kings, Another inscription in the temple not only confirms this but also mentions the king's name as Gunasila (Dated 500 CE). Historians believe it is possible that both the temples Narasimhaswamy Temple, Namakkal and Ranganatha temple located in Namakkal were built during the same period. Ardhanareeswarar Temple is also dated around 7th century CE, but does not have any Adhiyaman Kings Inscription. After the capture by Cholas, There were many wars between Cholas and Pandyas, Later the Hoysalas rose to power and had the control until the 14th century, followed by Vijayanagara Empire until 1565 CE. Then, the Allala Ilaya Nayakar Vettuva Gounder king came to power in 1623 CE under the Vijayanagara Kingdom. He build the Paramathi Fort with sand and stones on a 40- to 50-acre land.He also build jedarpalayam dam across the Cauvery river Two of the Poligans of Tirumalai Nayak, including Ramachandra Nayaka, ruled the Salem area. The Namakkal fort is reported to have been built by Ramchandra Nayaka after about 1635 CE.

== Geography ==
Namakkal district covers an area of 3,368.21 km^{2}. The district is bounded by Salem district on the north; on the east by, Tiruchirapalli District, by Karur District on the south and on the west by Erode district. The average annual rainfall is 716.54 mm. This district receives rainfall mainly from North East Monsoon.

Namakkal District comes under the North Western Agro climatic zone of Tamil Nadu.Tiruchengode taluk alone is placed under Western Agro-climatic zone. The forest cover has an area of 512.5 km^{2}, which is 15.4% of the total area. Temperature ranges between maximum of 40 °C and minimum of 18 °C.

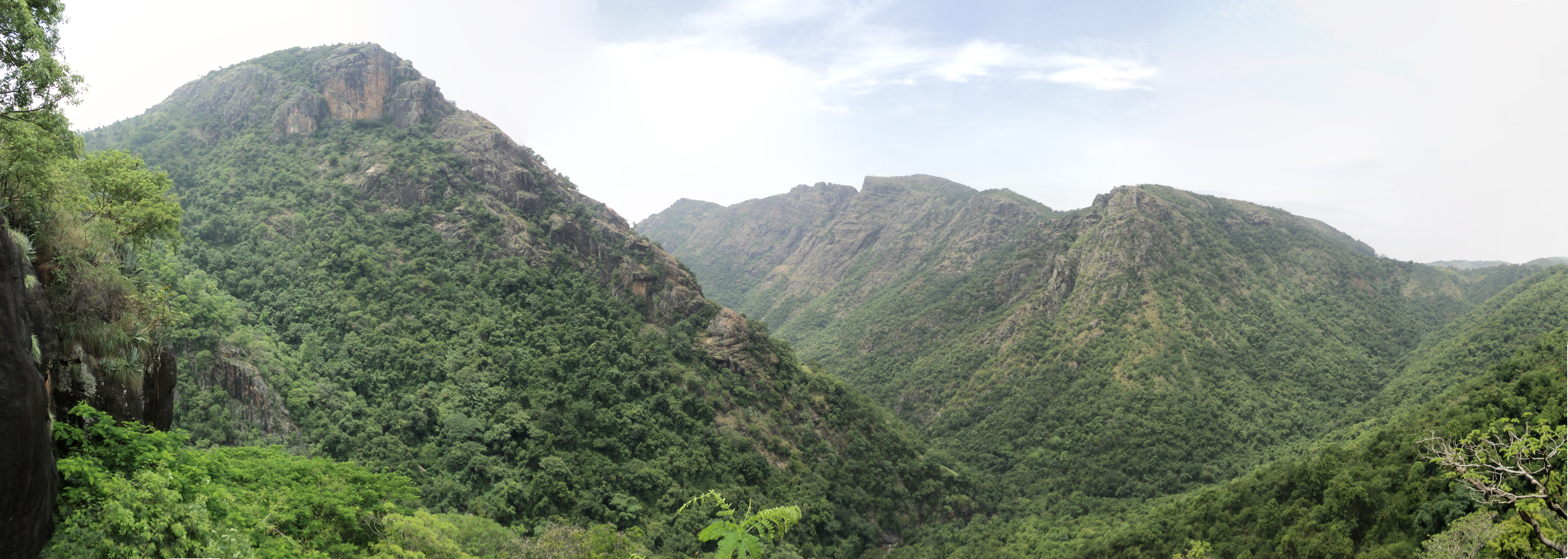
Panoramic View of Kolli Hills

Besides the above two zones, Kolli Hills (a part of the Eastern Ghats mountain range) and a few isolated hills and ridges are scattered over Namakkal, Rasipuram, and Tiruchengode and along with the valleys and rolling hills, make up the characteristic topography of the district.

The river Kaveri flows south and southwest hugging the district's borders with Karur and Erode. The other rivers flowing through the district are Aiyaru, Karaigottan Aaru and Thirumanimutharu.

=== Irrigation ===
The district is situated in the dividing portion of two watersheds between Cauvery and the Vellar System with the Taluks of Attur, Rasipuram and Namakkal on the East and Salem, Omalur and Mettur on the West. Mettur East Bank canal irrigates Pallipalayam Block with an area of 4,585 Ha. Rajavaikal canal irrigates an area of 4,215 Ha. Mohanur vaikal irrigates about 355 Ha. Kumarapalayam vaikal irrigates about 1,146 ha (2,830 acres) and Poiyeri vaikal irrigates about 323 ha (800 acres).

== Demographics ==
Historical population
Year	Pop.	±% p.a.
1901	470,628	—
1911	487,144	+0.35%
1921	525,770	+0.77%
1931	591,864	+1.19%
1941	705,110	+1.77%
1951	848,507	+1.87%
1961	866,530	+0.21%
1971	996,429	+1.41%
1981	1,172,736	+1.64%
1991	1,322,715	+1.21%
2001	1,493,462	+1.22%
2011	1,726,601	+1.46%

Religions in Namakkal district (2011)
Religion	Percent
Hinduism	96.93%
Islam	1.88%
Christianity	0.98%
Other or not stated	0.21%

According to 2011 census, Namakkal district had a population of 1,726,601 with a sex-ratio of 986 females for every 1,000 males, much above the national average of 929. 40.32% of the population lived in urban areas. A total of 150,699 were under the age of six, constituting 78,754 males and 71,945 females. Scheduled Castes and Scheduled Tribes accounted for 20.00% and 3.30% of the population respectively. The average literacy of the district was 68.12%, compared to the national average of 72.99%. The district had a total of 475,511 households. There were a total of 898,245 workers, comprising 152,497 cultivators, 228,614 main agricultural labourers, 35,156 in house hold industries, 422,885 other workers, 59,093 marginal workers, 5,976 marginal cultivators, 25,112 marginal agricultural labourers, 3,641 marginal workers in household industries and 24,364 other marginal workers.

Languages of Namakkal district (2011)
1. Tamil (87.1%)
2. Telugu (8.97%)
3. Kannada (2.07%)
4. Urdu (1.05%)
5. Others (0.83%)

At the time of the 2011 census, 87.08% of the population spoke Tamil, 8.97% Telugu, 2.07% Kannada and 1.05% Urdu as their first language.

== Administraive Divisions ==
=== Revenue Divisions and Taluks ===
Tiruchengode Revenue Division:

- Komarapalayam
- Tiruchengode
- Paramathi-Velur

Namakkal Revenue Division:

- Namakkal
- Mohanur
- Senthamangalam
- Kolli Hills
- Rasipuram,

=== Municipal Corporation ===
- Namakkal Municipal Corporation

=== Municipalities ===
- Tiruchengode
- Komarapalayam
- Pallipalayam
- Paramathi Velur
- Rasipuram
- Mohanur

== Politics ==
District	No.	Constituency	Name	Party	Alliance	Remarks
Namakkal	92	Rasipuram (SC)	Logesh Tamilselvan	TVK	TVK+	Cabinet Minister
Namakkal	93	Senthamangalam (ST)	P. Chandrasekar	TVK	TVK+	
Namakkal	94	Namakkal	C. S. Dileep	TVK	TVK+	
Namakkal	95	Paramathi-Velur	S. Sekar	AIADMK	NDA	Supported TVK; Later declared support for EPS
Namakkal	96	Tiruchengode	K. G. Arunraj	TVK	TVK+	Cabinet Minister
Namakkal	97	Kumarapalayam	C. Vijayalakshmi	TVK	TVK+	Cabinet Minister

== Industry and economy ==
=== Agriculture ===
The main occupation for most of the people in the district is agriculture, with a gross cropped area of around 336,700 Ha, out of which about 60,939 Ha are irrigated and about 80,598 Ha are rainfed. The cultivation generally depends on monsoon rains, wells, and tanks. Major soil in this district is red soil (77%). Nearly 90 percent of the cultivated area is under food crops. The principal cereal crops of this district are paddy, cholam, cumbu and ragi. Panivaragu, Kuthiraivali, Samai Varagu and Thinai are some of the millets cultivated. Among pulses, the major crops are redgram, blackgram, greengram and horsegram. Among oil, seeds, groundnut, castor, and gingelly (sesame) occupy important places. Of the commercial crops, sugarcane, cotton and tapioca are some of the important. Using tapioca as raw material about 350 factory units are engaged in the production of Starch and Sago in Namakkal District. Around 800 jaggery manufacturing units were located around ParamathiVelur.

=== Lorry body-building ===
Namakkal district is noted for truck and lorry external body building industry which dates back to 1956. Nationwide Namakkal is known for body building for truck, trailer, tanker and rig unit. Throughout India, Tiruchengode is known for its body building industry for trucks, trailers, tankers, and rig units. Finished trucks and rig units are exported to foreign countries from Namakkal. Nearly 25,000 people are employed, both directly and indirectly, in truck body building activity and about 300 units in Namakkal and 100 units in Tiruchengode are engaged in this activity.

Ashok Leyland's Driver Training Institute in Namakkal (right in the trucking heartland of Tamil Nadu) was the first of its kind and has served as a beacon to lead the way in the training of drivers. Accessible from Erode, Salem and Trichy, and spread over 25 acres, the campus includes a driving range with every conceivable road configuration. A building accommodates multiple classrooms, a library, a model room, a laboratory and a cafeteria with an open-air theatre attached. The roads come with electronic signals, signs, markings and streetlights for night driving – everything, in fact, that drivers will encounter on the highways.

=== Poultry ===
Poultry plays an important role in the economy of Namakkal which has an astounding number of 29.3 million fowls and 32.4 million eggs produced every day, accounting for a bulk of supply of poultry products to neighbouring industries. Namakkal produces about 65% of the total egg output of Tamil Nadu. About 1,500 Poultry/Cattle Feed manufacturing units are also in existence. Mostly every poultry unit has put up their own feed manufacturing unit.

=== Others ===
Nearly 176 Sago factories are located in and around the Rasipuram Taluk. Bore-wells and textile are the main business in Tiruchengode. Nearly 37 spinning mills and more than 10,000 power-looms are functioning in Tiruchengode. One sugar mill and one paper mill were functioning under Private Sector.

== Education ==
Veterinary College and Research Institute, Namakkal (a constituent unit of Tamil Nadu Veterinary and Animal Sciences University) is located in Mohanur Taluk. It also has an Animal Feed Analysis and Quality Assurance Laboratory (AFAQAL). All the arts and science colleges in the district are affiliated to Periyar University, Salem. A new government medical college had constructed and opened.

== Culture and tourism ==
=== Namakkal Rock Fort and Hindu temples ===
The town of Namakkal is built around a rock fort. The rock fort is on the summit of the rock, and the remnants in brick and stone still bear the brunt of the skirmishes to lay siege to the fort by the Cholas in the 9th century. There are two rock–cut cave temples located on both sides of the hill dedicated to Narasimhaswamy and Ranganathaswamy. The caves were constructed by Adhiyaman rulers who ruled over Kongu Region during the 7th century. The Temple has been declared as monuments under the preservation of Monuments and sites Act 1958 and being administered by the HR&CE department of Government. A temple dedicated to the Goddess Namagiri Amman is situated within the temple complex of the Narasimha Swamy kovil.

The famous Namakkal Digambara Anjaneyar Temple, housing an 18-foot-tall Hanuman statue is located opposite to the Narasimhaswamy temple. It is believed that the Hanuman statue keeps growing and to stop the growth a priest put a magic needle at the top of the statue's head. Hanuman statue carved out of a single stone at this temple.

=== Tiruchengode ===
Tiruchengode is 35 km from Namakkal. It is one of the seven Sivasthalams in Kongunadu. The Ardhanareeswarar temple is located on a hill. The presiding deity is depicted as half-male and half-female, vertically to represent Shiva and Parvati worshipped as one form. It is considered one of the oldest temples in this region.

Tiruchegode is the olden Poondurainadu in Kongunadu. Tiruchengode olden name is Thirukodimadachengondurur.

=== Kollimalai (Kolli Hills) ===
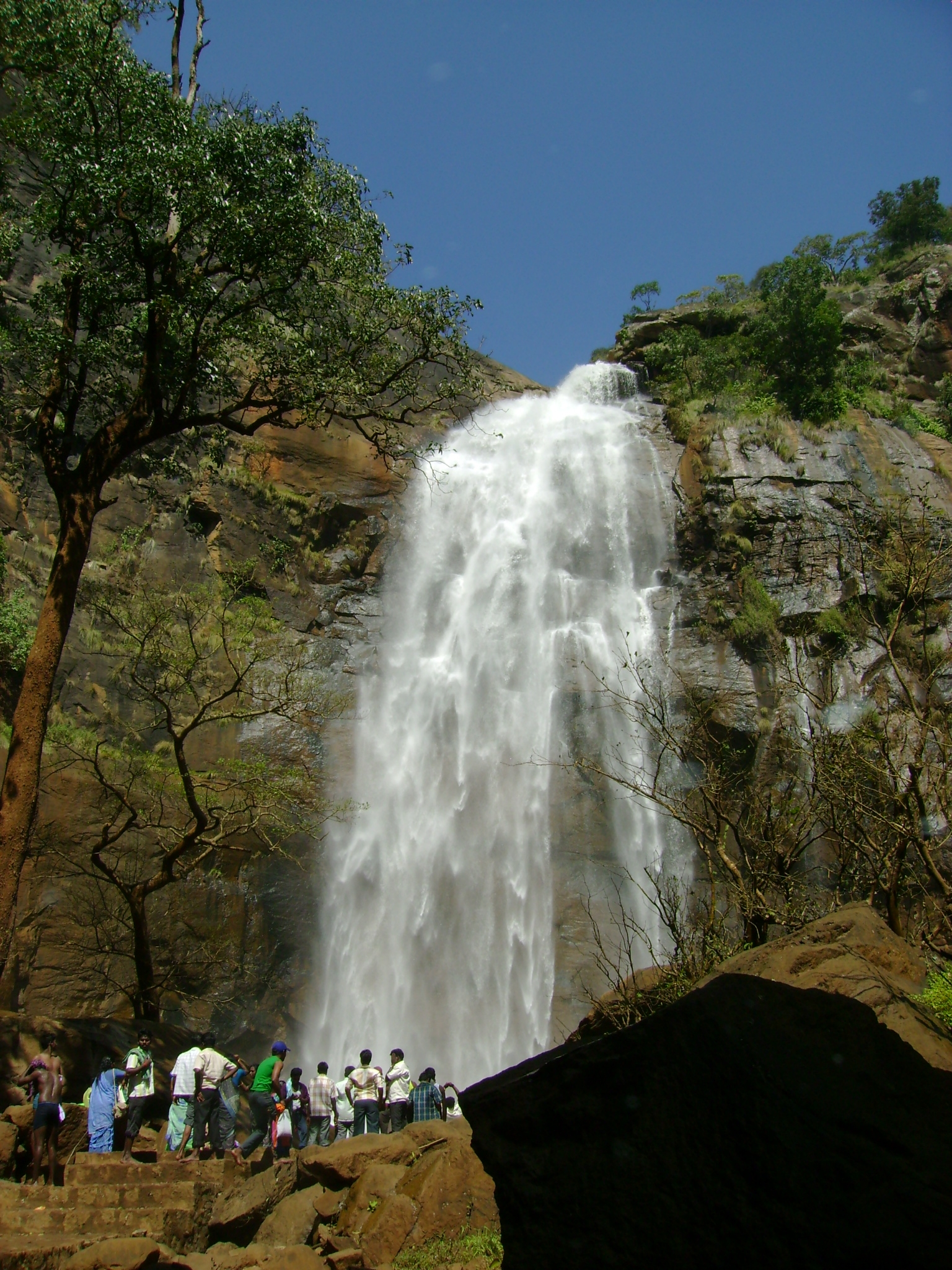
Water falls in Kolli Hills

Kolli Hills are at an altitude of 1,200 m (3,900 ft) in the Namakkal District and are 45 km from Namakkal town. The Kolli hills are featured in several works of classical Tamil literature such as Silappathigaram, Manimekalai, Purananuru and Ainkurnuru. The region was ruled by Valvil Ori whose valor and marksmanship are sung by several poets, and his exploits are a popular part of folklore.

There are three reserved forests that are controlled by the Government of Tamil Nadu, namely Ariyur Solai, Kundur Nadu and Puliancholai. It is not correct to regard the name Kolli Hills (Tamil: kolli noi- killer disease) as being due to the incidence of deadly diseases. It is because early literature records the existence of a deity called Kollippavai on top of these hills.

The hills are known for medicinal herbs and plants that grow in abundance on their slopes. The Arapaleswarar Temple, the Horticulture Farm, the herbal farm, Agaya Gangai waterfalls, boat house, Peryaswamy Temple, Ettukai Amman Temple, Pineapple farms, View Point, and the Telescope House are the places to visit for the interested tourist. Attukalkilangu soup and raw was sold in this hills. The Valvil Ori festival is organised there every year during the month of August.

The Arapaleeswarar temple is believed to have a secret path to the Shiva temple in Rasipuram. This Shiva temple is said to have been built by Valvil Ori king in the 1st or 2nd century CE when he ruled this area. "Arappaleeswara Sathakam" is the poem which praises the Lord Arappaleeswarar.

=== Jedarpalayam Dam ===
Jedarpalayam Dam is located in Kabilarmalai Panchayat Union of Namakkal District. It is located about 36 km from Namakkal. The dam is constructed across the River Cauvery and it is constructed by The king Allala ilaya nayagan, a Vettuvan king and also he make a vaaikal called Raja vaaikal. This dam is having a water storage area for boating.

== Transport ==
Transport is the major field of work in Namakkal. A large number of bulk carriers and lorries run through all over India from Namakkal. Many lorry (truck) body building workshops are located in Namakkal.More than 5000 lorry workshops are present in this city. Egg production in this district is largely facilitated by the lorry transport. It is the main centre for linking other districts via bus routes, to the North (Salem, Villupuram, Dharmapuri, Krishnagiri and Bangalore), East (Tiruchirapalli, Thanjavur, Thiruvarur and Nagapattinam), South (Karur, Dindugal, Madurai, Tiunelveli and Kanyakumari) and the West (Erode, Coimbatore, Tirupur and Nilgiris). The train route between Karur and Salem Junction saves fuel and time for transportation of goods. Government buses are maintained by TNSTC-Salem division. The national highway NH-44 which runs through the city.

== Notable people ==
- Natarajan Chandrasekaran, who hails from Mohanur, is the chairman of the Tata group. He was previously the CEO and managing director of Tata Consultancy Services.
- Venkatarama Ramalingam Pillai, the famous modern Tamil poet, a Gandhian independence fighter and a Padma Bhushan awardee, was also born in Mohanur.
- P. Subbarayan (11 September 1889 – 6 October 1962) was an Indian politician, freedom fighter and diplomat and was the Chief Minister of Madras Presidency.
- General Paramasiva Prabhakar Kumaramangalam, DSO, MBE-6th Chief of Indian army (1913–2000)
- RK Narayan - Indian writer
- RK Laxman - Indian Cartoonist

== Villages ==
- Agrahara Mettupatty
- Akkiyampatty
- Chinna Veppanatham
- Elandakuttai
- Kallippalayam
- Moolapalayam
- Nettayampalayam
- Ottakulampudur
- Pavithrampudur
- Thalambadi
- Thengaperumalpalayam
- Vadugam
- Velagoundampatti
