= Valayapatti A. R. Subramaniam =

Indian classical musician

- Born: Valayapatti, Pudukottai district, Tamil Nadu, India
- Occupations: Classical musician Percussionist
- Known for: Thavil
- Children: Sons: S.Manivannan (Engineer), S.Malarvannan (Classical musician) Daughters: 2
- Parent: Arumugham
- Awards: Padma Shri; Sangeet Natak Akademi Award; Sangeet Kalanidhi Award; Thavil Ulaga Sooriyan

Valayapatti A. R. Subramaniam is an Indian classical musician and percussionist, considered by many as one of the foremost prominent exponents of thavil also known as dolu, a traditional percussion instrument in Carnatic music, accompanying windpipe instruments such as nadaswaram, saxophone, clarinet, etc, and string instruments like violin, mandolin, etc. He was awarded the Madras Music Academy's Sangeetha Kalanidhi in 2009. He is a recipient of the Sangeet Natak Akademi Award. The Government of India awarded him the fourth highest civilian honour of the Padma Shri, in 2007, for his contributions to Music.

== Biography ==
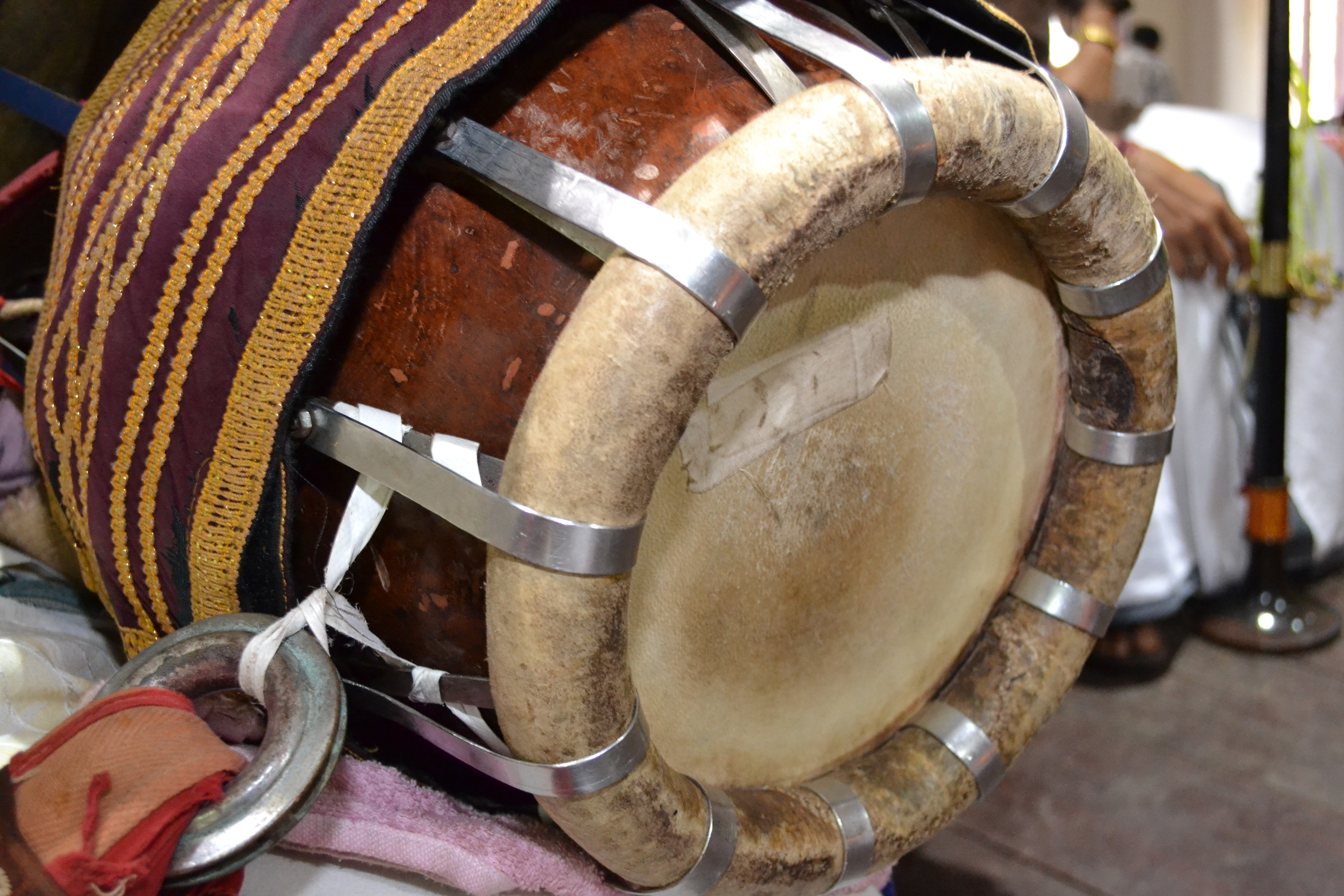
Thavil

Subramaniam was born in Valayapatti in Pudukottai district of Tamil Nadu to Arumugham, a known nadaswaram performer and learnt playing the instrument from his father. Later, he trained in thavil under Mannargudi Rajagopala Pillai and started performing as an accompanist to several known nadaswaram players such as Thiruveezhimizhalai brothers, Sembanarkoil brothers, Karukurichi P. Arunachalam, Namagiripettai Krishnan and Thirumeignanam Nataraja Sundaram Pillai. Soon, he became a regular accompanist to Thiruvizha Jayashankar and Kunnakudi Vaidyanathan and is reported to have performed at over 3000 concerts with the latter.

The Sangeet Natak Akademi selected Subramaniam for their annual music award in 1988 and the Government of India awarded him the civilian honour of Padma Shri in 2007. Three years later, he received the Sangeeta Kalanidhi title from the Madras Music Academy, thus becoming the first accompanist and Thavil player to receive the award. He is also a recipient of the Thavil Ulaga Sooriyan title.

== See also ==
- Haridwaramangalam A. K. Palanivel
- Thiruvalaputhur T A Kaliyamurthy
