= Nilathingal Thundam Perumal temple =

Hindu temple in Tamil Nadu, India

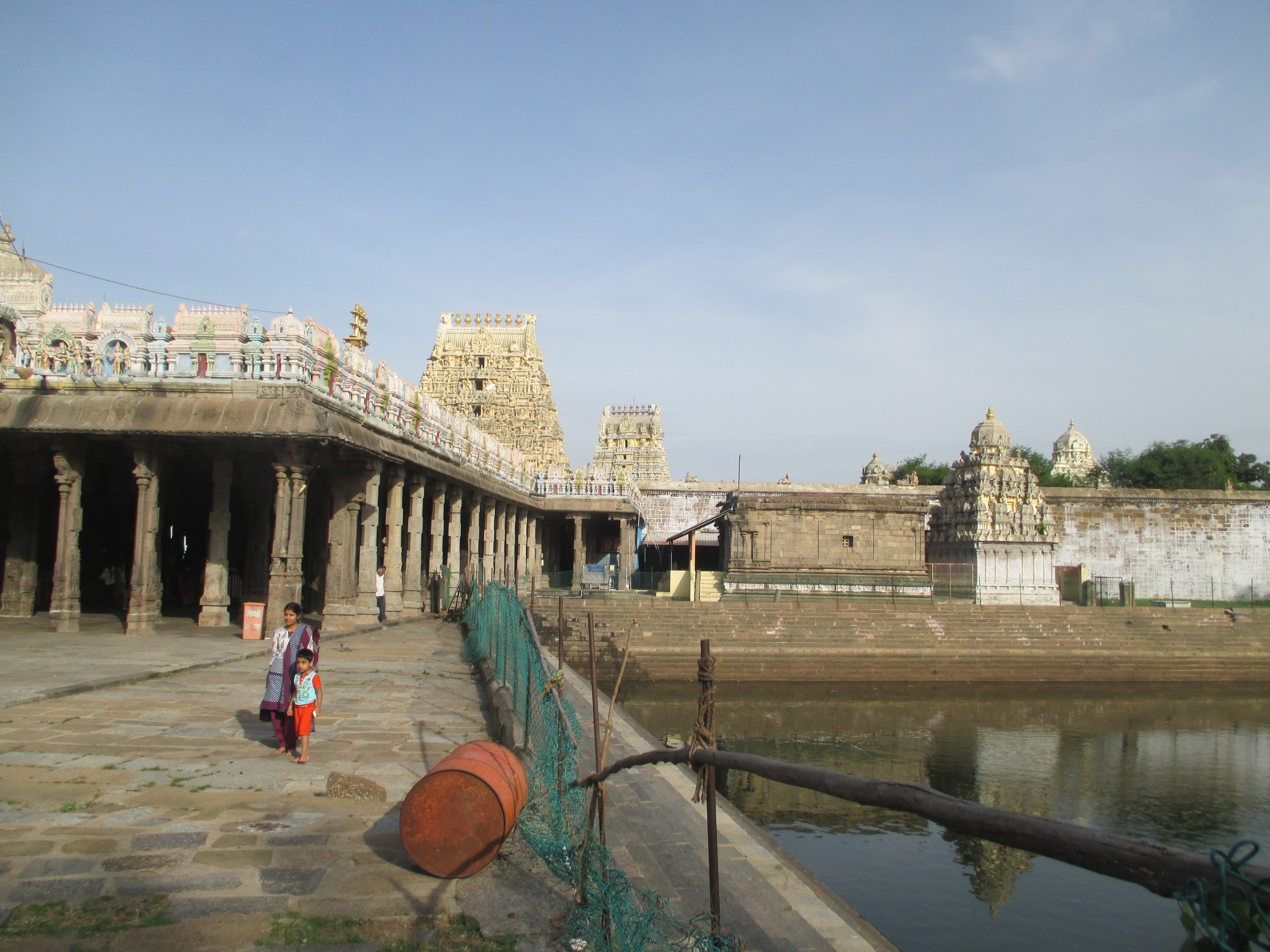

Religion
- Affiliation: Hinduism
- Deity: Nilathingal Thunda Perumal (Vishnu); Nilathingal Thunda Nayagi (Lakshmi)

Location
- Location: Kanchipuram
- State: Tamil Nadu
- Country: India
- Interactive map of Nilathingal Thundam Perumal temple
- Coordinates: 12°50′51″N 79°42′00″E

Architecture
- Type: Dravidian architecture
- Creator: Pallava, Chola kings

Nilathingal Thundam Perumal temple (also called Chandrasoodeswarar Perumal temple) is a Hindu temple dedicated to Vishnu, located in Kanchipuram in the state of Tamil Nadu, India. The temple is located in a shrine in Ekambareswarar Temple, the largest temple in the town of Kanchipuram, located in the northern part of the town. The temple gopuram (gateway tower) is 59 m tall, which is one of the tallest gopurams in India.

The temple is glorified in the Nalayira Divya Prabandham, the early medieval Tamil canon of the Alvar saints from the 6th–9th centuries CE. It is one of the 108 Divya Desams dedicated to Vishnu, who is worshiped as Nilathingal Thunda Perumal and his consort Lakshmi as Nilathingal Thunda Nayagi.

Six daily rituals and two major yearly festivals are held at the temple, of which the Vaikuntha Ekadashi festival, celebrated during the Tamil month of Margali (December–January), is the most prominent. The temple is maintained and administered by the Hindu Religious and Endowment Board of the Government of Tamil Nadu. Unlike other Vaishnavite temples where a Vaishnavite priest officiates, the temples has a Saiva priest as it in inside a Shiva temple.

== Legend ==
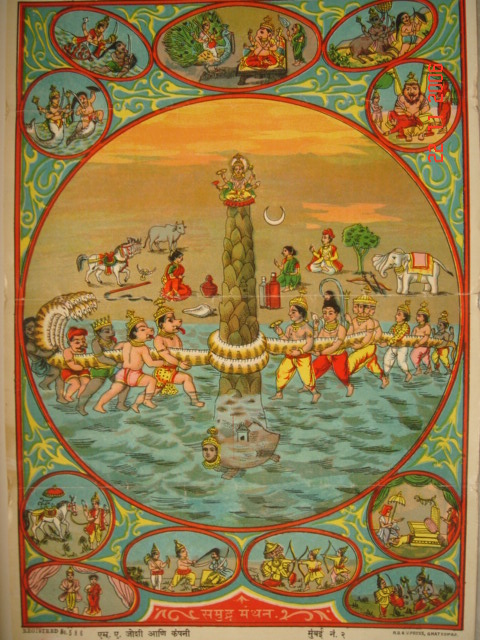
Legend indicating churning of Ocean of Milk

Parvati, the consort of Shiva was doing penance under the temple's ancient mango tree near Vegavathi river. In order to test her devotion Shiva sent fire on her. The goddess Parvati prayed to her brother, Vishnu for help. Vishnu took the crescent from Shiva's head and reflected the rays which then cooled down the tree as well as Parvati. Shiva wanted to test Parvati again and sent the river Ganga (Ganges) to disrupt her penance. Parvati prayed to Ganga and convinced her that both of them were sisters and so she should not harm her. Subsequently, Ganga did not disturb her penance and Parvati made a Shiva Linga out of sand to get united with Shiva. Shiva came to be known as Ekambareswarar or "Lord of Mango Tree" and Vishnu as Nilathingal Thundam.

As per Hindu legend, Parvati was doing penance at this place to attain the blessings of her husband Shiva. She sought the help of Vishnu to help her in the cause. Vishnu appeared as Vamana with a conch and disc and radiated light as moon. It is believed that Vishnu appeared for Chandra (moon) and Shiva worshipped Vishnu here.

== History ==
The Ekambareswarar temple is one of the most ancient in India having been in existence since at least 600 CE. A 2nd-century CE Tamil poetry speaks of Kama kottam, and the Kumara kottam (currently the Kamakashi Amman temple and the Subramanya temple). Initially temple was built by Pallavas. The Vedantist Kachiyapper served as a priest at the temple. The existing structure then, was pulled down and rebuilt by the later Chola Kings. Adi Sankara, the 10th-century saint got Kanchipuram remodeled along with expansion of this temple along with Kamakshi Amman temple and Varadaraja Perumal Temple with the help of local rulers. The Vijayanagara kings, during the 15th century, also made lot of contributions to the temple and later developed by Vallal Pachiyappa Mudaliar used to go regularly from Chennai to Kanchipuram to worship in this temple, he spent significant money he amazed during British rule on the temple renovation, Pachiyappa Mudaliar seated at horse back can be seen in the temple pillar. At the later stage a similar temple with same name Ekambareswarar was constructed in Chennai by Pachiappa Mudaliar in order to avoid travelling time to Kanchipuram. The Archaeological Survey of India report of 1905–06 indicates widespread renovation activities carried out in the temple by Nattukottai Chettiar. In modern times, the temple is maintained and administered by the Hindu Religious and Endowment Board of the Government of Tamil Nadu.

== Architecture ==
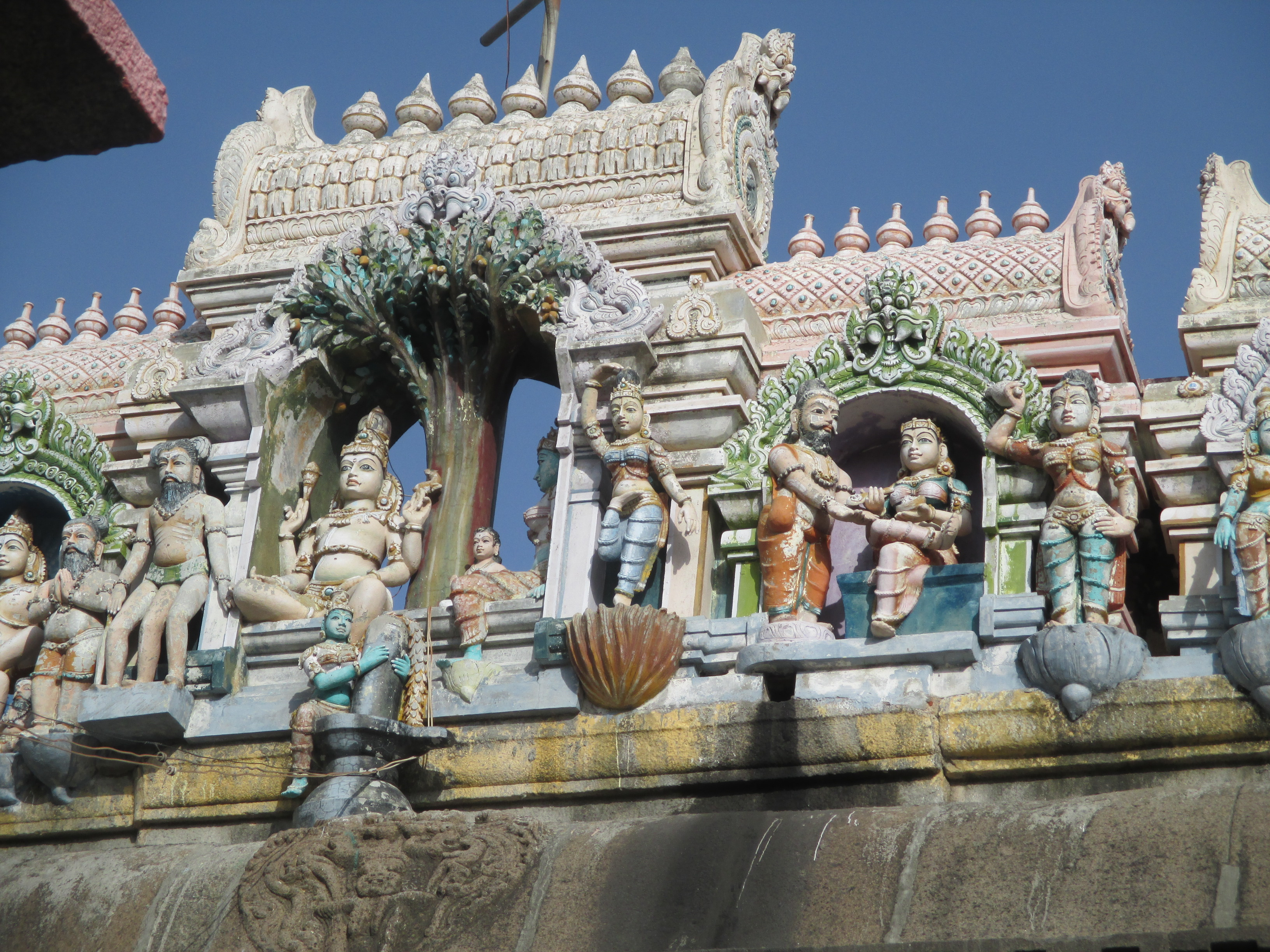
Legend of the temple in a stucco image

The temple is located on the first precinct around the Ekambareswarar Temple, located to the South West of the sanctum. Nilathingal Thundam Perumal is seen in standing posture facing West in the shrine under Purushasuktha Vimana. There is no separate shrine for the consort Nilanthingal Nayagi, neither there is any separate festival image. The shrine faces West, while the Ekamabareswarar shrine faces the East.

The Ekambareswarar temple covers an area of over 9.3 hectares (23 acres). Reaching a height of 59 m (194 ft), the temple's Raja gopuram (the entrance tower to the temple) is one of the tallest in South India. One notable feature of the temple is the Aayiram Kaal Mandapam, or the "hallway with a thousand pillars", which was built by the Vijayanagara Kings. The temple's inner walls are decorated with an array of 1,008 Siva lingams. The temple has five prakarams (or courtyards) and has a thousand-pillared hall. Kampai Tirtha, the temple tank is believed to have an underground holy river. The fourth courtyard contains a small Ganesha temple and a pond. The third courtyard contains lot of smaller shrines. The sanctum sanctorum contains the lingam along with the image of Shiva.

== Religious importance ==
Unlike other Vishnu temples that have Vaishnavite priests, this temple has only Saivite priests as the temple is located on the premises of a Shiva temple. There are no separate festivals celebrated for the presiding deity. The temple is revered in Nalayira Divya Prabandham, the 7th–9th century Vaishnava canon, by Thirumangai Alvar in one hymn. The temple is classified as a Divya Desam, one of the 108 Vishnu temples that are mentioned in the book.

The consort of Nilathingal Thundam Perumal (also called Chandrasoodeswarar Perumal) is called Nilathingal Thunda Nayagi (also called Ver Oruvar Illa Valli). The temple is one of the three rare Divyadesams, with the other being Govindaraja Perumal Temple and Thirukalvanur, that are housed in a Shiva temple. Only Saivite priests perform rituals in the temple.

== Festivals and religious practices ==
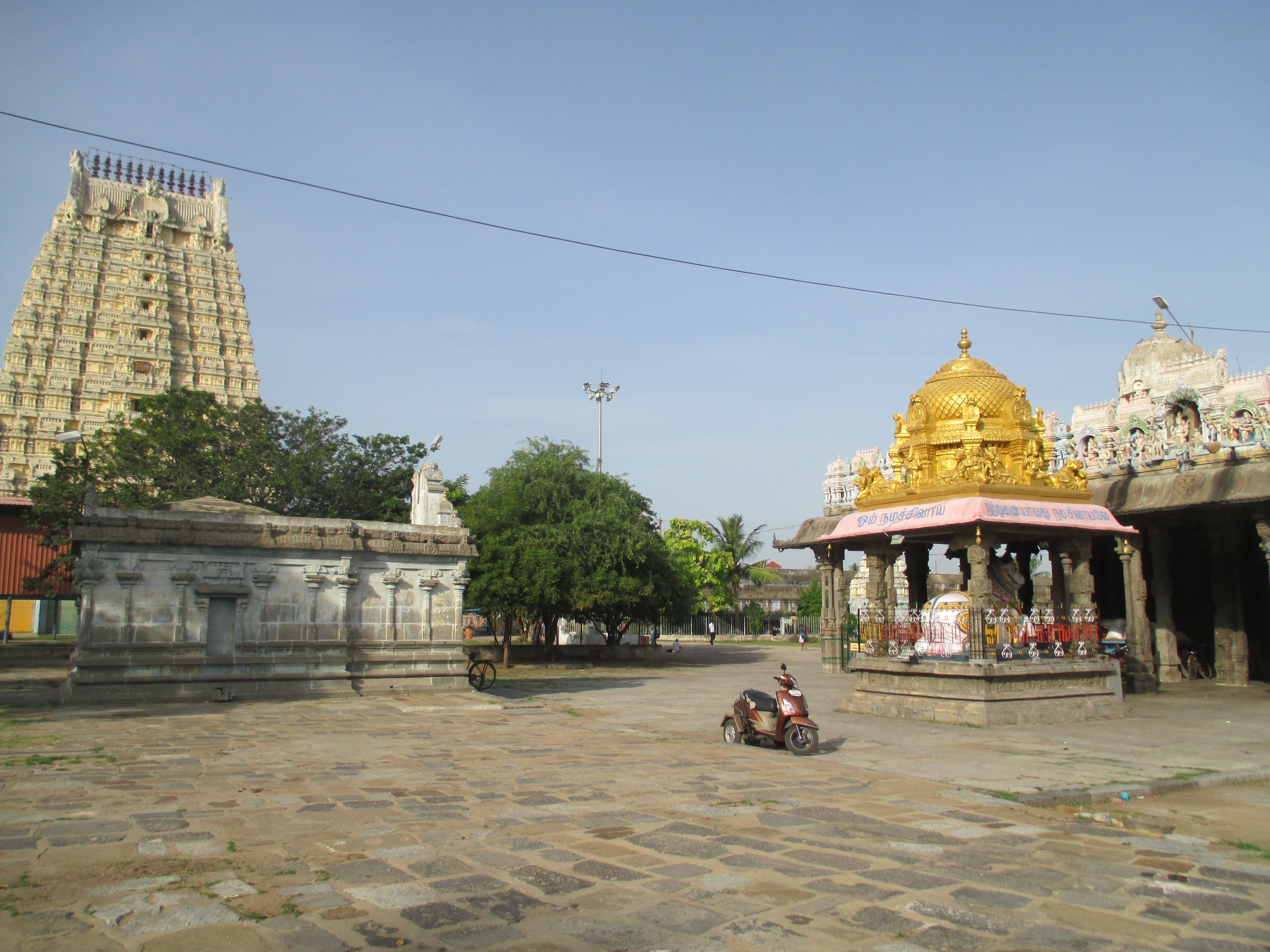
Image of the temple tower

The temple priests perform the pooja (rituals) during festivals and on a daily basis. Being inside the premises of a Shiva temple, the priests belong to the Saivite community. The temple rituals are performed six times a day: Ushathkalam at 7:00 a.m., Kalasanthi at 8:00 a.m., Uchikalam at 12:00 p.m., Sayarakshai at 6:00 p.m., Irandamkalam at 7:00 p.m. and Ardha Jamam at 10:00 p.m. Each ritual has three steps: alangaram (decoration), neivethanam (food offering) and deepa aradanai (waving of lamps) for both Govindarajan and Pundarikavalli. During the last step of worship, nagaswaram (pipe instrument) and tavil (percussion instrument) are played, religious instructions in the Vedas (sacred text) are recited by priests, and worshippers prostrate themselves in front of the temple mast. There are weekly, monthly and fortnightly rituals performed in the temple. The 10-day Vaikunta Ekadasi festival celebrated during the Tamil month of Margazhi (December - January) is the most prominent festival celebrated in the temple. There are special poojas performed during every new moon day.
