= Kumarakottam Temple =

Kumarakottam temple
- Subramaniya swāmi temple
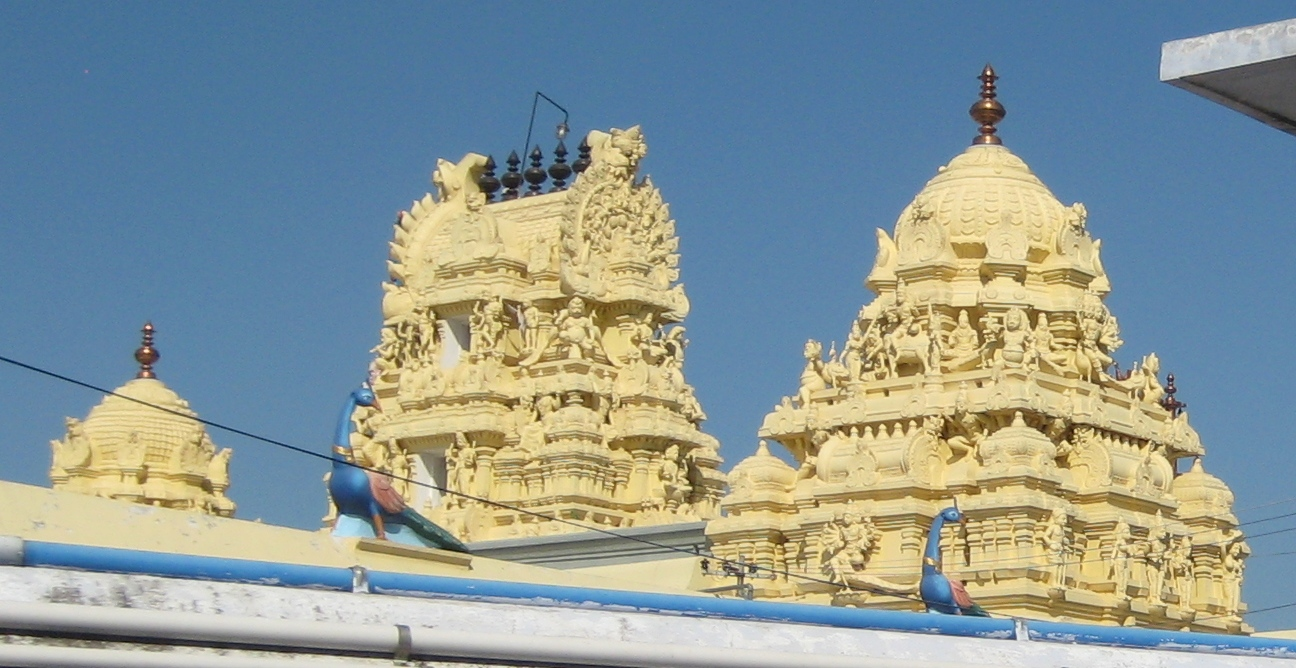
- Kumarakottam temple towers

- Location in Tamil Nadu

Religion
- Affiliation: Hinduism
- District: Kānchipuram district
- Deity: Subramanya Swāmi (Murugan)
- Festival: Kandha Shashti

Location
- Location: Kānchipuram city
- State: Tamil Nadu
- Country: India
- Interactive map of Kumarakottam temple
- Coordinates: 12.841°N 79.701°E

Architecture
- Type: Dravidian architecture (Pallava)
- Completed: rebuilt 1915 CE.

Website
- kumarakottammurugantemple.tnhrce.in

The Kumara kottam Temple is a Hindu temple in Kānchipuram, Tamil Nādu, India. It is dedicated to Lord murugan, the Hindu war god and the son of the gods Shiva and his mother Pārvathi. The temple is also known as the Subramaniya Swāmi temple. The ancient temple was rebuilt in its present form in 1915 CE. The temple is one of the 21 major temples in Kānchipuram and is an important pilgrimage centre. Saint Aruna giri nādhar has sung hymns in praise of the Murugan icon of this temple.

== Location ==
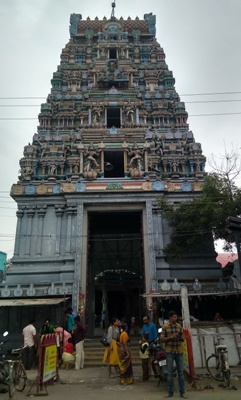
Rajagopura of the Kumarakottam Temple

The Kumara kottam temple is located on the main Rāja Street. It is said to form a cluster with Ekāmbareswarar temple and the Kāmākshi Amman temple but each temple has its own liturgical identity. The Murugan temple is located between the temples of his parents – the Ekāmbareswarar temple dedicated to Shiva and the Kāmākshi Amman temple dedicated to Kāmākshi, an aspect of Pārvathi. Symbolically, this setting represents the iconography of Somāskandha, an aspect of Shiva where he is depicted with Murugan and Pārvathi. The child Murugan is depicted seated between his parents. This representation led to the cult of Somāskandha. All temples in Kānchipuram are stated to be dedicated to one extended family of gods.

== Religious significance ==
The temple legend in the Kandha Purānam – the Tamil version of the Skanda Purāna which is mainly devoted to Murugan (also known as Skandha or Kandha) – states that Murugan had imprisoned the creator-god Brahmā here for the latter's ignorance of Om, the single syllable mantra which is sacred in Hinduism and himself assumed the role of the creator in this place. However, Murugan's father Shiva had ordered him to release Brahmā. When Murugan realized his mistake in not obeying his father's instruction, he did penance before a Linga (the aniconic symbol of Shiva), which subsequently was worshipped by the name of Devasenāpathīsar, literally, the Lord who was worshipped by Devasenāpathi (an epithet of Murugan as the commander-in-chief of the gods). In another version it is said that the penitent Brahmā is said to have been released by Shiva after he worshipped Murugan after learning his lessons in humility.

== Features ==
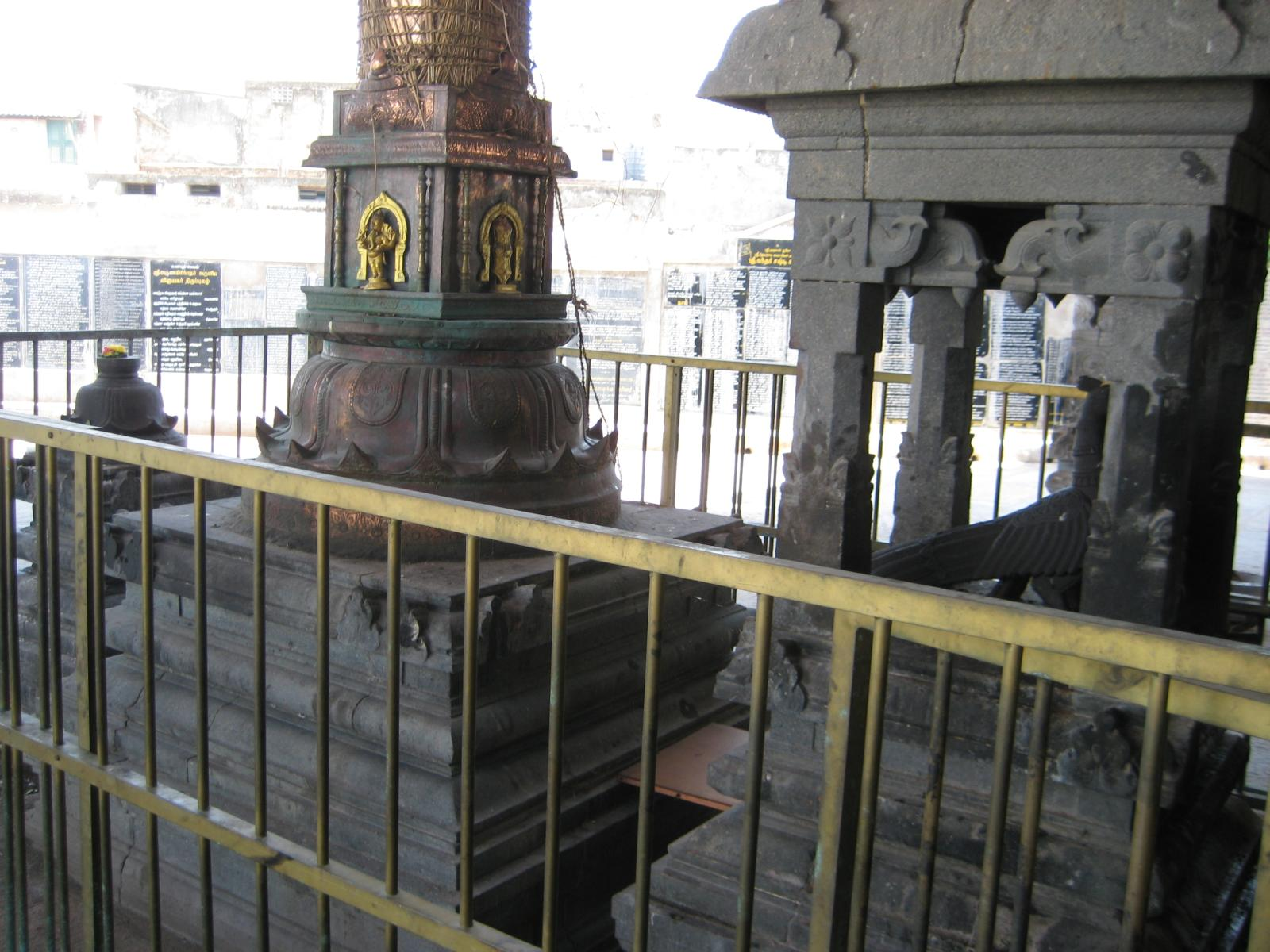
Kodi Kambam (Flagpost) of the Kumarakottam Temple

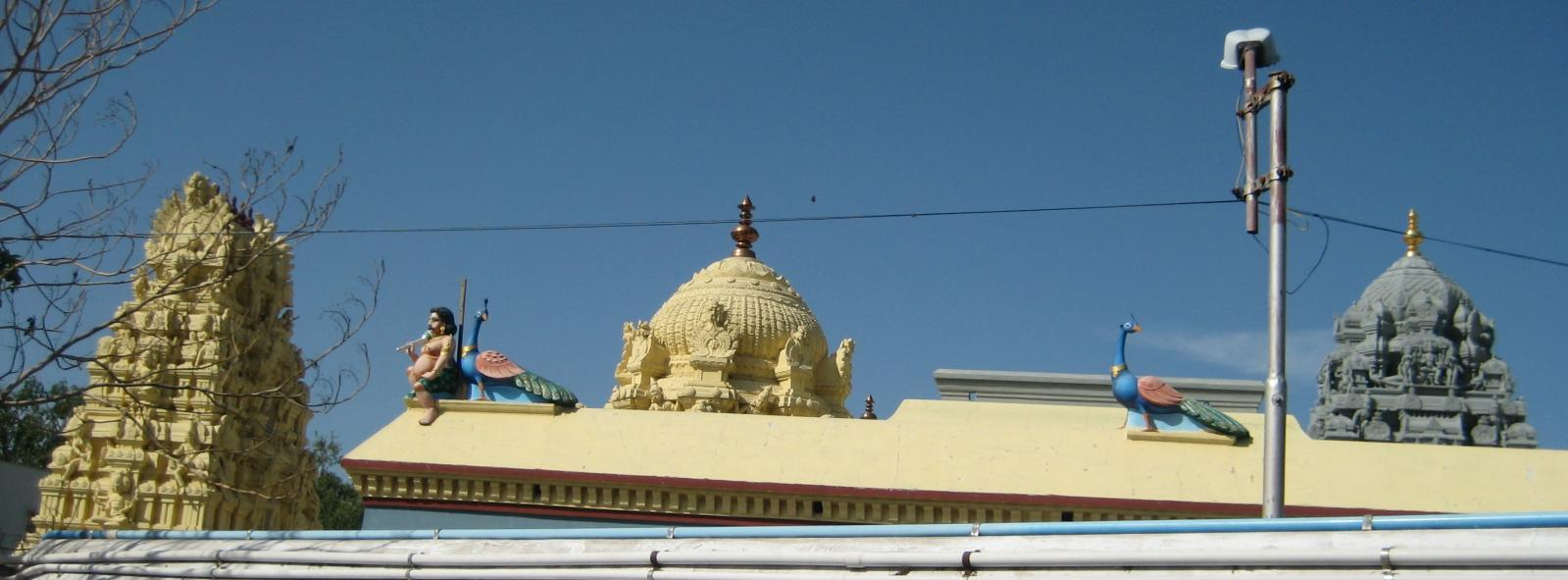
Side view of the Kumarakottam Temple

The temple was rebuilt during 1915. It has the temple pinnacle (shikara) above the main sanctum (garbha griha), which is built in granite and is in the shape of a dome called the chakra vimānam (circular dome) which is a Chola period structure. The corbels and the pilasters with epigraphs decorate the walls of the temple. The temple has two prakārams (circumambulatory passages) and many parivāra devatās (family deities) are installed in subshrines around it.

The central image of Murugan is uniquely depicted as Brahma-Shāstā, holding a kamandalu (water pot) and prayer beads of Rudrāksha.

The linga worshipped by Murugan is deified in a separate shrine within the temple complex and is called Devasenāpathīsar or Senāpathi Ishvara.

== Kandha Purānam ==
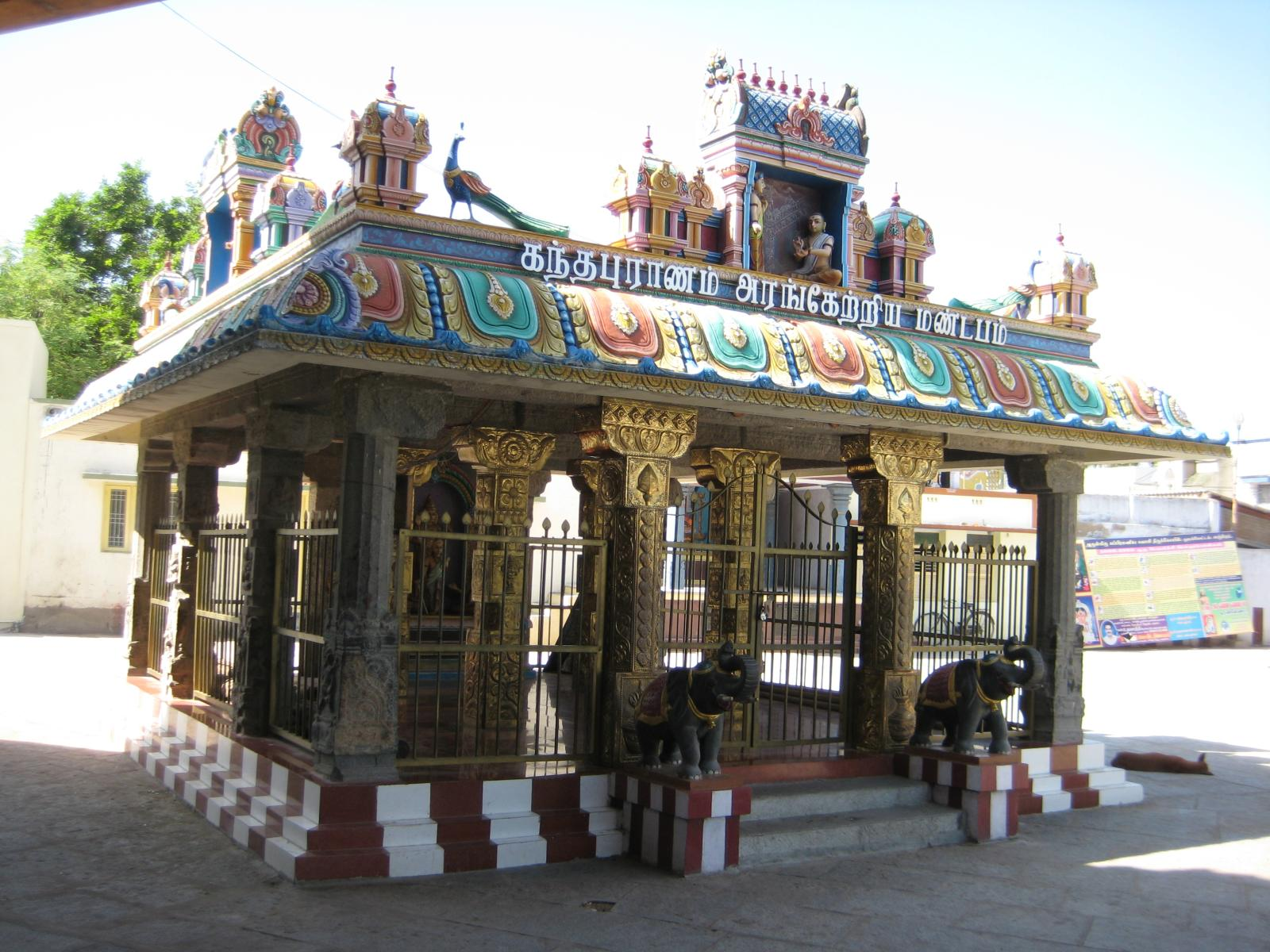
Mantapam (Hall) in the Kumarakottam Temple complex where the epic Kandha Purānam was released

Kacchiyappar (Kacchiyappa Shiva āchāriyār), a Tamil scholar, was a priest in the Kumara kottam temple. He composed the text Kandha Purānam. The hall, the Kandhapurāna Arangetra Mantapam (An outdoor pavilion) where Kacchiyappar composed the text still exists in the temple complex. Peacocks flock the premises even now. Kacchiyappar wrote the epic in six cantos, comprising 10,346 stanzas. It is believed that the first line of the first stanza was written by Kacchiyappar's patron deity, Murugan himself. The god is also believed to have corrected the 100 stanzas written by the priest during the day. The poet took his composition to the god and rehearsed it. Even now the priests in the temple are the descendants of Kacchiyappar.

== Festivals ==
A popular festival held here is Kandha Shashti (in November), 6th day of waxing (brightening) half of the lunar month Kārtthigai, named after Murugan, also known as Skandha (Kandhan in Tamil). During the month of Kārtthigai (November–December) between the darker (waning) half and the brighter (waxing) half of Moon, celebrations are held in the temple when a very large number of lamps are lit in the temple. The worship in the temple is scheduled six times daily. In every lunar month on the days of the rising star of Kirutthigai (as per Hindu Calendar) festival is held in the temple when very large number of devotees offer prayers to the deity. Each temple in Kānchipuram celebrates the Brahmā festival, as Brahmotsavam, when processions of gods are held in the morning and evening.

== Bibliography ==
- Knapp, Stephen Knapp (1 January 2009). Spiritual India Handbook. Jaico Publishing House. ISBN 978-81-8495-024-3.
- Michell, George (1 March 1993). Temple Towns Of Tamil Nadu. Marg Publications. ISBN 978-81-85026-21-3.
- Pillai, M. S. Purnalingam (1904). A Primer of Tamil Literature. Ananda Press.
- Rao, A. V. Shankaranarayana Rao (2001). Temples of Tamilnadu. Vasan Publications. ISBN 9788184681123.
- Rao, P. V. L. Narasimha (2008). Kanchipuram: Land of Legends, Saints and Temples. Readworthy. ISBN 978-81-89973-54-4.
- Spuler, Bertold (1975). Handbook of Oriental Studies. BRILL. ISBN 978-90-04-04190-5.

== Nearest Hindu Temple ==
- Arulmigu Thirumagaraleeswar Temple, Magaral
