= Thiruvalaputhur T A Kaliyamurthy =

Indian musician (1948–2020)

- Born: Arunachalam Pillai Kaliyamurthy; 22 October 1948
- Origin: Thiruvalaputhur, Mayiladuthurai, Tamil Nadu
- Died: 19 February 2020 (aged 71)
- Genre: Carnatic music
- Occupation: Thavil Artist
- Instrument: Thavil
- Years active: 1963 – 2020
- Website: www.tak.co.in

Kalaimamani Thiruvalaputhur T A Kaliyamurthy (22 October 1948 – 19 February 2020) was a noted Thavil musical artist providing 'special' Thavil accompaniment ('Special' in percussion circles denotes selection-grade status and seniority) to the Nagaswaram maestros.

The Cauvery delta region has produced several musicians who have been upholding the rich tradition of Carnatic music. Several hamlets in and around Kumbakonam and Mayiladuthurai (erstwhile Mayavaram) have had a major share in the proliferation of Nagaswaram and Thavil vidwans since time immemorial. Thiruvalaputhur is one such hamlet from where Thavil vidwan T.A. Kaliyamurthy hailed.

== Early life ==
Kalaimamani Thiruvalaputhur T.A. Kaliyamurthy was born on 22 October 1948 in Thiruvalaputhur to Arunachalam Pillai and Smt. Rajamani Ammal.

His maternal uncle Thiru. S. Kadirvel Pillai was his first Teacher from the age of 5 to age of 8. At the age of 8 he was taught Thavil under his great-grandfather Pasupathia Pillai Thavil Vidwan of Thiruvalaputhur and got special training in Thavil using Rhymes and Rhythms and other items necessary for the art.

== Performing career ==
After 7 years of training he started to be an exponent of the Thavil art individually. He also participated as "Special Thavil Artist" in various concerns with all leading Nadaswara vidwans like Thiruvengadu T.P. Subramani Pillai, Thiruvizhimizhalai Govindaraja Pillai brothers, Sembanarkoil S.R.Dakshinamoorthy Pillai brothers, Thirumeignanam Nataraja Sundaram Pillai, Namagiripettai Krishnan, Madurai Sethuraman Ponnusami brothers, Sheik Chinna Moulana, Clarinet Everest A. K. C. Natarajan.

He was awarded the A-High grade with 43 years Service. He performed regularly on the All India Radio and Doordarshan.

He was also Judge of Local Audition Committee All India Radio, Trichirapalli up to 15 August 1991.

== Honours ==
- Layagana Thavil Arasu
  (Vengateswara Bakthajanasabha of Royapettah Chennai in the year 1968)
- Sunatha Thavil Isai Chakravarthi
- Din Dima Kalanipuna Makuda Rathna
  (Salem Sangeetha vidhwa sabhai)
- Bala Bhishvesvara
  (Bangalore Sangeetha Vidwa sabhai)
- Kalaimamani
  (Tamil Nadu State Government in the year 1981)
- Isalmamurasu
  (Thiruvaiyar Tamil Isai Vizha)
- Thavil Selvam
  (Muthamiz peravai Chennai in the year 1983)
- Akila Ulaga Thavil Vaadiya Janaranjaga Laya Chakravarthi
  (Tiruchi RR Sabha in the year 1999)
- Thavil Meeadhai
  (Yenkan Sangeetha Isai Vizha)
- Sangeetha Kalasagara
  (Visakha Music Academy, Visakapattinam in the year 2005)
- Kanchi Kamakoti Peetam Asthana Tavil Vidwan
- Kendra Sangeet Natak Academy award (2014)
