= Namagiripettai block =

Namagiripettai block is a revenue block in the Namakkal district of Tamil Nadu, India. It has a total of 18 panchayat villages.

Its headquarter are in Namagiripettai town.
