= Namagiripettai =

- Town
- Location in Tamil Nadu, India
- Coordinates: 11.47°N 78.27°E
- Country: India
- State: Tamil Nadu
- District: Namakkal
- Elevation: 273 m (896 ft)

Population (2011)
  - Total: 21,250
- Time zone: UTC+5:30 (IST)
- PIN: 637406
- Vehicle registration: TN-28

Namagiripettai (Tamil: நாமகிரிப்பேட்டை) is a panchayat town in Namakkal district in the Indian state of Tamil Nadu.

It is the headquarter of the Namagiripettai block.

== Etymology ==
Namagiripettai is an urban panchayat with a historical marker for the nearby villages and a town for the Kollimalai residents. Namagiripettai derives its name from Namagiri + Pettai, which means a form of the Hindu goddess Lakshmi, also known as Namagiri Amman + Pettai, meaning market place (Tamil:பேட்டை(பெ): புறநகர்; நகரத்தருகிற் சந்தைகூடும் ஊர்ச்சார்பு; சந்தையூர்; பிரயாண வண்டி முதலியன தங்குமிடம்) meaning Market Place also called Santhai.

== History ==
The Kolli Hills are featured in several works of classical Tamil literature such as Silappathigaram, Manimekalai, Purananuru, and Ainkurnuru. The region was ruled by Valvil Ori around 200 AD, who is praised as one of the seven great philanthropists of ancient Tamil Nadu. Several poets have sung his valor and marksmanship, and his exploits are a popular part of folklore. Ori is said to have killed a lion, bear, deer, and a boar with a single arrow.

== Geography ==
On the SH79 at the foot of the Kolli Hills, on the way to Kalapana Nakkiyan Patti, Namagiripettai is located at a distance of 20 km and Rasipuram at a distance of 30 km. Its average elevation is 273 meters (895 feet).

=== Flora and Fauna ===
The jackfruit grown on these mountains is known for its taste and fragrance and is often soaked in wild honey that is also harvested from these mountains. The mountains are covered by green vegetation in the spring and monsoon and are streaked with streams. Three reserved forests are controlled by the Government of Tamil Nadu, namely Ariyur Solai, Kundur Nadu, Pulianjolai. It is not correct to regard the name kolli hills as being due to the incidence of deadly diseases such as malaria!

== Demographics ==
=== Population ===
As of 2001 India census, Namagiripettai had a population of 21,447. Males constitute 51% of the population and females 49%. Namagiripettai has an average literacy rate of 59%, lower than the national average of 59.5%: male literacy is 67%, and female literacy is 51%. In Namagiripettai, 10% of the population is under 6 years of age.

== Economy ==
Neighboring farmers and villagers, Namagiripettai serves as a marketplace for the exchange of agricultural products such as turmeric, cassava, sugarcane, paddy, and millets, and, in Chennai, the selling of fruits, vegetables, and other produce is practiced as a weekly tradition on Fridays. The town is home to several sago factories that produce sago foods and starch.

== Culture/Cityscape ==
Namagiripettai has a number of Hindu temples. Sri Mariamman Temple, dedicated to the goddess Mariamman, has an annual festival Chithirai Ther Thiruvizha (தேர்) during the Tamizh month of Chithirai(April–May) as called mariamman festival.

== Education ==
Government Higher Secondary School, Namagiripettai, Greenworld Excel School(CBSE), Moolapallipatti, Sri Vani Matriculation Higher Secondary School, Thoppapatti

== Notable people ==
- Namagiripettai Krishnan who played Nadhaswaram belonged to this town and he was awarded Padmashri by the Indian government for his contributions to Carnatic music.
