= Ekambareswarar Temple (Kanchipuram) =

Hindu temple in Tamil Nadu, India

Ekambareswarar Temple Arulmigu Kanchi Ekambaranathar Thirukovil
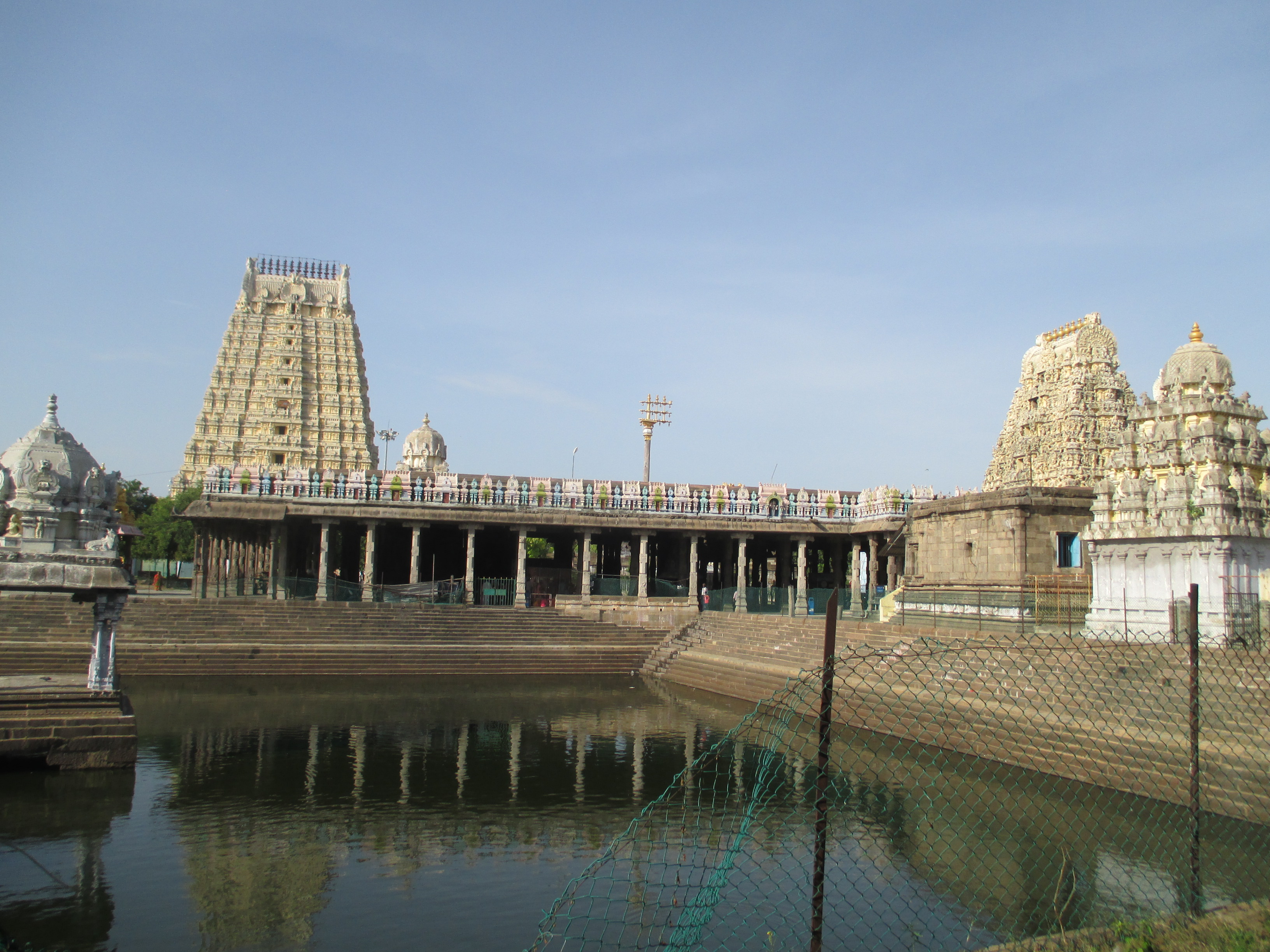

- Location in Tamil Nadu Ekambareswarar Temple (Kanchipuram) (Tamil Nadu)

Religion
- Affiliation: Hinduism
- Deity: Ekambaranathar (Shiva); Elavarkuzhali (Parvati)

Location
- Location: Kanchipuram
- State: Tamil Nadu
- Country: India
- Coordinates: 12°50′51″N 79°42′00″E

Architecture
- Type: Tamil architecture
- Creator: Pallava, Chola kings

Ekambareswarar Temple (Kanchi Ekambaranathar Thirukkovil) is a Hindu temple dedicated to the god Shiva, located in the town of Kanchipuram in Tamil Nadu, India. It is significant to the Hindu sect of Saivism as one of the temples associated with the five elements, the Pancha Bhoota Stalas, and specifically the element of earth, or Prithvi. Shiva is worshiped as Ekambareswarar or Ekambaranathar or Rajalingeswaram, and is represented by the lingam as Prithvi lingam. His consort Parvati is depicted as Elavarkuzhali.

The presiding deity is revered in the 7th century Tamil Saiva canonical work, the Tevaram, written by Tamil saint poets known as the nayanars and classified as Paadal Petra Sthalam.

The temple complex covers 10 hectares (25 acres), and is one of the largest in India. It houses four gateway towers known as gopurams. The tallest is the southern tower, with 11 stories and a height of 58.5216 m (192 ft), making it one of the tallest temple towers in India. The temple has numerous shrines, with those of Ekambareswarar and the Vishnu shrine - Nilathingal Thundam Perumal (a Divyadesam) being the most prominent. The temple complex houses many halls; the most notable is the thousand-pillared hall built during the Vijayanagar period.

The temple has six daily rituals at various times from 3:30~4:00 a.m. to 10 p.m., and twelve yearly festivals on its calendar. Panguni Uthiram festival celebrated for thirteen days during the Tamil month of Panguni (March - April) is the most prominent festival of the temple and the town.

The present masonry structure was built during the Chola dynasty in the 9th century, while later expansions are attributed to Vijayanagar rulers. The temple is maintained and administered by the Hindu Religious and Charitable Endowments Department of the Government of Tamil Nadu. The temple is the largest and one of the most prominent tourist attractions in the city.

== Legend ==
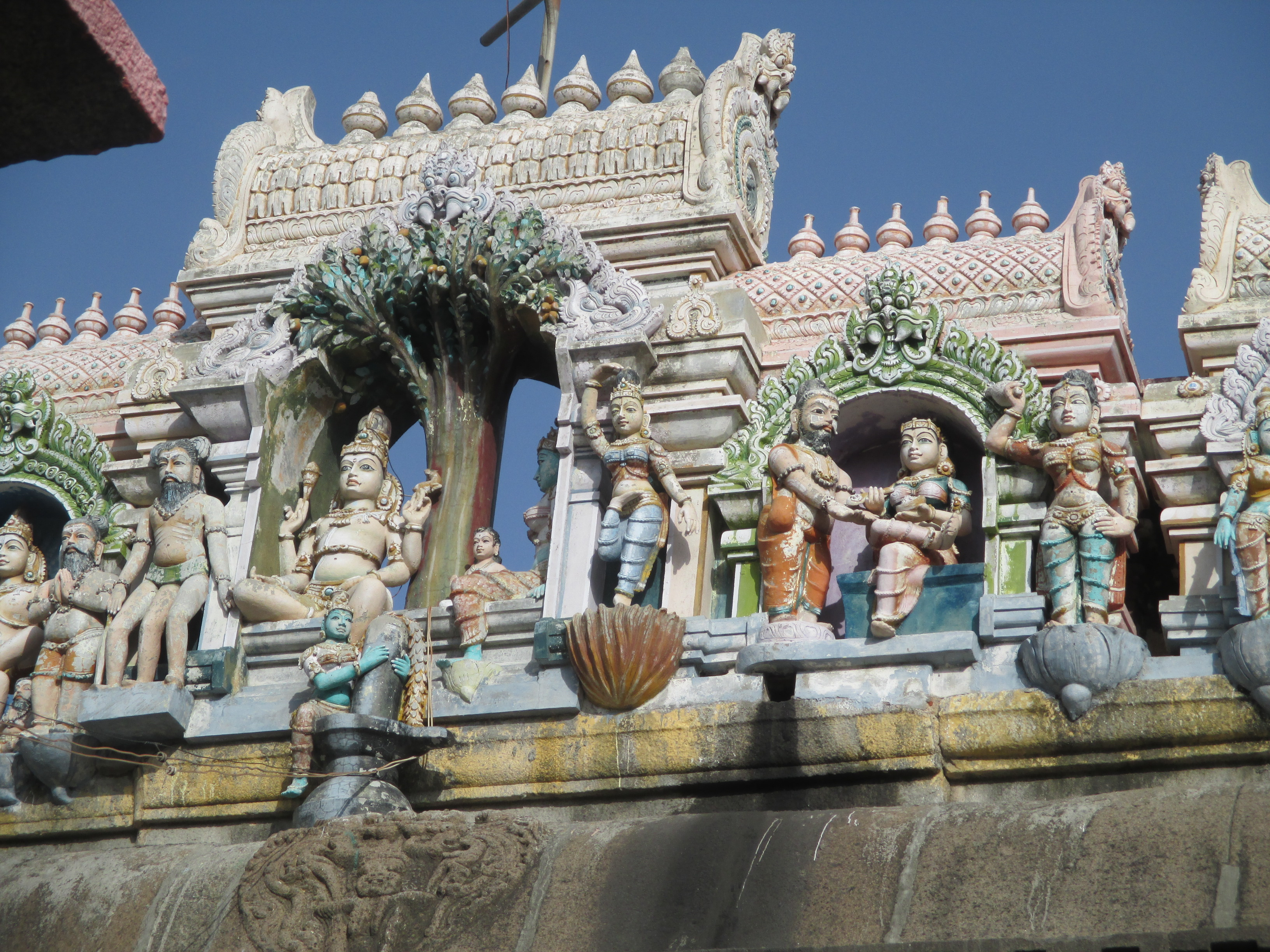
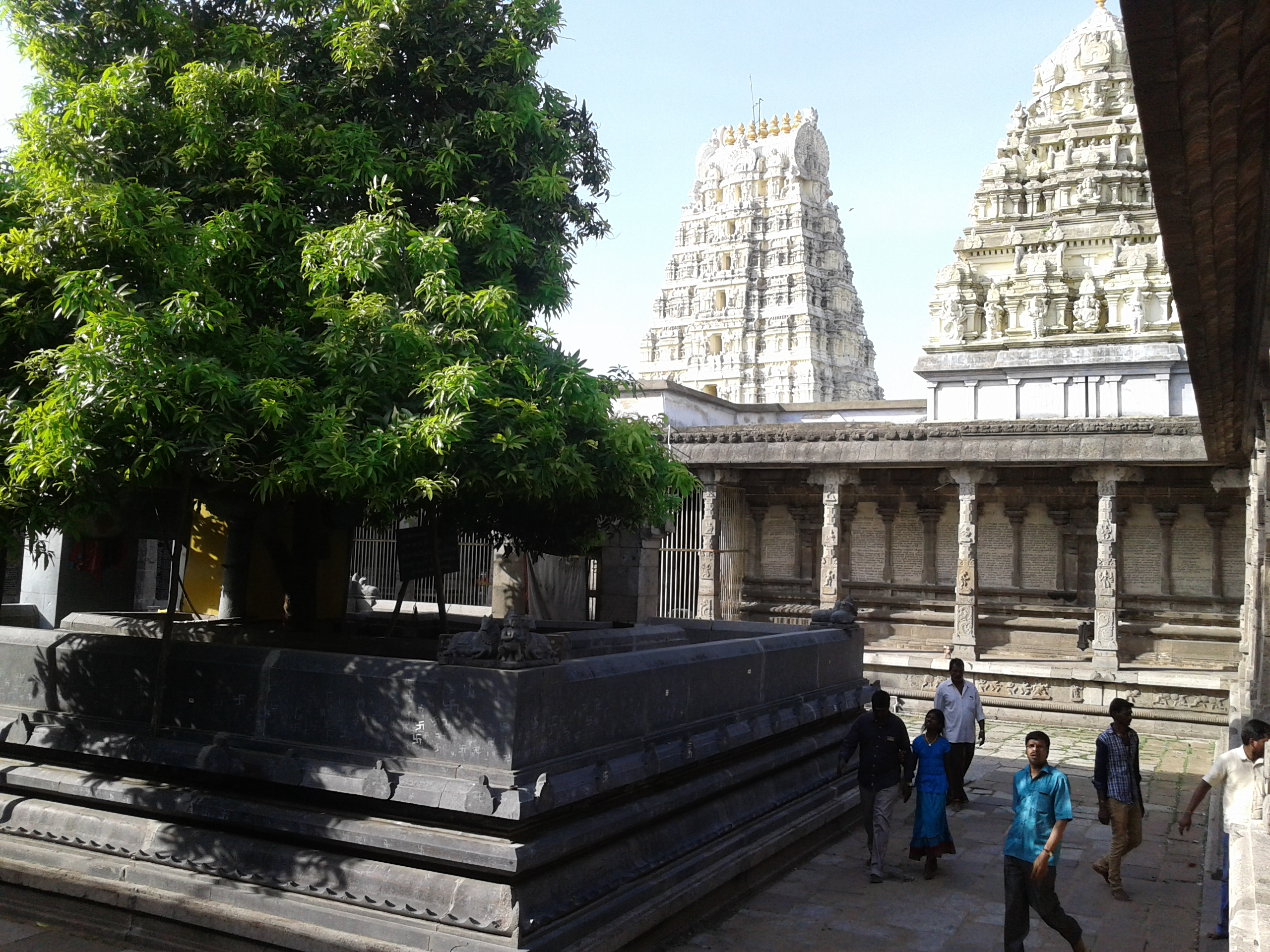
Stucco depiction of the mango-tree legend (left) and the mango tree behind the sanctum (right)

Legend has it that once Parvati, the consort of Shiva, wanted to expiate herself from sin by doing penance under a mango tree near Vegavati river. In order to test her devotion Shiva sent fire on her. Parvati prayed to the god Vishnu. Vishnu brought the Moon whose rays cooled down the tree and Parvati. Shiva again sent the river Ganga (Ganges) to disrupt Parvati's penance. Parvati convinced Ganga that since they were sisters, she should not harm Parvati. Parvati worshipped a Shiva Linga out of sand to please Shiva. Ultimately, Shiva appeared before her as Ekambareswarar or "Lord of Mango Tree".

According to another legend, Parvati worshipped Shiva in the form of a Prithvi Lingam (or a Lingam out of sand), under a mango tree. Legend has it that the Vegavati river overflowed, threatening to engulf the Shiva Lingam; Parvati as Kamakshi embraced the Lingam. Shiva touched by the gesture materialized in person and married her. In this context he is referred to as Tazhuva kuzhainthaar ("He who melted in Her embrace") in Tamil.

Tirukuripputhonda Nayanar, a nayanar saint, was a washerman near the temple and he washed the clothes of all the Saivities. He was divinely tricked by Shiva appearing as an aged brahmin and asked him to wash before dawn. At the same time, Shiva made a cloudly evening. On observing the approach of the evening, the washerman banged his head in a stone in disappointment. God appeared in his true form and graced his devotee.

== History ==
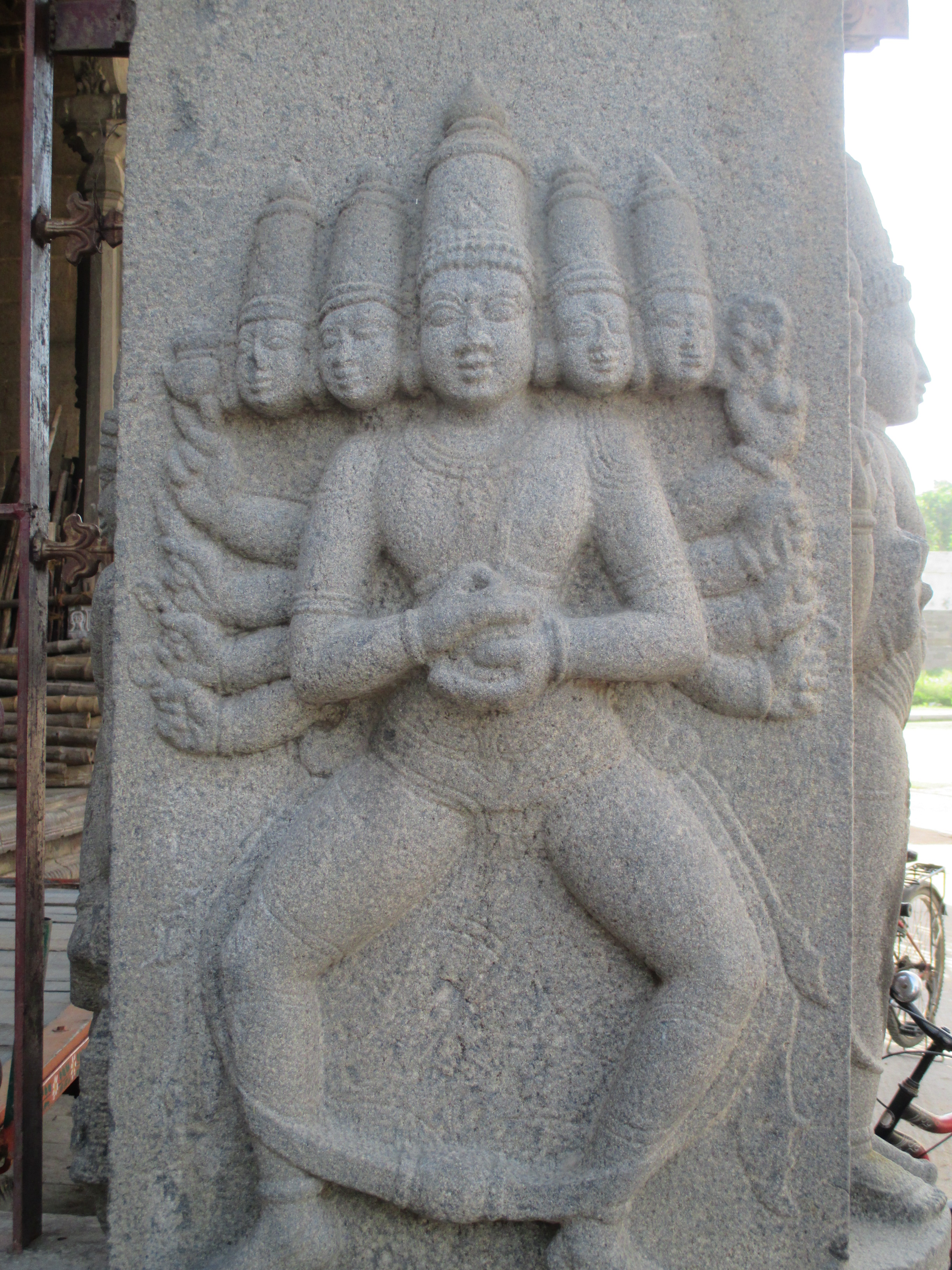
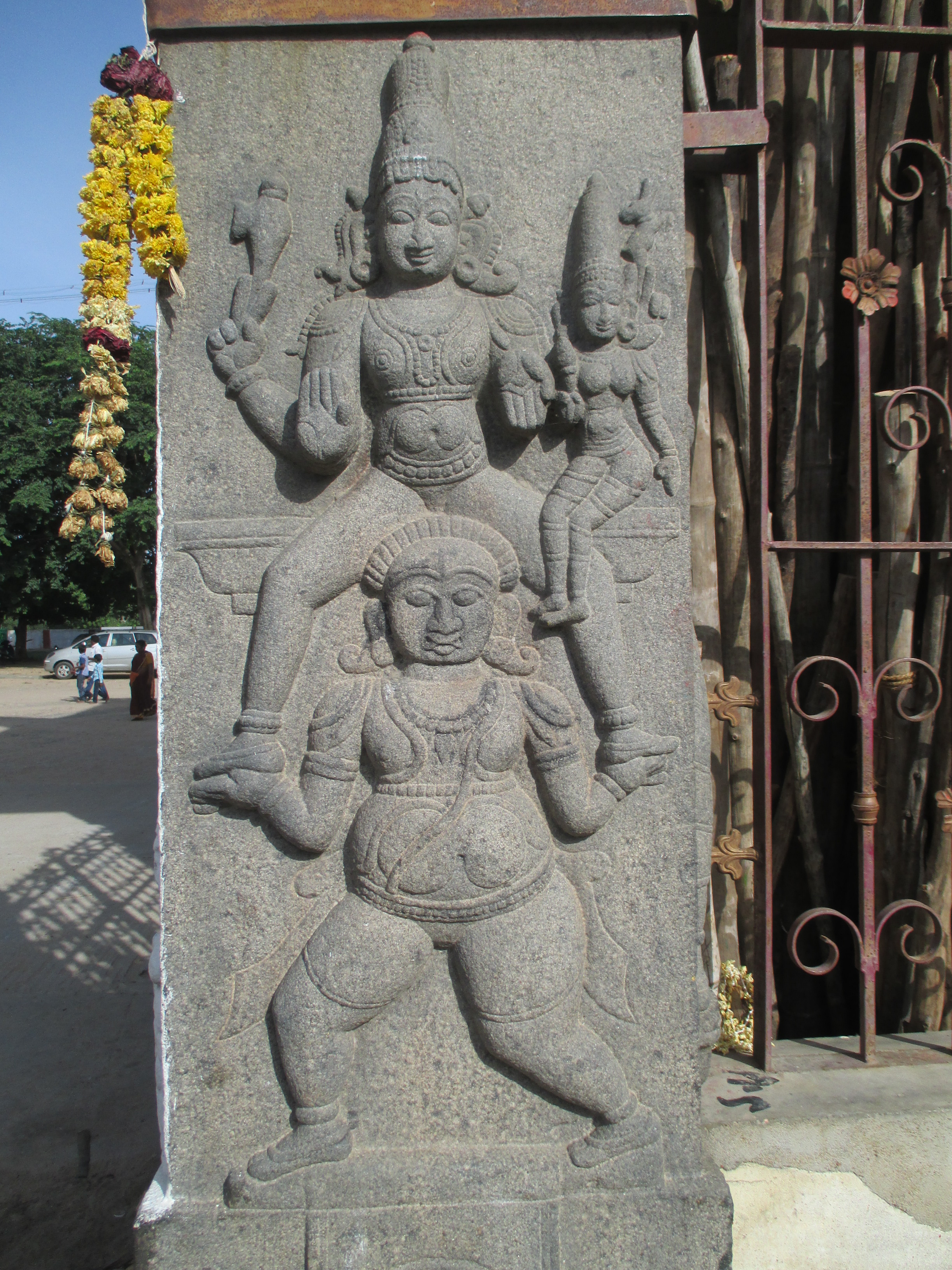
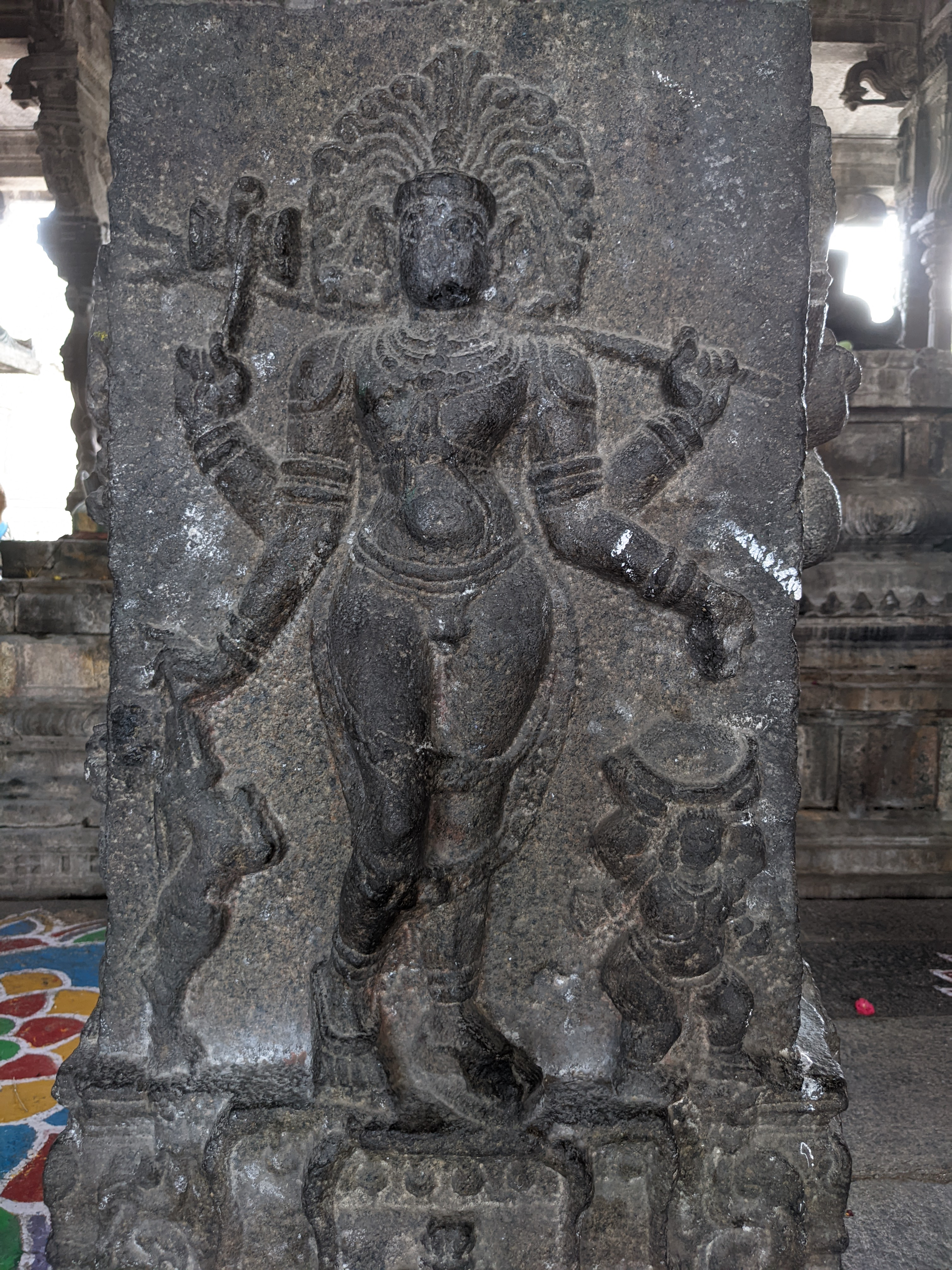
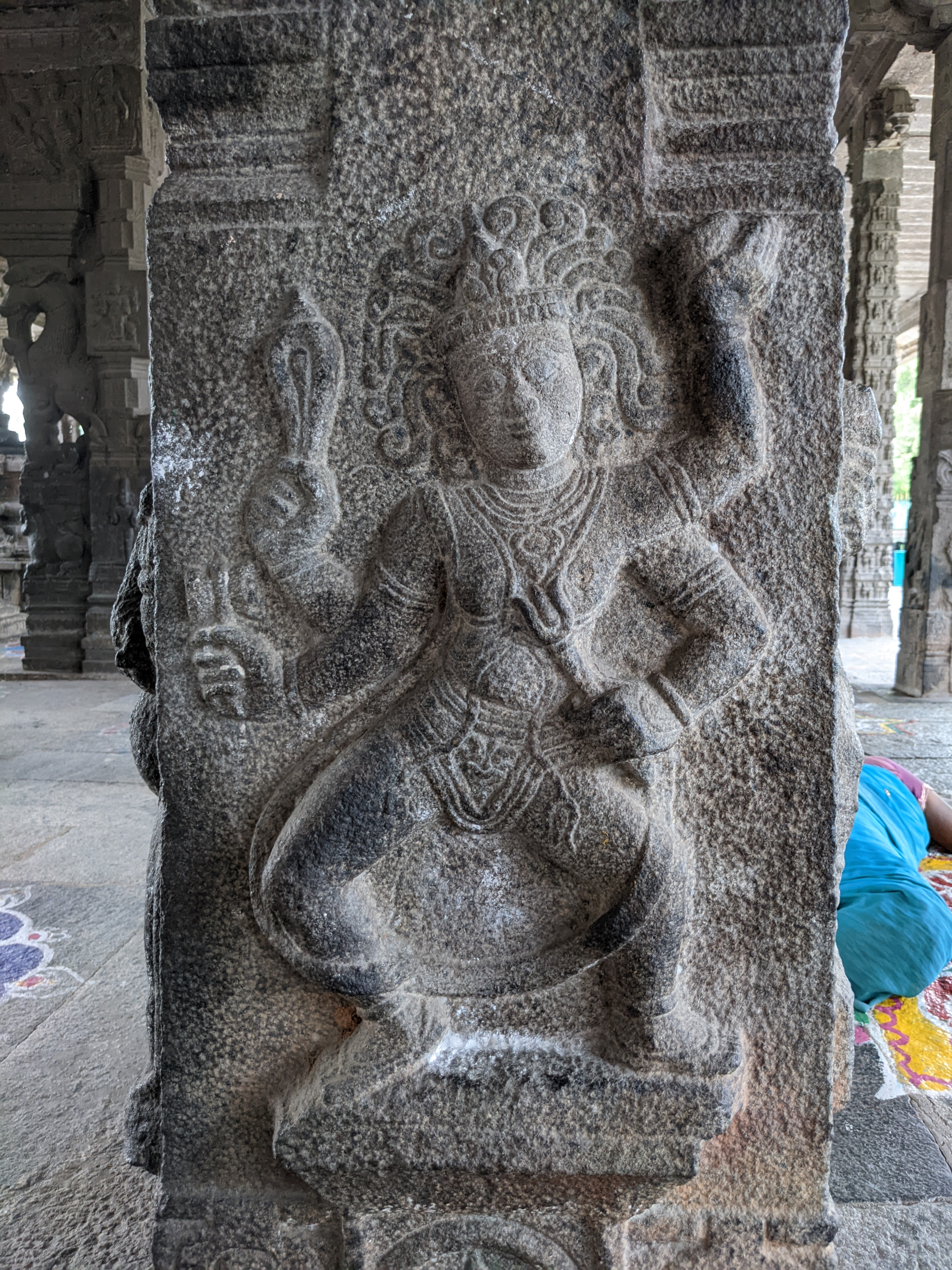
Sculptures on the temple walls

The gopuram of Ekambareswarar Temple (1961).

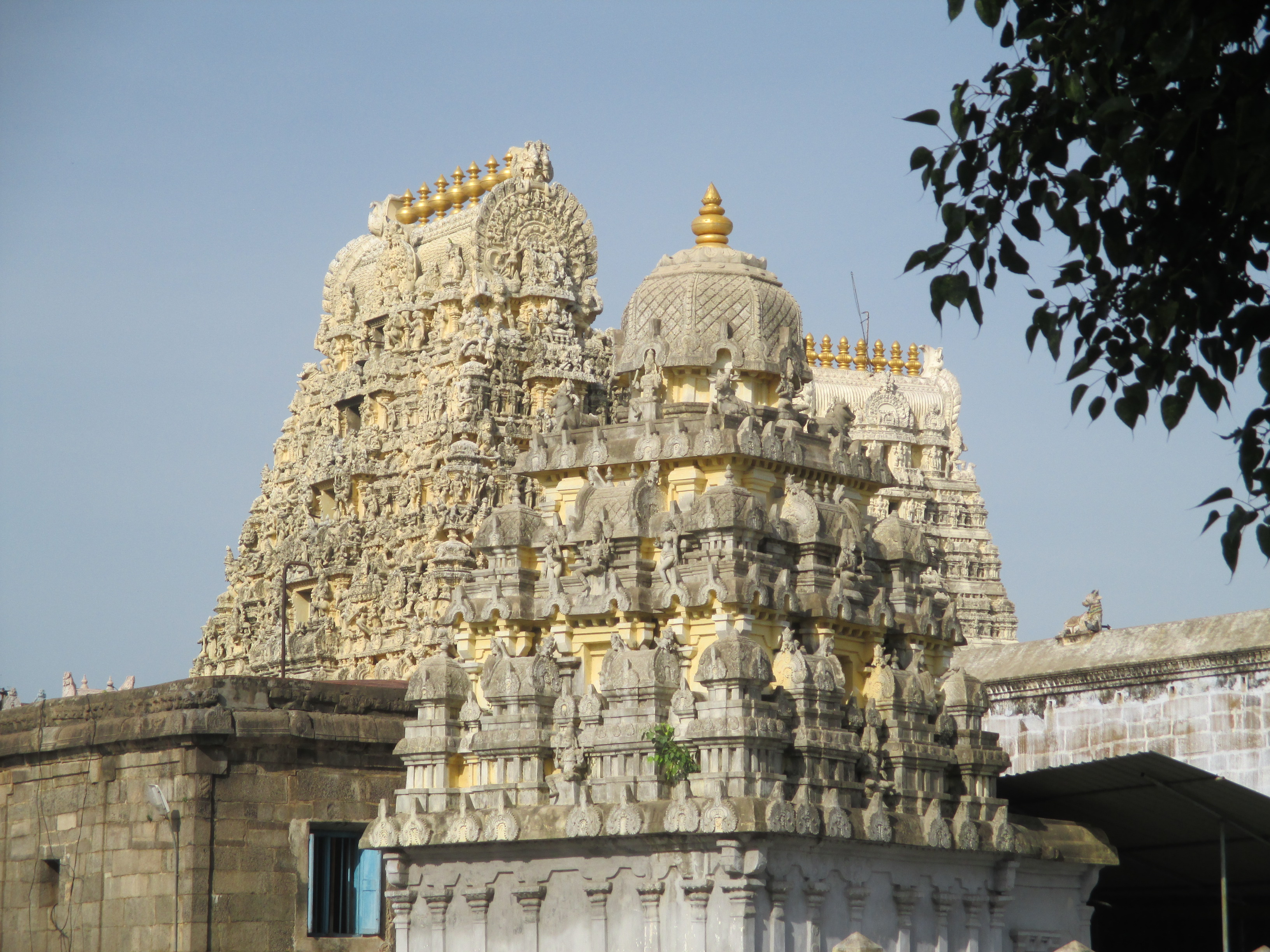
Shrines inside the temple

This vast temple is one of the most ancient in India having been in existence since at least 600 CE. Second-century-CE Tamil poetry speaks of Kama kottam, and the Kumara kottam (currently the Kamakashi Amman temple and the Subramanya temple). The temple finds mention in the classical Tamil Sangam literature dated 300 BCE like Manimegalai and Perumpāṇāṟṟuppaṭai. Initially temple was built by Pallavas. The Vedantist Kachiyapper served as a priest at the temple. The existing structure then, was pulled down and rebuilt by the later Chola Kings. Adi Sankara, the 10th-century saint got Kanchipuram remodelled along with expansion of this temple along with Kamakshi Amman temple and Varadaraja Perumal Temple with the help of local rulers.

There are inscriptions dated 1532 CE (record 544 of 1919) indicating the gift of number of villages made by Achutaraya. Vira Narasingaraya Saluva Nayaka who was directed by Achutaraya broke the royal order by giving more lands to Ekambaranathar temple than the Varadaraja Swamy temple against the instruction of an equal gift to either of the temples. Achutaraya on hearing this equally distributed the lands to both the temples. The eleven-storied southern gopuram, built by Krishnadevaraya (1509–29), is 57 m (187 ft) tall and is one of the tallest gopurams in the country.

The Vijayanagar kings, during the 15th century, also made lot of contributions to the temple and later developed by Vallal Pachiyappa Mudaliar used to go regularly from Chennai to Kanchipuram to worship in this temple, he spent significant money he amazed during British rule on the temple renovation, Pachiyappa Mudaliar seated at horse back can be seen in the temple pillar. At the later stage a similar temple with same name Ekambareswarar was constructed in Chennai by Pachiappa Mudaliar in order to avoid travelling time to Kanchipuram. The Archaeological Survey of India report of 1905–06 indicates widespread renovation activities carried out in the temple by Nattukottai Chettiars. In modern times, the temple is maintained and administered by the Hindu Religious and Charitable Endowments Department of the Government of Tamil Nadu. The temple's kumbhabhishekam was performed on December 8, 2025, in the presence of the Shankaracharyas from the Kanchi Kamakoti Peetham.

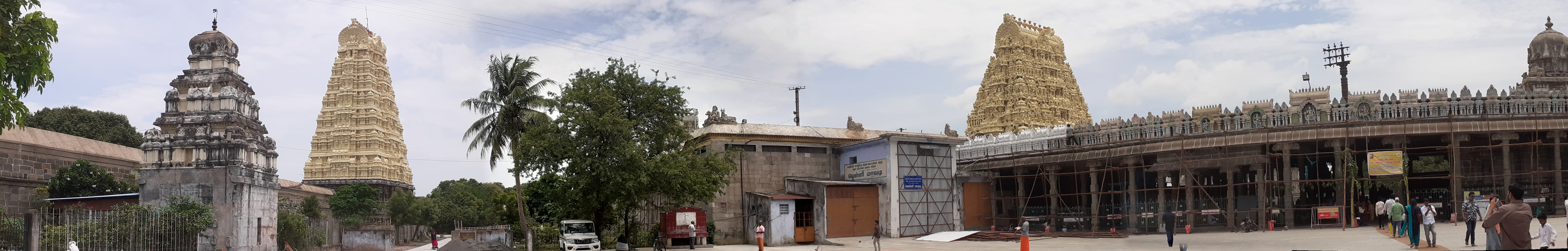
Panoramic view of the temple

== Architecture ==
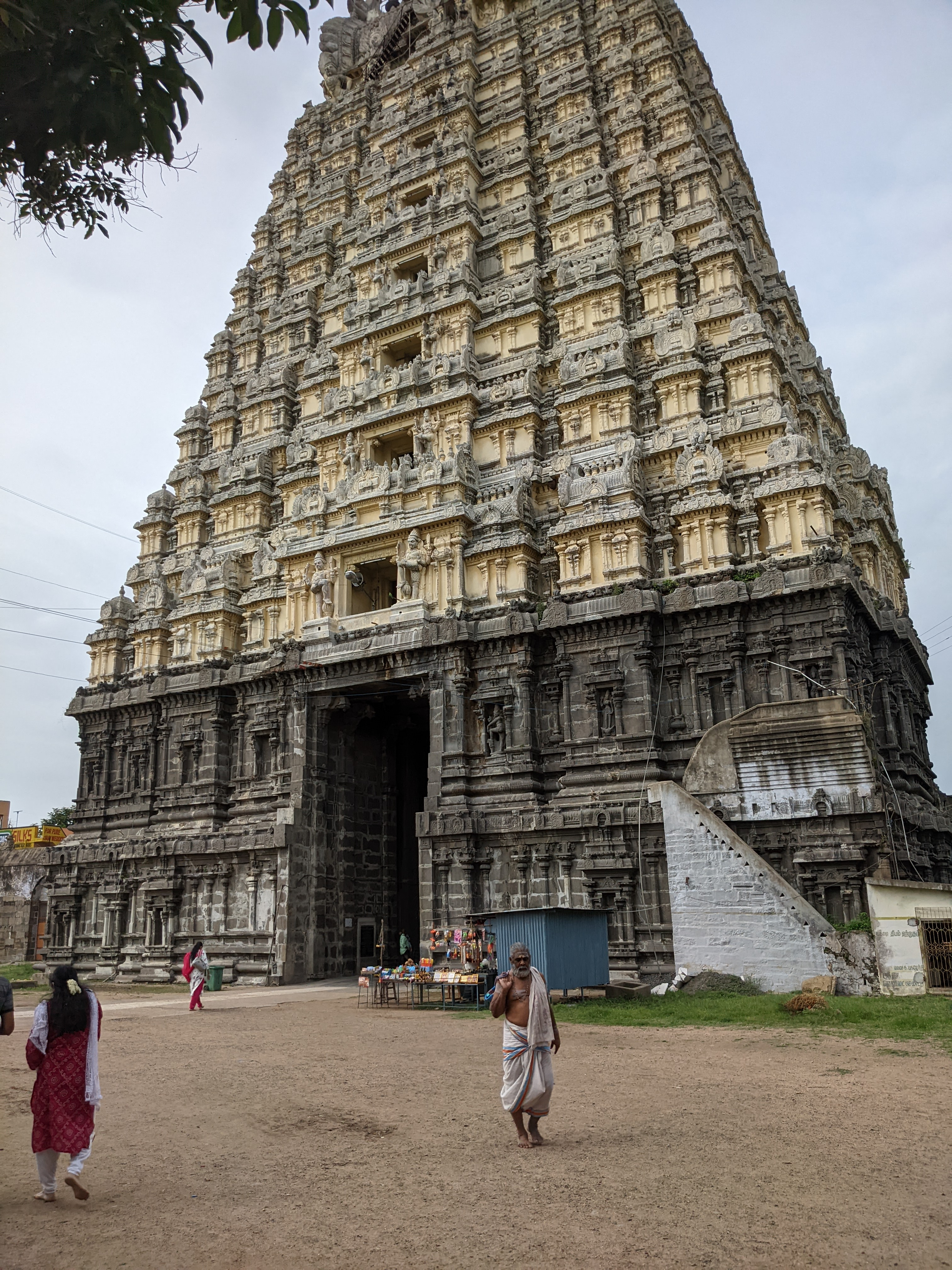
The gopuram of Ekambareswarar Temple

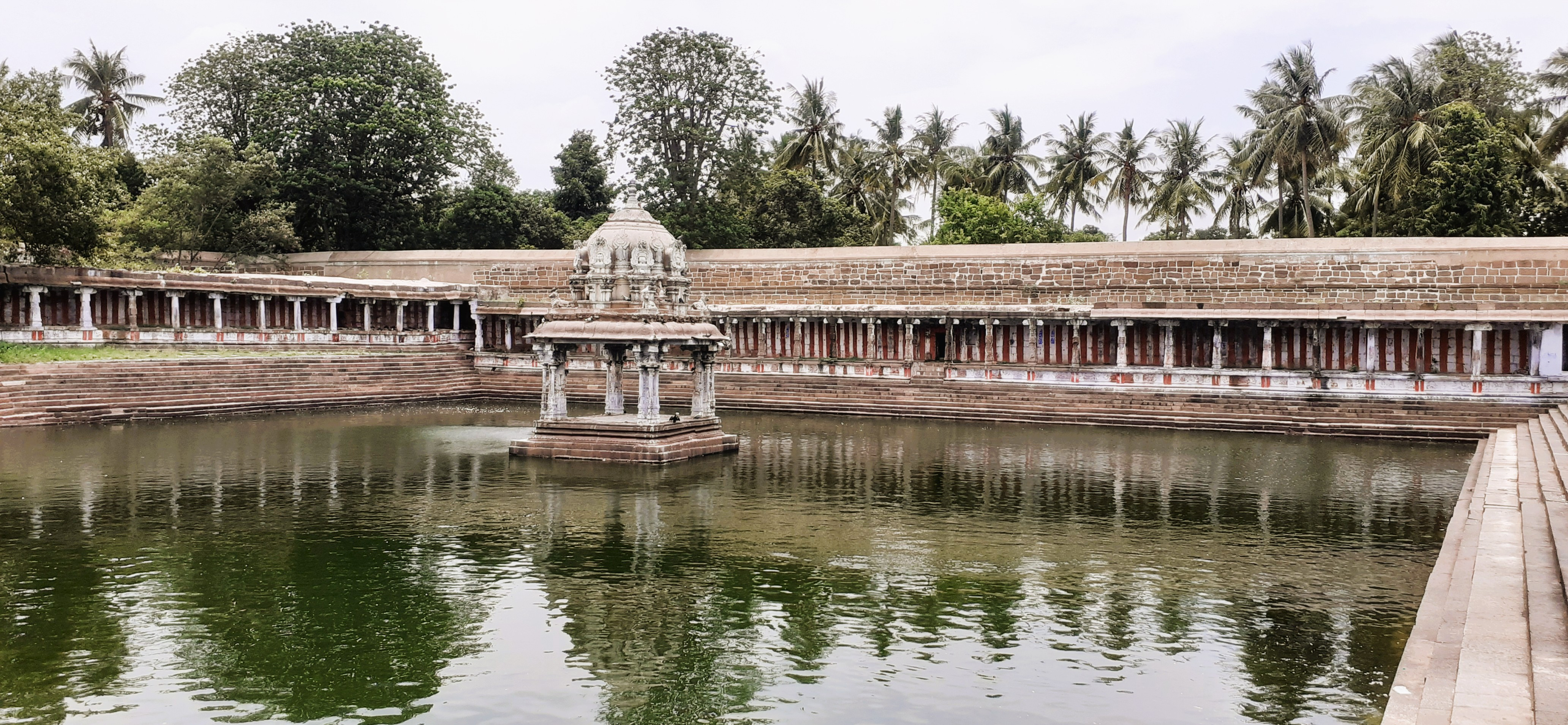
Temple tank with a central mandapa

The temple covers an area of over 9.3 hectares (23 acres). Reaching a height of 59 m (194 ft), the temple's Raja gopuram (the entrance tower to the temple) is one of the tallest in South India. The bottom half of the gateway tower has the shrines of Vinayaka and Murugan on either sides. From the entrance, there are two halls namely Vahana Mandapam (vehicle hall) and Sarabesa Mandapam (also called Navaratri hall). The Aayiram Kaal Mandapam, or the "hallway with a thousand pillars", which was built by the Vijayanagar Kings, is found on precinct after the gateway tower. There is said to have been an underground holy river. The fourth courtyard contains a small Ganesha temple and a pond. The third courtyard contains lot of smaller shrines. The flag staff of the temple is axial to the sanctum and diagonally located to the main entrance and the temple tank on either directions. There is a shrine called Thirukachi Mayanam and Kalayana Mandapa, named after Pachayappa Mudaliar, both of which are located close to the flag staff. Thirukachi Mayanam, Valeesam, Rishabesam and Satyanadeesam are located in four corners of the temple. The hall of the flagstaff has pillars sculpted with intricate figures indicating various legends and avatars of Shiva.

The sanctum sanctorum contains the lingam along with the image of Shiva and Parvati sitting together. The gold plated lingam depicts the story of Parvati hugging the lingam to save it from the flooding Vegavati river. There are granite image of the 63 Nayanmars around the first precinct. The temple's inner most precinct are decorated with an array of Shivalingam, one of which is a Sahasra Lingam with 1,008 Siva lingams sculpted on it. There is no separate shrine for Parvati within the complex as with all other Shiva temples in Kanchipuram. A local belief is that the deity at the Kamakshi Amman Temple is the consort for Ekambaranathar. Behind the image of Lingam in the sanctum, there is a depiction of Shiva and Parvathi in a plaque with Shiva depicted as Tazhuvakuzhainthaar Swami and Parvathi as Elavarkuzhali Amman.

There is a small shrine for Vishnu named Nilathingal Thundam Perumal temple inside the temple complex. Vishnu is prayed as Vamana and the shrine is hailed by the Alvar saints as one of the 108 Divya Desams. There is a separate shrine for Nataraja on the second precinct. The sthala-vriksham or temple tree is believed to be a 3,500-year-old mango tree whose branches are said to yield four different types of mangoes from its four branches.

== Religious significance of the temple ==
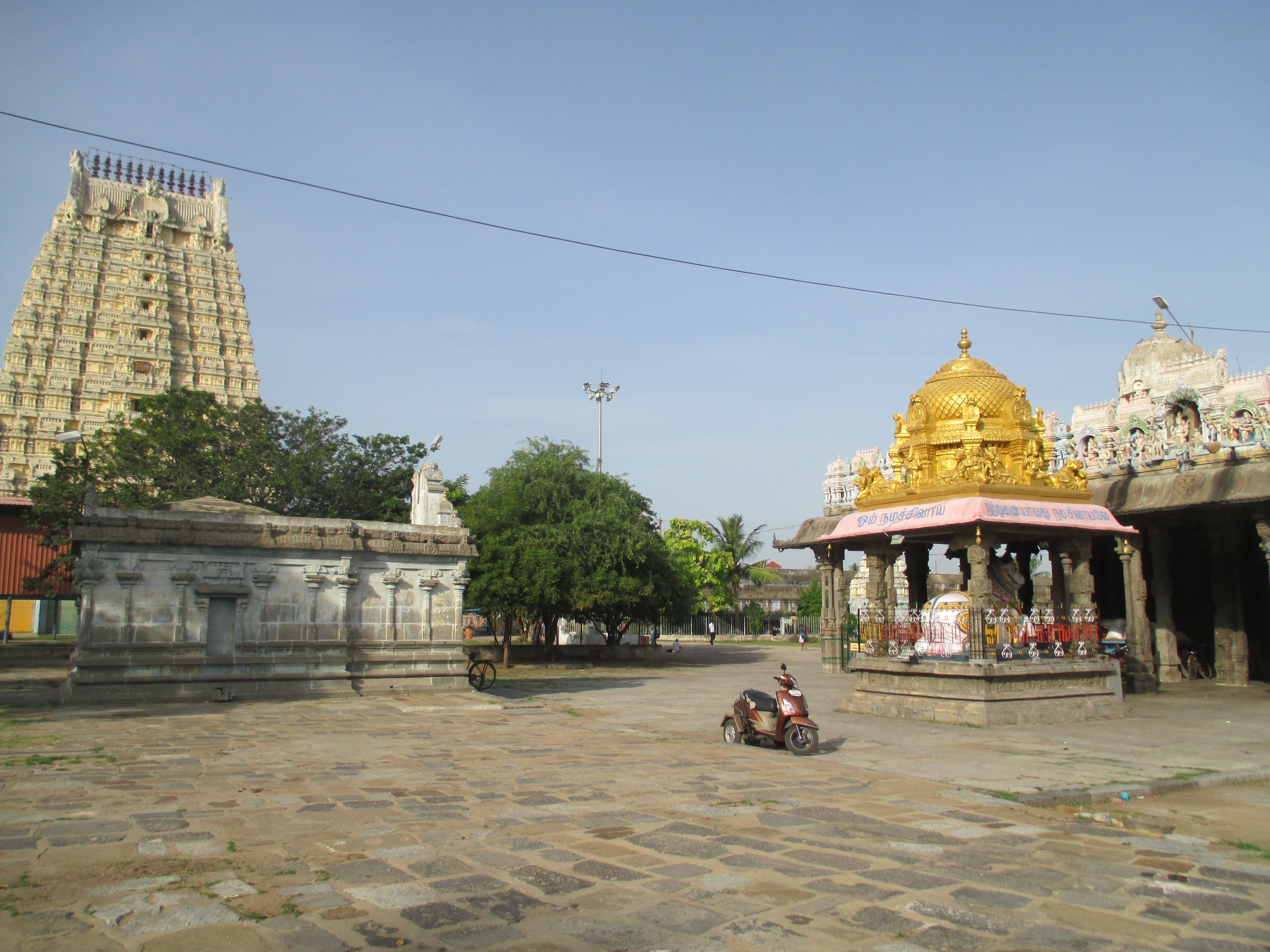
The entrance shrine of the temple

Pancha Bhoota Stalam refers to the five Shiva temples, each representing the manifestation of the five prime elements of nature - land, water, air, sky, fire. Pancha indicates five, Bhoota means elements and Stala means place. All these temples are located in South India with four of these temples at Tamil Nadu and one at Andhra Pradesh. The five elements are believed to be enshrined in the five lingams and each of the lingams representing Shiva in the temple have five different names based on the elements they represent. In the temple, Shiva is said to have manifested himself in the form of Prithvi Lingam. The other four manifestations are Appu Lingam (representing water) at Jambukeswarar Temple, Thiruvanaikaval, Akasha Lingam (representing sky) at Thillai Nataraja Temple, Chidambaram, Agni Lingam (representing fire) at Annamalaiyar Temple and Vayu Lingam (representing air) at Srikalahasti Temple. Kanchipuram is famous for hand-woven silk sarees - a design by name Ekambaranathar obtain its name from the designs of these shrines.

== Saints and literary mention ==
Tirugnana Sambandar, a 7th-century Tamil Saivite poet, venerated Ekambareswarar in ten verses in Tevaram, compiled as the First Tirumurai. Appar and Sundarar, contemporaries of Sambandar, also venerated Ekambareswarar in 10 verses in Tevaram, compiled as the Fifth Tirumurai and Ninth Tirumurai respectively. As the temple is revered in Tevaram, it is classified as Paadal Petra Sthalam, one of the 276 temples that find mention in the Saiva canon. Manickavasagar, a 9th-century Tamil saint and poet, revered Ekambareswarar in his writing. Thus the temple is revered by all four Saiva Kuravars. The presiding deity is also revered in the verses of famous folk singer Kanchi Kotayappa Nayak, one of the trinities of Carnatic music Muthuswami Dikshitar and Pattinathar.

== Worship and festivals ==
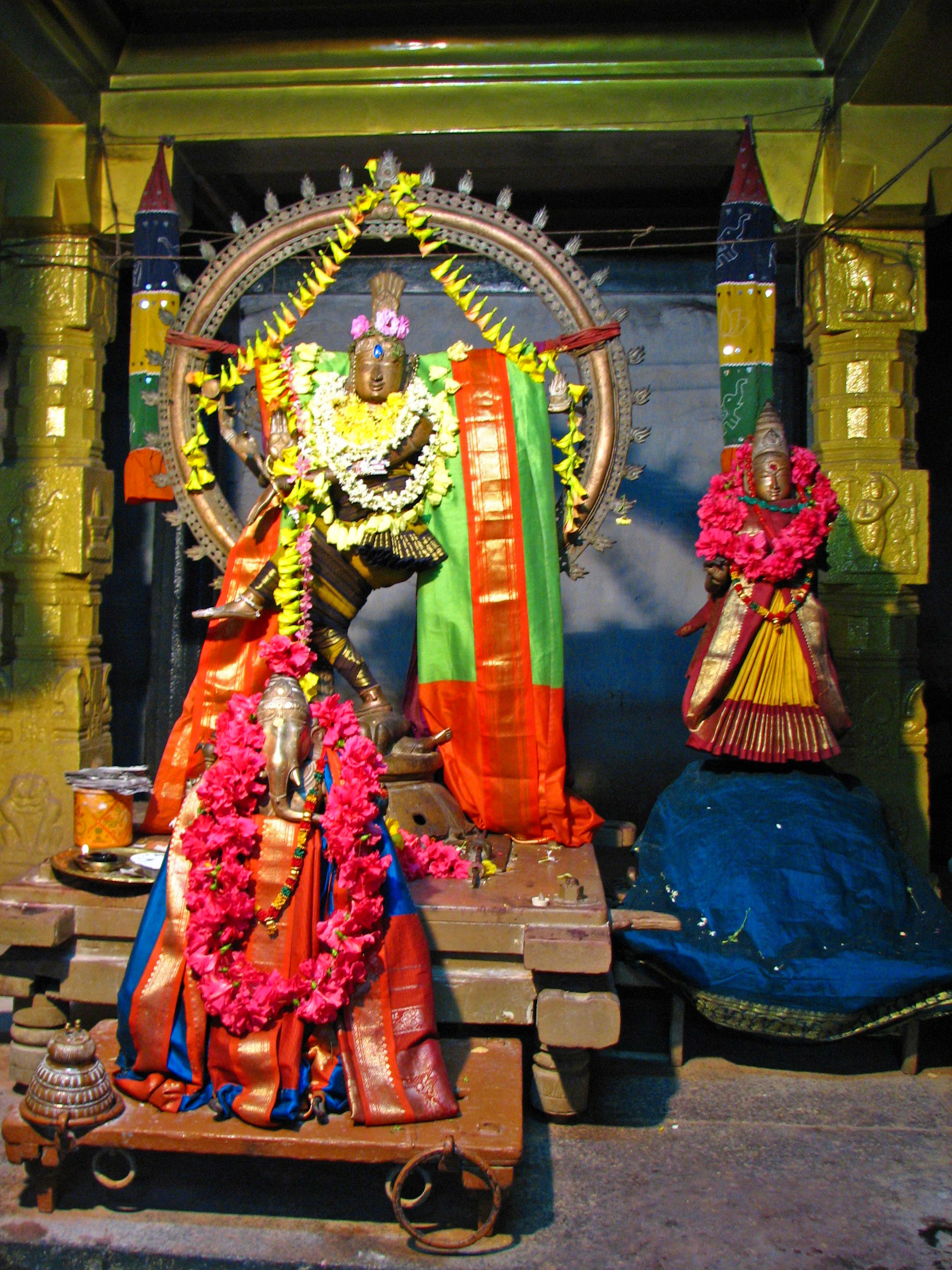
Image of Nataraja during a festival

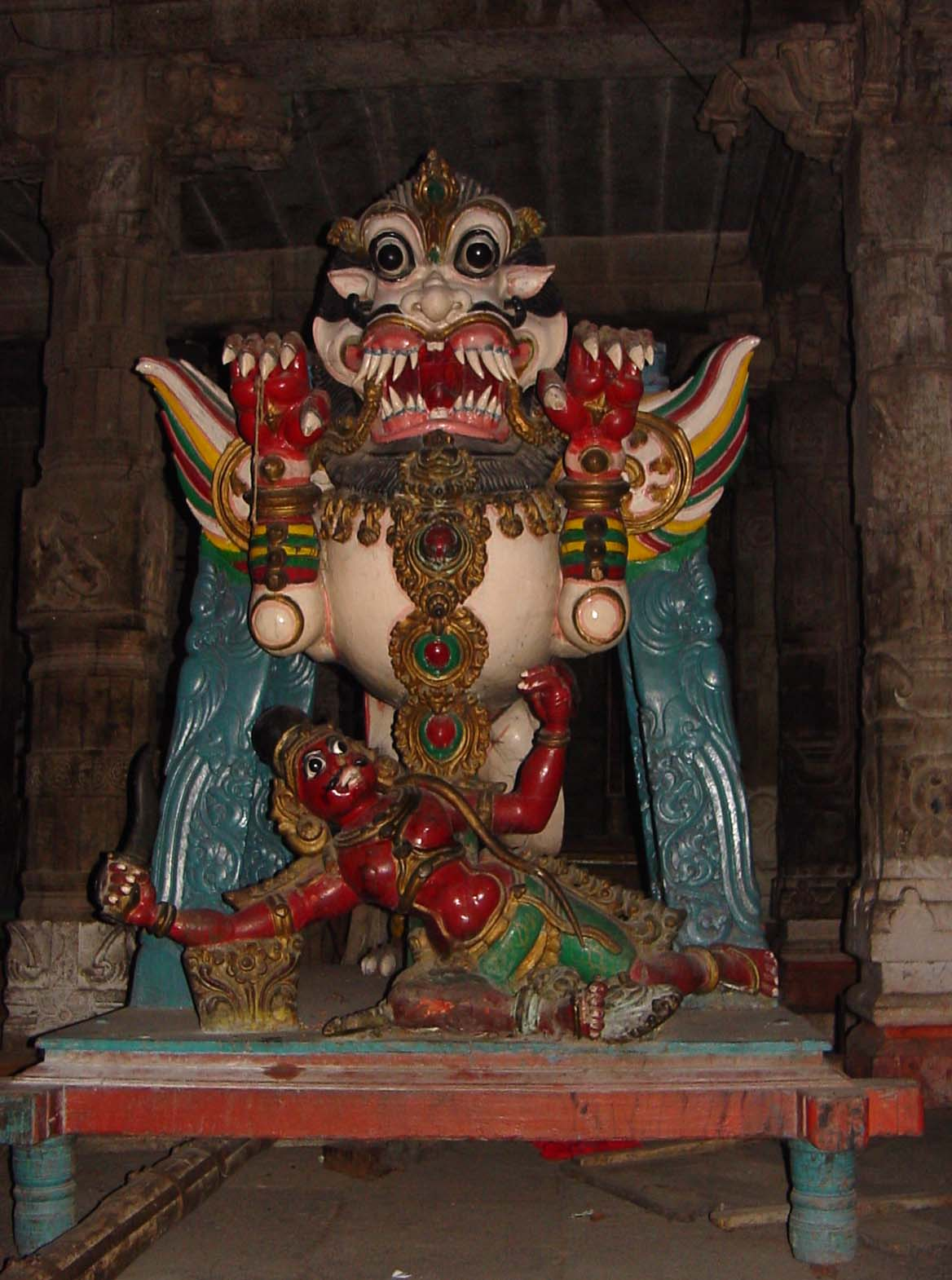
Temple mount used during a festival

The temple priest perform the pooja (rituals) during festivals and on a daily basis. Like other Shiva temples of Tamil Nadu, the priests belong to the Shaivaite community, a Brahmin sub-caste. The temple rituals are performed six times a day; Ushathkalam at 5:30 a.m., Kalasanthi at 8:00 a.m., Ucchikalam at 10:00 a.m., Sayarakshai at 6:00 p.m., Irandamkalam at 8:00 p.m. and Ardha Jamam at 10:00 p.m. Each ritual comprises four steps: abhishekam (sacred bath), alankaram (decoration), naivedyam (food offering) and deepa aradhanai (waving of lamps) for the pedestal of Ekambareswarar. Since it is a Lingam made of sand mound, all the ablution is done only to the pedestal. The worship is held amidst music with nagaswaram (pipe instrument) and tavil (percussion instrument), religious instructions in the Vedas read by priests and prostration by worshippers in front of the temple mast. There are weekly rituals like somavaram and shukravaram, fortnightly rituals like pradosham and monthly festivals like amavasai (new moon day), kiruthigai or on krittika nakshatram, pournami (full moon day) and chaturthi.

The temple celebrates dozens of festivals throughout the year. The most important of these is the Panguni (or Phalguni in devanagari) Brahmotsavam that lasts ten days during the Tamil month of Panguni, between March and April, concluding with the celebration of Kalyanotsavam. The festival is the most popular of all the temple festivals in Kanchipuram. There are various processions during the ten days with the festive images of presiding deities of the temple carried in various mounts around the streets of the temple. During the fifth day, Ekambareswarar is carried silver mount Nandi during the morning and Ravaneswara Vahanam during the evening. The 63 Nayanmars are taken in procession the sixth day morning, while Ekambareswarar is carried on Silver car festival in the evening. Silver Mavadi seva is performed on the ninth day. On the concluding day, Kalyanotsavam (marriage festival) is held when the marriage of Ekambareswarar is enacted. During the day, many unmarried people get married irrespective of their caste along with the deity. The event is witnessed by thousands of people every year.
