= Kachiyappar =

Indian poet

Kachiyappar (Tamil: கச்சியப்பர், romanized: Kachiyappar) was an 8th-century Tamil temple priest as well as a poet and Vedantist. He is the author of the Kanda Puranam, written between the years 600 and 750 CE.

== Personal life ==
Kachiyappar was born in a Shaivite Brahmin family and officiated as a priest in the Ekambareswarar Temple in Kanchipuram, Kumara Kottam Murugan temple, Kanchipuram.

== Works ==
=== Kanda Puranam ===
Kachiyappar's greatest composition was the Kanda Puranam, which is the Tamil adaptation of the Sanskrit Skanda Purana. The metres have been composed in the same style as the former. It is made up of six volumes comprising a total of 13,305 stanzas. According to Kachiyapper's preface to Parasurama Mudaliar's Kandha purana Vachagam, the work was completed in the Saka year 700 corresponding to 778 CE.

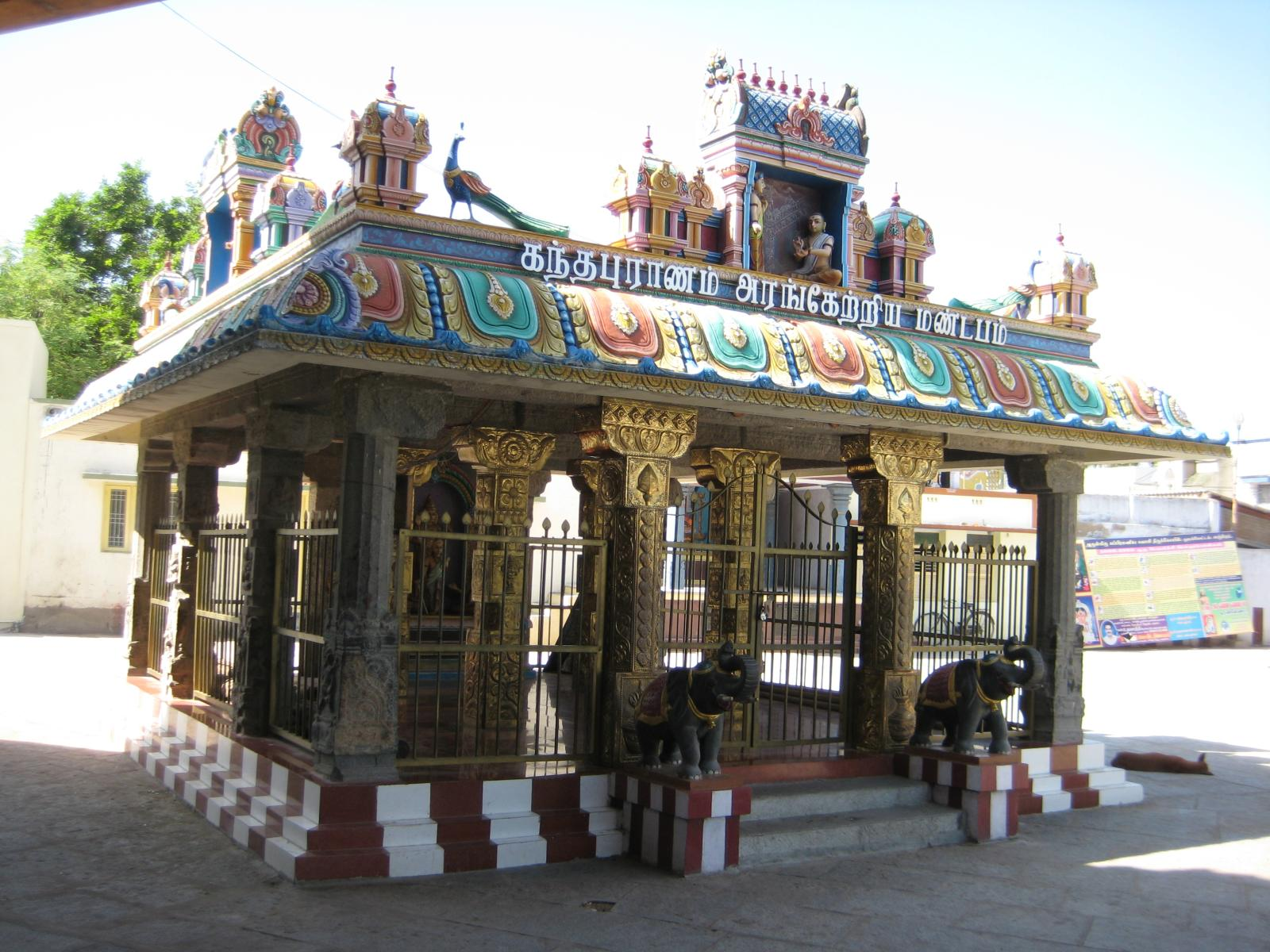
Mantapam (Hall) in the Kumarakottam Temple complex where the epic Kanda Puranam was composed

According to tradition, the first line of the first stanza was written by Kachiyappar's patron deity, Murugan himself. The god is also believed to have corrected the 100 stanzas written by the priest during the day. The poet is regarded to have taken his composition to the god and rehearsed it.

The hall Kandhapurāna Arangetra Mantapam (An outdoor pavilion) where Kachiyappar composed the text still exists in the temple complex. To the present day, the priests in the temple are the descendants of Kachiyappar.

== Bibliography ==
- Chitty, Simon Casie (1859). The Tamil Plutarch, containing a summary account of the lives of poets and poetesses of Southern India and Ceylon. Jaffna: Ripley & Strong. p. 31.
- Pillai, M. S. Purnalingam (1904). A Primer of Tamil Literature. Ananda Press.
- Rao, P. V. L. Narasimha (2008). Kanchipuram: Land of Legends, Saints and Temples. Readworthy. ISBN 978-81-89973-54-4.
- Spuler, Bertold (1975). Handbook of Oriental Studies. BRILL. ISBN 978-90-04-04190-5.
