= Thavil =

Percussion instrument from Tamil Nadu

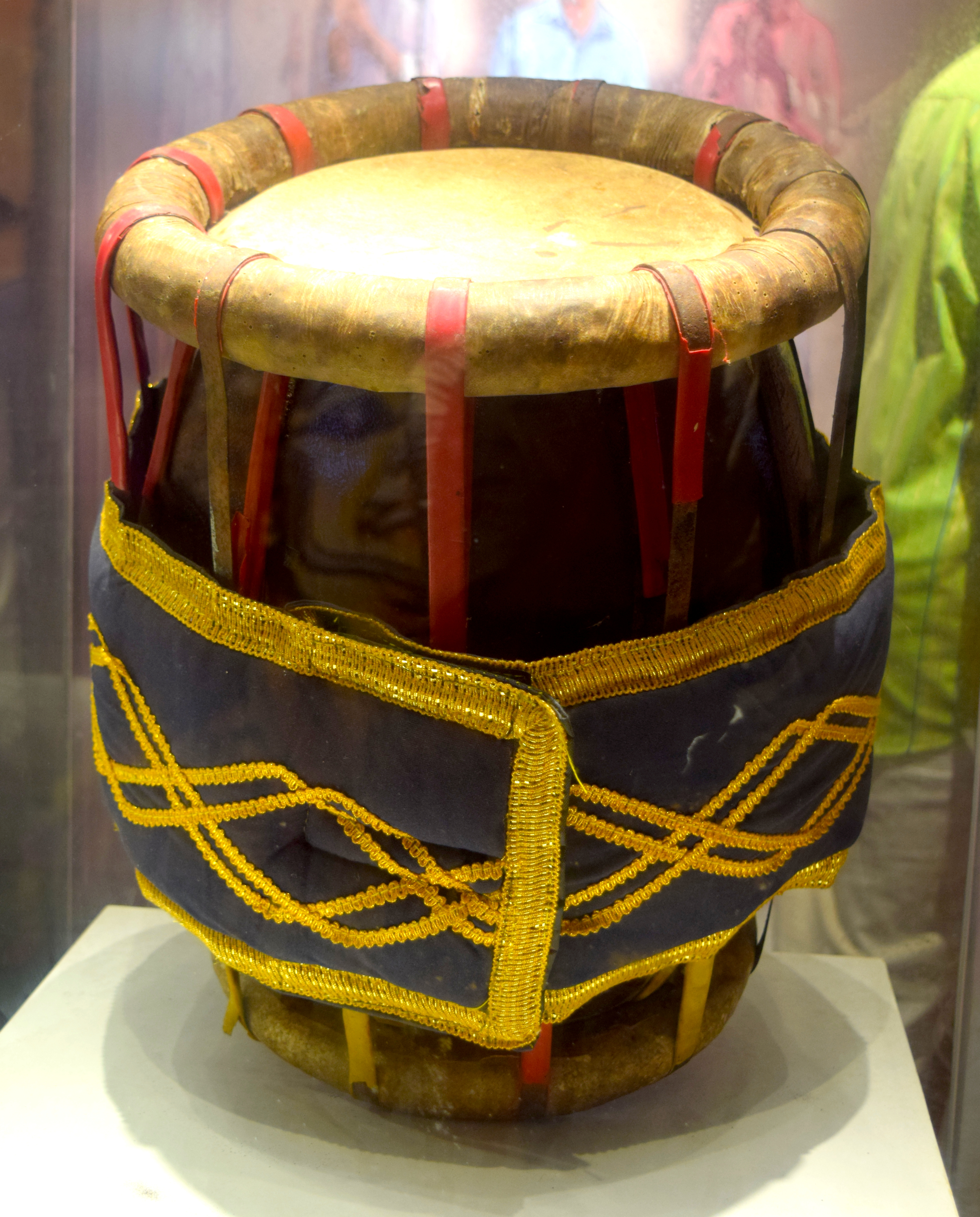
Thavil

A thavil (Tamil:தவில்) or tavil is a barrel-shaped percussion instrument from Tamil Nadu also called Natuva molam in Eelam. It is also widely used in other South Indian states (Andhra Pradesh, Karnataka, Kerala, Telangana) as well as in the North and East of Sri Lanka (in the Tamil majority area called Tamil Eelam). It is used in temple, folk and Carnatic music, often accompanying the nadaswaram. The thavil and the nadaswaram are essential components of traditional festivals and ceremonies in South India.

In folk music contexts, a pair of wider, slimmer sticks are sometimes used. In Tamil Filmi songs, thavils are mostly used. Notable movies: Thillaanaa Mohanambal, Paruthiveeran, Karagattakaran.

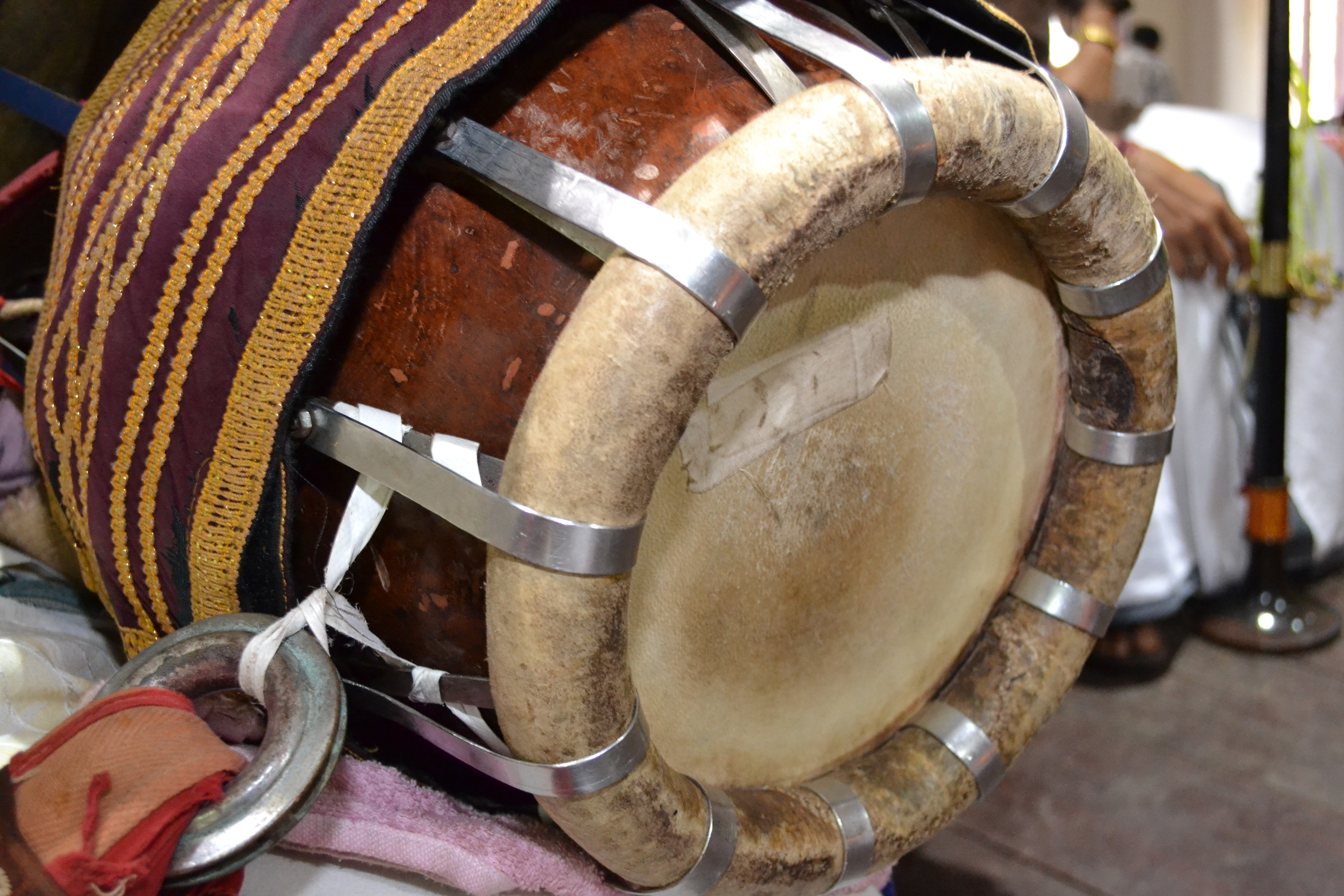
Thavil

== History ==
Thavil is a traditional musical instrument of the ancient city of Thanjavur in Tamil Nadu. It is an integral part of the Carnatic music in Thanjavur. It is mostly made in Thanjavur and Valayapatti.

== Physical components ==
The thavil consists of a cylindrical shell hollowed out of a solid block of jackfruit wood. Layers of animal skin, water buffalo on the bigger opening (high sound) and goat on the smaller opening (low sound), are stretched across the sides of the shell using hemp hoops attached to the shell. The right face of the instrument has a larger diameter than the left side, and the right drum head is stretched very tightly, while the left drum head is kept loose to allow pitch bending. The larger face is higher in pitch than the smaller face.

The modern Thavil has a corpus that is bordered by a steel ring coated in plastic on which the two skins are fixed by metal straps. Both skins can be separately tuned.

== Methods of use and posture ==
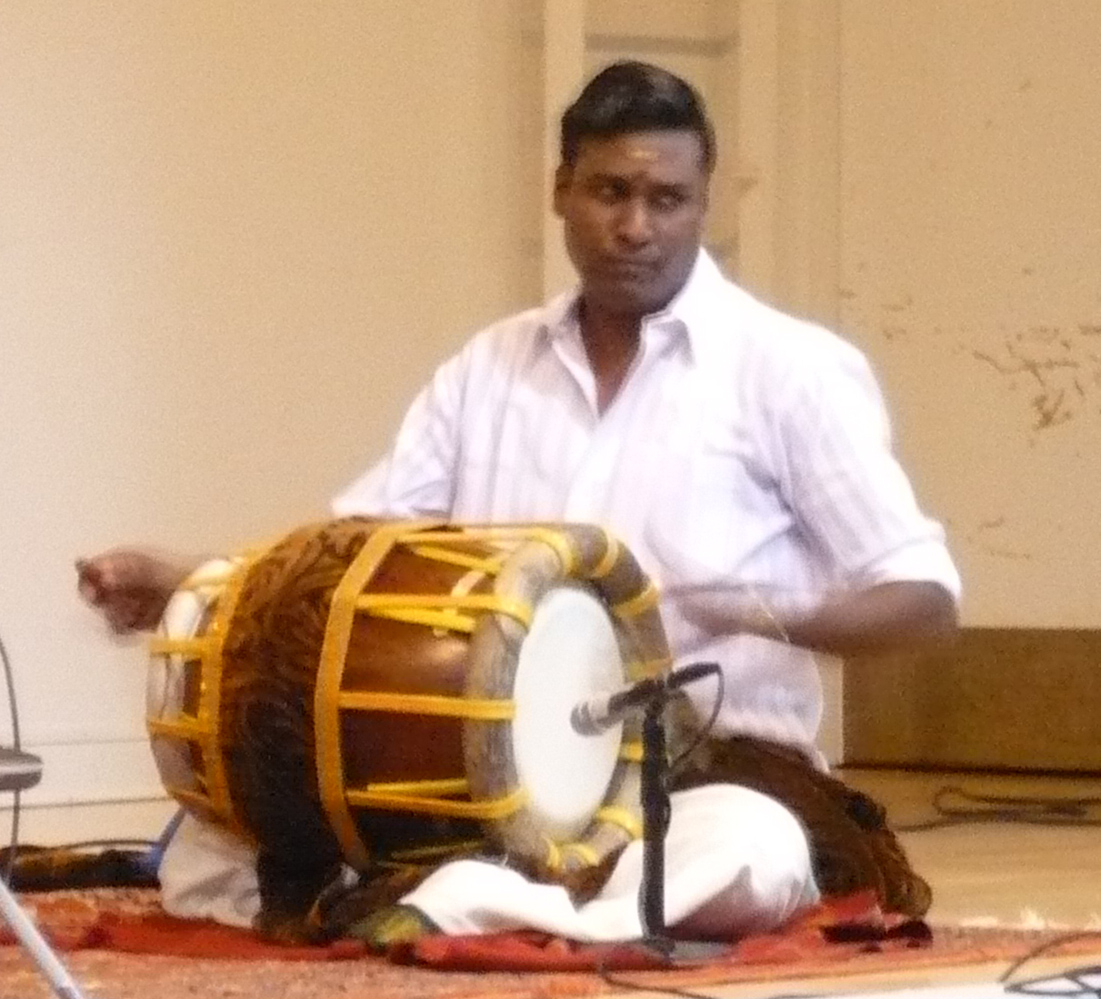
Velliyambakkam VM Palanivel playing thavil - note that thavil sides are reversed, as the player is left handed

The instrument is either played while sitting, or hung by a cloth strap (called nadai) from the shoulder of the player. The right head is played with the right hand, wrist and fingers. The player usually wears thumb caps on all the fingers of the right hand, made of hardened glue from maida flour. The left head is played with a short, thick stick made from the wood of the portia tree. It is not uncommon for left-handed players to use the opposite hands, and some nadaswaram groups feature both a right- and a left-handed thavil player.

== Veteran thavilists ==
Some master thavil players:

- Thirumulaivayil Muthuveer Pillai
- Thirumulaivayil Shanmugavadivel Pillai
- Valangaiman A. Shanmugasundaram Pillai
- Kalaimamani Thirucherai.T.G.Muthukumaraswamy Pillai
- Valayapatti A. R. Subramaniam
- Haridwaramangalam A. K. Palanivel
- Vellore Dr. P.R.M. Venkateshan
- Dakshinamoorthy - Jaffna or Yaazhpaanam - Sri Lanka
- Needamangalam Meenakshi Sundaram Pillai
- Thirunageshwaram Subramanian Pillai
- Bhusurapalli Adisheshaiah
- Iluppur Panchami
- Kumbakonam Thangavel Pillai
- Natchiarkoil Raghava Pillai
- Perumpallam P. Venkatesan
- Needamangalam Shanmugavadivel
- Valangaiman Shanmugasundaram Pillai
- Thiruvalaputhur T A Kaliyamurthy
- Tanjore T. R. Govindaraj
- Shanmugam Thavil - Puducherry
- Thiruppungur T. G. Muthukumarasamy
- Mannaarkudi Thiru M. R. Vasudevan
- Thirumaignanam Narayanasamy Pillai
- Valiyambakkam V. M. Ganapathy
- Gurumurthy Pandithar - Adelaide
- Thirurameshwaram T. B. Radhakrishnan
