= Haridwaramangalam A. K. Palanivel =

Indian musician

Haridwaramangalam A. K. Palanivel (1948 in Tamil Nadu, India) is an artist of the Indian drum thavil.

A. K. Palanivel first learnt thavil drumming under the tutelage of his father S. Kumaravel. From 1959 onwards, he was given extensive training to T.G. Muthukumara Swamy Pillai. He has performed widely in India and abroad accompanying senior artists and participating in ensembles of instrumental music and also dance. In 2001 he received the Sangeet Natak Akademi Award. The Government of India awarded him the fourth highest civilian award of Padma Shri in 2004.
