= Namagiripettai Krishnan =

Carnatic musician

- Born: Namagiripettai Kathan Krishnan; 2 April 1924; Namagiripettai, Tamilnadu
- Died: 30 April 2001 (aged 77)

Namagiripettai K Krishnan (2 April 1924 – 30 April 2001) was a Carnatic musician who played the Nadaswaram. He was born in Namagiripettai village and lived in Sendamangalam, Namakkal district, Tamil Nadu, India. He gave many performances across the country. In 1981, Krishnan was awarded the Padma Shri by the Indian government for his contributions to Carnatic music. He was also the Asthana Sangeetha Vidwan for the Tirumala Venkateswara Temple.

== Awards ==
- Padma Shri by the Indian government in 1981
- Kalaimamani by Tamil Nadu government in 1972
- Nadaswara chakravarthi title by Thanthai Periyar EV Ramaswamy in 1974
- "Sangeetha Nadaka academy" award in 1982
- "Isai Peraringar" honored by Tamil Isai Sangam Chennai in 1984
