= Valayapatti =

- Village
- Country: India
- State: Tamil Nadu
- District: Virudhunagar district

Population (2011)
  - Total: 1,500

Languages
  - Official: Tamil
- Time zone: UTC+5:30 (IST)
- PIN: 626127
- Telephone code: 04562
- Vehicle registration: TN-67
- Nearest city: Sivakasi
- Sex ratio: 1 : 1 ♂/♀
- Literacy: 75%
- Lok Sabha constituency: Sivakasi
- Climate: Dry and Hot (Köppen)
- Avg. summer temperature: 40 °C (104 °F)
- Avg. winter temperature: 30 °C (86 °F)

Valayapatti is a village in Virudhunagar district, Tamil Nadu, India.

Its pincode is 626127.

Population: about 1,500 as of 2011

== Famous temples in Valayapatti ==
- Kaaliyamman Temple
- Senthatti Ayyanar Temple
- Sellimariyamman Temple
- Oorani Pillaiyar
- Venkatesha Perumal Temple

== Schools ==
Valayapatti has a primary school called Hindu Primary School.
