= Bodamalai Betta =

Bodamalai Betta Bodamalai Mountain
- Reserve forest
- Location in Tamil Nadu, India
- Coordinates: 11.914167°N 77.554444°E
- Country: India
- State: Tamil Nadu
- District: Salem District
- Governing body: Tamil Nadu Forest Department
- Talukas: Mettur

Languages
  - Official: Tamil
- Time zone: UTC+5:30 (IST)
- Nearest city: WxNW of Mettur (29.6 km (18.4 mi))
- IUCN category: V
- Drainage basin: Palar River
- Highest_elevation: 1,200 m (3,900 ft) AMSL
- Public access: off-trail trekking year-round, free, no services
- Climate: Cwa (Köppen)
- Precipitation: 1,600 millimetres (63 in)
- Avg. summer temperature: 33.2 °C (91.8 °F)
- Avg. winter temperature: 15.1 °C (59.2 °F)

Bodamalai Betta is a 1,200 metres (3,937.0 ft) mountain in the Eastern Ghats of South India. It is in the hills 20 kilometres (12.4 mi) west of the Stanley Reservoir in Salem District of Tamil Nadu state, India.

== Geography ==
Elevation is 1,200 metres (3,937.0 ft). It is the tallest of a distinct area of hills covering an area about10 km (6.2 mi) east-west and 7 km (4.3 mi) km north–south, all with elevation below600 metres (1,968.5 ft), surrounded by valleys on the south, west and north and plains to the east. Bodamalai Betta is in a strong (VI) earthquake zone, with on average one every 50 years, with magnitude of 5–6 on the Richter magnitude scale.

3 kilometres (1.9 mi) to the north of the peak is the east–west valley of the Palar River, a minor tributary of the Kaveri River There is a local road along the river.

The nearest town is Chinna Cottai18 kilometres (11 mi) by road in Chamarajanagar district, Karnataka state.

== Climate ==
Bodamalai Betta is in an area with a Humid subtropical climate. April is warmest month with an average temperature of 91.76 °F (33.20 °C) at noon. January is coldest with an average temperature of 59.18 °F (15.10 °C) at night. Temperatures drop sharply at night. February is on average the month with most sunshine. Rainfall and other precipitation peaks around October. January is the driest month.
