= Mettur Dam =

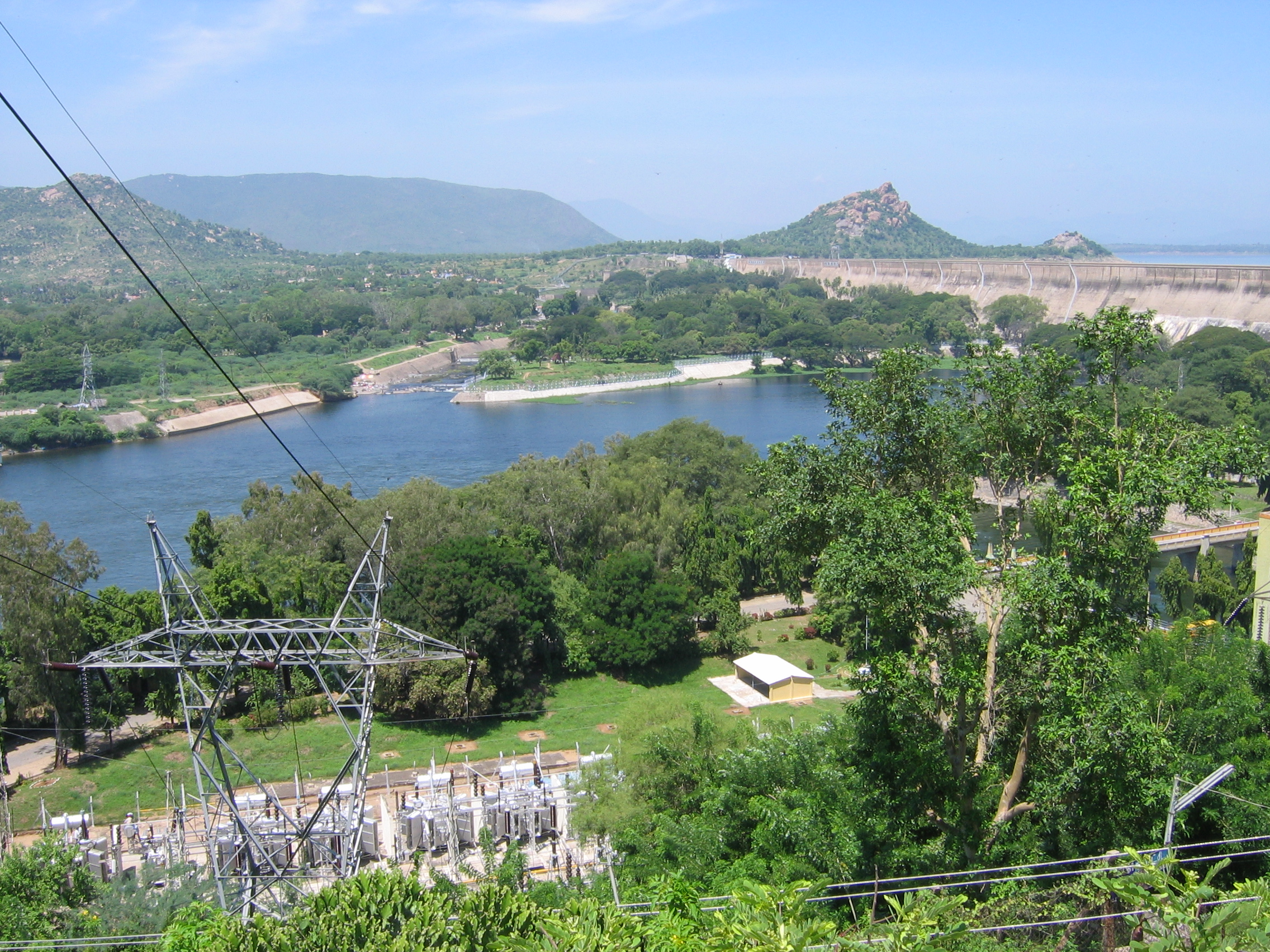
- Interactive map of Mettur Dam
- Location: Mettur, Salem District, Tamil Nadu, India
- Coordinates: 11°48′00″N 77°48′00″E
- Construction began: 1925
- Opening date: 1934
- Operator: Water Resources Department

Dam and spillways
- Height: 120 feet (37 m)
- Length: 1,700 metres (5,600 ft)

Reservoir
- Creates: Stanley Reservoir
- Capacity: 93.4 billion ft^{3} (2.64 km^{3}) (OR) 93.5 tmc ft (OR) 2,146,071 acre ft

Details in Tamil

The Mettur Dam is one of the largest dams in India, built during colonial rule, and the largest in Tamil Nadu, located across the river Kaveri where it enters the plains. Built in 1934, it took nine years to complete. The maximum height and width of the dam are 214 and 171 feet, respectively. The dam receives inflows from its own catchment area, Kabini Dam and Krishna Raja Sagara Dams located in Karnataka. The dam provides irrigation and drinking water facilities for more than 12 districts of Tamil Nadu and hence is revered as the life and livelihood-giving asset of Tamil Nadu. There is a park at the base of the dam.

== History ==
It was constructed under the supervision of an Irish engineer, Vincent Hart, who was also the chief engineer of the project. It took nine years and the effort of 17,000 men to complete the dam project. After the construction was complete, Mettur Dam over Kaveri became the largest dam in the world. The funds were provided from the taxes collected in the Madras Presidency. The Board of Revenue was headed by Sir C.P. Ramaswamy Iyer who initiated the building of the dam. As a result, the dam authorities evacuated the people of Nayambadi and some other villages where the dam was sited. When the water level of the reservoir recedes, even now old Christian Church of Nayamabadi and some Hindu temples from other villages emerge from it as proof. Those people who migrated from Nayambadi have settled down in Martalli, Cowdalli and other nearby villages in the Kollegal taluk of Chamarajanagar district of the state of Karnataka.

== Capacity ==
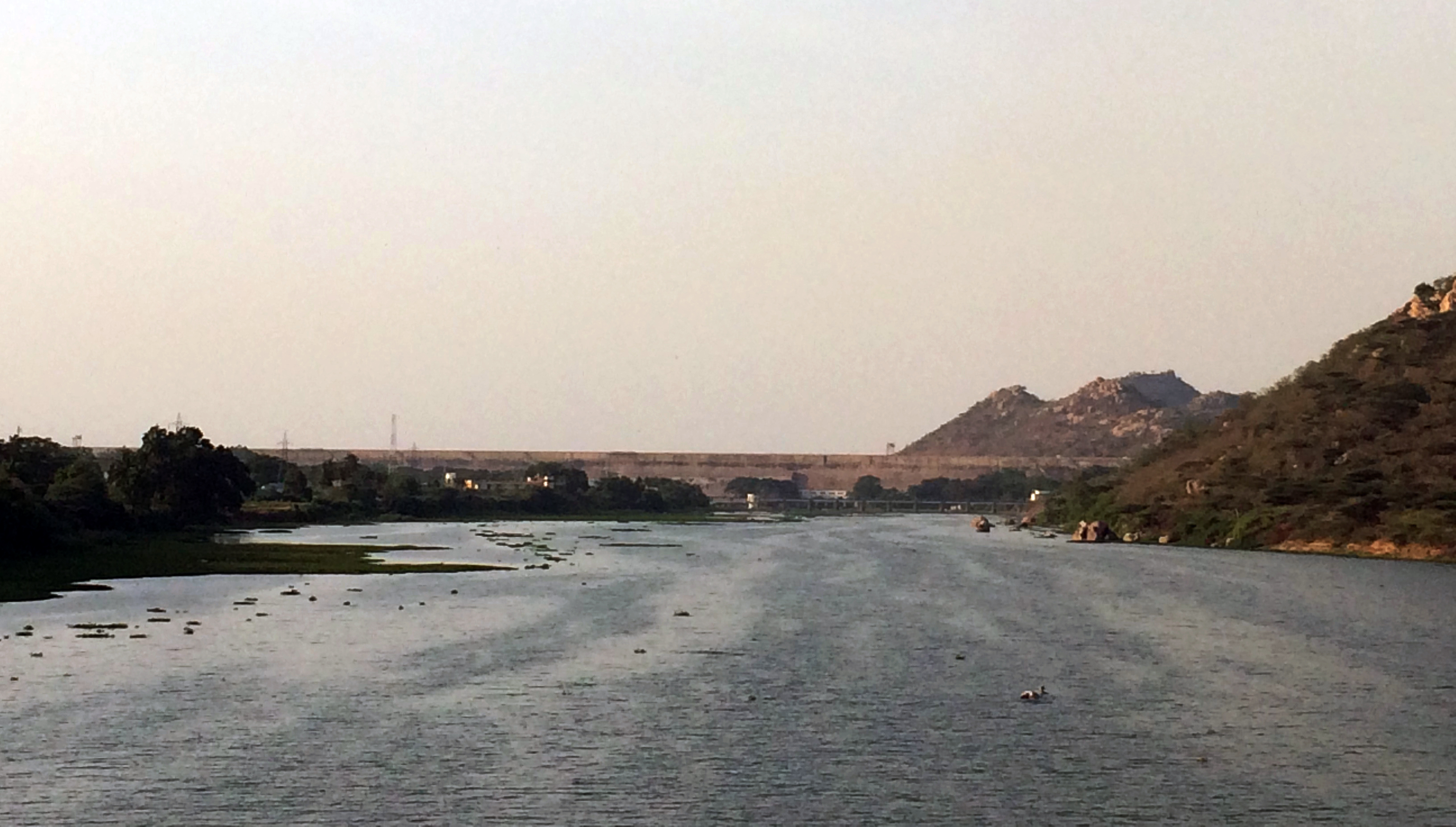
River Cauvery crossing Mettur Dam

The total length of the dam is 1,700 metres (5,600 ft). The dam creates Stanley Reservoir. The Mettur Hydro Electrical power project is also quite large. The dam, the park, the major hydroelectric power stations, and hills on all sides make Mettur a tourist attraction. Upstream from the dam is Hogenakkal Falls. The maximum level of the dam is 120 ft (37 m) and the maximum capacity is 93.47 tmc ft. As of 2004, the capacity of the dam was 1994.19 MCM (million cubic meters) (70.5 tmc ft) due to sedimentation. Area of reservoir is 42.5 square kilometers.

Its capacity of 93.4 billion cubic feet (2.64 km^{3}) is nearly twice that of its Karnataka counterpart of KRS; It was built in-line with KRS Dam, which was designed by Sir M Vishveswariah in 1911 and completed in 1931 near Mysore.

== Water dispute ==
The Mettur Dam has received public attention since the latter half of the 20th century, and especially in the mid-1990s, due to the Kaveri River water dispute between the States of Tamil Nadu and Karnataka. Because of subsequent dams constructed across the Cauvery and its tributaries in Karnataka, namely Harangi Dam, Hemavathi Dam, Kabini Dam, following the KRS Dam; Mettur Dam does not receive much water during lean seasons. As a result, the dam nearly goes dry during certain periods of the year, often when water is most needed by the farmers and the general public of Tamil Nadu. This has created serious dispute and tension between the neighbouring states of Karnataka and Tamil Nadu. Governments of the respective states, the Supreme Court, and the Cauvery Tribunal have so far not been successful in resolving the dispute. The tribunal has specified an annual release of 192 tmcft by Karnataka to Tamil Nadu. In the years of deficit in realisation the dispute aggravates in both the states. The major reasons for the deficit are inadequate realisation of Southwest monsoon in the primary catchment areas of the river viz., Kodagu and Wayanad and the over reliance of the river water for irrigation and drinking water schemes in both the states.

== Mettur Surplus Water Scheme ==
Mettur Surplus Water Scheme (also called Sarabanga Lift irrigation project) was announced in the year 2019 by then Chief Minister Edappadi K. Palaniswami at the cost of Rs. 545 crores. The scheme aimed at diverting surplus flood waters released from Mettur dam into 100 dry lakes in the region and use the water for irrigational and drinking water purposes.

When Mettur dam gets filled, the water from the dam is taken to Thimmampatti pump house via canals. Thimmampatti pump house contains two sections, one with ten 940 HP motors and other with six 1080 HP motors. These sections will pump excess water to M.Kallipatti lake and Nangavalli lake respectively via pipelines. The water discharge from M.Kallipatti & Nangavalli lake is anticipated to fill multiple lakes & ponds. Another Pumping station planned near M.Kallipatti lake will pump water to 42 lakes through Vellalapuram and Kannantheri.

The scheme is expected to support agriculture in 4,238 acres of land in 40 villages and provide drinking water to 38 villages. The project got inaugurated in February 2021.

== Gallery ==
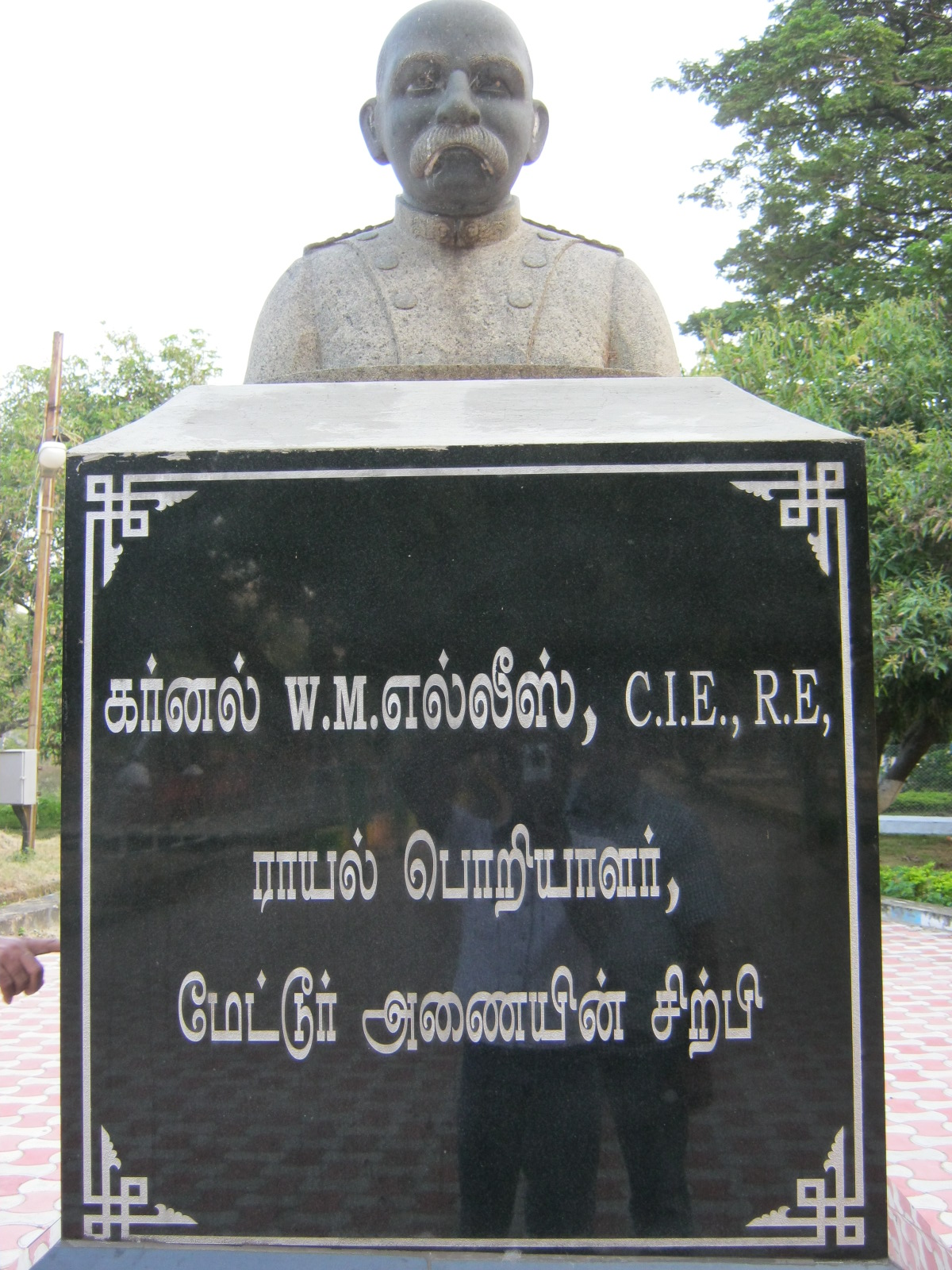
Architect of Mettur Dam Colonel W.M. Ellis, C.I.E, R.E

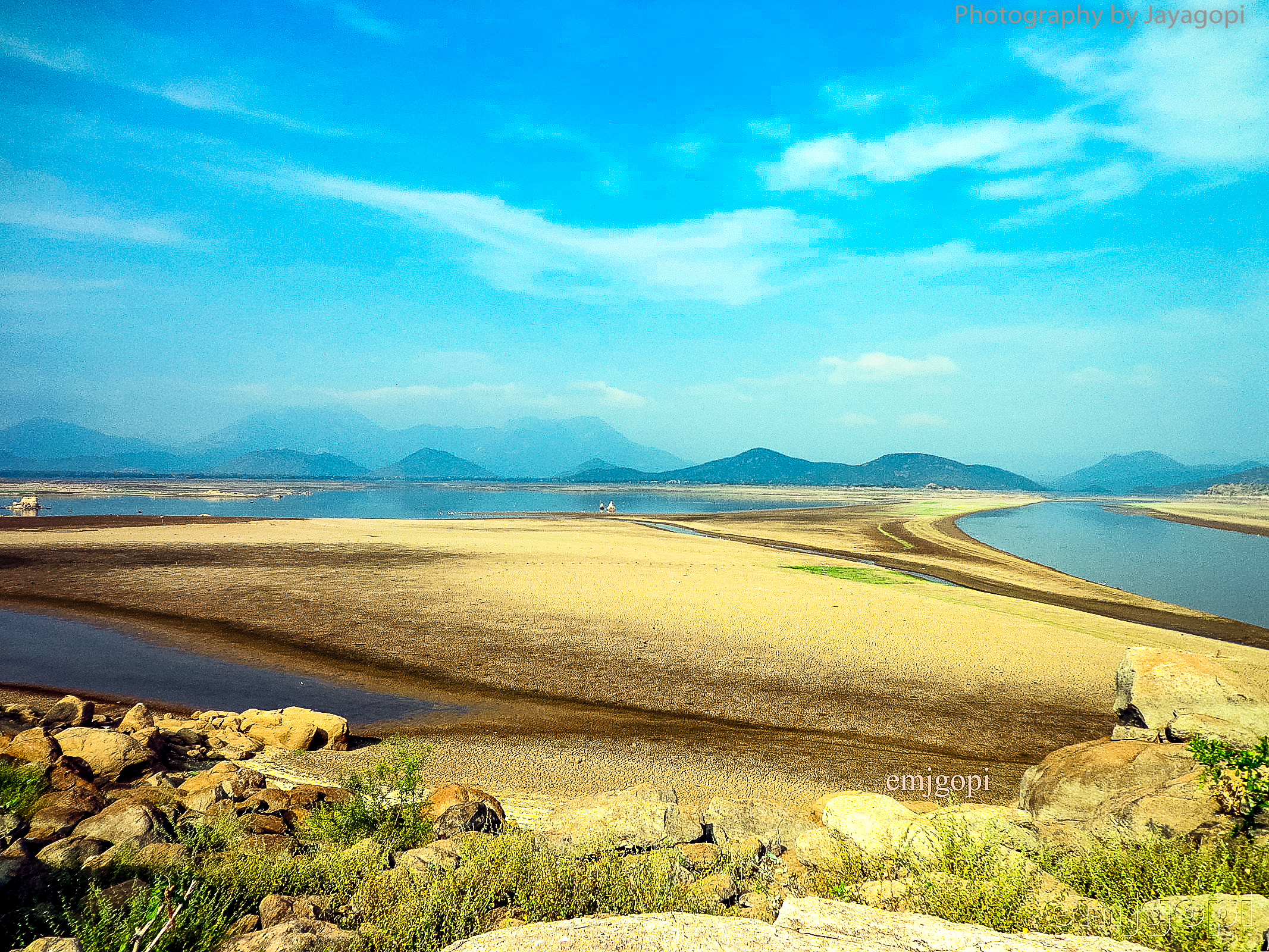
Mettur Pannavadi Nandhi statue and Jalagandeswarar temple submerged into Stanley Reservoir

Mettur Dam View from Base

Mettur Dam – Overflow Bridge

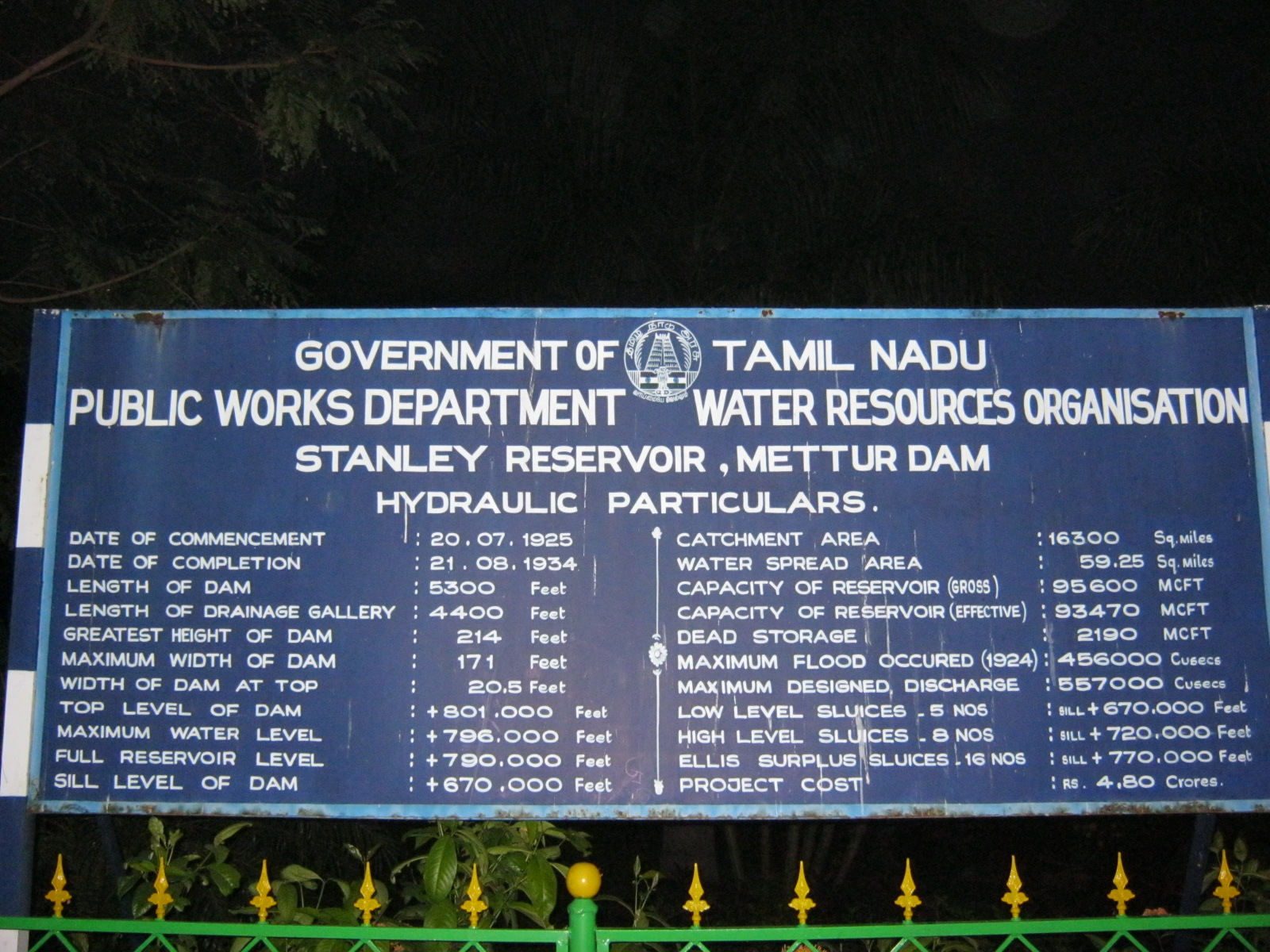
Specification board of Mettur dam

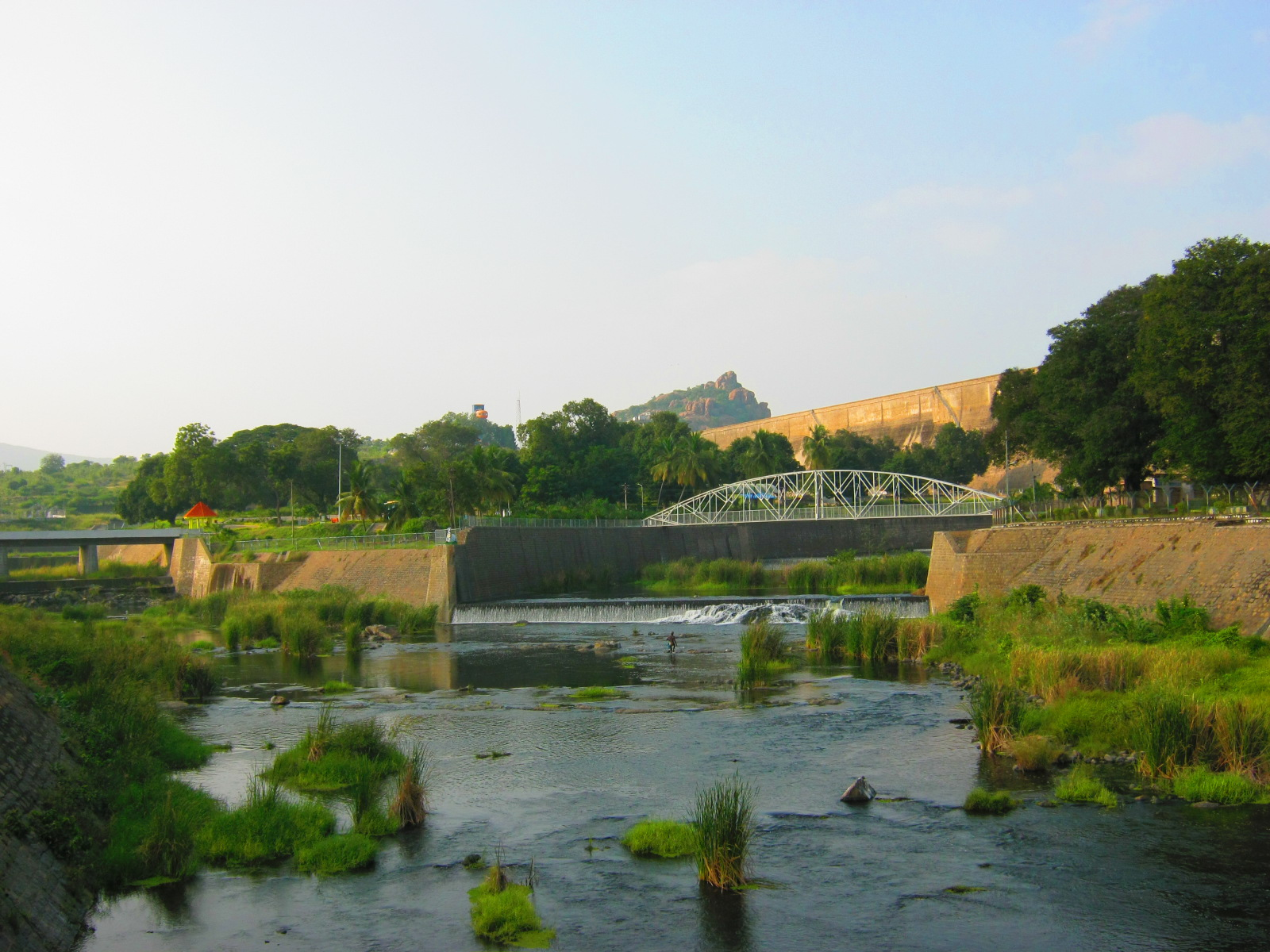
Sluices channels for water draining by the side of the Mettur dam(Low level & High level sluices)

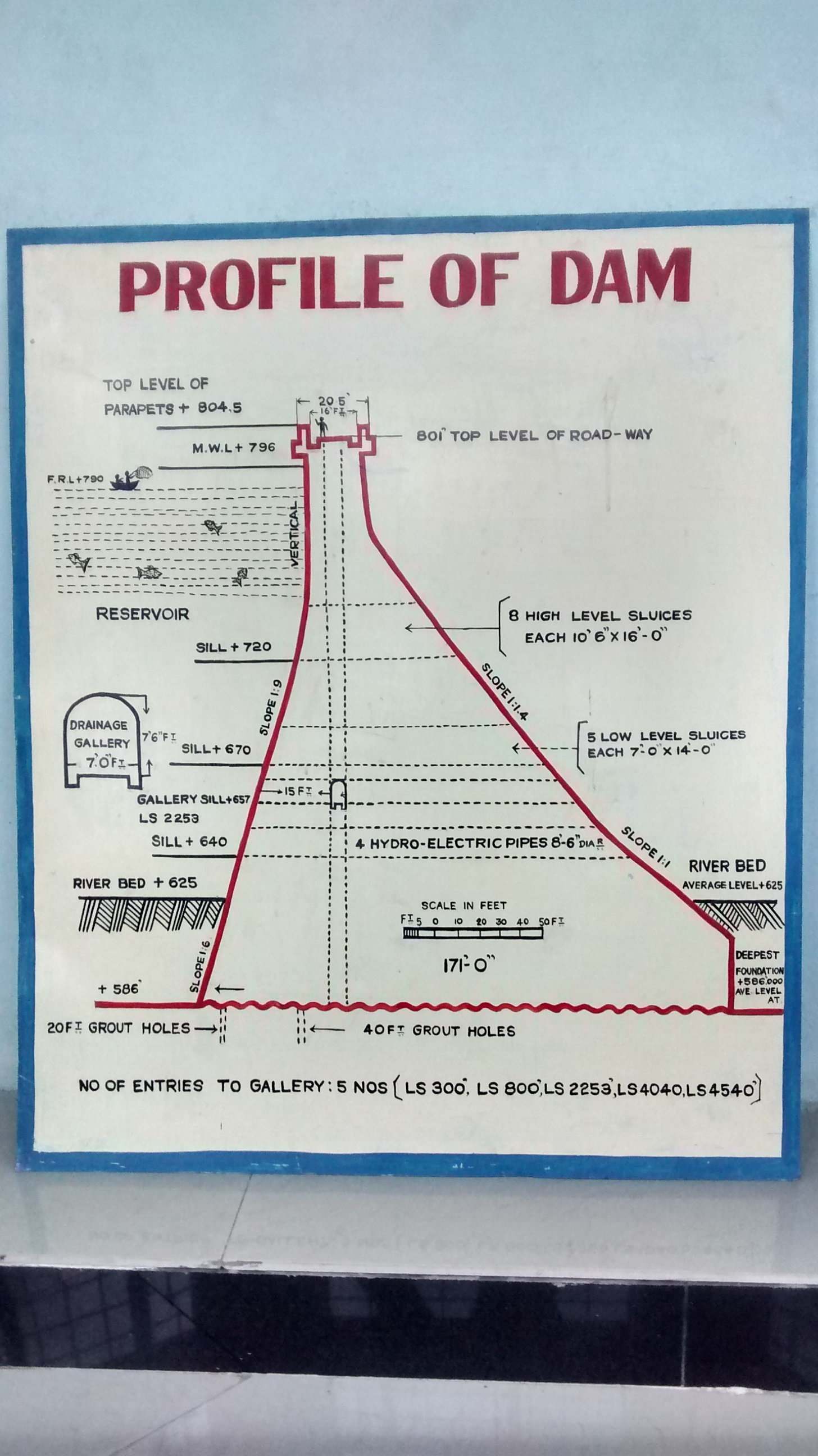
Dam Profile

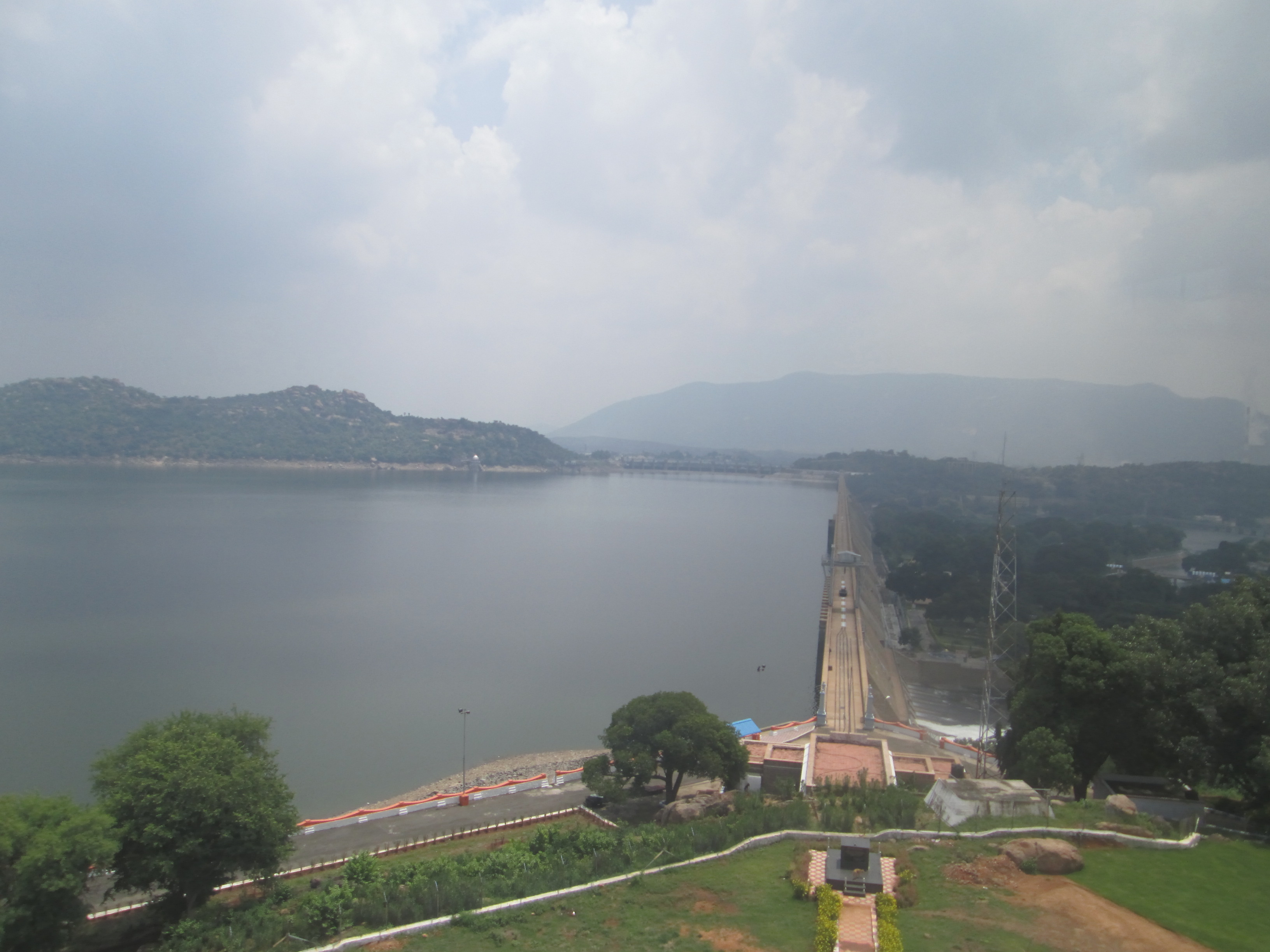
Dam Aerial View from the Platinum Jubilee Watch Tower

== See also ==
- Banasura Sagar Dam
- Stanley Reservoir
- Krishna Raja Sagara
- Grand Anicut
