= Hogenakkal Falls =

Waterfall on Karnataka-Tamil Nadu border

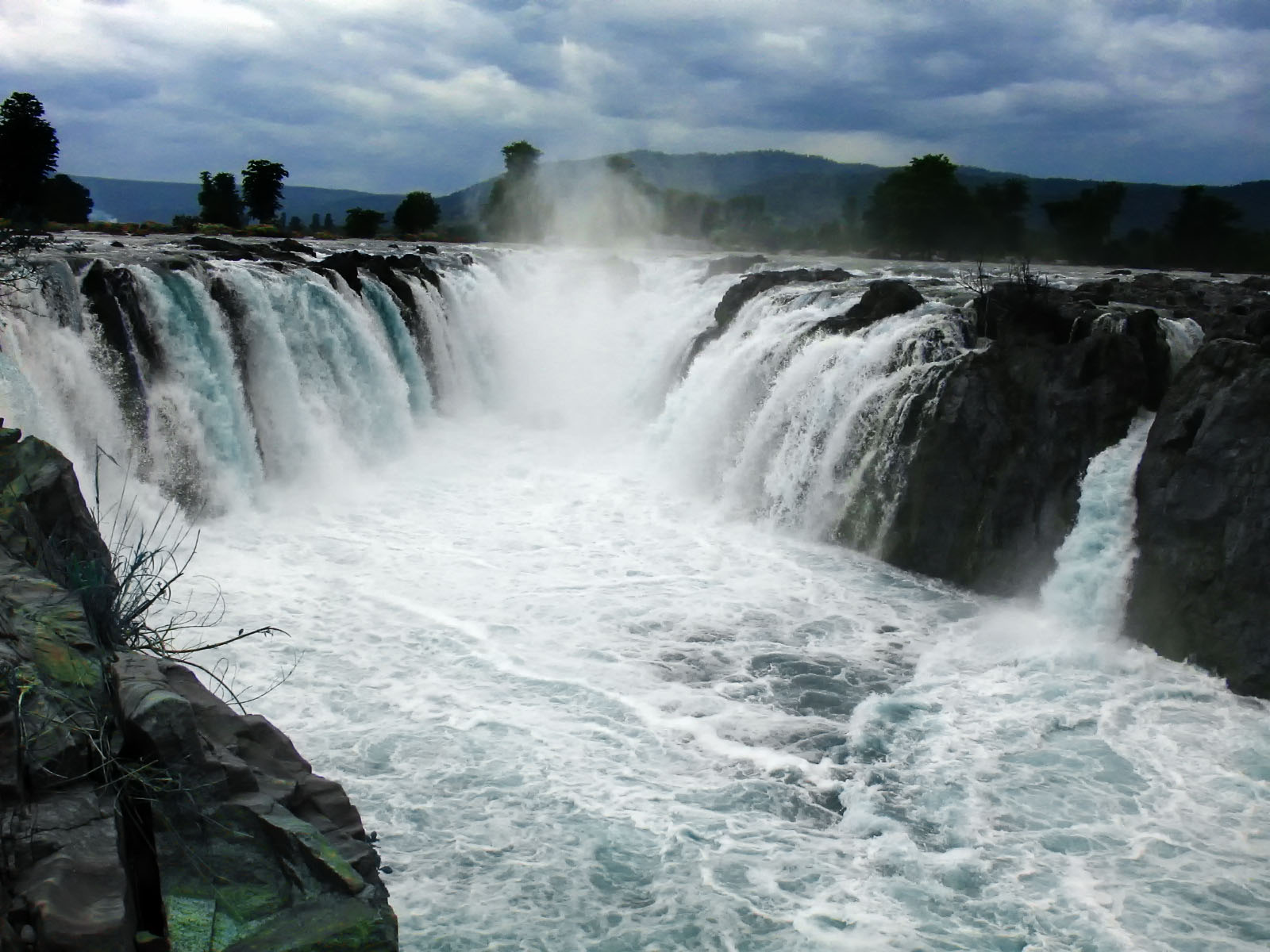
- Hogenakkal Falls
- Interactive map of Hogenakkal Falls
- Location: Tamil Nadu and Karnataka
- Coordinates: 12°07′06″N 77°46′26″E
- Elevation: 700 m (2,300 ft)
- Longest drop: 20 m (66 ft)
- Watercourse: Kaveri river

Hogenakkal Falls is a waterfall in South India on the Kaveri river on the border between Dharmapuri district of Tamil Nadu and Chamrajnagar district of Karnataka. It is located 46 km (29 mi) from Dharmapuri and 199 km (124 mi) from Chamrajnagar. The Government of Tamil Nadu made a proposal to convert the falls into providing drinking water for the state.

== Etymology ==
According to the consensus, the name Hogenakal is derived from Kannada (ಹೊಗೆನಕಲ್) and means ‘Smoky Rocks’. The river when falls on the rock below, the gushing force of water resembles like smoke emanating from the rocks. It is also called as Marikottayam by the people of Tamil Nadu.

However, another etymology related to the Tamil language has recently emerged. Some argue, in relation to the modern Pure Tamil politics in the state of Tamil Nadu, that Hogenakkal is derived from the Tamil Uguneer Kal (உகுநீர் கல் ; possibly meaning ‘Milky water Rocks’).

== Geology ==
Hogenakkal Falls consists of two magmatic dyke made of pyroxenite and interrupted by carbonatite. The rocks in this site are considered to be the oldest of its kind in South Asia and one of the oldest in the world, with the carbonatities dating around 1,994 ± 76 million years ago (in the Orosirian).

== History ==
Hogenakkal falls is mentioned in Sangam Literature as Thalaineer aruvi (தலைநீர் அருவி). All the areas around this waterfalls are called Thalaineer Naadu (தலைநீர் நாடு). It was ruled by the King named Adiyaman Neduman Anji. References to this King and the Falls are found in the Sangam Literatures like Purananooru (புறநானூறு), Agananooru (அகநானூறு), Kurunthogai (குறுந்தொகை) etc.

== River ==
The Kaveri is considered to form at Talakaveri in the Brahmagiri hills in the Western Ghats of south India and gathers momentum as the land drops in elevation. It becomes larger as various tributaries feed into it on the way down. At Hogenakkal, the Kaveri, now a large river, drops and creates numerous waterfalls as the water cuts through the rocky terrain. In places the water falls as much as 20 m (66 ft) and is said to sound like continual thunder. The river carries sediment which makes the downriver land fertile. At Hogenakkal the river spreads out over a wide area of sandy beaches, then flows south to the Mettur Dam and creates a 60 sq mi (160 km^{2}). lake called Stanley Reservoir. Built in 1934, this project improved irrigation and provided hydropower.

== Weather ==
The best season to visit is soon after the monsoons, when the river is in full spate. But some tourists prefer to visit during off-season to skip the crowd. The water temperature in summer varies between 23–34 °C (73–93 °F) while during the winter it ranges from 13–27 °C (55–81 °F).

== Boating ==
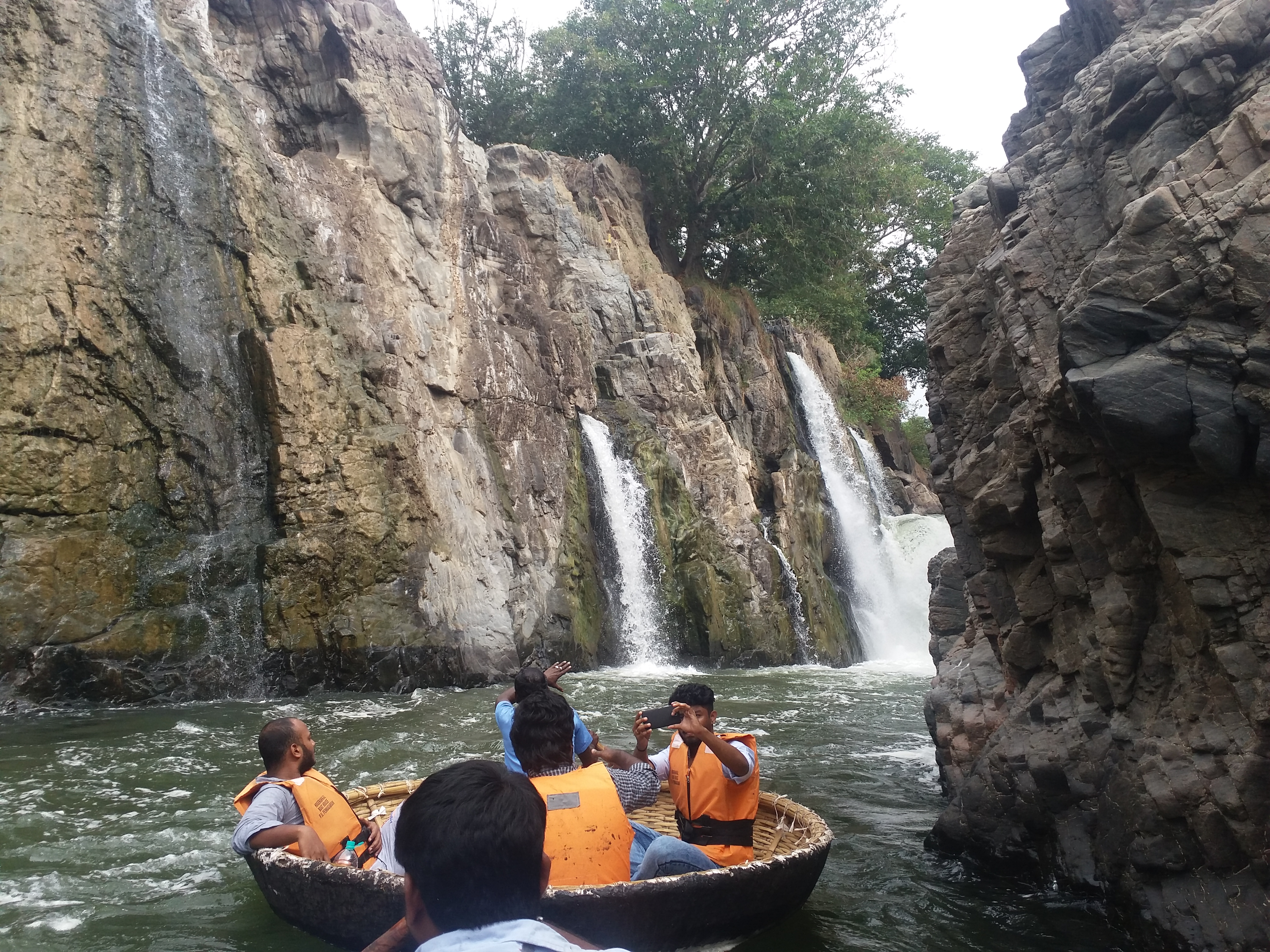
Parisal Boating in Hogenakkal falls

Boating in Hogenakkal is allowed during the dry-season as the falls are not strong enough to disrupt the passage of the boats. This is the main source of income for boat operators. The coracles are about 2.24 m (7 ft 4 in) in diameter and can carry eight people at a time. These coracles are made of bamboo, and with all materials available takes about a day to build. The bottom of the boats are made waterproof by the use of hides, but sometimes with sheets of plastic. Use of plastics in the Hogenakkal vicinity, not just for boats, has been criticised due to problems with pollution. These boats are steered and propelled using a single paddle, making them unique. The coracles are locally called parisal in Tamil and teppa or harigolu in Kannada.

Freshly caught fish are sold by the gorge and also various vendors selling water and snacks up and down the gorge rowing their coracles is not uncommon. The fish caught include katla, robu, kendai, keluthi, valai, mirgal, aranjan and jilaby. After leaving the gorge, on the left shore one can find improvised stalls set up on the sand. There, one can let the fresh fishes be prepared in one of the many kitchens. Also, many people can be found swimming or bathing around there.

== Hogenakkal water project ==
Hogenakal Falls is the location for the Hogenakkal Integrated Drinking Water Project proposed by the Tamil Nadu Government. The objective of this project is to provide safe drinking water to the urban and rural areas in Krishnagiri and Dharmapuri districts. In February 2008, The Japan Bank for International Cooperation agreed to fund the Rs 1,340-crore project.

== Gallery ==
Gallery
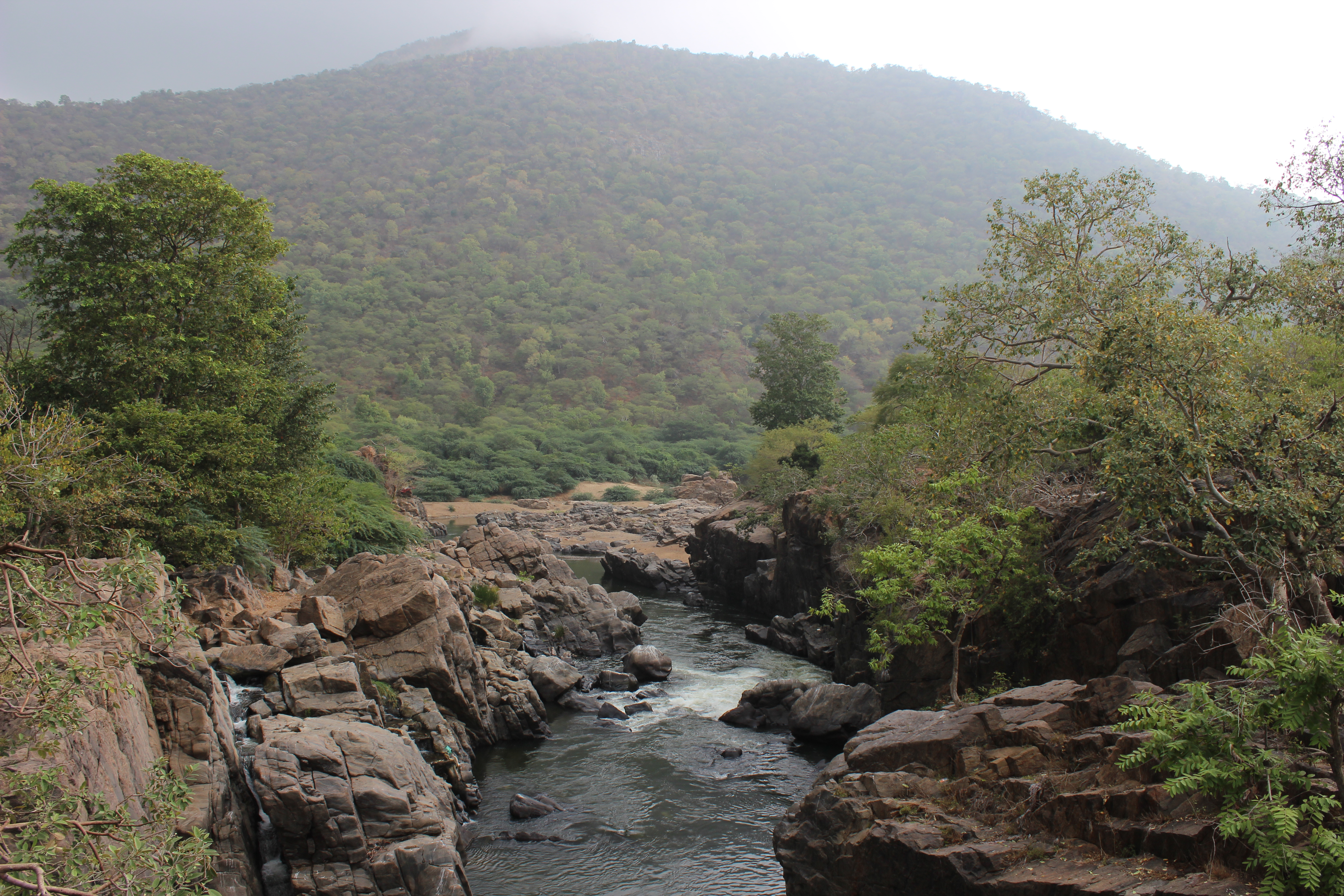
Mountain near the hogenakkal falls

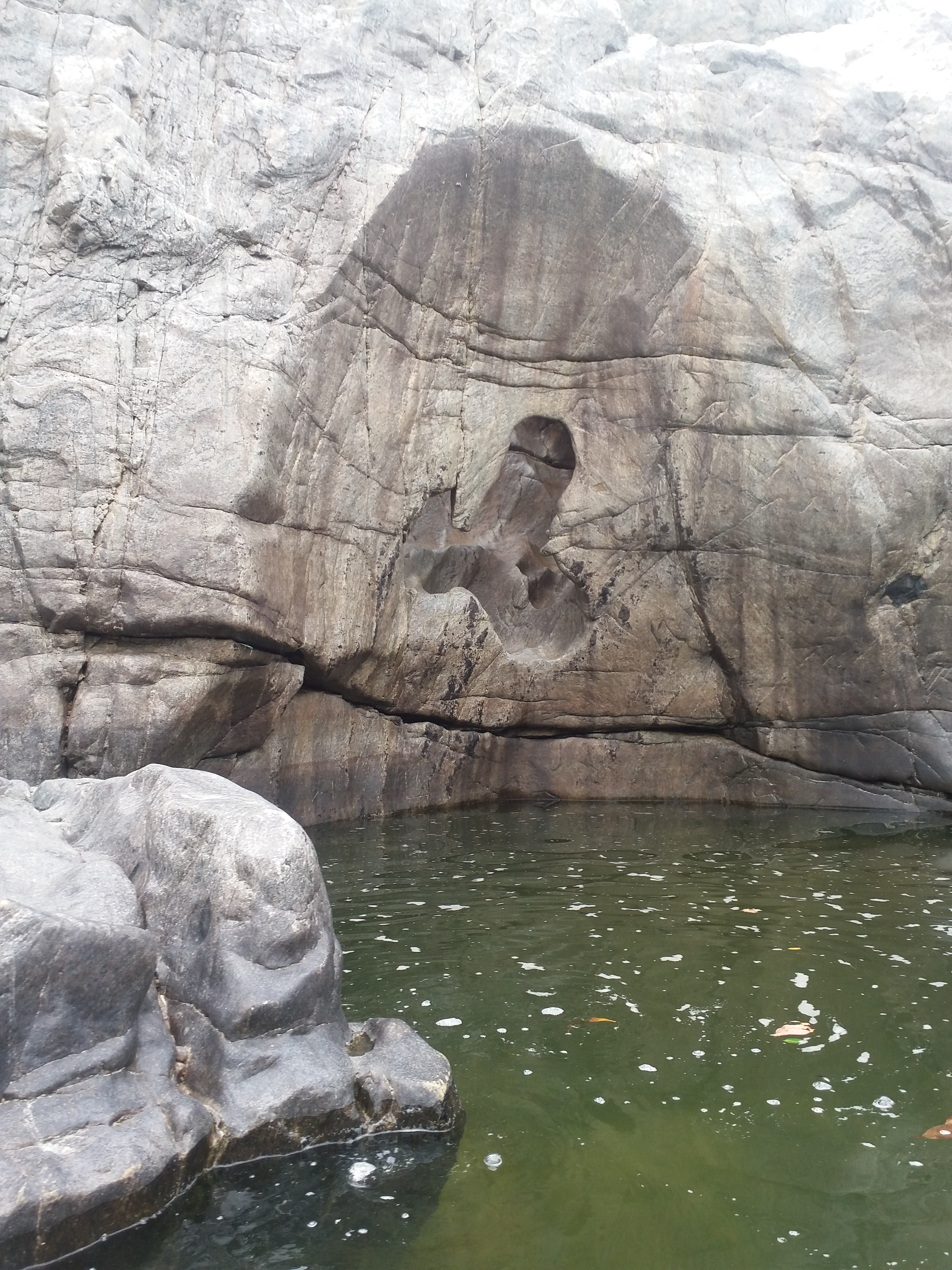
Whirlpool damaged mountain portion in Hogenakkal Falls in Tamil Nadu

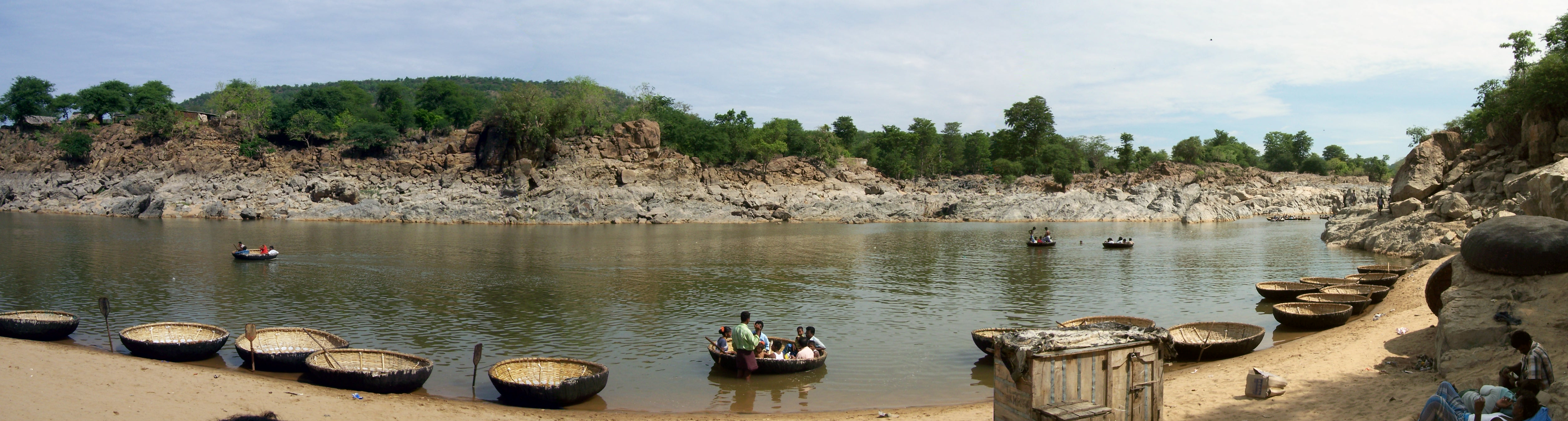
Area near Hogenakkal falls with the coracles beached for picnics

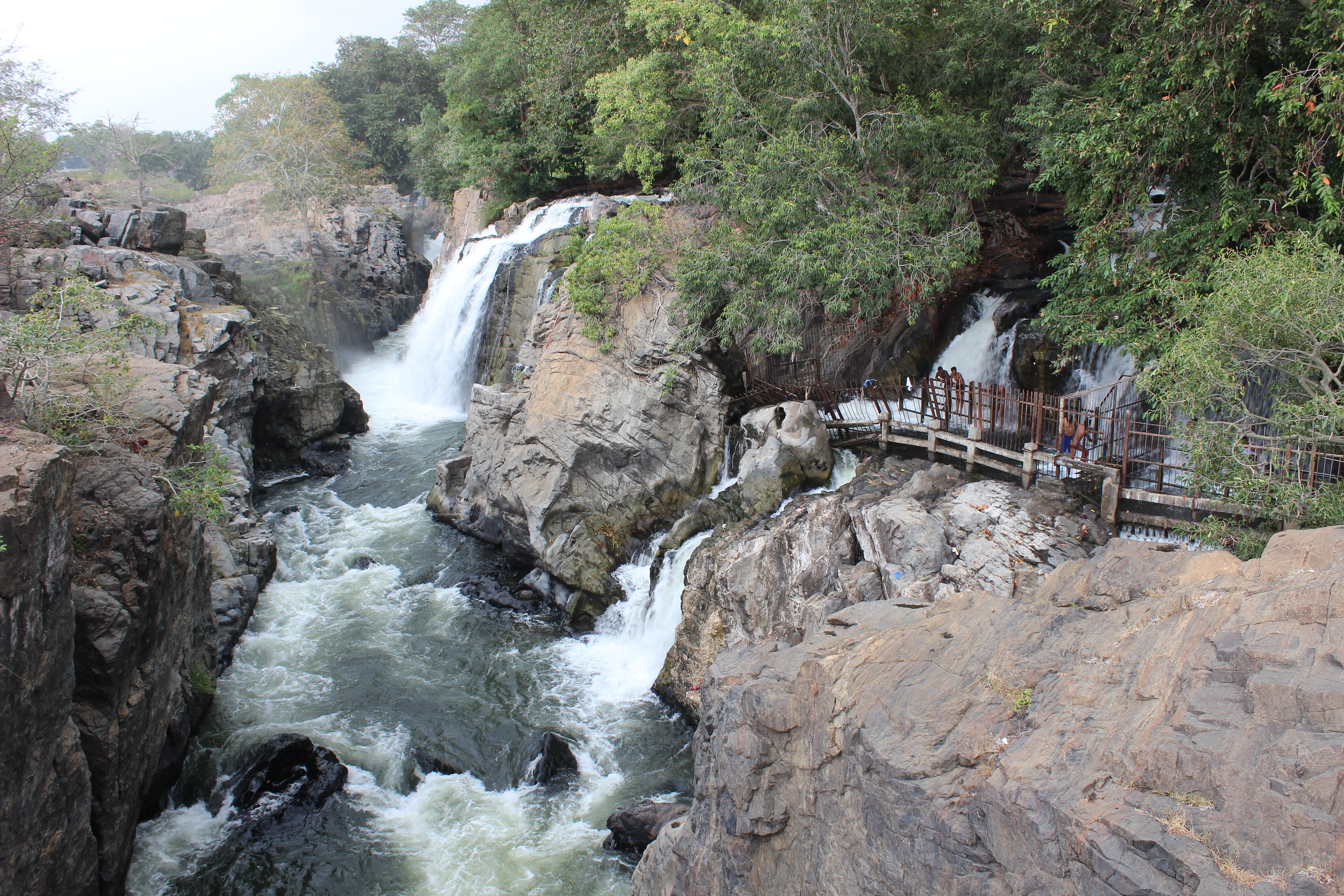
Hogenakkal Falls bathing area

== See also ==
- List of waterfalls
- List of waterfalls in India
- Hogenakkal
