= Mettur =

- Town
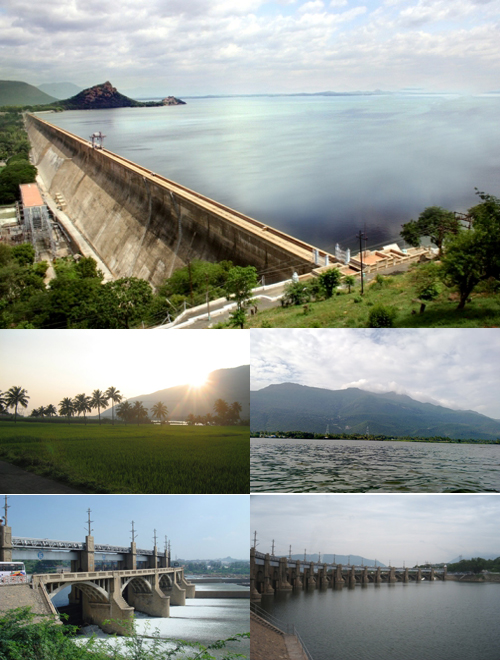
- Mettur Dam

- Location in Tamil Nadu, India
- Coordinates: 11.80°N 77.80°E
- Country: India
- State: Tamil Nadu
- Region: Tamil Nadu
- District: Salem
- Elevation: 238 m (781 ft)

Population (2011)
  - Total: 52,813

Languages
  - Official: Tamil
  - Other: Tamil, English
- Time zone: UTC+5:30 (IST)
- Postal code: 636401
- Vehicle registration: TN-52,93

Mettur is an industrial and tourist town located in the Salem district in the state of Tamil Nadu, India. It is best known for the Mettur Dam which is the largest dam in south India.

Mettur is also known for its power generation, chemical manufacturing, and aluminium production. Most of the water requirements for irrigation in Tamil Nadu is provided by the Mettur Dam. Usually the dam opens in June every year for irrigation in the Kaveri Delta. Mettur is also one of the primary sources of electricity for Tamil Nadu. The Mettur Thermal Power Station acts as a base load power plant for the Tamil Nadu Electricity Board (TNEB). As of 2011, the town had a population of 52,813.

== Geography ==
Ellis Park across Mettur Dam

Poolampatti boat view across Kaveri river

There is a park located at the base of Mettur Dam, where there are a snake park, deer park, and views of the dam. A charge for sightseeing of the dam is fixed.

Nerinjipettai is about 4 kilometres (2.5 mi) from the heart of Mettur at the foot of Palamalai. The hills almost reach out to the river with just the State Highway from Mettur to Erode between the river and the hills. There is boat transportation to Poolampatti, a place known for shooting films.

Pannavadi Parisal Thurai near Kolathur is located 12 kilometres (7.5 mi) far from Mettur. There is a boat transportation in between the Kolathur and Nerupur of Dharmapuri district. The boat transportation also available from Koattaiyur it is 20 kilometres (12 mi) from Mettur. When the water level decreases in Mettur dam, it is possible to see an Old Nandhi statue, an old church, and a palace (Koattai) of Tippu Sultan which has sunk beneath the water.

Palar, located 30 kilometres (19 mi) from Mettur, is at the border for Karnataka and Tamil Nadu State.

Male Mahadeshwara Hills is a famous pilgrimage in Karnataka for lord shiva, located 40 kilometres (25 mi) from Mettur. From there it is also possible to reach Mysore .

One of the famous mariyamman festival celebration during the summer in Tamil term Vaikasi Masam thiruvizha is celebrated in the temple called "sri Anukundu mariyamman kovil" Thiruvizha that temple located in PERIYAR NAGAR near Ukkamparuthikkadu.

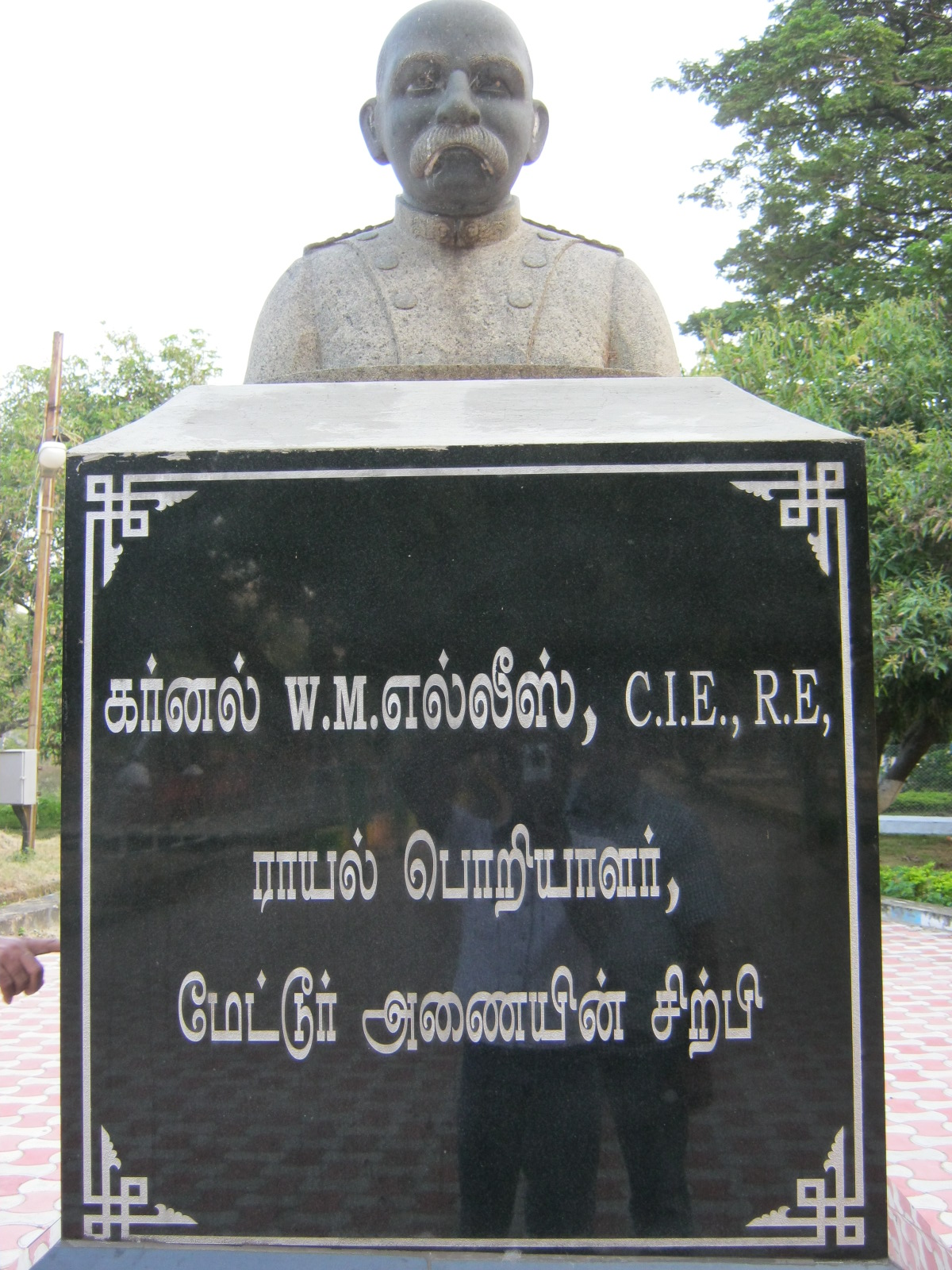
Colonel W.M Ellis

Mettur can be divided into upper and lower Mettur based on whether the part of the town lies upstream or downstream of the river.

Mettur, meaning "town with crests and troughs", obtained its name from the undulating rocky nature of the land that makes the town an ideal place for the dam on Cauvery river.

Mettur is located at border of the Erode, Salem, and Dharmapuri districts, and is approximately one and half hours travel-distance by road from the district headquarters.

Palamalai ("malai" meaning "hill" in Tamil language) is an offshoot of the Eastern Ghats, geographically contiguous with the BR hills Biligiriranga Hills range as they reach out to merge with the Western Ghats at Nilgiris.

The town houses the Stanley Reservoir, which is a standing example of British stone masonry, and the 1,700 metres (5,600 ft) dam. The reservoir capacity touches 120 feet when full, and can rise a few feet beyond its full capacity during surplus seasons.

The town is hemmed to a narrow strip of less than a kilometre in width by the Cauvery let out by the Dam on the east, and Eli Karadu (Mouse hill) on the west. This forms an interesting pattern of three similar peaks with identical longer shoulders to their left, increasing in height from the Dam's crest level about a 1,000 feet (300 m) from sea level in the north to about 4,000 feet (1,200 m) peak in the Palamalai.

=== Stanley Reservoir ===
Mettur Dam, which forms Stanley Reservoir, is constructed across the Kaveri River in Tamil Nadu. It was constructed in 1934 and took 9 years to complete. Maximum height and width of the Dam are 214 and 171 feet respectively. Maximum storage height is 120 feet. Mettur Dam receives the water from both Kabini Dam and Krishna Raja Sagara Dam located in Karnataka. There are 2 hydroelectric power stations in Mettur Dam, the first constructed during British rule and the second during the Indian Republic. There is a park at the base of the dam called Ellis Park maintained by the Tamil Nadu Public Works Department.

=== Electrical power ===
Mettur is one of the sources of electricity for Tamil Nadu. It has thermal and hydroelectric power stations.

The 840-megawatt thermal power station acts as one of the base load power plants for Tamil Nadu each. A new power station has also been constructed with a capacity of 600 megawatts.

There are two hydroelectric power stations at Mettur, called Dam and Tunnel Power Houses, respectively. Dam Power House has a capacity of 40 MW, and Tunnel Power House has a capacity of 200 MW.

Mettur also has several barriage power houses located in the bank of Kaveri River, namely Chekkanur, Nerinjipettai, Koneripatti, UratchiKottai, and Bhavani Kattalai Barriage.

It has one of the largest private sector power suppliers in Madras Aluminium Company (MALCO), which has a power generation capacity of 100 MW from four units of 25 MW each.

=== Climate ===
Climate data for Mettur (Mettur Dam) 1981–2010, extremes 1951–2006
Month	Jan	Feb	Mar	Apr	May	Jun	Jul	Aug	Sep	Oct	Nov	Dec	Year
Record high °C (°F)	37.6 (99.7)	39.0 (102.2)	40.9 (105.6)	41.6 (106.9)	42.4 (108.3)	42.0 (107.6)	39.4 (102.9)	38.0 (100.4)	38.9 (102.0)	38.0 (100.4)	37.6 (99.7)	34.4 (93.9)	42.4 (108.3)
Mean daily maximum °C (°F)	31.9 (89.4)	34.5 (94.1)	37.0 (98.6)	37.9 (100.2)	37.9 (100.2)	35.5 (95.9)	34.6 (94.3)	34.1 (93.4)	34.2 (93.6)	32.9 (91.2)	31.6 (88.9)	30.7 (87.3)	34.4 (93.9)
Mean daily minimum °C (°F)	20.4 (68.7)	21.8 (71.2)	24.2 (75.6)	26.2 (79.2)	25.8 (78.4)	25.0 (77.0)	24.5 (76.1)	24.1 (75.4)	23.8 (74.8)	23.4 (74.1)	22.3 (72.1)	20.7 (69.3)	23.5 (74.3)
Record low °C (°F)	14.4 (57.9)	13.1 (55.6)	17.4 (63.3)	19.6 (67.3)	20.7 (69.3)	18.6 (65.5)	16.8 (62.2)	21.0 (69.8)	18.2 (64.8)	18.5 (65.3)	16.4 (61.5)	14.0 (57.2)	13.1 (55.6)
Average rainfall mm (inches)	4.9 (0.19)	7.0 (0.28)	20.4 (0.80)	76.6 (3.02)	105.0 (4.13)	48.3 (1.90)	77.7 (3.06)	92.7 (3.65)	157.9 (6.22)	185.5 (7.30)	97.5 (3.84)	34.8 (1.37)	908.4 (35.76)
Average rainy days	0.5	0.5	1.1	3.4	5.9	3.5	5.2	5.4	9.0	9.3	5.4	2.3	51.7
Average relative humidity (%) (at 17:30 IST)	40	30	27	36	43	48	51	52	55	61	59	51	46
Source: India Meteorological Department

== Demographics ==
=== Population ===
Religious census
Religion	Percent(%)
Hindu	88.43%
Muslim	3.58%
Christian	7.72%
Sikh	0.01%
Buddhist	0.01%
Jain	0.0%
Other	0.25%
No religion	0.01%

According to 2011 census, Mettur had a population of 52,813 with a sex-ratio of 1,016 females for every 1,000 males, much above the national average of 929. A total of 4,286 were under the age of six, constituting 2,216 males and 2,070 females. Scheduled Castes and Scheduled Tribes accounted for 19.43% and 0.42% of the population respectively. The average literacy of the town was 76.82%, compared to the national average of 72.99%. The town had a total of 14,282 households. There were a total of 19,305 workers, comprising 78 cultivators, 304 main agricultural labourers, 316 in house hold industries, 16,194 other workers, 2,413 marginal workers, 13 marginal cultivators, 160 marginal agricultural labourers, 141 marginal workers in household industries and 2,099 other marginal workers. As per the religious census of 2011, Mettur had 88.43% Hindus, 3.58% Muslims, 7.72% Christians, 0.01% Sikhs, 0.01% Buddhists, 0.0% Jains, 0.25% following other religions and 0.01% following no religion or did not indicate any religious preference.

== Government and politics ==
The Mettur assembly constituency is part of Dharmapuri (Lok Sabha constituency).

== Economy ==
Mettur has a number of industries. An important one is chemical manufacturing: Mettur Chemicals (now known as Chemplast), (not only that there are more) has four large plants manufacturing chemicals, soaps, and industrial gases. MALCO, one of the main aluminium producers, runs a famous matriculation and higher secondary school. SISCOL (Southern Iron and Steel Company Limited, now a part of Jindal groups (JSW Steel Ltd)) is a new addition to the region though it is located at Pottaneri, 15 kilometres (9.3 mi) from Mettur and 32 kilometres (20 mi) from Salem, the district headquarters. SAIL's Salem Steel plant is nearby. High-grade granite is quarried in the Eli Karadu Hills.

Mettur is also called the "Aluminium city of Tamil Nadu". Its aluminium plant, operated by MALCO, has its own bauxite mines at Yercaud (Salem district) and Kolli Hills (Namakkal district). The company is one of five integrated primary aluminium producers in India, with an alumina refinery capacity of 55,000 tonnes per annum (tpa) and an aluminium smelter capacity of 29,500 tpa.

=== Industrial pollution ===
Mettur's industrial development has taken a heavy toll on many parts of its farming and fishing communities. However, despite protest from both international groups such as Greenpeace and local groups such as West Gonur Farmers' Association or SpeakOut Salem!, the local authorities have failed to bring the problems under control.

Recent tests undertaken by Dr. Ruth Stringer and Dr. Mark Chernaik of ELAW-US (an Oregon-based environmental laboratory) revealed high levels of contamination. From nine samples taken from around the plants run by Chemplast and MALCO, there were 17 chemicals were found to be at levels significantly above USEPA 'safe' levels.

== Culture/Cityscape ==
Villagers in Mettur celebrate the Mariamman festival during the summer vacation time (May) and lasts for an entire week.

The Aadi Perukku festival is celebrated every year on 18th day of Tamil month Adi.

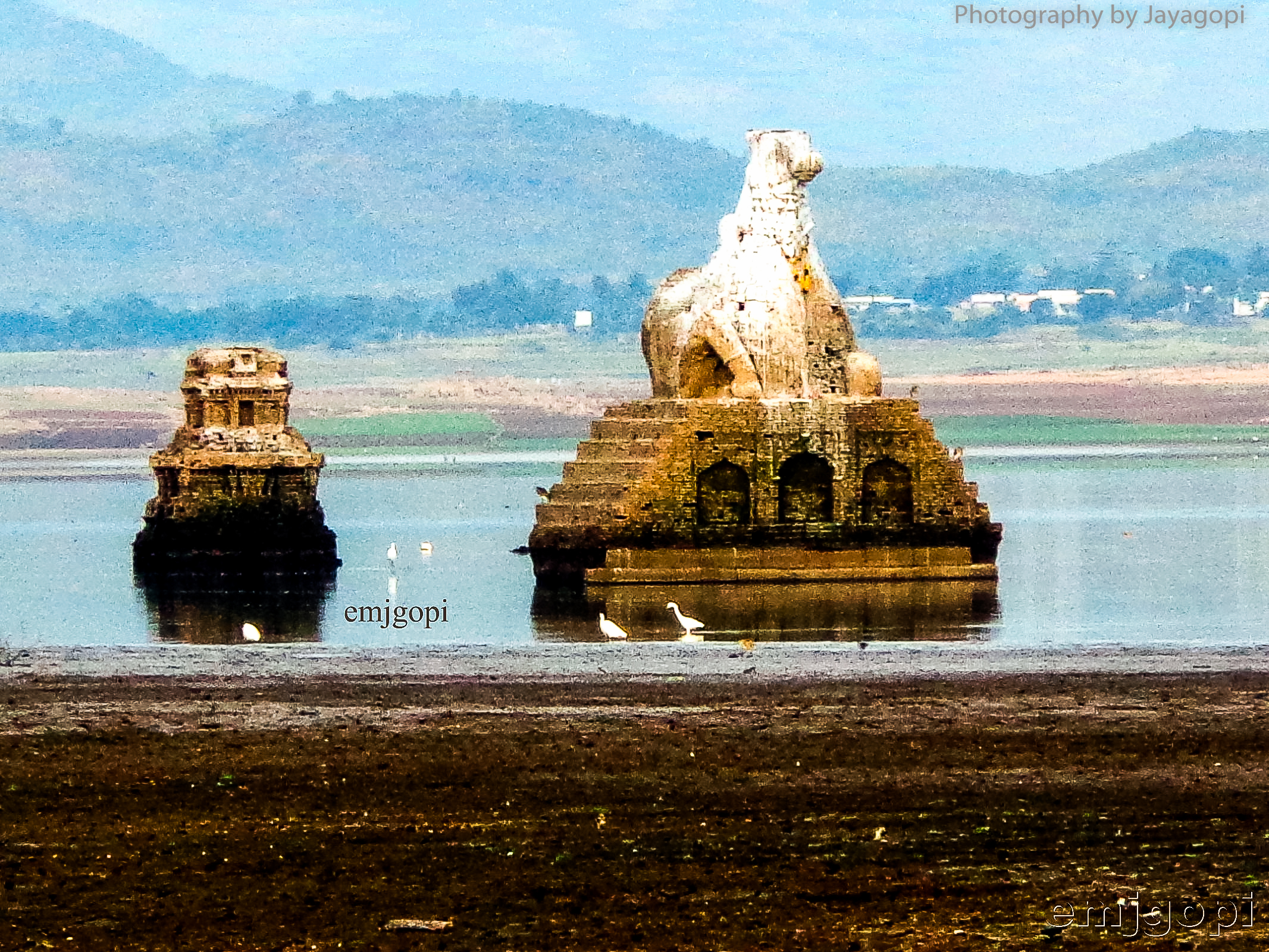
Pannavadi Nandhi statue & Jalagandeswarar temple. Located deep inside the Mettur dam.

A lullaby recorded in Mettur, Salem district

== Transport ==
=== By Air ===
The nearest airport is Salem Airport, which has daily flights to Chennai.

=== By Rail ===
There is a railway station located near the upper part of Mettur Dam that connects to Salem. From the station there is also a daily express train to and from Salem

=== By Road ===
Mettur, being close to the transportation hubs of Erode and Salem, is well connected to both these cities as well as to Dharmapuri. Bus services operate from Erode and Salem at the high frequency, with bus services typically once every 5 minutes. There is a shortcut for Coimbatore from Dharmapuri via Thoppur, Mettur, Bhavani (which can save up to 20 kilometres (12 mi) travel) without reaching Salem by NH47 due to the high volume of traffic between Coimbatore and Salem, especially between Coimbatore and Avinashi on NH47. There is also a route to Mysuru-Karnataka through Madeswaran Malai (madeswaran Betta) and Kollegal from Mettur.
