= Martalli =

Martalli Hale martalli
- Village
- Location in Karnataka, India Martalli (India)
- Coordinates: 12.15°N 77.10°E
- Country: India
- State: Karnataka
- District: Chamarajanagar
- Talukas: Hanur

Government
  - Body: Gram panchayat

Population (2001)
  - Total: 13,182

Languages
  - Official: Kannada, Telugu and Tamil
- Time zone: UTC+5:30 (IST)
- ISO 3166 code: IN-KA

Martalli is a village in the southern state of Karnataka, India. It is located in the Hanur taluk of Chamarajanagar district.

== Demographics ==
As of 2001 India census, Martalli had a population of 13182 with 6796 males and 6386 females.

== See also ==
- Chamarajanagar
- Districts of Karnataka

pin 571320
