= Cowdalli =

Cowdalli cowdalli
- village
- Location in Karnataka, India Cowdalli (India)
- Coordinates: 12.15°N 77.10°E
- Country: India
- State: Karnataka
- District: Chamarajanagar
- Talukas: Hanur

Population (2001)
  - Total: 8,433

Languages
  - Official: Kannada
- Time zone: UTC+5:30 (IST)
- Postal code: 571444
- ISO 3166 code: IN-KA

Cowdalli is a village in the southern state of Karnataka, India. It is located in the Hanur taluk of Chamarajanagar district.

== Demographics ==
As of 2001 India census, Cowdalli had a population of 8433 with 4413 males and 4020 females.

== See also ==
- Chamarajanagar
- Districts of Karnataka
