= Kaveri =

River in southern India

Kaveri Cauvery Kaviri Ponni
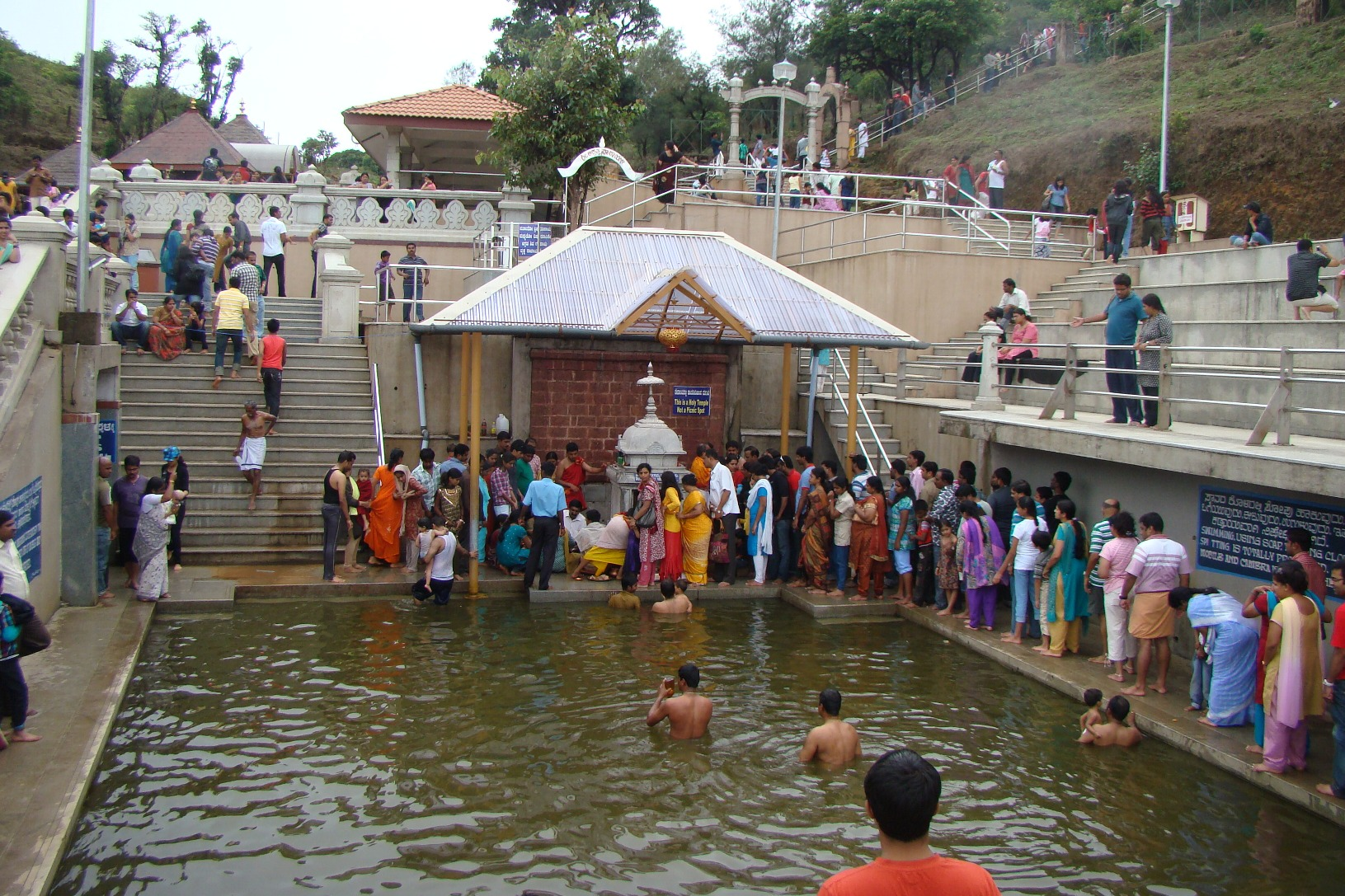
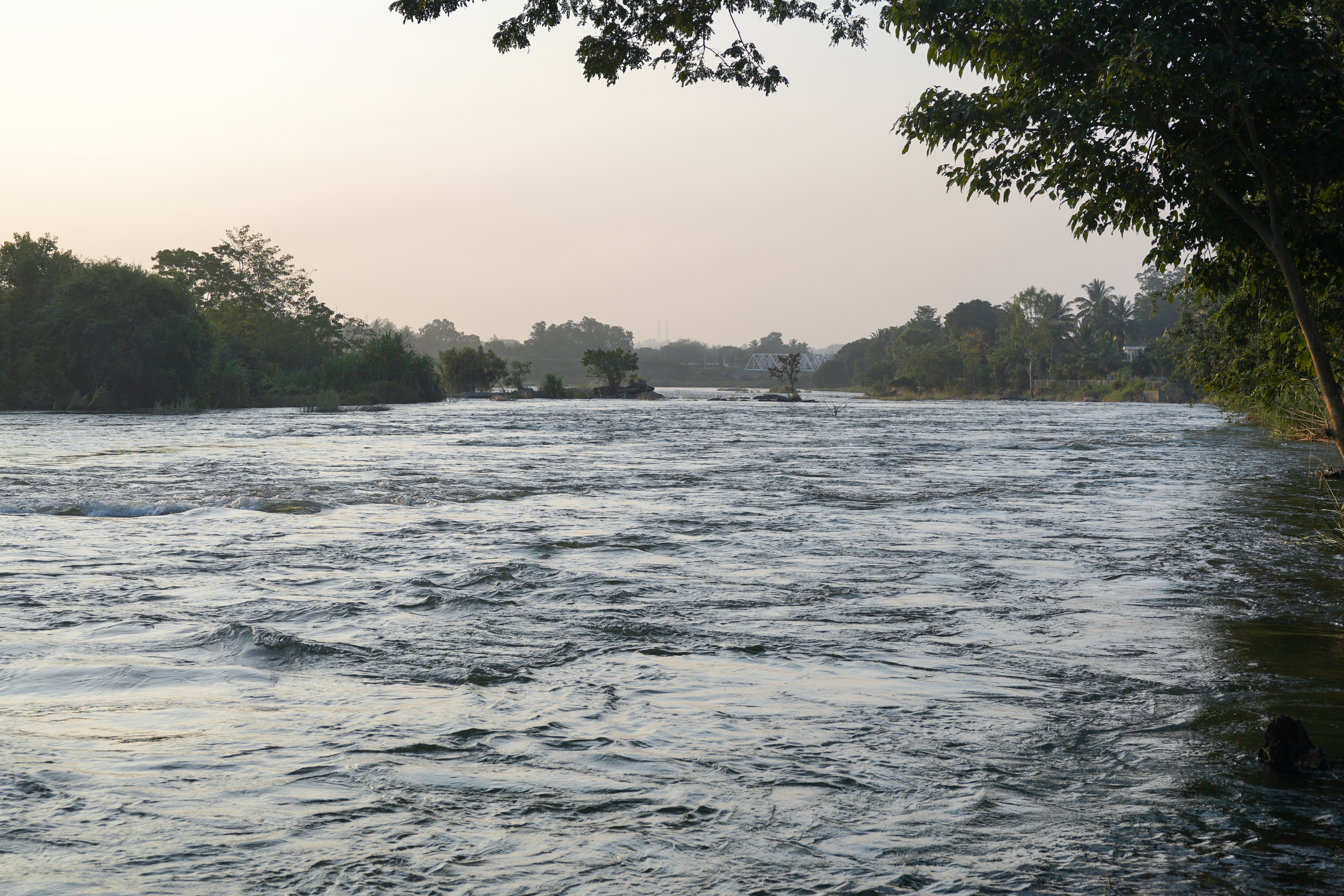
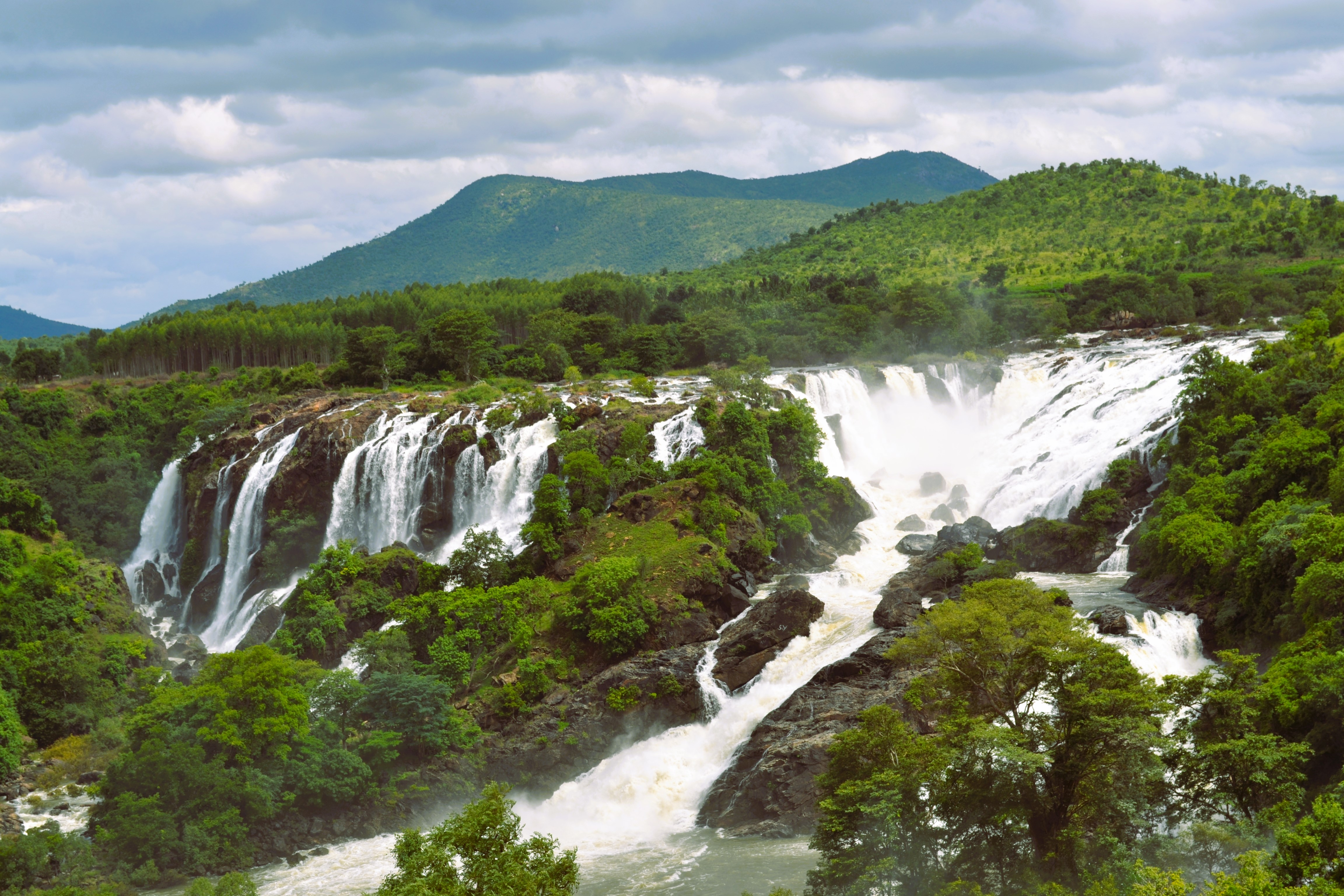
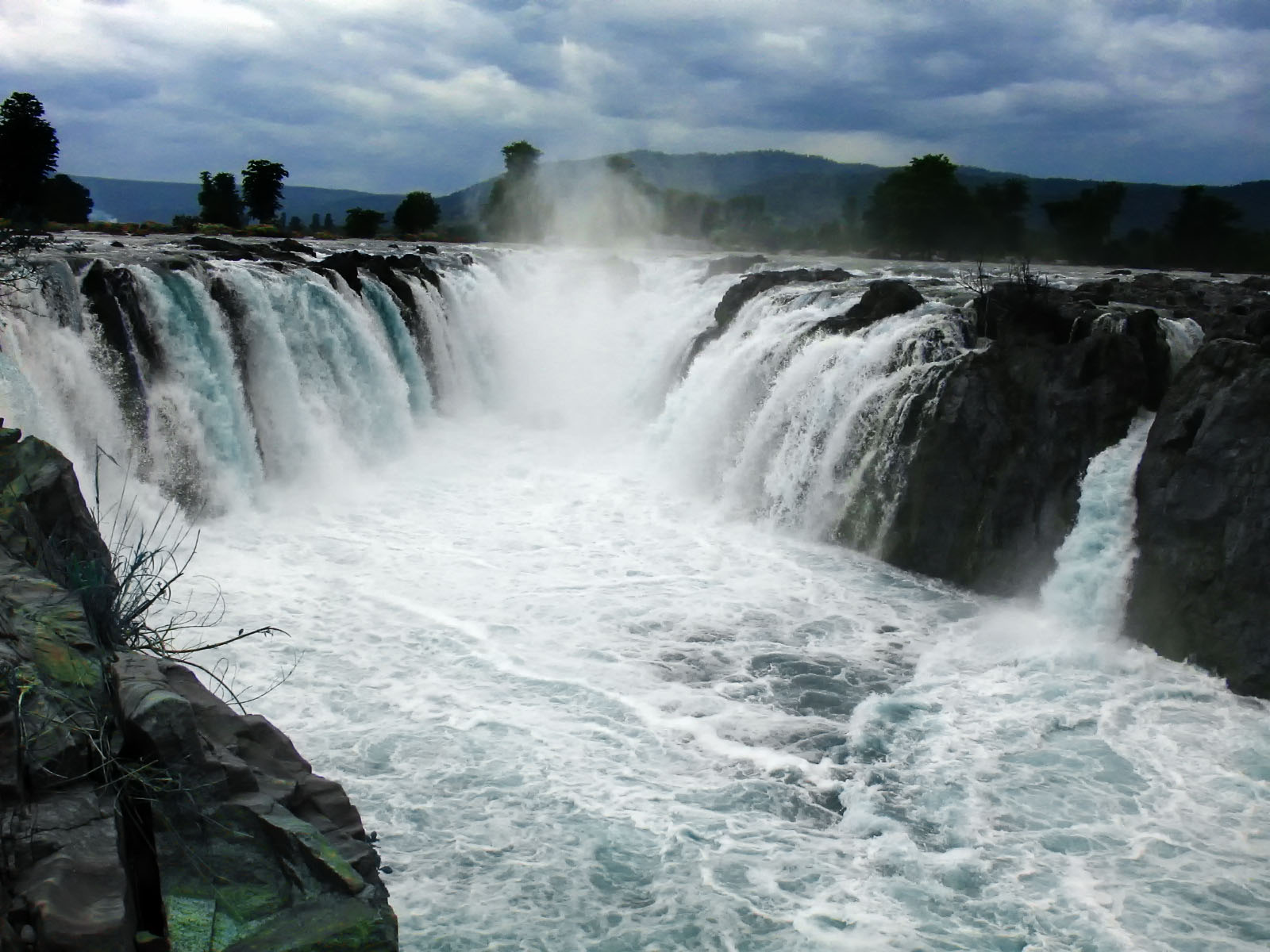
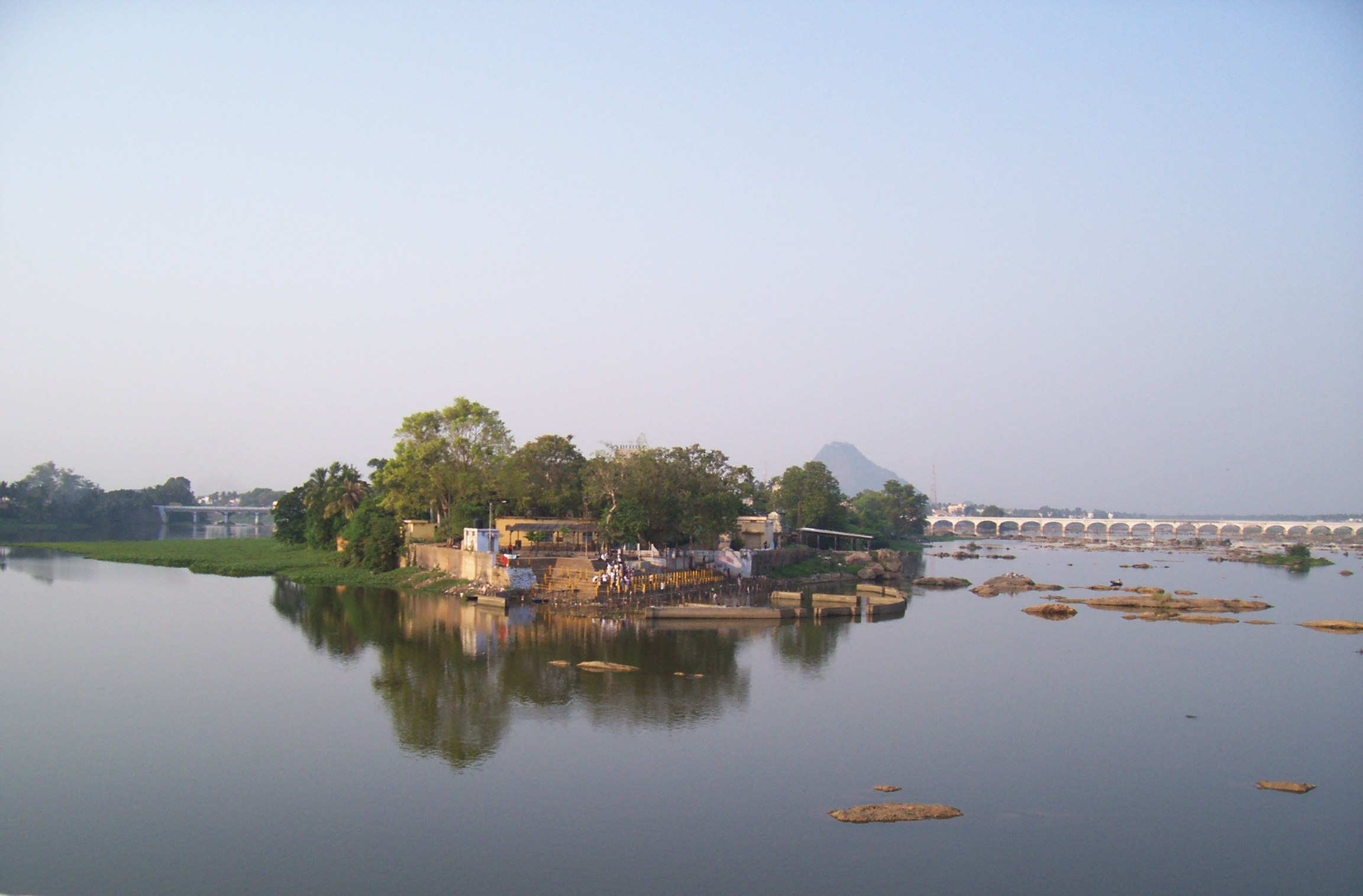
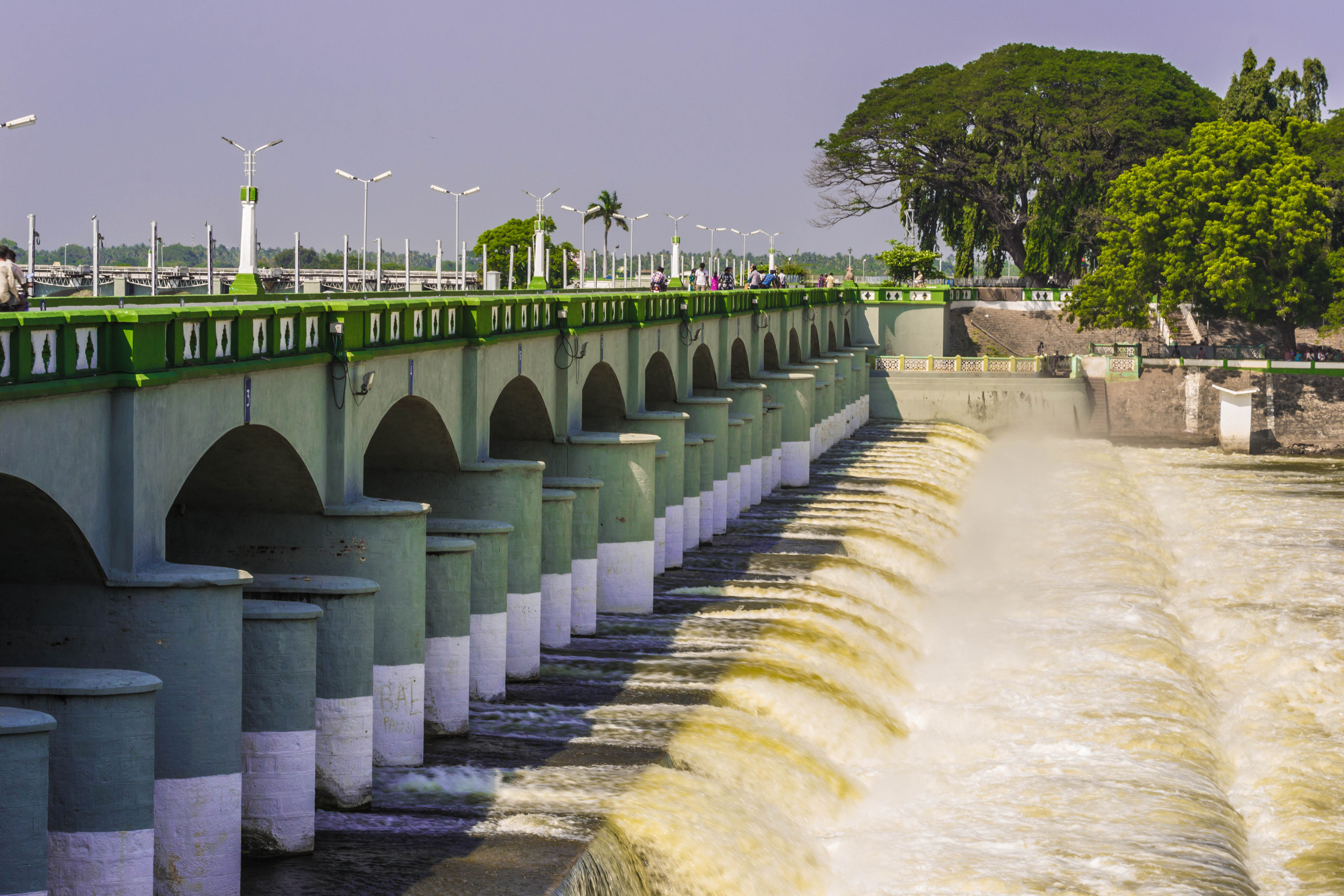
- Talakaveri, the source of Kaveri Kaveri at Srirangapatna Shivanasamudra Falls Hogenakkal Falls Confluence with Bhavani Kallanai Dam on the river

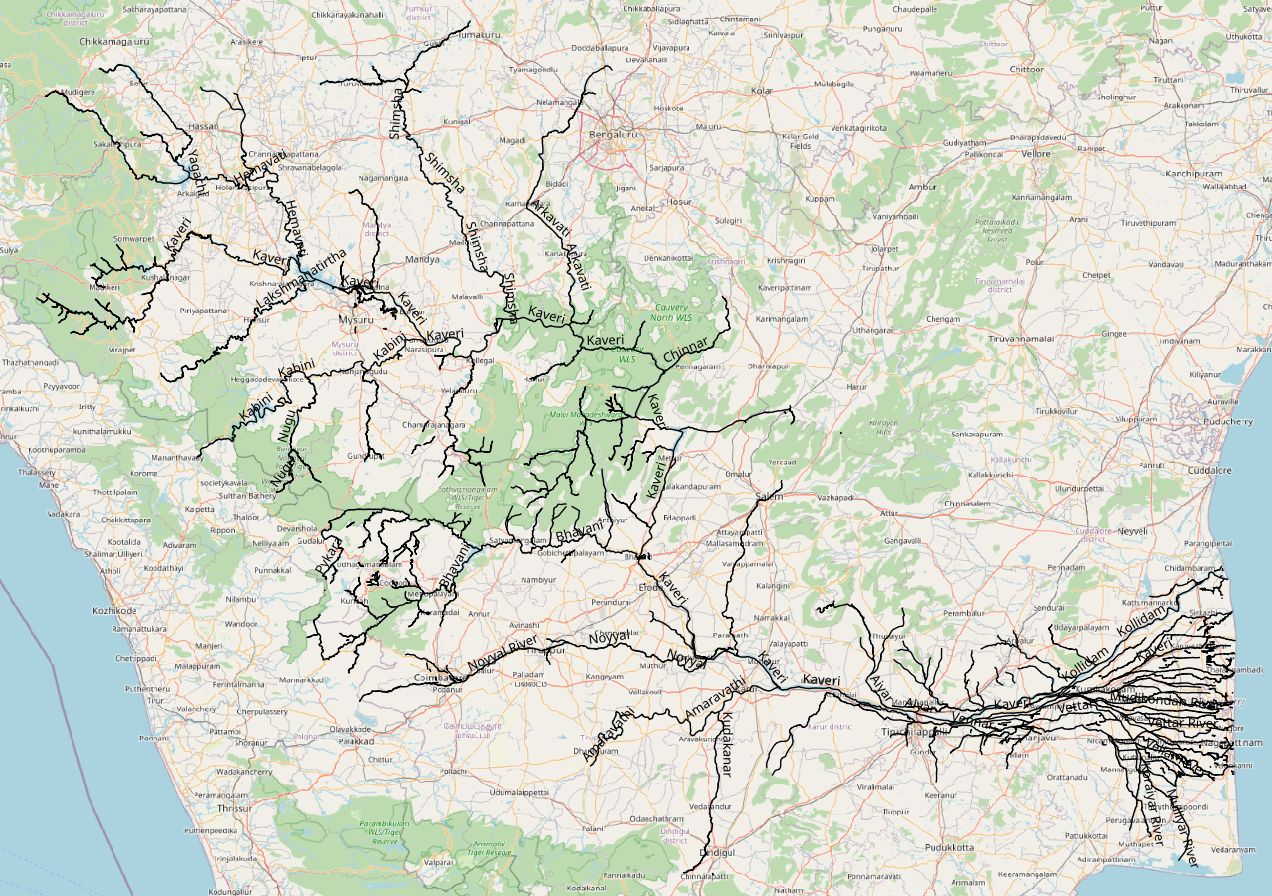
- Kaveri River basin

Location
- Country: India
- Region: South India
- States: Karnataka, Tamil Nadu, Kerala, Puducherry

Physical characteristics
- Source: Western Ghats
  - location: Talakaveri, Kodagu district, (Coorg) Karnataka
  - coordinates: 12°23′N 75°29′E
  - elevation: 1,341 m (4,400 ft)
- Mouth: Bay of Bengal
  - location: Poompuhar, Mayiladuthurai district, Tamil Nadu
  - elevation: 0 m (0 ft)
- Length: 800 km (500 mi)
- Basin size: 81,155 km^{2} (31,334 sq mi)
- Discharge
  - location: Lower Anaicut (58.5 km upstream of mouth)
  - average: 919 m^{3}/s (32,500 cu ft/s) (1998–2024)
  - minimum: 144 m^{3}/s (5,100 cu ft/s)
  - maximum: 4,075 m^{3}/s (143,900 cu ft/s)
- Discharge
  - location: Grand Anicut (140 km upstream of mouth)
  - average: 400.716 m^{3}/s (14,151.2 cu ft/s) (1976–1979); 1,131 m^{3}/s (39,900 cu ft/s) (1998–2024)
  - minimum: 78 m^{3}/s (2,800 cu ft/s)
  - maximum: 4,916 m^{3}/s (173,600 cu ft/s)

Basin features
- Tributaries
  - left: Harangi, Hemavati, Shimsha, Arkavati, Sarabanga, Thirumanimutharu
  - right: Lakshmana Tirtha, Kabini, Bhavani, Noyyal, Amaravati, Moyar

The Kaveri (anglicized as Cauvery), (Note: Tamil: Kāviri, IPA: [kaːʋɪɾi], Kannada: Kāvēri, IPA: [kaːʋeːri])) historically known in Tamil as Ponni (IPA: [ponːi]), is a major river flowing across southern India. It is the third-largest river in the peninsula after the Godavari and Krishna. The river basin covers an estimated catchment area of 81,155 km^{2} (31,334 sq mi), across the states of Tamil Nadu, Karnataka, Kerala, and the Union Territory of Puducherry.

The river rises at Talakaveri from a hill called Brahmagiri in Talakaveri Wildlife Sanctuary of the Western Ghats, at an elevation of 1,341 m (4,400 ft) in the Kodagu district of Karnataka. It traverses approximately 320 km (200 mi) across the Deccan Plateau in Karnataka before entering Tamil Nadu, flowing a further 416 km (258 mi) eastward to empty into the Bay of Bengal near Poompuhar in Mayiladuthurai district. Over its total course of roughly 800 km (500 mi), major tributaries include Harangi, Hemavati, Lakshmana Tirtha, Kabini, Shimsha, Arkavati, Bhavani, Noyyal, and Amaravati.

Multiple dams and reservoirs along the river support regional irrigation systems and hydroelectric power generation. The river has supported agriculture in the region for centuries and historically supported early agricultural states, including the Chola and Pandya kingdoms. Sharing of its waters has been a long-standing Kaveri River water dispute between Karnataka and Tamil Nadu. The Kaveri River basin is a densely populated region, with several towns and cities located on its banks.

In Hinduism, the Kaveri is revered as one of the seven sacred rivers (Sapta Sindhu) and is personified as the goddess Kaveriamma. It is praised in Sanskrit epics including the Mahabharata and various Puranas, as well as throughout classical Sangam literature.

== Etymology ==
Kaveri is mentioned in Sanskrit literature, including the Mahabharata and the Puranas, as a sacred river. The name itself might have had different etymologies. According to a legend in the Skanda Purana, the river originated when Ganesha, in the guise of a crow, overturned sage Agastya's kamandala (water vessel). Linguistically, the name Kaveri has been derived from Dravidian roots, such as the Kannada terms ಕಾವಿ (Kāvi): Red ochre, saffron, or reddish-brown clay and ಏರಿ (Ēri): A watercourse, bank, bund, or elevated stream channel. An alternative derivation links it to viri (to spread out or wide banks). The term kāviri alos occurs in the Sankethi dialect to denote a river. The spelling Cauvery is an anglicization done during the colonial period.

In classical Tamil literature, the river is frequently called Ponni (meaning "the golden one"), in reference to the gold-colored fertile silt it deposited along its delta during floods. In Sanskrit traditions, it is also known as Daksina Gaṅgā (Ganges of the South), and Ardha Gaṅgā (Half Ganga) due to its mythological association with the celestial Ganges. Some scholars also identify it with the Rigvedic river name Marudvṛdhā (rejoicing with the Maruts).

== Course ==
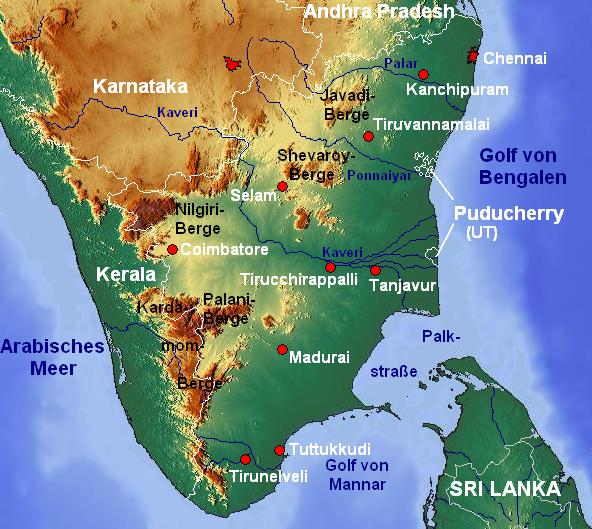
The Kaveri originates in the Western Ghats and later flows eastwards towards the Bay of Bengal

The river rises at Talakaveri in the Brahmagiri Hills of the Western Ghats, located at an elevation of 1,341 m (4,400 ft) in the Kodagu district of Karnataka. Its upper course passes through rocky terrains and steep banks before flowing eastward through a series of rapid falls. Flowing onto the Deccan Plateau through a narrow gorge, the river drops about 18–24 m (59–79 ft) at Chunchanakatte Falls. It then forms the river island of Srirangapatna and widens to 270–370 m (890–1,210 ft) before turning south-east. At Shivanasamudra, it drops 91 m (299 ft) to form the Shivanasamudra Falls, one of the largest waterfalls in the country. After forming the island of Shivanasamudra, the river converges and passes through the Mekedatu gorge. After traversing 320 km (200 mi) within Karnataka, the river forms the Karnataka–Tamil Nadu border for roughly 64 km (40 mi).

Upon entering Tamil Nadu, the river forms the Hogenakkal Falls, before continuing south toward the Mettur Dam, where it is joined on its right bank by River Bhavani at Kooduthurai. Flowing eastward through Erode and Karur, it enters Tiruchirappalli district and bifurcates into northern Kollidam and southern Kaveri. The two branches form the river island Srirangam before diverging across an extensive delta of 36 distribution channels. It ultimately discharges into the Bay of Bengal near Poompuhar in Mayiladuthurai district. The river traverses for about 416 km (258 mi) in Tamil Nadu, bringing its total length to approximately 800 km (500 mi).

=== Tributaries ===
The Kaveri River has 21 major tributaries. In Karnataka, major tributaries include the Hemavati, Lakshmana Tirtha and Kabini, with the former two joining at Krishna Raja Sagara reservoir. The Shimsha and Arkavati enter before the river reaches Tamil Nadu, where it receives Bhavani at Kooduthurai, followed downstream by Noyyal, Amaravati, Sarabanga, and Thirumanimutharu.

=== Discharge ===
Discharge
Year	Grand Anicut			Lower Anicut		
Year	(m^{3}/s)			(m^{3}/s)		
Year	Min	Mean	Max	Min	Mean	Max
1998	170	1,099	3,454	161	885	2,540
1999	289	1,131	3,778	285	864	2,845
2000	343	1,287	4,903	233	1,011	3,335
2001	258	1,080	3,348	309	948	3,115
2002	139	772	2,392	144	867	2,423
2003	78	667	2,297	216	646	2,100
2004	103	895	3,303	217	839	3,160
2005	179	1,012	3,354	240	991	3,873
2006	268	1,072	2,495	473	1,091	3,187
2007	118	993	3,308	324	1,126	4,075
2008	132	1,094	3,677	398	1,103	3,167
2009	227	1,040	3,238	290	965	3,301
2010	373	1,080	3,141	411	1,022	3,626
2011	171	1,163	3,815	296	928	3,014
2012	190	874	3,342	177	711	2,149
2013	82	1,043	3,281	229	856	3,127
2014	279	1,148	3,663	409	980	2,533
2015	559	1,422	3,816	407	913	2,177
2016	490	1,129	2,890	276	728	1,733
2017	216	931	3,586	154	671	1,832
2018	341	1,571	4,439	266	934	3,427
2019	331	1,473	4,559	173	966	3,070
2020	591	1,590	4,373	209	983	2,944
2021	478	1,502	3,935	257	988	3,136
2022	548	1,713	4,916	407	1,172	3,385
Overall	78	1,151	4,916	144	928	4,075

== Geology and ecology ==
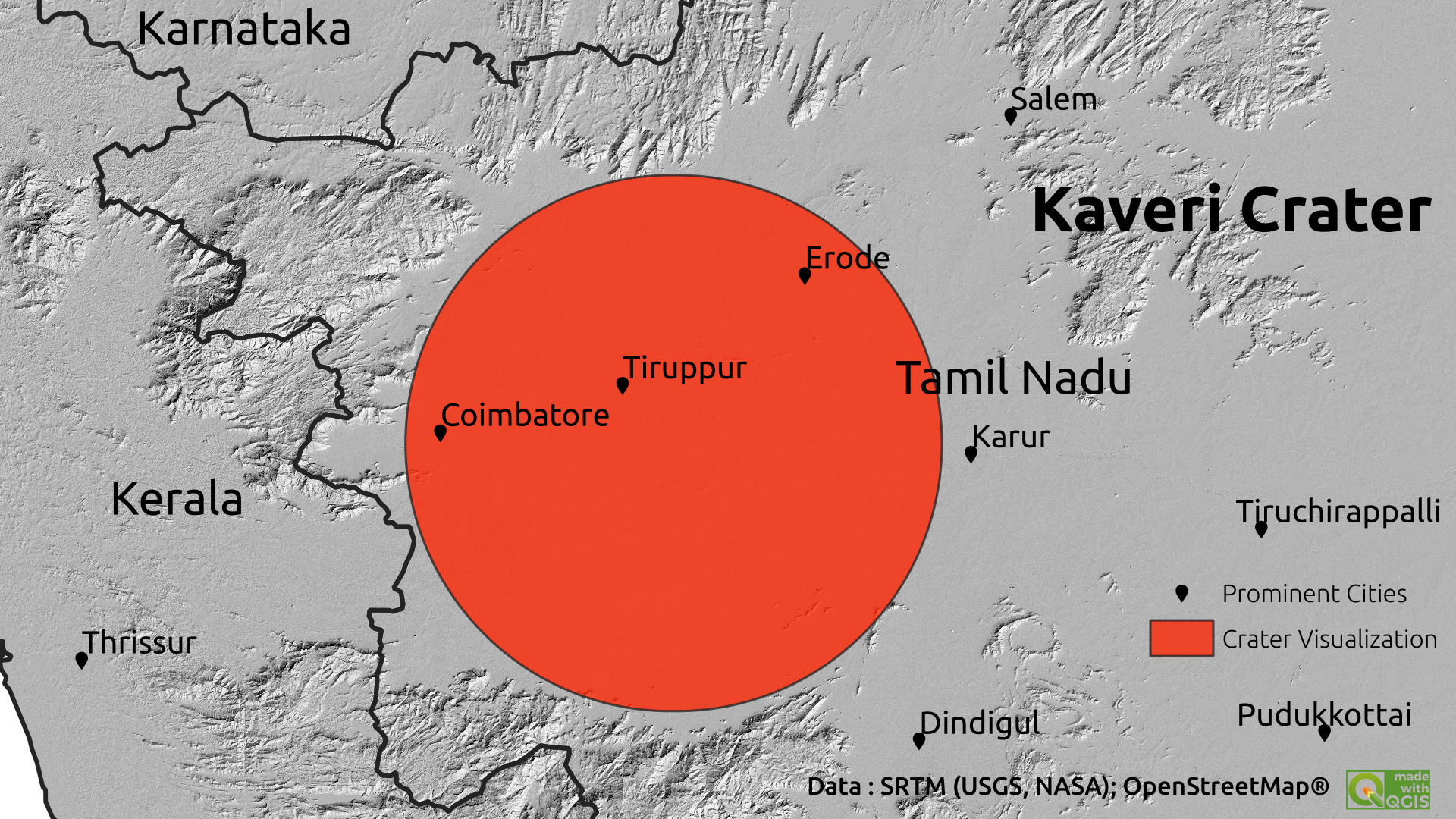
The location of the supposed impact structure (red circle) surrounded by hills within the Deccan peninsula

The Kaveri basin was formed between the Late Jurassic and Early Cretaceous periods during the breakup of Gondwana and the opening of the Indian Ocean. Most of the basin is underlain by Precambrian metamorphic and igneous basement rocks. Closepet Granite is found in the upper catchment, while charnockite rocks are found in the central basin. A 2017 study proposed that presence of putative meteorite impact structure in the vicinity of the basin. The basin's topography prevents rapid run-off, reducing the frequency of flash floods. The river maintains perennial flow supported by dual monsoon cycles: the southwest monsoon in Karnataka and the northeast monsoon in Tamil Nadu.

According to a 2014–15 government assessment, the basin generates nearly 3.5 million metric tons of dissolved salts annually, with an average salinity of 441 ppm, close to the standard maximum limit of 500 ppm. Increased population density and agricultural runoff have increased salt inputs, while salt export is hindered by reduced fresh water discharge to the sea. This degrades basin water quality.

The basin encompasses forest and agro–ecological zones, with forest types ranging from moist evergreen and dry deciduous forests to grasslands. A remote-sensing study found that approximately 12,850 km^{2} (4,960 sq mi) of natural vegetation was lost in the basin between 1965 and 2016. Regional flora includes species such as Terminalia arjuna, Tamarindus indica, Pongamia pinnata, Salix tetrasperma, Ficus benghalensis, Ficus religiosa, Eucalyptus torticornis, and Diospyros montana.

The basin contains several protected areas that support populations of Bengal tiger, Indian elephant, gaur, leopard, sloth bear, Nilgiri tahr and grizzled giant squirrel apart from various species of deer, wild boar and reptiles. Avifauna includes the painted stork (Mycteria leucocephala), spot-billed pelican (Pelecanus philippensis), and black-headed ibis (Threskiornis melanocephalus). Aquatic wildlife includes the mugger crocodile (Crocodylus palustris), smooth-coated otter (Lutrogale perspicillata), and the critically endangered hump-backed mahseer (Tor remadevii).

Dams and flow regulation structures have fragmented the longitudinal and lateral connectivity of the river, disrupting aquatic habitats and migratory fish routes. The reduction of sediment, nutrient, and freshwater delivery has impacted estuarine ecosystem in the delta. Reduced stream flows and suppressed natural flow pulses have caused steep declines in migratory fish populations. Seasonal low-flow conditions threaten the survival of the endemic and endangered hump-backed mahseer.

== Riparian zone ==
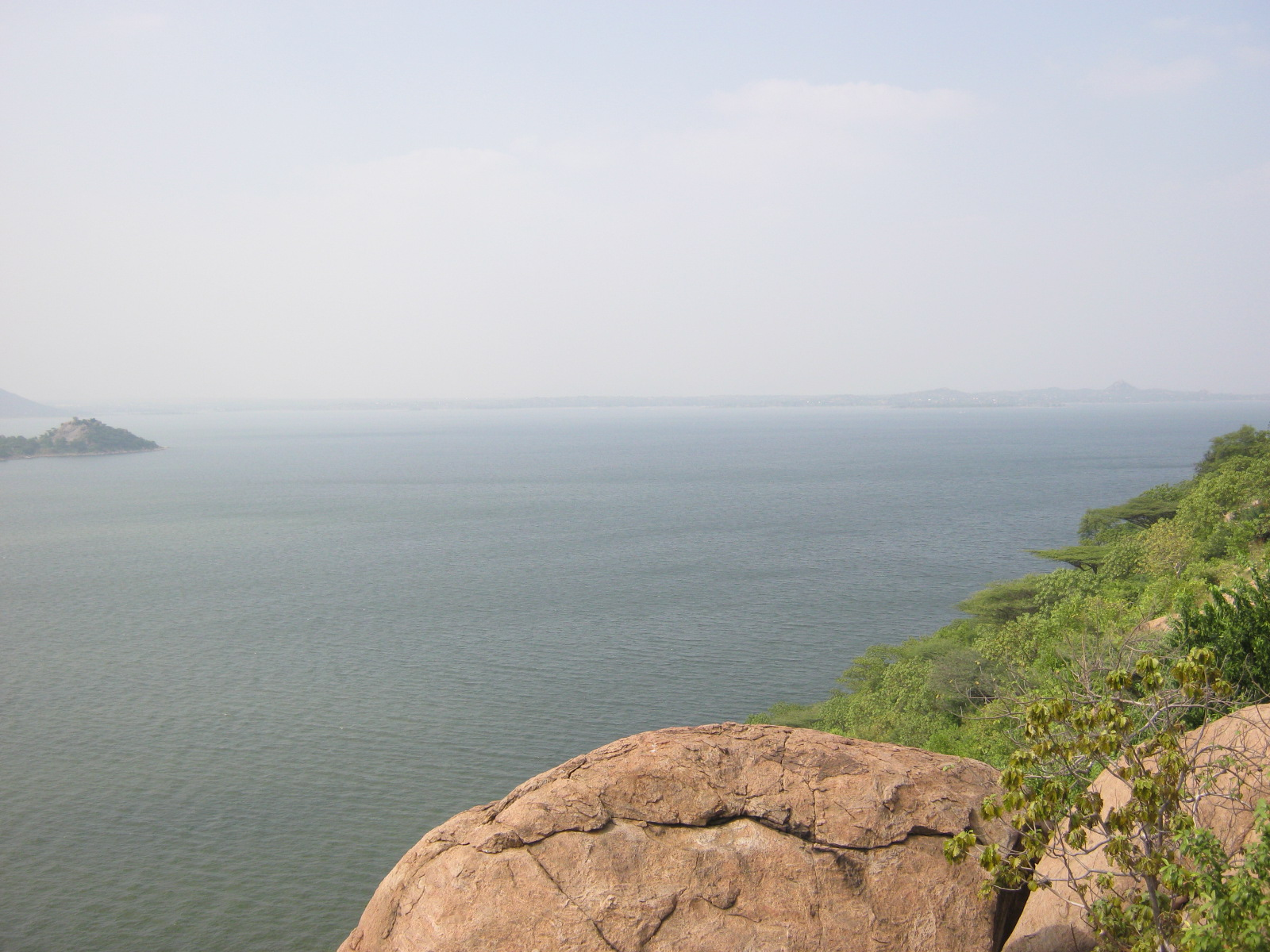
Stanley Reservoir formed by Mettur Dam, one of the largest dams on the river

The Kaveri basin covers a total catchment area of 81,155 km^{2} (31,334 sq mi), comprising 43,856 km^{2} (16,933 sq mi) in Tamil Nadu, 34,273 km^{2} (13,233 sq mi) in Karnataka, 2,866 km^{2} (1,107 sq mi) in Kerala, and 160 km^{2} (62 sq mi) in the Union Territory of Puducherry. Over half of the basin is arable land, with rice and sugarcane being the primary crops. During the first Five-Year Plan, the total flow of the river was estimated at 15 cubic kilometres (12,000,000 acre⋅ft), of which approximately 60% was utilized for irrigation. The river also provides drinking water and supports hydroelectric power generation.

== Dams ==
About 96 dams have been built across the Kaveri basin over the past millennium, most of which are small-scale barrages and weirs. Irrigation is the primary function for 70.30% of these structures, followed by hydroelectric power generation (19.80%), combined irrigation and power (6.93%), and municipal drinking water supply (2.97%).

The ancient Grand Anicut (Kallanai) was constructed during the early Chola period in the 2nd century CE. Modern infrastructure began with the Shivanasamudra hydroelectric installation in 1902, one of the earliest major hydroelectric plants in Asia. In Tamil Nadu, the Mettur Dam was completed in 1934 forming the Stanley Reservoir with a gross storage capacity of 93.4 tmc ft (2.64 km^{3}). In Karnataka, the Krishna Raja Sagara dam, completed in 1938, is the second-largest reservoir on the river with a capacity of 49.5 tmc ft (1.40 km^{3}). Principal tributary storage projects include the Bhavanisagar Dam (32.8 tmc ft) on the Bhavani River in Tamil Nadu, as well as the Gorur dam (37.1 tmc ft) on the Hemavathi, the Kabini Dam (18.5 tmc ft) on the Kabini, and the Harangi Dam (9.5 tmc ft) on the Harangi in Karnataka. Although these rivers expanded the basin's irrigation coverage, water retention has aggravated political disputes over water sharing between upstream and downstream states.

=== Hydrological alterations ===
Hydrological modelling shows that reservoir operations have altered Kaveri's natural flow across all major sub-basins. Monsoon storage has caused year-round decline in monthly median flows and suppressed seasonal peak floods. Moreover, irrigation storage has extended downstream low-flow periods, while hydroelectric power projects such as Kabini produce fluctuations in flow due to short-term peak releases.

=== Historical agreements and interim award ===
Kaveri basin

The dispute over sharing the Kaveri waters began in 1807, when the Madras Presidency objected to the iirigation proposals by the Kingdom of Mysore. After initial discussions failed, the British authorities mediated a six-rule agreement known as the General Agreement of 1892. This agreement was revised in 1924 for a fifty-year term. Following its expiration in 1974, Karnataka sought a new allocation framework citing extended irrigation needs, while Tamil Nadu favored an extension of the agreement. Under article 262 of the Constitution of India, the central government is empowered to adjudicate interstate water disputes. Following a Supreme Court directive, the Union Government constituted the Cauvery Water Disputes Tribunal (CWDT) on 2 June 1990. On 25 June 1991, the ribunal issued an interim award directing Karnataka to release 205 tmc ft (5.80 km^{3}) of water annually to Tamil Nadu, according to a prescribed monthly schedule. In the order passed on 25 June 1991, the CWDT directed Karnataka to release 205 tmcft of water per year to Tamil Nadu based on a specific schedule. Tamil Nadu was directed to release 6 tmc ft (0.17 km^{3}) of water to Puducherry.

=== Implementation framework and CRA ===
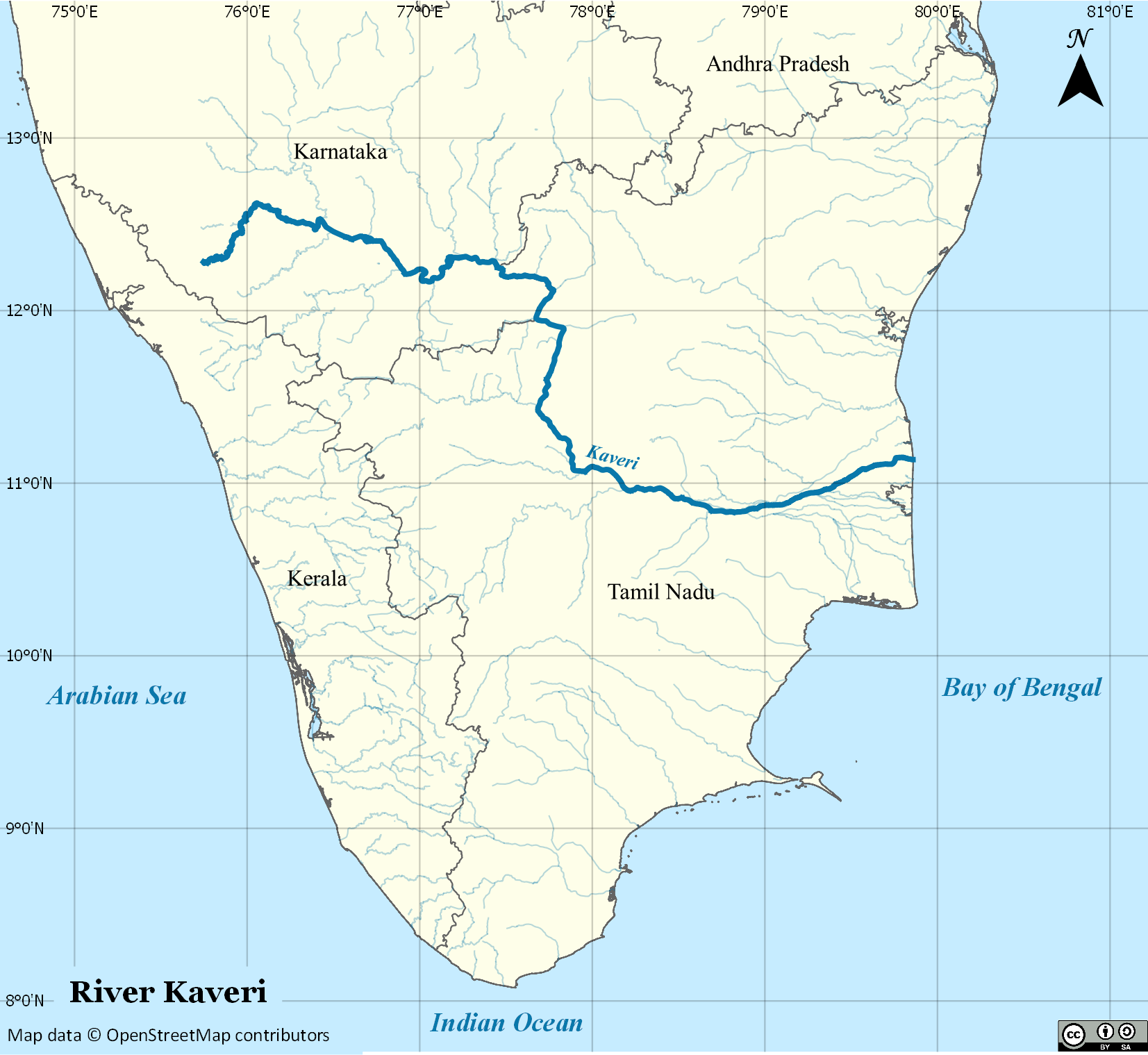
The Kaveri originates in Karnataka and later flows through Tamil Nadu

In July 1991, the President of India sought an advisory from the Supreme Court on the tribunal's interim order; the court upheld the award, and the central government gazetted it on 1 December 1991. IN 1998, under the Inter-State River Water Disputes Act, 1956, the central government notified the Cauvery River Authority (CRA) and the Cauvery Monitoring Committee (CMC) to implement the interim award. The CRA was chaired by the Prime Minister and included the Chief Ministers of the riparian states as members.

=== Final tribunal award ===
Seasonal deficits during weak monsoon—especially in 1995 and 2002—triggered regional protests, litigation and central government interventions. On 5 February 2007, the CWDT issued its final award. It determined the total basin yield at 740 tmc ft (20.95 km^{3}). The tribunal allocated 419 tmc ft (11.86 km^{3}) to Tamil Nadu, 270 tmc ft (7.65 km^{3}) to Karnataka, 30 tmc ft (0.85 km^{3}) to Kerala, and 7 tmc ft (0.20 km^{3}) to Puducherry. The tribunal also established a monthly schedule for water releases from Karnataka to Tamil Nadu.

=== Supreme Court ruling and CWMA ===
The central government finally notified the CWDT final award on 20 February 2013 after further petitions. On 16 February 2018, the Supreme Court of India delivered its judgement on appeals filed by the riparian states, modifying the allocation. Karnataka received 284.75 tmc ft (8.06 km^{3}), Tamil Nadu received 404.25 tmc ft (11.45 km^{3}), Kerala retained 30 tmc ft (0.85 km^{3}) and Puducherry retained 7 tmc ft (0.20 km^{3}). 14 tmc ft was reserved for environmental flows and inevitable discharge into the sea. In compliance with the Supreme Court's order, the central government constituted the Cauvery Water Management Authority (CWMA) and the Cauvery Water Regulation Committee (CMRC) in June 2018 to monitor water releases.

== Religious significance ==
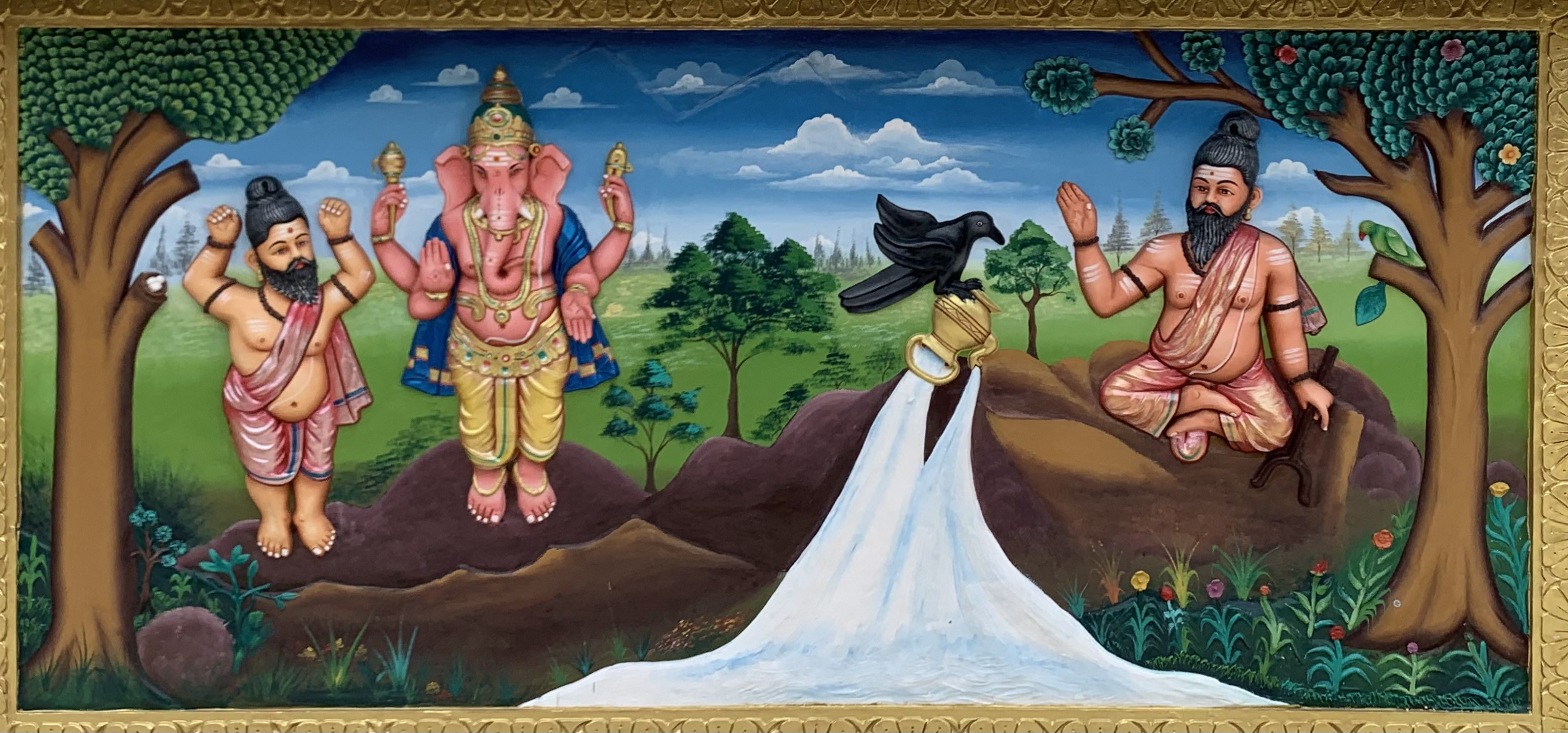
Art depiction of Kaveri flowing from Agastya's kamandala, aided by Ganesha, from a Kovil in Johor Bahru, Malaysia

In Hinduism, the Kaveri is revered as one of seven sacred rivers (Sapta Sindhu) of India, personified and worshiped as the goddess Kaveri Amma. She appears in classical Sanskrit texts, including the Mahabharata and the various Puranas as both a sacred river and a goddess. According to Shiva Purana, the Kaveri is one of the seven holy Gangas and ritual bathing in its waters is believed to grant one's desires. The Varaha Purana describes it as originating from five mountains and that it grants longevity to those who drink from it. In the Skanda Purana, Shiva places the Kaveri into the Kamandala (water vessel) of sage Agastya, which is overturned by Ganesha to release the river.

Another tradition equates Kaveri with Lopamudra, the wife of Agastya. She—having taken the form of water—is being carried by Agastya in his Kamandala. Ganesha, in the form of a crow, knocks the water pot down. This spilled water becomes the river that quells the draught in south India. Another traditional story narrates that following the Samudra Manthana (churning of the Ocean of Milk), Mohini and Lopamudra retrieved the nectar of immortality for the gods. Lopamudra was then raised by Brahma and was later given to king Kavera, who named her Kaveri. She prayed to Brahma to become a purifying river.

In classical Tamil epic Manimekalai, Agastya swallowed the Ganges when the floodwaters disturbed his tapas (penance), later releasing it in southern India as Kaveri. Cilapathikaram mentions Kaveri as the daughter of Kavera. In Sri Lankan historical records of Theravada Buddhism, the name Kaveri is mentioned as one of the twenty canals linked to 12th-century Parakrama Samudra reservoir (built under Parakramabahu I in Polonnaruwa.

Kaveri Pushkaram is a Hindu festival observed once every 12 years along the river, with a "Maha Pushkaram" occurring every 144 years. The key pilgrimage sites include Srirangam and Thula Kattam ghats at Mayiladuthurai. Celebrated for 12 days, the festival features Vedic chanting, Yajnas, homam (fire rituals), ancestral offerings (tarpanam), and devotional music and dance performances.

== Environmental issues ==
The Kaveri River is subject to pollution from untreated domestic sewage, industrial effluents, and wastewater (agrochemical) runoffs from coffee plantations. Studies have identified elevated concentrations of heavy metals—including lead, copper and mercury—in riverbed sediments, along with hormone-disrupting compounds linked to reproductive issues, carcinogenic risks in both aquatic life and humans. In response, regulatory bodies including the Karnataka State Pollution Control Board have set up water-quality monitoring stations, issued directives to municipal authorities to prevent untreated effluent discharges, and promote waste segregation at source.

== See also ==
- List of rivers of India
- Kaveri Pushkaram
- Thejaswini River
