= Stanley Reservoir =

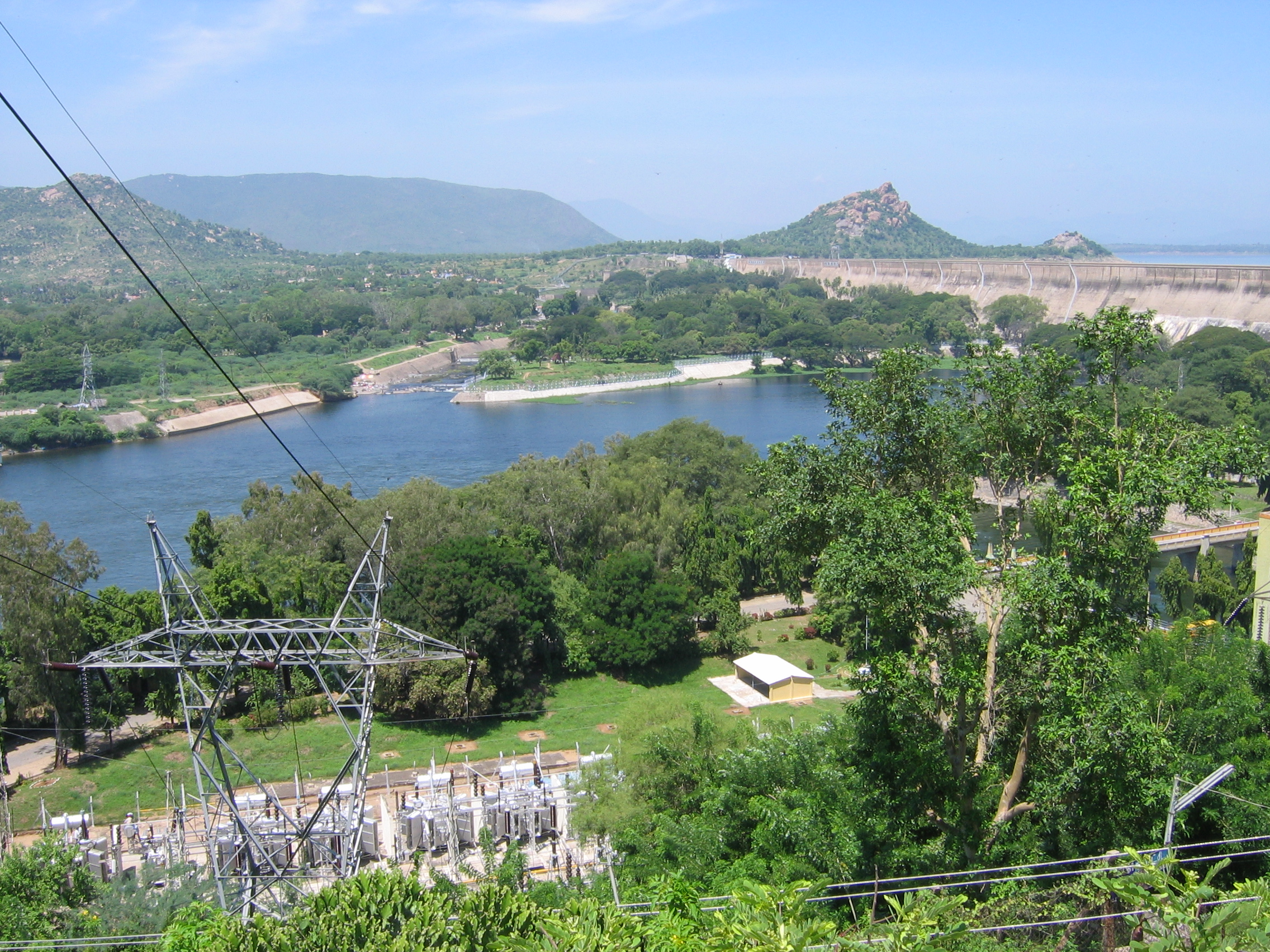

- Location within Tamil Nadu
- Location: South India
- Coordinates: 11°54′N 77°50′E
- Type: reservoir
- Primary inflows: River Kaveri minor tributaries: Palar, Chennar and Thoppar above Stanley Reservoir
- Basin countries: India

Stanley Reservoir (formed behind Mettur Dam) located in Salem District of Tamil Nadu is one of largest fishing reservoirs in South India. It was completed in 1934 and was named after Lieutenant Colonel Sir George Frederick Stanley GCSI GCIE CMG, who served as the Governor of Madras from 1929 to 1934. Its main source of water is the River Kaveri (Cauvery). Three minor tributaries – Palar, Chennar and Thoppar – join the Kaveri above Stanley Reservoir. The water is retained by the Mettur Dam, Tamil Nadu.

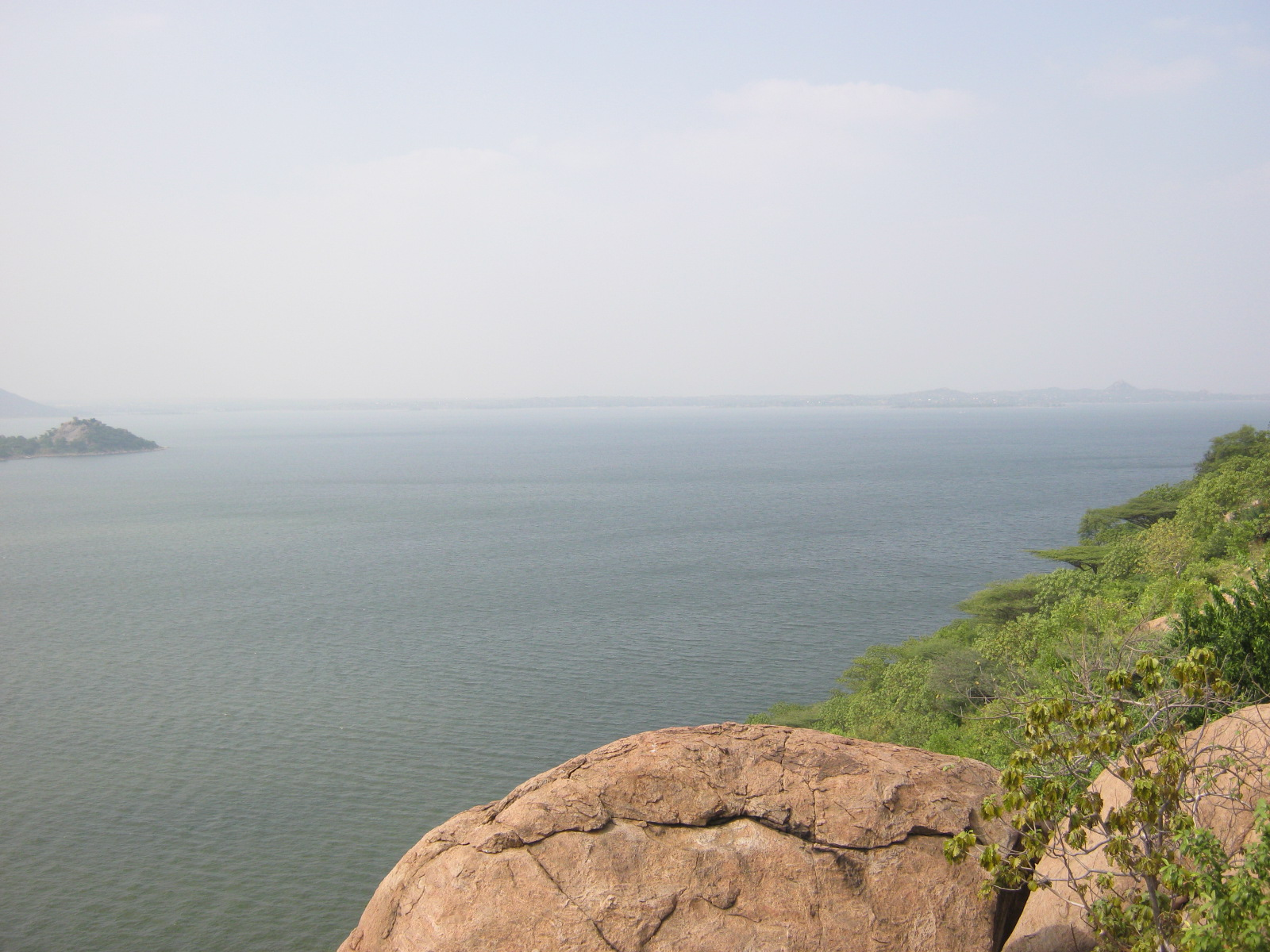
Water catchment area of Stanley reservoir

The Stanley Reservoir is one of the largest of its kind in India with a total capacity of (93.47 Tmcft).(2,146,071 acre ft). The creation of the reservoir caused the submersion of two villages, all of whose inhabitants were relocated to Mettur.

The total length of the dam is 1700 meters. The Mettur Hydro Electric power project is also quite large. The dam, the park, the major hydroelectric power stations and hills on all sides make Mettur a tourist attraction.
