= List of nagar panchayats in Tamil Nadu =

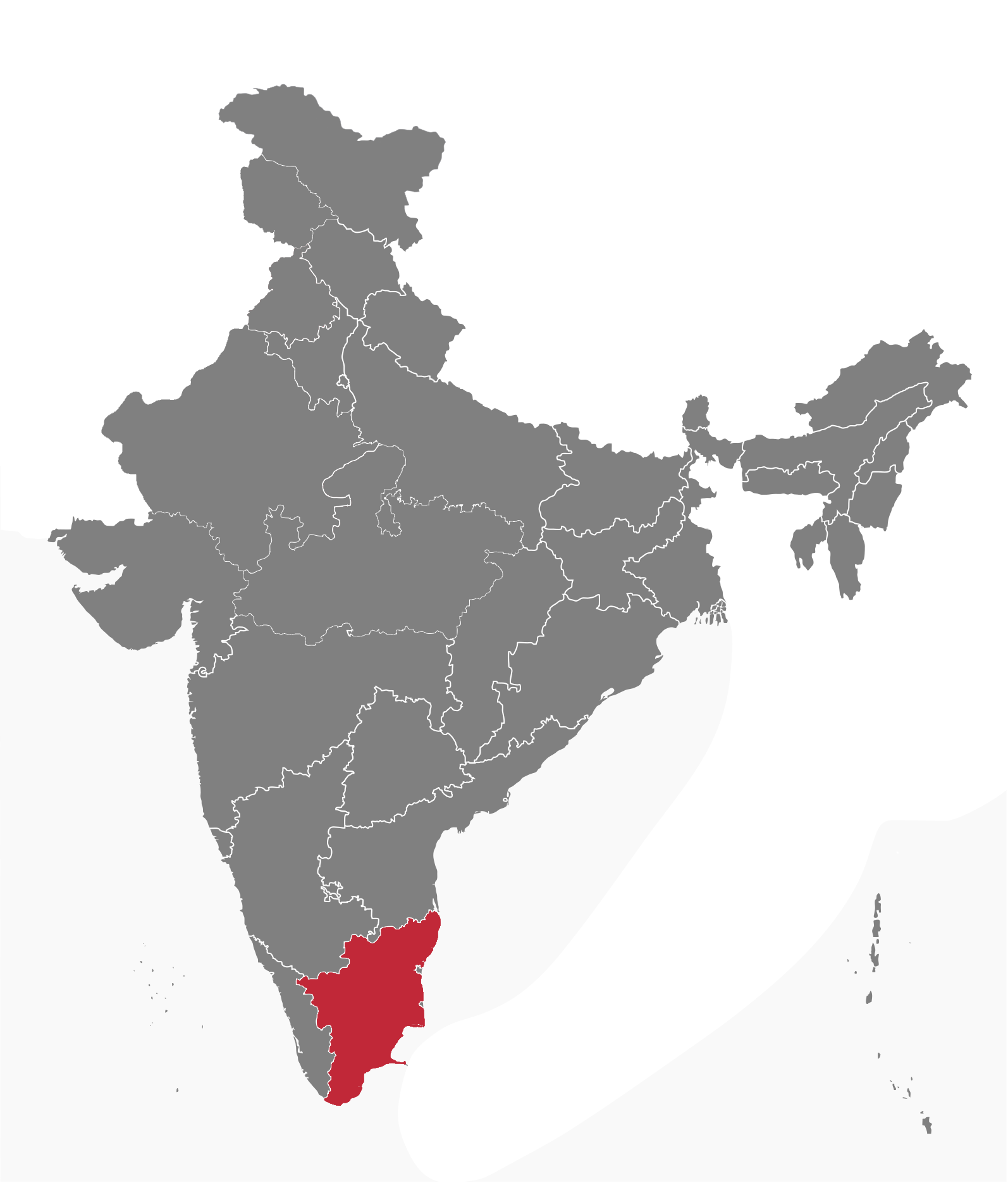
Location of Tamil Nadu in India

Nagar Panchayat (Tamil: Perooratchi) is an urban administrative body in the local administration in Tamil Nadu. It incorporates areas which are in transition form rural to urban, and are categorised below the municipalities. Tamil Nadu was the first state to introduce such a classification in urban local bodies. As of 2025, the state has 489 town panchayats.

== Thiruvallur district ==
1. Arani
2. Athipattu (including North Ennore)
3. Gummidipoondi
4. Kadambathur
5. Minjur
6. Padianallur
7. Pallipattu
8. Podaturpet
9. Thirumazhisai
10. Uthukottai

== Chengalpattu district ==
1. Acharapakkam
2. Edaikazhinadu
3. Karunguzhi
4. Mamallapuram
5. Thiruporur
6. Tirukalukundram

== Kanchipuram district ==
1. Uthiramerur
2. Walajabad

== Vellore district ==
1. Odugathur
2. Pallikonda
3. Pennathur
4. Thiruvalam

== Ranipet district ==
1. Ammoor
2. Kalavai
3. Kaveripakkam
4. Nemili
5. Panapakkam
6. Thakkolam
7. Timiri
8. Vilapakkam

== Thiruppathur district ==
1. Alangayam
2. Natrampalli
3. Uthayendram

== Thiruvannamalai district ==
1. Chetpet
2. Desur
3. Kalambur
4. Kannamangalam
5. Kizh-Pennathur
6. Peranamallur
7. Pudupalayam
8. Vettavalam
9. Vanapuram
10. Thyagi Annamalai Nagar
11. Thandarampattu
12. Vembakkam
13. Kalasapakkam
14. Adamangalam-Pudur

== Dharmapuri district ==
1. Kadathur
2. Kariamangalam
3. Palakkodu
4. Papparapatti
5. Pappireddipatti
6. Pennagaram
7. Marandahalli
8. Kambainallur
9. Bommidi
10. Koothapadi

== Krishnagiri district ==
1. Bagalur
2. Bargur
3. Denkanikottai
4. Kaveripattinam
5. Kelamangalam
6. Nagojanahalli
7. Rayakottai
8. Shoolagiri
9. Uthangarai

== Salem district ==
1. Arasiramani
2. Attayampatti
3. Ayothiapattinam
4. Belur
5. Elampillai
6. Ethapur
7. Gangavalli
8. Jalakandapuram
9. Kadayampatti
10. Kannankurichi
11. Karuppur
12. Keeripatti
13. Kolathur
14. Konganapuram
15. Mallur
16. Mecheri
17. Nangavalli
18. Omalur
19. P. N. Patti
20. Panaimarathupatti
21. Pethanaickenpalayam
22. Poolampatti
23. Sentharapatti
24. Thammampatti
25. Thedavur
26. Thevur
27. Vazhapadi
28. Vanavasi
29. Veeraganur
30. Veerakkalpudur

== Namakkal district ==
1. Alampalayam
2. Athanur
3. Erumaipatti
4. Kalappanaickenpatti
5. Mallasamudram
6. Namagiripettai
7. Padaiveedu
8. Pandamangalam
9. Paramathi
10. R.Pattanam
11. Pillanallur
12. Pothanur
13. R. Pudupatti
14. Seerapalli
15. Sendamangalam
16. Velur
17. Venkarai
18. Vennanthur

== Erode district ==
1. Ammapettai
2. Anthiyur
3. Appakudal
4. Appakudal
5. Ariyappampalayam
6. Athani
7. Avalpoondurai
8. Bhavanisagar
9. Chennasamudram
10. Chennimalai
11. Chithode
12. Elathur
13. Jambai
14. Kanjikoil
15. Karumandi Chellipalayam
16. Kasipalayam-Gobi
17. Kembainaickenpalayam
18. Kilampadi
19. Kodumudi
20. Kolappalur
21. Kollankoil
22. Kuhalur
23. Lakkampatti
24. Modakurichi
25. Nallampatti
26. Nambiyur
27. Nasiyanur
28. Nerunjipettai
29. Olagadam
30. P. Mettupalayam
31. Pallapalayam
32. Pasur
33. Periyakodiveri
34. Pethampalayam
35. Sivagiri
36. Unjalur
37. Vadugapatti
38. Vaniputhur
39. Vellottamparappu
40. Vengampudur

== Tiruppur district ==
1. Chinnakkampalayam
2. Dhali
3. Kaniyur
4. Kannivadi
5. Kolathupalayam
6. Komaralingam
7. Kunnathur
8. Madathukulam
9. Mulanur
10. Muthur
11. Rudravathi
12. Samalapuram
13. Sankaramanallur
14. Uthukuli

== Coimbatore district ==
1. Alandurai
2. Anaimalai
3. Annur
4. Chettipalayam
5. Dhaliyur
6. Ettimadai
7. Idikarai
8. Irugur
9. Kannampalayam
10. Kinathukadavu
11. Kottur-Malayandipattinam
12. Mopperipalayam
13. Narasimhanaickenpalayam
14. Veerapandi
15. Odaiyakulam
16. Othakalmandapam
17. Pallapalayam
18. Periyanaickenpalayam
19. Periya Negamam
20. Perur
21. Pooluvapatti
22. Samathur
23. Sarcarsamakulam
24. Sirumugai
25. Suleeswaranpatti
26. Thenkarai
27. Thirumalayampalayam
28. Thondamuthur
29. Vedapatti
30. Vellalore
31. Vettaikaranpudur
32. Zamin Uthukuli

== Nilgiris district ==
1. Adikaratti
2. Bikketti
3. Devarshola
4. Huligal
5. Jagathala
6. Ketti
7. Kilkunda
8. Naduvattam
9. O' Valley
10. Sholur

== Cuddalore district ==
1. Annamalai Nagar
2. Bhuvanagiri
3. Gangaikondan
4. Kattumannarkoil
5. Killai
6. Kurinjipadi
7. Lalpet
8. Mangalampet
9. Melpattampakkam
10. Parangipettai
11. Pennadam
12. Sethiathoppu
13. Srimushnam
14. Thorapadi

== Villupuram district ==
1. Ananthapuram
2. Arakandanallur
3. Gingee
4. Marakkanam
5. Thiruvennainallur
6. Valavanur
7. Vikravandi

== Kallakurichi district ==
1. Chinnasalem
2. Manalurpet
3. Sankarapuram
4. Thiagadurgam
5. Vadakkanandal

== Thanjavur district ==
1. Maruthuvakudi
2. Ammapettai
3. Ayyampettai
4. Madukkur
5. Melathiruppanthuruthi
6. Melattur
7. Orathanad
8. Papanasam
9. Peravurani
10. Perumagalur
11. Cholapuram
12. Swamimalai
13. Thirubuvanam
14. Thirukattupalli
15. Thirunageswaram
16. Thiruppanandal
17. Thiruvaiyaru
18. Thiruvidaimarudur
19. Vallam
20. Veppathur

== Mayiladuthurai district ==
1. Kuthalam
2. Manalmedu
3. Tharangambadi
4. Vaitheeswarankoil

== Nagapattinam district ==
1. Kilvelur
2. Thalainayar
3. Thittacheri
4. Velankanni

== Tiruvarur district ==
1. Kudavasal
2. Koradacheri
3. Muthupet
4. Nannilam
5. Needamangalam
6. Peralam
7. Valangaiman

== Tiruchirappalli district ==
1. Balakrishnampatti
2. Kallakudi
3. Kattuputhur
4. Koothappar
5. Manachanallur
6. Mettupalayam
7. Ponnampatti
8. Poovalur
9. Pullambadi
10. South Kannanur
11. Sirugamani
12. Thathaiyangarpet
13. Thottiyam
14. Uppiliapuram

== Perambalur district ==
1. Arumbavur
2. Kurumbalur
3. Labbaikudikadu
4. Poolambadi

== Ariyalur district ==
1. Udayarpalayam
2. Varadarajanpettai

== Pudukkottai district ==
1. Alangudi
2. Annavasal
3. Arimalam
4. Iluppur
5. Karambakkudi
6. Keeramangalam
7. Keeranur
8. Viralimalai
9. Thirumayam
10. Gandarvakottai

== Dindigul district ==
1. Agaram
2. Ammainaickanur
3. Ayakudi
4. Ayyalur
5. Ayyampalayam
6. Balasamudram
7. Chinnalapatti
8. Eriyodu
9. Kannivadi
10. Keeranur
11. Natham
12. Neikkarapatti
13. Nilakkottai
14. Palayam
15. Pannaikadu
16. Pattiveeranpatti
17. Sevugampatti
18. Sithayankottai
19. Sriramapuram
20. Thadikombu
21. Vadamadurai
22. Batlagundu
23. Vedasandur

== Karur district ==
1. Aravakurichi
2. Krishnarayapuram
3. Marudur
4. Nangavaram
5. P. J. Cholapuram
6. Puliyur, Karur
7. Punjai Thottakurichi
8. Uppidamangalam

== Madurai district ==
1. Vellalapatti
2. Alanganallur
3. Elumalai
4. Palamedu
5. Peraiyur
6. Sholavandan
7. T. Kallupatti
8. Vadipatti

== Virudhunagar district ==
1. Chettiarpatti
2. Kariapatti
3. Mallankinaru
4. Mamsapuram
5. South Kodikulam
6. Seithur
7. Sundarapandiam
8. W. Pudupatti
9. Watrap

== Theni district ==
1. Andipatti
2. B. Meenakshipuram
3. Boothipuram
4. Devadanapatti
5. Ganguvarpatti
6. Hanumanthampatti
7. Highwavys
8. Kamayagoundanpatti
9. Kombai
10. Kuchanur
11. Markayankottai
12. Melachokkanathapuram
13. Odaipatti
14. Palani Chettipatti
15. Pannaipuram
16. C. Pudupatti
17. Thamaraikulam
18. Thenkarai
19. Thevaram
20. Uthamapalayam
21. Vadugapatti
22. Veerapandi

== Sivaganga district ==
1. Ilaiyangudi
2. Kanadukathan
3. Kandanur
4. Kottaiyur
5. Nattarasankottai
6. Kalaiyarkovil
7. Nerkuppai
8. Pallathur
9. Puduvayal
10. Singampunari
11. Thirupuvanam
12. Tiruppattur

== Ramanathapuram district ==
1. Abiramam
2. Kamuthi
3. Mandapam
4. Mudukulathur
5. R. S. Mangalam
6. Sayalgudi
7. Thondi
8. Devipattinam
9. Ervadi

== Tirunelveli district ==
1. Cheranmadevi
2. Eruvadi
3. Gopalasamudram
4. Kallidaikurichi
5. Manimutharu
6. Melacheval
7. Moolakaraipatti
8. Mukkudal
9. Nanguneri
10. Naranammalpuram
11. Panagudi
12. Pattamadai
13. Sankarnagar
14. Thirukkurungudi
15. Thisayanvilai
16. Vadakkuvalliyur
17. Veeravanallur

== Tenkasi district ==
1. Achampudur
2. Alangulam
3. Alwarkurichi
4. Aygudi
5. Courtallam
6. Ilanji
7. Keezhapavur
8. Melagaram
9. Panpoli
10. Pudur
11. Rayagiri
12. Sambavarvadakarai
13. Sivagiri
14. Sundarapandiapuram
15. Thiruvenkadam
16. Vadakarai Keezhpadugai
17. Vasudevanallur

== Thoothukudi district ==
1. Alwarthirunagiri
2. Arumuganeri
3. Athur
4. Eral
5. Ettayapuram
6. Kadambur
7. Kalugumalai
8. Kanam, Tamil Nadu
9. Kayatharu
10. Nazareth
11. Perungulam
12. V. Pudur
13. Sathankulam
14. Sawyerpuram
15. Tiruvaikuntam
16. Thenthiruperai
17. Udangudi
18. Vilathikulam

== Kanyakumari district ==
1. Agastheeswaram
2. Anjugramam
3. Aralvaimozhi
4. Arumanai
5. Attoor
6. Azhagappapuram
7. Azhagiapandiapuram
8. Boothapandi
9. Edaikodu
10. Eraniel
11. Ganapathipuram
12. Kadayal
13. Kaliyakkavilai
14. Kallukuttam
15. Kappiyarai
16. Karungal
17. Kilkulam
18. Killiyur
19. Kothinallur
20. Kottaram
21. Kulasekaram
22. Kumarapuram
23. Manavalakurichi
24. Mandaikadu
25. Marungoor
26. Mulagumudu
27. Myladi
28. Nallur
29. Neiyyur
30. Pacode
31. Palapallam
32. Pazhugal
33. Ponmanai
34. Puthalam
35. Pudukadai
36. Reethapuram
37. Suchindram
38. Thalakudi
39. Thenthamaraikulam
40. Theroor
41. Thingalnagar
42. Thirparappu
43. Thiruvattar
44. Thiruvithamcode
45. Unnamalaikadai
46. Valvaithankoshtam
47. Vellimalai
48. Verkilambi
49. Vilavur
50. Villukuri

== See also ==
- List of municipal corporations in Tamil Nadu
- List of municipalities in Tamil Nadu
