= Nanguneri =

- Suburb
- Nanguneri, Tamil Nadu
- Coordinates: 8.495833°N 77.646389°E
- Country: India
- State: Tamil Nadu
- District: Tirunelveli
- Elevation: 124 m (407 ft)

Population (2001)
  - Total: 6,764

Languages
  - Official: Tamil
- Time zone: UTC+5:30 (IST)

Nanguneri is a panchayat town in Tirunelveli district in the Indian state of Tamil Nadu.

Nanguneri is a Taluk Headquarters in the District of Tirunelveli situated at a distance of 18 miles (29 km) from the headquarters of the District. Vanamamalai Perumal temple located here, is a Vaishnavite Shrine also known as Arulmigu Sree Vanamamalai Totatri Perumal Temple or more commonly known as Totadri Mutt.

== Geography ==
Nanguneri is located at 8.48°N 77.67°E. It has an average elevation of 141 meters (462 feet).

== Demographics ==
As of 2001 India census, Nanguneri had a population of 6,764. Males constitute 49% of the population and females 51%. Nanguneri has an average literacy rate of 76%, higher than the national average of 59.5%: male literacy is 83%, and female literacy is 70%. In Nanguneri, 10% of the population is under 6 years of age.

== Politics ==
Nanguneri assembly constituency is a part of Nanguneri Assembly constituency and Tirunelveli (Lok Sabha constituency).

== Landmarks ==
Vanamamalai Perumal temple located here, is a Vaishnavite Shrine also known as Arulmigu Sree Vanamamalai Totatri Perumal Temple or more commonly known as Totadri Mutt. This temple is administered by the Vanamamalai jeeyar Mutt. The annual festivals are held in the months of Pankuni and Chittirai.

== Nanguneri SEZ ==
Joint Venture agreement between TIDCO and AMR and its Associates signed on 10 April 2008 in the presence of the Hon'ble Chief Minister of Tamil Nadu.

Approval given by Government of India in July 2008.

SEZ Notified by Ministry of Commerce & Industry, vide Notification Ref. S.O.2690 (E) dated 18.11.2008.

Dr Karunanidhi said the Special Economic Zone (SEZ) at Nanguneri in Tirunelveli district would produce television sets for the first stage of distribution of colour television sets, which forms a major election promise of the DMK, would begin in September this year. http://news.webindia123.com/news/Articles/India/20060605/354742.html

The government of Tamil Nadu has announced that setting up of a pharma park at the Special Economic Zone at Nanguneri in Tirunelveli responding to the long-standing demand of the pharma industry in the state. A 250-acre (1 km^{2}) pharma park will be set up within the Nanguneri Special Economic Zone in Tirunelveli, Health Minister K.K.S.S.R. Ramachandran announced in the Assembly on Thursday.

Between 40 and 50 large and small pharmaceutical manufacturers and eight to 10 allied institutions would set up shop in the Nanguneri SEZ, providing 2,800 direct jobs and 6,000 indirect jobs. It was estimated that drugs worth over ₹500 crore would be manufactured.

The minimum area of land required for establishing an SEZ – 10 km^{2} – has been achieved.

The work on the ₹14,000-crore project may take off soon.

Disclosing this to reporters here on Wednesday, the collector, G. Prakash, said that representatives of Advanced Technology Manufacturing and Assembly City (ATMAC), formed by the California-based INFAC Management Corporation for executing the project, would meet him next week. As per the state government's plan, the SEZ should have light manufacturing, design and assembly facilities, modern infrastructure facilities and amenities to attract workforce from across the globe. The industries to be established would include electronic and telecommunication components, electronic and consumer durables, light and precision engineering, information technology, biotechnology, pharmaceuticals etc.

Jurong International, Singapore, has submitted its conceptual master plan, according to which the industrial sector would include ready built factories, custom built factories, units of multi-national corporations, science, business and hi-tech or information technology parks.

In the utility sector, there would be water and sewage treatment plants, power plants, telecommunication centres etc., along with roads of international standards. The state government has planned to earmark ₹700 crore for creating infrastructure facilities.

Windmill spare parts units to come up at Nanguneri. (http://www.nanguneri.com/webpages/Default.asp)

== Transport ==
Nanguneri is situated between Tirunelveli and Nagercoil on NH-44 (old NH-7). Also, state highways like SH-89 (Nanguneri to Uvari via - Parappadi, Mannarpuram Junction, Thisayanvilai) and SH-92 (Nanguneri to Vijayapathi via - Eruvadi, Valliyur, Radhapuram) originate from this town. Other than these highways, there are other 2 roads which connect Nanguneri with Kalakkad and Moolakaraipatti.

There is a bus stand in Nanguneri. Due to its location near National Highways-44, frequent buses are available to Nagercoil and Tirunelveli from here. Also, buses to Kalakkad, Thisayanvilai, Valliyur, Radhapuram, Ervadi, etc...

Nanguneri Railway Station

There is also a railway station in Nanguneri, which is situated in Tirunelveli - Nagercoil railway line. The station has 2 platforms. Trains like Guruvayur Express, Ananthapuri Express, Nagercoil - Mumbai CSMT Express, Madurai - Punalur Express, Kanyakumari - Rameshwaram Express, and other passenger trains halt in this station.

Nearest airports to Nanguneri are Thiruvananthapuram International airport (120 km) and Thoothukkudi Domestic airport (76 km).
