= Venkarai =

Coordinates: 11°06′04″N 77°57′39″E

Venkarai Vengarai
- Town Panchayat
- Interactive map of Venkarai
- Country: India
- State: Tamil Nadu
- District: Namakkal

Area
  - Total: 6.5 km^{2} (2.5 sq mi)

Population (2011)
  - Total: 9,330
  - Density: 1,400/km^{2} (3,700/sq mi)

Languages
  - Official: Tamil
- Time zone: UTC+5:30 (IST)
- Postal code: 637208

Venkarai is a panchayat town of Paramathi-Velur taluk, Namakkal district in the Indian state of Tamil Nadu. It is located about 32 km (20 mi) south of Namakkal along the road connecting Paramathi-Velur and Jedarpalayam. Spread across an area of 6.5 km^{2} (2.5 sq mi), the town panchayat is divided into 15 wards. It had a population of 9,330 as per the 2011 census.

== Geography and administration ==
Venkarai is a town panchayat in Rasipuram taluk of Namakkal district in the Indian state of Tamil Nadu. The town panchayat covers an area of 6.5 km^{2} (2.5 sq mi) and is divided into 15 wards and 46 streets. The Vengarai block consists of three villages–Pandamangalam, Agrahara Vengarai, and Sarkar Vengarai.

The panchayat is headed by a chairman and 15 councilors representing each of the wards. The administration is headed by an executive officer and is responsible for providing basic services including maintenance of roads, water supply, health and sanitation. Venkarai forms part of the Paramathi-Velur Assembly constituency of the Tamil Nadu Legislative Assembly and the Namakkal Lok Sabha constituency.

== Demographics and economy ==
According to the 2011 census, Venkarai had a population of 9,330 across 2,702 households. The population consisted of 4,565 males and 4,765 females. About 676 (7.3%) of the population were children aged less than six years. The town panchayat had a literacy rate of approximately 73.4%, with male literacy at 84.5% and female literacy at 62.8%. Scheduled Castes accounted for approximately 8% of the population.

As per the 2011 census, Hinduism was the predominant religion, practiced by 99.8% of the population, followed by Christianity (0.14%) and Islam (0.03%). The town panchayat has nine Hindu temples. Annual temple festivals dedicated to Mariamman are celebrated in May and October.

The town panchayat contains red and clay soils. The fertile soils support agriculture, which is the major occupation. The working population constituted approximately 58.1% of the total population, comprising 5,422 workers, of whom 2,985 were males and 2,437 were females. Of the total working population, 96.6% were engaged in main work, while 3.4% were engaged in marginal work. The main source of water supply to the town panchayat is the Kaveri river.

== Transport ==
Venkarai is located about 32 km (20 mi) south of Namakkal along the road connecting Paramathi-Velur and Jedarpalayam. The nearest railway station is Pugalur located approximately 16 km (9.9 mi) away and the nearest airport is the Tiruchirappalli International Airport.
