= Mettunasuvanpalayam =

- Census town
- Interactive map of Mettunasuvanpalayam
- Coordinates: 11°25′57″N 77°39′57″E
- Country: India
- State: Tamil Nadu
- District: Erode

Area
  - Total: 3.89 km^{2} (1.50 sq mi)

Population (2011)
  - Total: 17,240
  - Density: 4,430/km^{2} (11,500/sq mi)

Languages
  - Official: Tamil
- Time zone: UTC+5:30 (IST)
- Vehicle registration: TN-86 (Erode West)

Mettunasuvanpalayam is a census town in Bhavani taluk of Erode district in the Indian state of Tamil Nadu. It is located in the north-western part of the state. Spread across an area of 3.89 km^{2} (1.50 sq mi), it had a population of 17,240 individuals as per the 2011 census.

== Geography and administration ==
Mettunasuvanpalayam is located in Bhavani taluk, Gobichettipalayam division of Erode district in the Indian state of Tamil Nadu. Spread across an area of 3.89 km^{2} (1.50 sq mi), It is located in the north-western part of the state. The locality forms part of the Bhavani Assembly constituency that elects its member to the Tamil Nadu legislative assembly and the Tiruppur Lok Sabha constituency that elects its member to the Parliament of India. In 2016, Erode Municipal Corporation council declared a resolution to merge Mettunasuvanpalayam with the Erode Corporation.

== Demographics ==
As per the 2011 census, Mettunasuvanpalayam had a population of 17,240 individuals across 5,009 households. The population saw a significant increase compared to the previous census in 2001 when 14,278 inhabitants were registered. The population consisted of 8,638 males and 8,602 females. About 1,754 individuals were below the age of six years. The entire population is classified as urban. The town has an average literacy rate of 77.1%. About 11.1% of the population belonged to scheduled castes.

About 44% of the eligible population were employed, of which 12.6% were involved in agriculture and allied activities. Hinduism was the majority religion which was followed by 94.1% of the population, with Islam (2.9%) and Christianity (3.0%) being minor religions.
