= Olagadam =

- Panchayat town
- Location in Tamil Nadu, India
- Coordinates: 11°34′33″N 77°38′55″E
- Country: India
- State: Tamil Nadu
- District: Erode

Area
  - Total: 5.56 km^{2} (2.15 sq mi)

Population (2011)
  - Total: 9,958
  - Density: 1,790/km^{2} (4,640/sq mi)

Languages
  - Official: Tamil
- Time zone: UTC+5:30 (IST)

Olagadam is a panchayat town in Bhavani taluk of Erode district in the Indian state of Tamil Nadu. It is located in the north-western part of the state. Spread across an area of 5.56 km^{2} (2.15 sq mi), it had a population of 9,958 individuals as per the 2011 census.

== History ==
Olagadam was historically known as Ulaga vidangam. The Olageshwarar temple dedicated to Shiva, was constructed in the 12th century CE, and consists of various inscriptions from the Middle Ages.

== Geography and administration ==
Olagadam is located in Bhavani taluk, Gobichettipalayam division of Erode district in the Indian state of Tamil Nadu. Spread across an area of 5.56 km^{2} (2.15 sq mi), it is one of the 42 panchayat towns in the district. It is located in the north-western part of the state.

The town panchayat is headed by a chairperson, who is elected by the members, who are chosen through direct elections. The town forms part of the Bhavani Assembly constituency that elects its member to the Tamil Nadu legislative assembly and the Tiruppur Lok Sabha constituency that elects its member to the Parliament of India.

== Demographics ==
As per the 2011 census, Olagadam had a population of 9,958 individuals across 2,851 households. The population saw a marginal increase compared to the previous census in 2001 when 9,370 inhabitants were registered. The population consisted of 5,062 males and 4,896 females. About 856 individuals were below the age of six years. The entire population is classified as urban. The town has an average literacy rate of 66.1%. About 13.1% of the population belonged to scheduled castes.

About 60.5% of the eligible population were employed, of which majority were involved in agriculture and allied activities. Hinduism was the majority religion which was followed by 92.3% of the population, with Islam (7.5%) and Christianity (0.1%) being minor religions.
