= Nerunjipettai =

- Panchayat town
- Location in Tamil Nadu, India
- Coordinates: 11.7°N 77.7667°E
- Country: India
- State: Tamil Nadu
- District: Erode

Area
  - Total: 10.47 km^{2} (4.04 sq mi)

Population (2011)
  - Total: 6,791
  - Density: 648.6/km^{2} (1,680/sq mi)

Languages
  - Official: Tamil
- Time zone: UTC+5:30 (IST)

Nerunjipettai is a panchayat town in Bhavani taluk of Erode district in the Indian state of Tamil Nadu. It is located in the north-western part of the state. Spread across an area of 10.47 km^{2} (4.04 sq mi), it had a population of 6,791 individuals as per the 2011 census.

== Geography and administration ==
Nerunjipettai is located in Bhavani taluk, Gobichettipalayam division of Erode district in the Indian state of Tamil Nadu. Spread across an area of 10.47 km^{2} (4.04 sq mi), it is one of the 42 panchayat towns in the district. It is located in the north-western part of the state.

The town panchayat is headed by a chairperson, who is elected by the members, who are chosen through direct elections. The town forms part of the Bhavani Assembly constituency that elects its member to the Tamil Nadu legislative assembly and the Tiruppur Lok Sabha constituency that elects its member to the Parliament of India.

== Demographics ==
As per the 2011 census, Nerunjipettai had a population of 6,791 individuals across 1,961 households. The population saw a reduction compared to the previous census in 2001 when 6,925 inhabitants were registered. The population consisted of 3,446 males and 3,345 females. About 611 individuals were below the age of six years. The entire population is classified as urban. The town has an average literacy rate of 66.4%. About 19.8% of the population belonged to scheduled castes.

About 55.7% of the eligible population were employed, of which majority were involved in agriculture and allied activities. Hinduism was the majority religion which was followed by 90.7% of the population, with Christianity (8.0%) and Islam (1.3%) being minor religions.
