= Keelsathambur =

Village in Namakkal district, Tamil Nadu, India

Kilsathambur is a village situated in Namakkal district of Tamil Nadu, India. It is one of the biggest village in population and in area in Namakkal district. It is located 20 km from Namakkal and 11 km from Velur.

== Demographics ==
As of 2011, the total population is 2908 of which 1429 are males while 1479 are females.

== Literacy ==
As of 2011, the literacy rate of village was 66.97% compared to 80.09% of Tamil Nadu.
