= Tiruchirappalli Bicycle Share =

Overview
- Owner: Government of Tamil Nadu
- Transit type: Bicycle sharing system
- Number of stations: 50
- Headquarters: Tiruchirappalli

Operation
- Began operation: Project was cancelled on 2019
- Operator: Tiruchirappalli City Municipal Corporation

Tiruchirappalli Bicycle Share was a proposed bicycle sharing system for the city of Tiruchirappalli.

== Background ==
In November 2013, the two-day conference on "Sustainable Cities Through Transport" at Coimbatore, with respective city engineers from Madurai, Tiruchi, Tirupur, Salem and Coimbatore, stressed for improving non–motorised transport in city corporations and town municipalities and also chalked out plans for creation of transit systems, pedestrian pathways, cycling tracks, parks, pedestrian zones, etc. While presenting the same at a workshop in Chennai by concerned Corporation officials, chaired by K. P. Munusamy, State Minister of Municipal Administration and Rural Development, Law, Courts and Prisons and officials of the ministry, the Corporation Commissioner of Tiruchi City, V. P. Thandapani declared that about 2000 bicycles will be put to use for public use and on the infrastructure front, he stated that at an outlay of ₹150 crore (US$16 million), 28 kilometres (17 mi) of cycling tracks, 52 kilometres (32 mi) of pedestrian pathways and 11 kilometres (6.8 mi) of green lines will be constructed, of which, 10.7 kilometres (6.6 mi) of cycle tracks will be completed by next year.

The plan was developed in association with Institute for Transportation and Development Policy (ITDP) and International Council for Local Environmental Initiatives (ICLEI) is being funded by Ministry of Urban Development would create exclusive bicycle lanes with 66 "cycle sharing stations", besides improving the city's road infrastructure and future transport modes, which presently has narrow roads and indiscriminate encroachments coupled with booming vehicle population.

In December 2019, the Trichy City Corporation has shelved its plan for bike sharing.

== See also ==
- List of bicycle sharing systems
- Utility cycling
- Human-powered transport
