= Appakudal =

Panchayat town in the Erode District, Tamil Nadu, India

Appakkudal Aapakudal
- Panchayat town
- Appakkudal, Tamil Nadu
- Coordinates: 11°28′34.3″N 77°34′34.7″E
- Country: India
- State: Tamil Nadu
- District: Erode

Area
  - Total: 7.44 km^{2} (2.87 sq mi)
- Elevation: 215 m (705 ft)

Population (2011)
  - Total: 10,610
  - Density: 1,430/km^{2} (3,690/sq mi)

Languages
  - Official: Tamil
- Time zone: UTC+5:30 (IST)
- Vehicle registration: TN-36

Appakudal is a panchayat town in Bhavani taluk of Erode district in the Indian state of Tamil Nadu. It is located in the north-western part of the state. Spread across an area of 7.44 km^{2} (2.87 sq mi), it had a population of 10,610 individuals as per the 2011 census.

== Geography and administration ==
Appakudal is located in Bhavani taluk, Gobichettipalayam division of Erode district in the Indian state of Tamil Nadu. Spread across an area of 7.44 km^{2} (2.87 sq mi), it is one of the 42 panchayat towns in the district. It is located in the north-western part of the state towards the southern end of the Indian peninsula. There is a lake located in the town.

The town panchayat is headed by a chairperson, who is elected by the members, who are chosen through direct elections. The town forms part of the Bhavani Assembly constituency that elects its member to the Tamil Nadu legislative assembly and the Tiruppur Lok Sabha constituency that elects its member to the Parliament of India.

== Demographics ==
As per the 2011 census, Appakudal had a population of 10,610 individuals across 3,149 households. The population saw a marginal increase compared to the previous census in 2001 when 9,522 inhabitants were registered. The population consisted of 5,309 males and 5,301 females. About 666 individuals were below the age of six years. The entire population is classified as urban. The town has an average literacy rate of 71.7%. About 10.7% of the population belonged to scheduled castes.

About 52.6% of the eligible population were employed. About 37% of the population was employed in agriculture and allied activities. A private sugar mill also contributes to the employment in the region. Hinduism was the majority religion which was followed by 96.2% of the population, with Christianity (2.6%) and Islam (0.8%) being minor religions.
