= Ammapettai =

Ammapettai may refer to,

- Ammapettai (Erode district), a town in Erode district, Tamil Nadu, India
- Ammapettai, Salem, a town in Salem, Tamil Nadu, India
- Ammapettai (Thanjavur district), a town in Thanjavur district, Tamil Nadu
  - Ammapettai block, a subdivision of the district
