= Agaram Nagar Panchayat =

Agaram Panchayat
- panchayat town
- Location in Tamil Nadu, India
- Coordinates: 12.82°N 78.88°E
- Country: India
- State: Tamil Nadu
- District: Dindigul
- Elevation: 297 m (974 ft)

Population (2001)
  - Total: 12,784

Languages
  - Official: Tamil
- Time zone: UTC+5:30 (IST)

Agaram is a panchayat town in Dindigul district, Tamil Nadu, India.

== Geography ==
Agaram is located at 12.82°N 78.88°E. It has an average elevation of 297 metres (974 feet).

== Demographics ==
By the 2001 census of India, Agaram had a population of 12,784. Males constitute 50% of the population and females 50%. Agaram has an average literacy rate of 58%, lower than the national average of 59.5%; with 58% of the males and 42% of females literate. 11% of the population is under 6 years of age.

== See also ==
- Govindavadi
