= Kembainaickenpalayam =

Kembanaickenpalayam
- Panchayat town
- Location in Tamil Nadu, India
- Coordinates: 11°32′8″N 77°18′10″E
- Country: India
- State: Tamil Nadu
- District: Erode

Area
  - Total: 14 km^{2} (5.4 sq mi)

Population (2011)
  - Total: 11,103
  - Density: 790/km^{2} (2,100/sq mi)

Languages
  - Official: Tamil
- Time zone: UTC+5:30 (IST)

Kembanaickenpalayam is a panchayat town in Sathyamangalam taluk of Erode district in the Indian state of Tamil Nadu. It is located in the north-western part of the state. Spread across an area of 14 km^{2} (5.4 sq mi), it had a population of 11,103 individuals as per the 2011 census.

== Geography and administration ==
Kembanaickenpalayam is located in Sathyamangalam taluk, Gobichettipalayam division of Erode district in the Indian state of Tamil Nadu. Spread across an area of 14 km^{2} (5.4 sq mi), it is one of the 42 panchayat towns in the district. It is located in the north-western part of the state.

The town panchayat is headed by a chairperson, who is elected by the members, who are chosen through direct elections. The town forms part of the Sathyamangalam Assembly constituency that elects its member to the Tamil Nadu legislative assembly and the Nilgiris Lok Sabha constituency that elects its member to the Parliament of India.

== Demographics ==
As per the 2011 census, Kembanaickenpalayam had a population of 11,103 individuals. The population saw a marginal increase compared to the previous census in 2001 when 10,308 inhabitants were registered. The population consisted of 5,622 males and 5,481 females. The entire population is classified as urban. The town has an average literacy rate of 58.1%. About 16.9% of the population belonged to scheduled castes.

About 60.5% of the eligible population were employed. Hinduism was the majority religion which was followed by 99.3% of the population, with Christianity (0.4%) and Islam (0.2%) being minor religions.

== Culture and landmarks ==
=== Periya Samy Kovil ===
Kembanaickenpalayam is home to the Arulmigu Periya Samy Kovil, a village temple dating back to the 19th century. The temple is known for its annual festival, which features traditional processions, communal meals, and temporary market stalls that draw residents from surrounding villages.

=== Sumai Thangi ===
Historical stone structures known locally as Sumai Thangi (burden-bearers) are located along the roadsides in Kembanaickenpalayam. Installed in the early 20th century, these elevated stone slabs served as resting platforms where pedestrians carrying headloads from markets could unload their goods without assistance. According to local inscriptions and regional heritage traditions, such monuments were often erected in memory of women who died during childbirth.

=== Economy and geography ===
Commercial activity in the town centers around the local K. N. Palayam Market on Mariamman Kovil Street, which serves as a hub for regional agricultural produce and vegetable vendors. Geographically, the town sits near the foothills of the Kadambur hills and the Sathyamangalam Wildlife Sanctuary (Talamalai Reserve Forest). Nearby water infrastructure includes the Perumpallam Dam, a reservoir constructed between 1984 and 1989 at the Kadambur foothills with a storage capacity of 0.5 tmcft to irrigate roughly 1,030 hectares of agricultural land.
