= Anthiyur taluk =

Indian district

Coordinates: 11.58°N 77.60°E

Anthiyur taluk (Tamil: அந்தியூர் வட்டம்) is a taluk of Erode district of the Indian state of Tamil Nadu. Anthiyur became separate taluk in Erode district by restructuring Bhavani and Gobichettipalayam on 22 November 2012. It comprises four blocks – Anthiyur, Athani, Burgur and Ammapet It comes under Gobichettipalayam Revenue Division.

== Demographics ==
The taluk of Anthiyur had a population of ~225,900.
