= Jedarpalayam =

Indian village and local government

Coordinates: 11.151972°N 77.891746°E

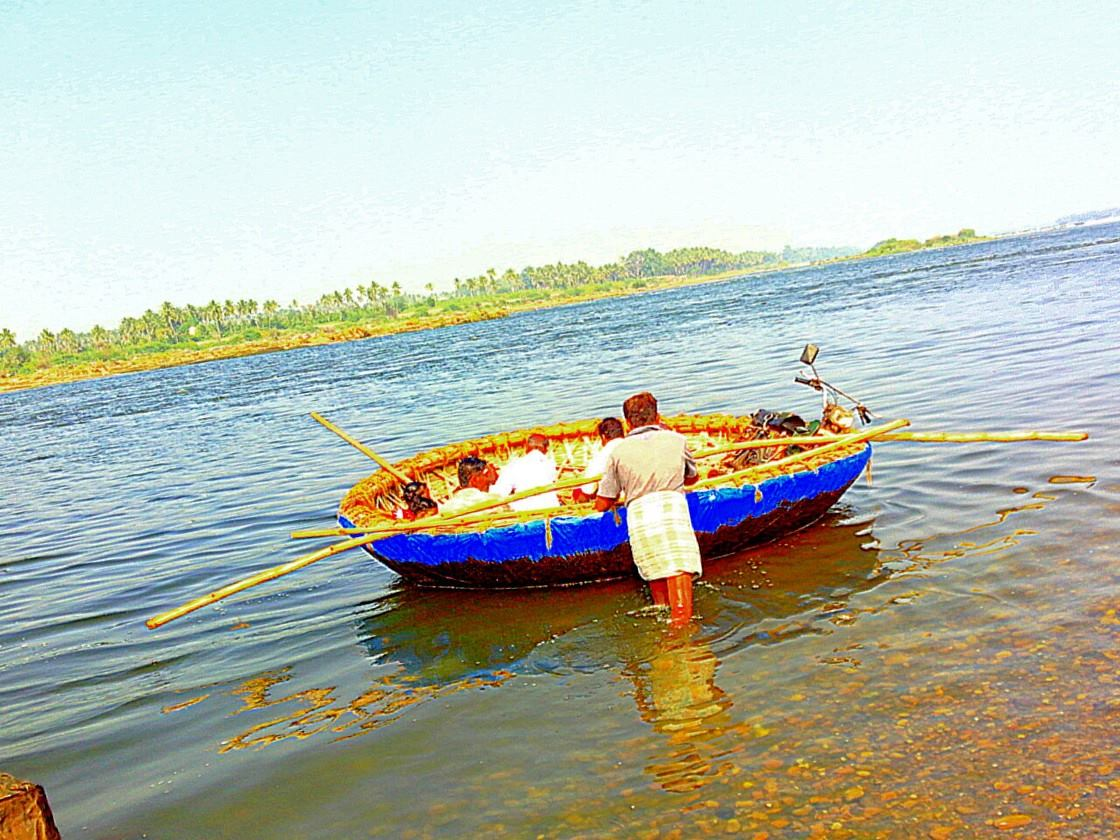

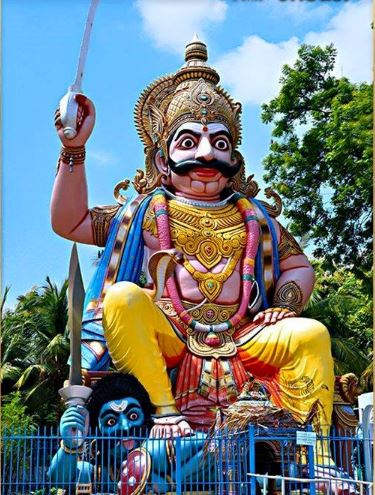

Jedarpalayam is a small village and a panchayat in Namakkal district of Tamil Nadu, India.

== Geography ==
Jedarpalayam is located 33 kilometres (21 mi) from District Headquarters and 16 kilometres (9.9 mi) from Taluk Headquarters Paramathi Velur. The village is located very close to Cauvery River. Village also well connected via Buses from near by towns and cities like Erode, Tiruchengode, Paramathi-Velur, Coimbatore and Salem . Its population around 4000 families.

== Economy ==
The economy of the village is primarily agricultural, with the major crops being sugar cane, turmeric and coconut trees and then silk saree handloom weaving and silk sarees retail shops are the most predominant one. Jedarpalayam cauvery river check dam, children's park and boat house are major tourist attractions and it also helps in boosting village economy
