= Ariyappampalayam =

Ayyampalayam
- Panchayat town
- Location in Tamil Nadu, India
- Coordinates: 11°23′45″N 77°4′47″E
- Country: India
- State: Tamil Nadu
- District: Erode

Area
  - Total: 9.06 km^{2} (3.50 sq mi)

Population (2011)
  - Total: 15,706
  - Density: 1,730/km^{2} (4,490/sq mi)

Languages
  - Official: Tamil
- Time zone: UTC+5:30 (IST)
- Postal code: 641402
- Vehicle registration: TN 36

Ayyampalayam is a panchayat town in Sathyamangalam taluk of Erode district in the Indian state of Tamil Nadu. It is located in the north-western part of the state. Spread across an area of 9.06 km^{2} (3.50 sq mi), it had a population of 15,706 individuals as per the 2011 census.

== Geography and administration ==
Ariyappampalayam is located in Sathyamangalam taluk, Gobichettipalayam division of Erode district in the Indian state of Tamil Nadu. Spread across an area of 7.44 km^{2} (2.87 sq mi), it is one of the 42 panchayat towns in the district. It is located in the north-western part of the state towards the southern end of the Indian peninsula.

The town panchayat is headed by a chairperson, who is elected by the members, who are chosen through direct elections. The town forms part of the Bhavanisagar Assembly constituency that elects its member to the Tamil Nadu legislative assembly and the Nilgiris Lok Sabha constituency that elects its member to the Parliament of India.

== Demographics ==
As per the 2011 census, Ariyappampalayam had a population of 15,706 individuals. The population saw a significant increase compared to the previous census in 2001 when 12,462 inhabitants were registered. The population consisted of 7,809 males and 7,897 females. The entire population is classified as urban. The town has an average literacy rate of 68%. About 14.1% of the population belonged to scheduled castes.

About 45% of the eligible population was employed. Hinduism was the majority religion which was followed by 94.3% of the population, with Christianity (3.0%) and Islam (2.4%) being minor religions.
