= Edaikodu =

Edaikodu Edaicode
- Town
- Location in Tamil Nadu, India
- Coordinates: 8°23′12″N 77°12′02″E
- Country: India
- State: Tamil Nadu
- District: Kanniyakumari

Population (2001)
  - Total: 23,320

Languages
  - Official: Tamil
- Time zone: UTC+5:30 (IST)

Edaicode is a panchayat town in Kanniyakumari district in the state of Tamil Nadu, India.

== Demographics ==
As of 2001 India census, Edaicode had a population of 23,320. Males constitute 49% of the population and females 51%. Edaicode has an average literacy rate of 78%, higher than the national average of 59.5%: male literacy is 82%, and female literacy is 75%. In Edaicode, 10% of the population is under 6 years of age.

In Edaicode there is a 24/7 Public Health Centre (PHC).

== See also ==
- Alappancode Easwara Kala Bhoothathan Temple
- CSI district church chirakkarai
