= Gopalasamudram =

- town
- Location in Tamil Nadu, India
- Coordinates: 8°40′28″N 77°38′16″E
- Country: India
- State: Tamil Nadu
- District: Tirunelveli
- Chief minister: MK Stalin
- Governor: Banwarilal Purohit
- Taluk: cheranmahadevi

Population (2011)
  - Total: 10,694

Languages
  - Official: Tamil
- Time zone: UTC+5:30 (IST)
- PIN: 627451
- Telephone code: 91 4634
- Vehicle registration: TN 72

Gopalasamudram is a panchayat town in Tirunelveli district in the Indian state of Tamil Nadu. Gopalasamudram is situated on the banks of the river Tamirabarani. Gopalasamudram comes under the taluk of Cheranmahadevi. In the state assembly elections it belongs to the Tirunelveli legislative assembly and it comes under Tirunelveli constituency in Lok Sabha elections. An ancient ShivaTemple, Vishnu Temple and Ganesha temples are also located in this village

== Demographics ==
As of 2011 India census, The total population in Gopalasamudram town is 10,694.

- There are 2,890 House Holds in Gopalasamudram.
- There are 5,338 males (50%) There are 5,356 females (50%).
- .Scheduled Caste are 2,593 (24%) Total Scheduled Tribe are 15 (0%).
- In Gopalasamudram, the total number of Workers are 5,470 (51%). 4,410 are regular Workers and 1,060 are Irregular Workers.
- There are total of 5,224 Non Workers (49%) in Gopalasamudram.
- While the total population is 10,694, the children below 6 years of age are 1,144 of which 597 are males and 547 are females.
- Literates in the town are 8,269, which is about 77% in the population of which males are 4,355 and females are 3,914.
- Literacy rate of Gopalasamudram is 77% which is more than the national average of 74.04%.
- There are 2,425 total Illiterates in this town which comes to around 23% of the town's population.
