= Vadugapatti, Erode =

Vadugapatti
- Panchayat town
- Location in Tamil Nadu, India
- Coordinates: 11°10′4″N 77°43′41″E
- Country: India
- State: Tamil Nadu
- District: Erode

Area
  - Total: 30 km^{2} (12 sq mi)

Population (2011)
  - Total: 9,657
  - Density: 320/km^{2} (830/sq mi)

Languages
  - Official: Tamil
- Time zone: UTC+5:30 (IST)

Vadugapatti is a panchayat town in Erode taluk of Erode district in the Indian state of Tamil Nadu. It is located in the north-western part of the state. Spread across an area of 30 km^{2} (12 sq mi), it had a population of 9,657 individuals as per the 2011 census.

== Geography and administration ==
Vadugapatti is located in Erode taluk, Erode division of Erode district in the Indian state of Tamil Nadu. Spread across an area of 30 km^{2} (12 sq mi), it is one of the 42 panchayat towns in the district. It is located in the north-western part of the state.

Vadugapatti panchayat is headed by a chairperson, who is elected by the members, who are chosen through direct elections. The town forms part of the Erode West Assembly constituency that elects its member to the Tamil Nadu legislative assembly and the Erode Lok Sabha constituency that elects its member to the Parliament of India.

== Demographics ==
As per the 2011 census, Vadugapatti had a population of 9,657 individuals across 2,928 households. The population saw a marginal decrease compared to the previous census in 2001 when 10,921 inhabitants were registered. The population consisted of 4,810 males and 4,847 females. About 699 individuals were below the age of six years. The entire population is classified as urban. The town has an average literacy rate of 68.2%. About 24.6% of the population belonged to scheduled castes.

About 66.8% of the eligible population were employed with majority involved in agriculture and allied activities. In 2023, the Government of Tamil Nadu announced that a storage facility will be established in the town panchayat to aid in storage of agricultural produce such as turmeric. Hinduism was the majority religion which was followed by 96.7% of the population, with Christianity (3.0%) and Islam (0.1%) being minor religions.
