= Alappancode Easwara Kala Bhoothathan Temple =

Temple in Tamil Nadu

Alappancode Sree Easwarakala Bhoothathan Temple
- Alappancode Ammavan Temple
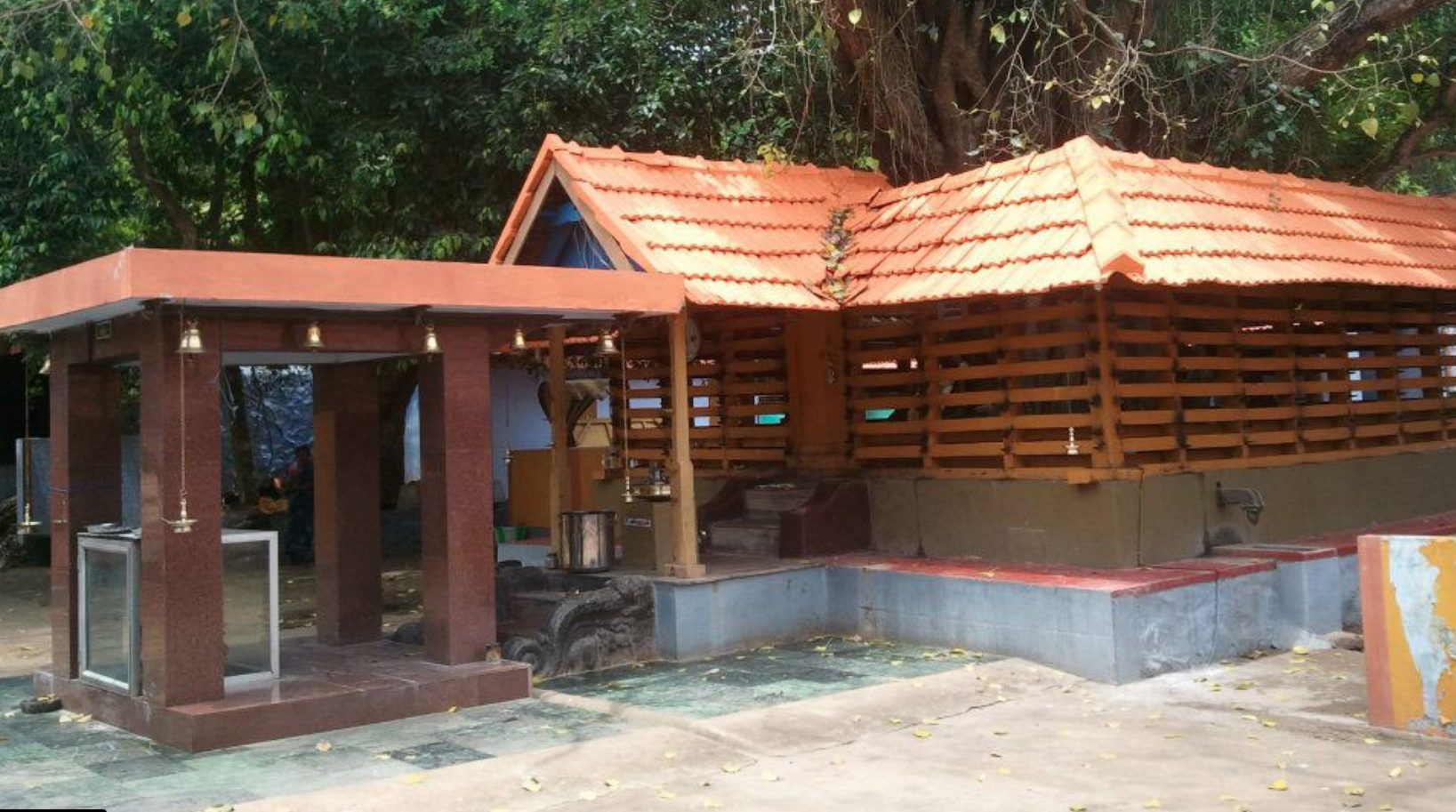
- Alappancode Temple

- Location in Tamil Nadu

Religion
- Affiliation: Hinduism
- District: Kanyakumari
- Deity: Lord Easwarakala Bhothathan(Alappancode Ammavan)-Avatara of Lord Shiva, Swamy Ayyappan & Sree Bhadrakali.
- Festival: Alappancode Ammavan Ezhunallath
- Governing body: Hereditary Trust

Location
- Location: Anducode, Kanniyakumari
- State: Tamil Nadu
- Country: India
- Interactive map of Alappancode Sree Easwarakala Bhoothathan Temple
- Coordinates: 8°20′42.7″N 77°12′42.6″E

Architecture
- Type: Kerala architecture
- Completed: 150

Alappancode Sree Easwarakala Bhoothathan Temple is a very ancient and known centre of pilgrimage for the devotees of Alappancode Ammavan (Eswarakala Bhoothathan).

== See also ==
- Sabarimala
