= Local government in Tamil Nadu =

Local administrative units in Tamil Nadu

Local government in Tamil Nadu consists of a three tier administrative set-up. The local bodies are classified into urban and rural. The urban bodies consisted of municipal corporations, municipalities, and town panchayats. District panchayats, Panchayat unions, and Village panchayats make up the rural administrative units. The Greater Chennai Corporation, established in 1688, is the oldest urban local body in India.

The Department of Municipal Administration and Water Supply is the state government department responsible for the administration, water supply and sewage of urban local bodies in the state. The Department of Rural Development and Panchayat Raj is the state government department responsible for rural development and development and administration of rural local bodies.

== History ==
Historically, the Tamilakam region was organised into various local bodies, which is evident from various epigraph inscriptions. A village administration was taken care by a village assembly known as sabai, each village was further sub-divided into several wards known as mandalams for ease of administration. A pot-ticket system of election (kudavolai), which used marked palm leaves, was used to elect the local representatives during the Chola period in the Middle Ages.

Though no formal local administrative structure was existent at the time, the Greater Chennai Corporation, established in 1688, is the oldest urban local body in India. During the British Raj, centralisation of governance was enforced, with most of the administration in the hands of the provincial administration. In the late 19th century, unions were created in smaller towns and villages, to facilitate local needs such as sanitation and lighting. Later, local councils were constituted whose members were directly elected, and were made accountable to an inspector and chairman. The local and municipal department was established in 1916, and had local, municipal, plague, medical and legislative branches.

After Indian independence, various suggestions were heard by the government for the reformation of the local administrative structure. The Balwant Rai Mehta Committee, appointed in this regard, suggested the formation of three-tier Panchayati Raj system. Apart from the basic tenets covered in the Article 40 of the Indian Constitution, various acts have been enacted by the state government covering the powers and functions of the local bodies. These include the Madras Village Panchayat Act (1950), Tamil Nadu District Municipalities (Amendment) Act (1950), Tamil Nadu Panchayats Act (1958), Tamil Nadu District Development Councils Act (1958), Tamil Nadu Panchayats Act (1994), Tamil Nadu Municipal Laws (Amendment) Act (2016), and Tamil Nadu Panchayats (Amendment) Act (2016). The latest laws enacted in 2016 implemented a fifty percent reservation for women in all local bodies.

== Objectives and functions ==
Developmental administration is the main objective of these local bodies. The administrative system constitutes various urban and rural local bodies. The local bodies are responsible for the local administration and maintenance of facilities such as water supply, roads, healthcare, street lighting, sanitation, sewage and waste management, and public buildings like bus stations and markets. These local bodies have the power to levy house and commercial taxes, apart from collection of fees for services and approvals. The local bodies are also responsible for the implementation of central and state government programs and schemes at the local level. The Department of Municipal Administration and Water Supply is the state government department responsible for the administration, water supply and sewage of urban local bodies in the state. The Department of Rural Development and Panchayat Raj is the state government department responsible for rural development and development and administration of rural local bodies.

== Elections ==
Elections to the local bodies in Tamil Nadu are conducted by Tamil Nadu State Election Commission. Councillors are elected through direct elections, who in turn elect the mayor, chairman or president of the corporation, municipality or panchayat respectively.

== Administrative units ==
=== Urban Local Bodies ===
Urban local bodies are divided into three categories depending on the population and income. These consist of municipal corporations, municipalities, and town panchayats. Municipal corporations cater to larger urban areas, municipalities serve smaller urban areas, and town panchayats cater to areas that are under transition from rural to urban.

Larger cities are governed by municipal corporations, headed by a mayor, who presides over elected councilors representing individual wards. As of 2025, there are 25 municipal corporations in Tamil Nadu. Municipalities form the second tier, and are classified into four categories based on their annual income. Their elected representatives include ward councilors headed by a chairperson with the municipal commissioner serving as the executive authority. As of 2025, there are 138 municipalities in the state.

Tamil Nadu was the first state to establish town panchayats as a new administrative unit. They are classified into four categories based on their annual income. Their elected representatives include councilors and a presiding officer, panchayat chairman. As of 2025, there are 490 town panchayats in the state.

=== Rural Local Bodies ===
The rural local bodies are classified into District panchayats, Panchayat unions, and Village panchayats.

District panchayats form the upper tier of the panchayat system, and is responsible for the developmental administration of the rural areas in a district. It consists of ward members elected from various villages in its jurisdiction, who are presided by chairperson, who is indirectly elected by its ward members. As of 2025, there are 31 district panchayats in this state except for the district of Chennai, with the respective District collectors serving as the ex-officio chairman of the District rural development agency.

Panchayat unions consist of a group of village panchayats, and serve as a link between the villages and the district administration at the taluk level. The union council consists of elected ward members from the villages, headed by a chairperson, who is elected indirectly by the ward members of the council. As of 2025, the state has 388 panchayat unions.

Village panchayats form the last level of the local governance structure. The panchayat president is the executive authority in the panchayat, and is responsible for convening the Gram sabha, a discussion open to all residents of the village, at least four times an year. As of 2025, there are about 12,620 village panchayats in this state.

=== District wise list ===
Sl.No:
Sl.No:	District					
Sl.No:	District	Urban			Rural	
Sl.No:	District	Corporations	Municipalities	Town panchayats	Panchayat unions	Village panchayats
1	Ariyalur	0	2	2	6	201
2	Chengalpattu	1	4	6	8	NA
3	Chennai	1	0	0	0	0
4	Coimbatore	1	6	52	13	389
5	Cuddalore	1	5	16	13	682
6	Dharmapuri	0	2	10	8	251
7	Dindigul	1	2	24	14	306
8	Erode	1	4	53	14	343
9	Kallakurichi	0	3	5	9	NA
10	Kancheepuram	1	10	24	13	648
11	Kanniyakumari	1	4	56	9	99
12	Karur	1	4	11	8	157
13	Krishnagiri	1	2	7	10	337
14	Madurai	1	6	24	12	431
15	Mayiladuthurai	0	2	4	5	223
16	Nagapattinam	0	2	4	6	211
17	Namakkal	1	4	19	15	331
18	Nilgiris	0	4	11	4	35
19	Perambalur	0	1	4	4	121
20	Pudukkottai	1	1	8	13	498
21	Ramanathapuram	0	4	7	11	443
22	Ranipet	0	6	8	7	NA
23	Salem	1	4	33	20	385
24	Sivagangai	1	3	12	12	445
25	Tenkasi	0	7	17	11	NA
26	Thanjavur	2	2	22	14	589
27	Theni	0	6	22	8	130
28	Thiruvallur	1	5	13	14	539
29	Thiruvannamalai	1	3	10	18	860
30	Thiruvarur	0	4	7	10	430
31	Thoothukudi	1	2	19	12	408
32	Tiruchirappalli	1	3	17	14	408
33	Tirunelveli	1	8	36	19	425
34	Tirupattur	0	4	3	6	NA
35	Tiruppur	1	6	17	13	273
36	Vellore	1	8	22	20	753
37	Villupuram	0	3	15	22	1104
38	Virudhunagar	1	6	9	11	450
Total	38	25	118	529	385	12,524

== See also ==
- List of Developmental administrative units of Tamil Nadu
