= Veerapandi, Theni =

Coordinates: 9°57′52″N 77°27′08″E

Veerapandi
- panchayat gram
- Interactive map of Veerapandi
- Country: India
- State: Tamil Nadu
- District: Theni

Population (2001)
  - Total: 14,248

Languages
  - Official: Tamil
- Time zone: UTC+5:30 (IST)

Veerapandi is a panchayat gram in Theni district in the Indian state of Tamil Nadu.

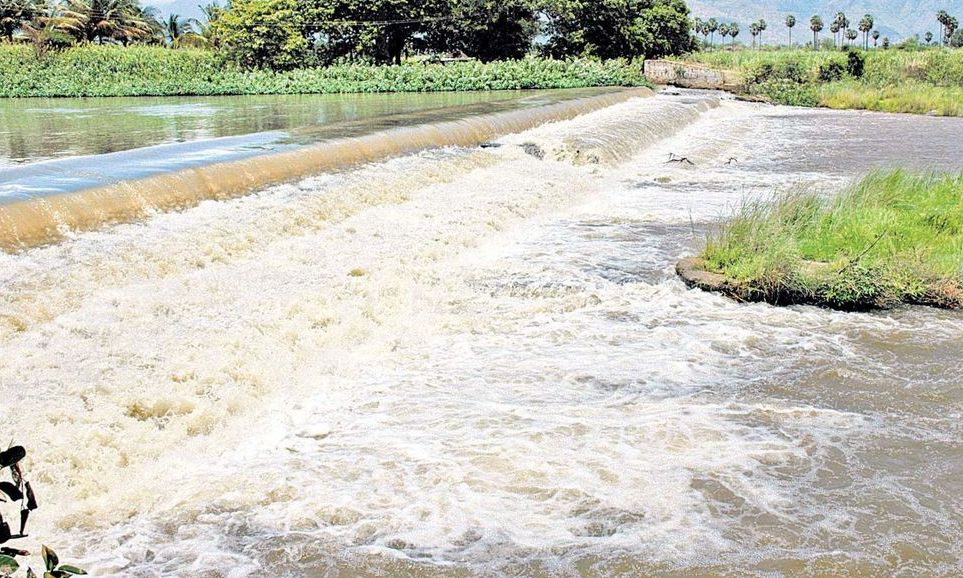
Mullai-Periyar River in Veerapandi, Theni

== Demographics ==
As of 2001 India census, Veerapandi had a population of 14,248. Males constitute 52% of the population and females 48%. Veerapandi has an average literacy rate of 65%, higher than the national average of 59.5%: male literacy is 75%, and female literacy is 54%. In Veerapandi, 11% of the population is under 6 years of age.

Veerapandi Gowmari Amman Temple, Kanneeswaramudaiyar Temple, Pottiamman Temple, Villendhiya Nallaiyan Temple, Kaattu Kaliamman Temple, Kamuthai Temple (Well Temple), Ayyanar Temple, Vaikaal Pillayar Koil, Gowmariamman Koil Veedu, Chellandiamman Temple,Silakariyamman Kovil (valanthur temple under) and petchi viruman temple(south), etc. Because of this Kamuthai Temple (Well Temple), many people of this town are known by the names Kamuthurai (males) and Kamuthai (females). Yearly Chithirai Gowmariamman festival is celebrated in this town. This famous festival is celebrated for 8 days (Traditionally followed from last Tuesday of Tamil month Chithirai to first Tuesday of next Tamil month Vaikasi - will fall in May month). This is a famous festival and visited by devotees around the country.

== Location ==
This town is situated at 80 km west of the Madurai and 8 km from Theni. The Mullai river flows through this town.

== Festival ==
Yearly Chithirai Thiruvizha of Gowmariamman temple is celebrated for 8 days in May month. In these 8 days, millions of tourists and devotees arrive and celebrate the festival. Raising 'Kavadi' and "Agni Chatti" (Thee chatti) for the Goddess Gowmariamman is the main part of the worship.

Cart festival is most popular during Chithirai Thiruvizha. Goddess Gowmariamman will give Dharsan to devotees in different appearances with flowers, fruits, etc. This festival is most popular in southern Tamil Nadu. Government arranges 24 hours bus services from all southern cities and towns of Tamil Nadu.

== Occupation ==
Agriculture is the main occupation for the people of Veerapandi. This village is a tourist destination due to its natural resources (mullai river, lush green fields, ancient temples, etc.).

== Panoramic View of Veerapandi River ==
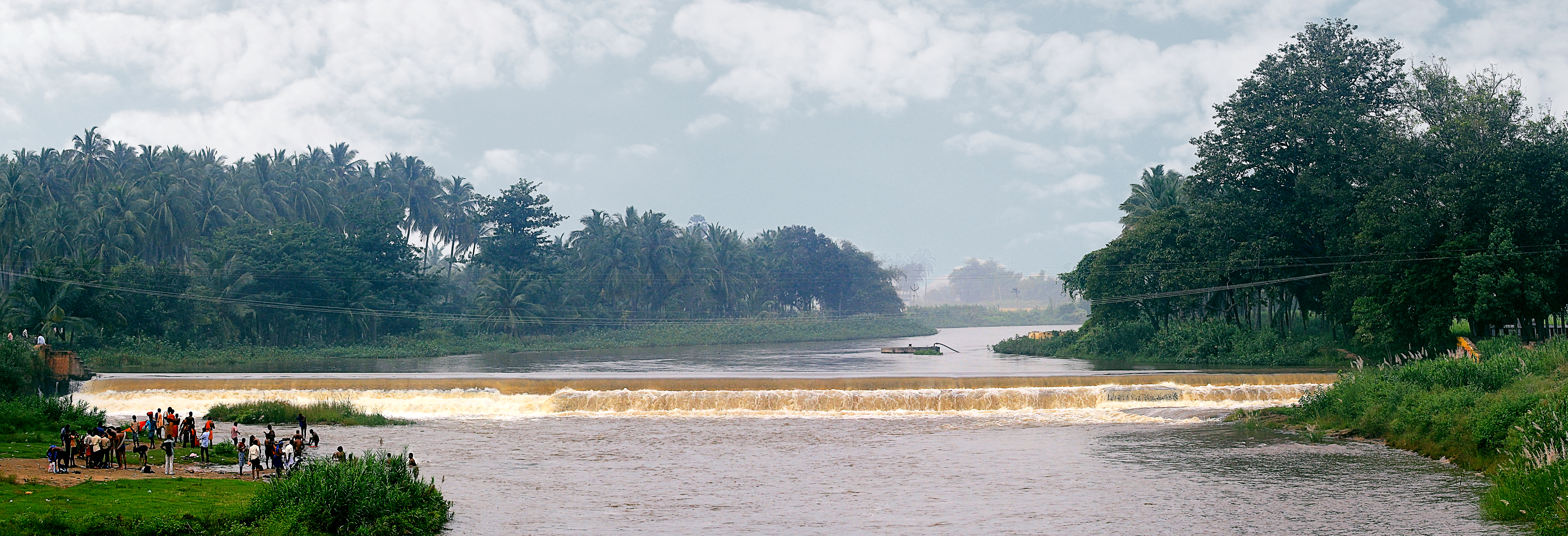
