= Valvaithankoshtam =

Coordinates: 8°16′41″N 77°15′44″E

- panchayat town
- Interactive map of Valvaithankoshtam
- Country: India
- State: Tamil Nadu
- District: Kanniyakumari

Population (2001)
  - Total: 16,698

Languages
  - Official: Tamil
- Time zone: UTC+5:30 (IST)

Valvaithankoshtam is a panchayat town in Kanniyakumari district in the Indian state of Tamil Nadu.

== Demographics ==
As of 2001 India census, Valvaithankoshtam had a population of 16,698. Males constitute 50% of the population and females 50%. Valvaithankoshtam has an average literacy rate of 99%, higher than the national average of 59.5%: male literacy is 100%, and female literacy is 99%. In Valvaithankoshtam, 11% of the population is under 6 years of age.
