= Kallukuttam =

Kallukoottam Kallukoottam
- town
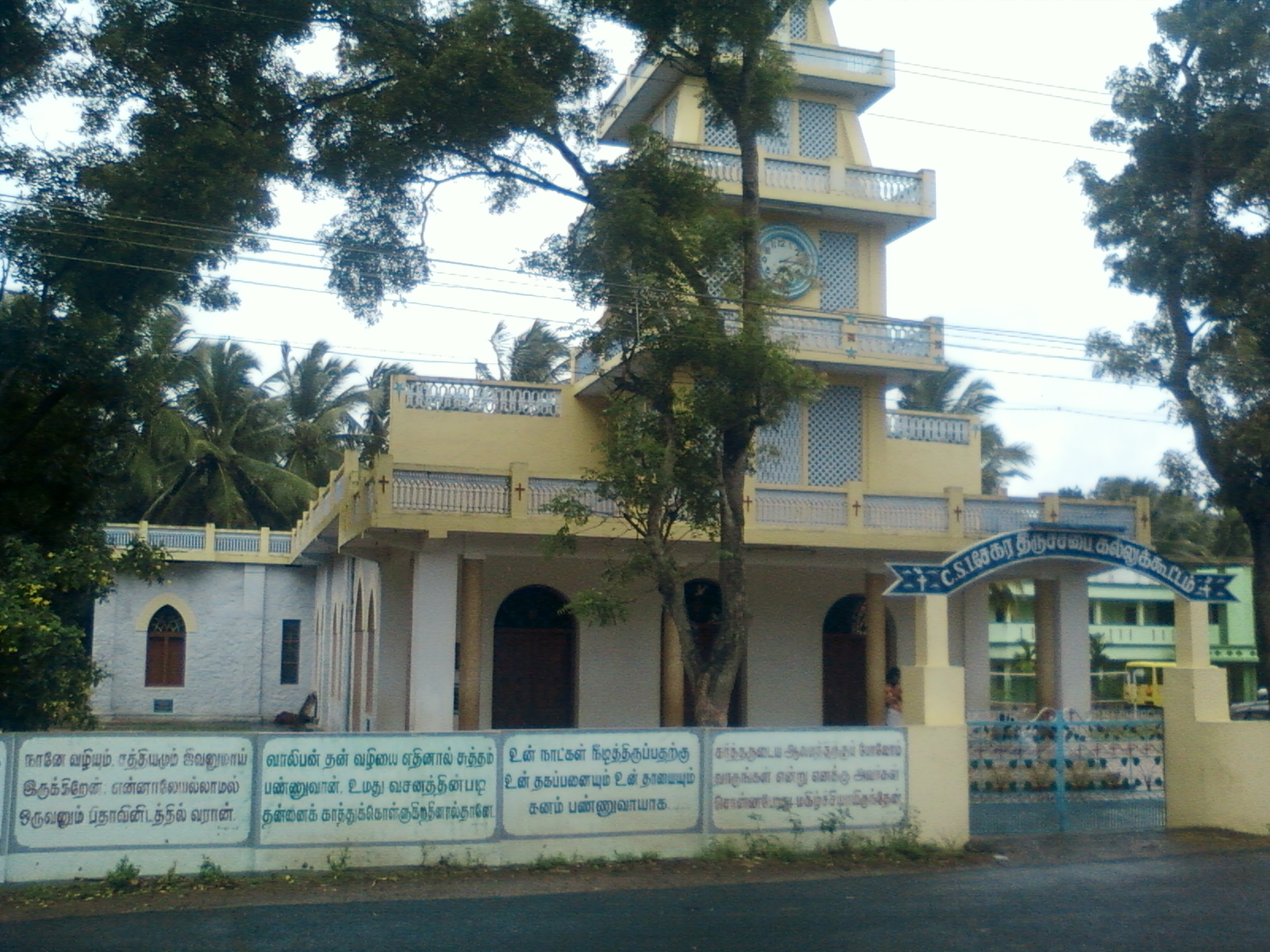
- Kallukootam CSI Church

- Location in Tamil Nadu, India
- Coordinates: 8°11′22″N 77°17′22″E
- Country: India
- State: Tamil Nadu
- District: Kanniyakumari

Government
  - Type: panchayat town

Population (2001)
  - Total: 16,662

Languages
  - Official: Tamil
- Time zone: UTC+5:30 (IST)
- PIN: 629802
- Telephone code: +91-4651
- Vehicle registration: TN/75

Kallukoottam is a panchayat town in Kanniyakumari district, Colachel Assembly constituency, in the Indian state of Tamil Nadu.

== Demographics ==
As of 2001 India census, Kallukoottam had a population of 16,662. Males constitute 50% of the population and females 50%. Kallukoottam has an average literacy rate of 81%, higher than the national average of 59.5%: male literacy is 83%, and female literacy is 79%. In Kallukoottam, 10% of the population is under 6 years of age.

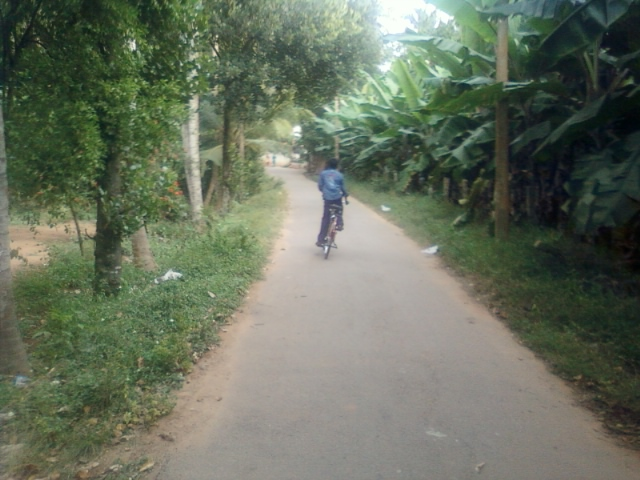
Kallukoottam street

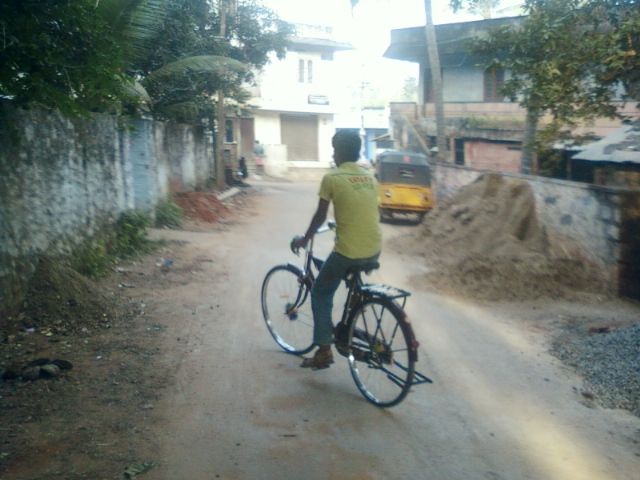
Street to the kallukootam junction
