= Pillanallur =

- Panchayat Town
- Location in Tamil Nadu, India
- Coordinates: 11°26′17″N 78°07′54″E
- Country: India
- State: Tamil Nadu
- District: Namakkal

Area
  - Total: 4.66 km^{2} (1.80 sq mi)

Population (2011)
  - Total: 11,181
  - Density: 2,400/km^{2} (6,210/sq mi)

Languages
  - Official: Tamil
- Time zone: UTC+5:30 (IST)

Pillanallur is a panchayat town in Rasipuram taluk of Namakkal district in the Indian state of Tamil Nadu. Spread across an area of 4.66 km^{2} (1.80 sq mi), the town panchayat is divided into 15 wards. It had a population of 11,181 as per the 2011 census. The Sivasubramaniyar Kovil dedicated to Murugan, which hosts several inscriptions, is located in Pillanallur.

== Geography and administration ==
Pillanallur is a town panchayat in Rasipuram taluk of Namakkal district in the Indian state of Tamil Nadu. It is located 29 km (18 mi) south of Namakkal. The town panchayat covers an area of 4.66 km^{2} (1.80 sq mi) and is divided into 15 wards and 35 streets. It is classified as a first grade (Grade - I) town panchayat (annual revenue between ₹ 5 to 10 million), and the panchayat administration is responsible for providing basic services including maintenance of roads, water supply, health and sanitation. Pillanallur forms part of the Rasipuram Assembly constituency of the Tamil Nadu Legislative Assembly and the Namakkal Lok Sabha constituency.

== Demographics and economy ==
According to the 2011 census, Pillanallur had a population of 11,181 across 3,127 households. The population consisted of 5,553 males and 5,628 females. About 978 (8.8%) of the population were children aged less than six years. The town panchayat had a literacy rate of approximately 74.5%, with male literacy at 82.9% and female literacy at 66.2%. Scheduled Castes accounted for approximately 9.6% of the population, while Scheduled Tribes accounted for nearly 0.1%. The working population constituted approximately 53.1% of the total population, comprising 5,934 workers, of whom 3,455 were males and 2,479 were females. Of the total working population, 96.7% were engaged in main work, while 3.3% were engaged in marginal work.

As per the 2011 census, Hinduism was the predominant religion, practiced by 99.5% of the population, followed by Christianity (0.3%), and Islam (0.2%). The town panchayat has five Hindu temples including the Sivasubramaniyar Kovil dedicated to Murugan, which hosts several inscriptions. There are three annual festivals celebrated in March, April, and November, dedicated to Hindu gods Kaliamman, Murugan, and Mariamman respectively.

== Transport ==
The town panchayat administration maintains about 32.6 km (20.3 mi) of roads. Pillanallur is located on the road connecting Rasipuram and Tiruchengode, about 3 km (1.9 mi) off the National Highway 44 (old NH-7). The nearest railway station is the Rasipuram railway station located approximately 7 km (4.3 mi) away.
