= Chennasamudram =

- Panchayat town
- Location in Tamil Nadu, India
- Coordinates: 11°3′16″N 77°54′28″E
- Country: India
- State: Tamil Nadu
- District: Erode

Area
  - Total: 10.83 km^{2} (4.18 sq mi)

Population (2011)
  - Total: 8,111
  - Density: 748.9/km^{2} (1,940/sq mi)

Languages
  - Official: Tamil
- Time zone: UTC+5:30 (IST)

Chennasamudram is a panchayat town in Kodumudi taluk of Erode district in the Indian state of Tamil Nadu. It is located in the north-western part of the state. Spread across an area of 10.83 km^{2} (4.18 sq mi), it had a population of 8,111 individuals as per the 2011 census.

== Geography and administration ==
Chennasamudram is located in Kodumudi taluk, Erode division of Erode district in the Indian state of Tamil Nadu. Spread across an area of 10.83 km^{2} (4.18 sq mi), it is one of the 42 panchayat towns in the district. It is located in the north-western part of the state towards the southern end of the Indian peninsula.

The town panchayat is headed by a chairperson, who is elected by the members, who are chosen through direct elections. The town forms part of the Modakkurichi Assembly constituency that elects its member to the Tamil Nadu legislative assembly and the Erode Lok Sabha constituency that elects its member to the Parliament of India.

== Demographics ==
As per the 2011 census, Chennasamudram had a population of 8,111 individuals across 2,482 households. The population saw a marginal increase compared to the previous census in 2001 when 7,342 inhabitants were registered. The population consisted of 4,006 males and 4,105 females. About 597 individuals were below the age of six years. The entire population is classified as urban. The town has an average literacy rate of 74%. About 17.7% of the population belonged to scheduled castes.

About 60% of the eligible population were employed. Hinduism was the majority religion which was followed by 99.2% of the population, with Christianity (0.5%) and Islam (0.2%) being minor religions.
