= Kothanallur =

Kothanaloor
- town
- Location in Tamil Nadu, India
- Coordinates: 8°18′18″N 77°19′18″E
- Country: India
- State: Tamil Nadu
- District: Kanniyakumari

Population (2001)
  - Total: 15,877

Languages
  - Official: Tamil
- Time zone: UTC+5:30 (IST)
- Postal code: 629166

Kothanaloor is a panchayat town in Kanniyakumari district in the Indian state of Tamil Nadu.

== Demographics ==
As of 2001 India census, Kothanaloor had a population of 15,877. Males constitute 49% of the population and females 51%. Kothanaloor has an average literacy rate of 79%, higher than the national average of 59.5%: male literacy is 82%, and female literacy is 77%. In Kothanaloor, 10% of the population is under 6 years of age.
