= R.Pattanam =

R.Pattanam Aalathur pattanam
- Village Panchayat
- Location in Tamil Nadu, India R.Pattanam (India)
- Coordinates: 11.47197°N 78.210889°E
- Country: India
- State: Tamil Nadu
- District: Namakkal

Population
  - Total: 9,200

Languages
  - Official: Tamil
- Time zone: UTC+5:30 (IST)
- Postal code: 637408
- Website: www.rpattanam.com

R. Pattanam is a village in Rasipuram taluk, Namakkal district, Tamil Nadu, India. The residents' major occupation is agriculture. Here it has two lakes Pattanam lake which is largest lake in Rasipuram taluk and alathoor lake. Both collect the rain water through canal from the bodhamalai hills.
