= Kilampadi =

- Panchayat town
- Location in Tamil Nadu, India
- Coordinates: 11°10′44″N 77°51′17″E
- Country: India
- State: Tamil Nadu
- District: Erode

Area
  - Total: 13.87 km^{2} (5.36 sq mi)

Population (2011)
  - Total: 6,422
  - Density: 463.0/km^{2} (1,199/sq mi)

Languages
  - Official: Tamil
- Time zone: UTC+5:30 (IST)

Kilampadi is a panchayat town in Kodumudi taluk of Erode district in the Indian state of Tamil Nadu. It is located in the north-western part of the state. Spread across an area of 13.87 km^{2} (5.36 sq mi), it had a population of 6,422 individuals as per the 2011 census.

== Geography and administration ==
Kilampadi is located in Kodumudi taluk, Erode division of Erode district in the Indian state of Tamil Nadu. Spread across an area of 13.87 km^{2} (5.36 sq mi), it is one of the 42 panchayat towns in the district. It is located in the north-western part of the state.

The town panchayat is headed by a chairperson, who is elected by the members, who are chosen through direct elections. The town forms part of the Modakkurichi Assembly constituency that elects its member to the Tamil Nadu legislative assembly and the Erode Lok Sabha constituency that elects its member to the Parliament of India.

== Demographics ==
As per the 2011 census, Kilampadi had a population of 6,422 individuals. The population saw a marginal increase compared to the previous census in 2001 when 8,570 inhabitants were registered. The population consisted of 3,167 males and 3,255 females. About 505 inhabitants were under the age of six years. The entire population is classified as urban. The town has an average literacy rate of 69.1%, with male literacy rate of 80.30 % and female literacy of 58.25 %. About 24.9% of the population belonged to scheduled castes.

About 64.4% of the eligible population were employed. Hinduism was the majority religion which was followed by 96.5% of the population, with Christianity (3.1%) and Islam (0.4%) being minor religions.
