= Vanapuram =

- Panchayat town
- Location in Tamil Nadu, India
- Coordinates: 12.05°N 79.10°E
- Country: India
- State: Tamil Nadu
- District: Kallakurichi
- Taluk: Vanapuram
- Elevation: 98 m (322 ft)

Population (2001)
  - Total: 6,112

Languages
  - Official: Tamil
- Time zone: UTC+5:30 (IST)

Vanapuram is a panchayat town and Taluk in Kallakurichi district, Tamil Nadu India.
