= Thittacheri =

Thittachery
- Town
- Location in Tamil Nadu, India
- Coordinates: 10°52′14″N 79°47′48″E
- Country: India
- State: Tamil Nadu
- District: Nagapattinam

Area
  - Total: 8 km^{2} (3.1 sq mi)

Population (2011)
  - Total: 9,245
  - Density: 1,200/km^{2} (3,000/sq mi)

Languages
  - Official: Tamil
- Time zone: UTC5:30 (IST)
- ZIP Code: 609703
- Telephone code: 04365
- Vehicle registration: TN 51

Thittacheri is a town panchayat in Nagapattinam district in the Indian state of Tamil Nadu.

== Demographics ==
According to the 2011 Census of India, Thittacheri had a total population of 9,245. Males constitute 48.2% of the population, and females 51.8%. Thittacheri has an average literacy rate of 78.42%, higher than the national average of 74.04%: male literacy is 82.65%, and female literacy is 74.5%. In Thittacheri, 11.8% of the population is under 6 years of age. The town had a total of 1,985 households. Muslims are the majority of the population, and Tamil is the predominant language.

== Sports ==
In Thittachery mainly 2 games is considered as a favorite game of the people of Thittachery they are football and volleyball. There are many footballers are in Thittachery and they play for famous clubs like Chennaiyin FC, Gokulam Kerala Fc, Kerala blasters and there is a famous football club in Thittachery called Mansoor football club which is widely regarded as best club around the Nagapattinam, Thanjavur and Thiruvarur District.
