= Palapallam =

Coordinates: 8°13′27″N 77°14′23″E

- panchayat town
- Interactive map of Palapallam
- Country: India
- State: Tamil Nadu
- District: Kanniyakumari

Population (2001)
  - Total: 16,638

Languages
  - Official: Tamil
- Time zone: UTC+5:30 (IST)
- Postal code: 629159
- Vehicle registration: TN75

Palapallam is a panchayat town in Kanniyakumari district in the state of Tamil Nadu, India.

== Demographics ==
As of 2001 India census, Palappallam had a population of 16,638. Males constitute 49% of the population and females 51%. Palappallam has an average literacy rate of 77%, higher than the national average of 59.5%; with 50% of the males and 50% of females literate. 11% of the population is under 6 years of age.
