= Melachokkanathapuram =

- Town
- Location in Tamil Nadu, India Melachokkanathapuram (India)
- Coordinates: 9°59′48″N 77°17′28″E
- Country: India
- State: Tamil Nadu
- District: Theni

Population (2001)
  - Total: 11,661

Languages
  - Official: Tamil
- Time zone: UTC+5:30 (IST)

Melachokkanathapuram is a panchayat town in Theni district in the Indian state of Tamil Nadu.

== Demographics ==
As of 2001 India census, Melachokkanathapuram had a population of 11,661. Males constitute 50% of the population and females 50%. Melachokkanathapuram has an average literacy rate of 58%, lower than the national average of 59.5%: male literacy is 68%, and female literacy is 49%. In Melachokkanathapuram, 11% of the population is under 6 years of age.
