= Palani Chettipatti =

Palani Chettipatti P.C. Patti
- Village
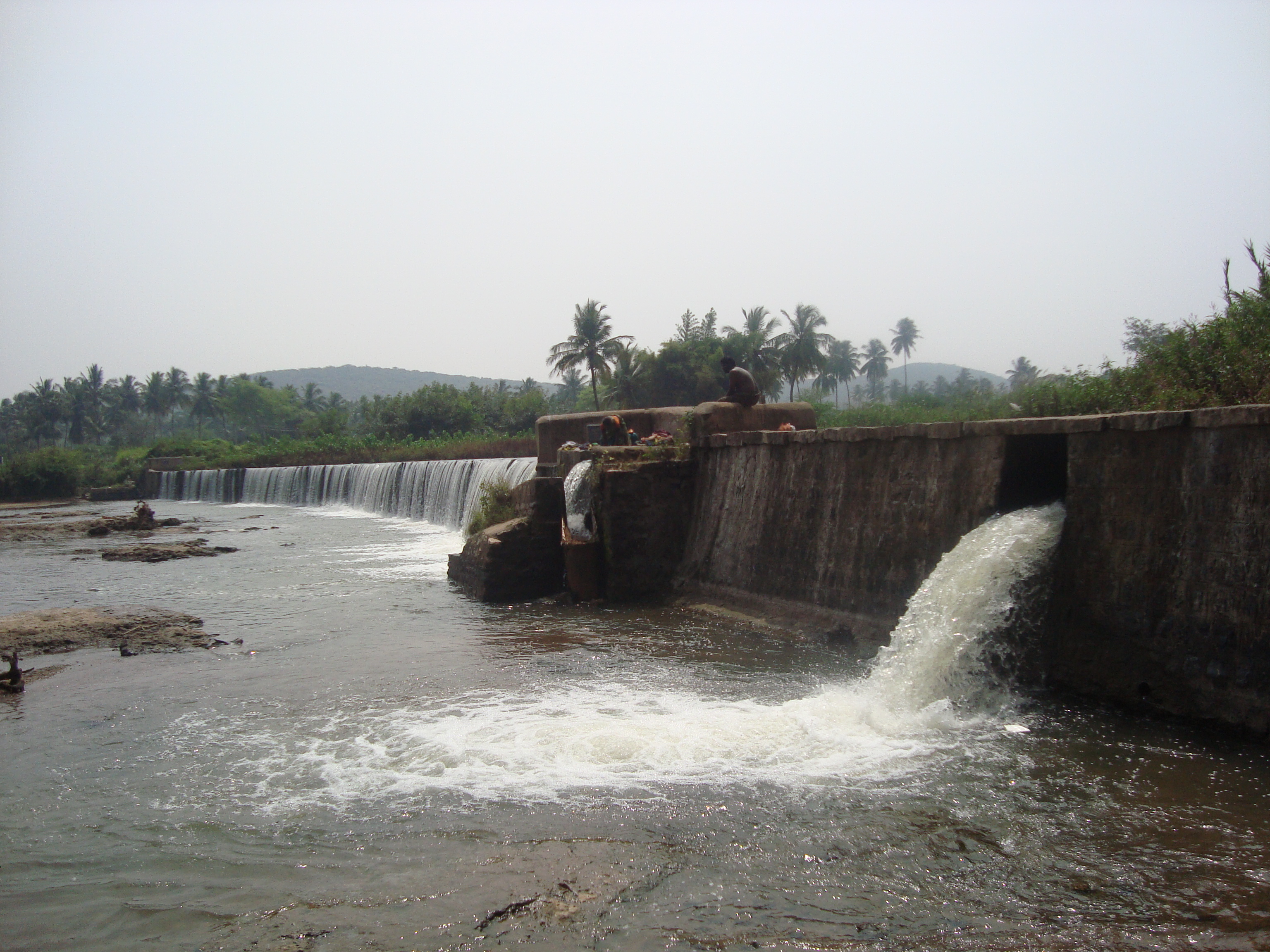
- Palanichettipatti Dam

- Location in Tamil Nadu, India
- Coordinates: 9°59′33″N 77°27′30″E
- Country: India
- State: Tamil Nadu
- District: Theni

Population (2001)
  - Total: 11,750

Languages
  - Official: Tamil
- Time zone: UTC+5:30 (IST)

Palani Chettipatti (P.C. Patti) is a panchayat grama in Theni district in the Indian state of Tamil Nadu. It is located on the road between Theni and Cumbum. The Mullai river flows via this village from Uthamapalayam and goes down the valley pin code is 625531.

== History ==
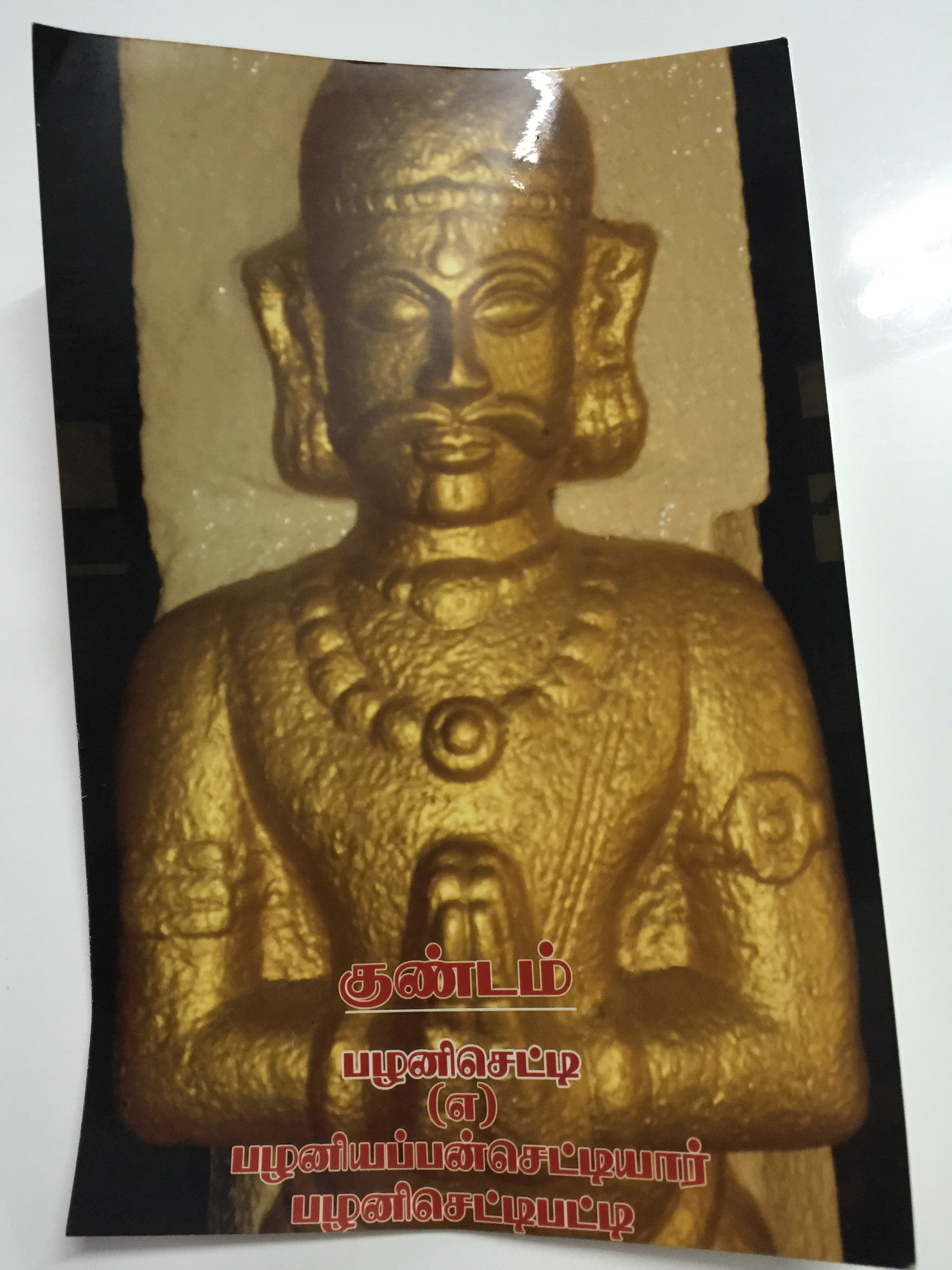
Palaniappa Chettiar

It was founded by Palaniappa Chettiar. He and his family members constructed a small dam across the suruliyar river basin in 1840–1845, when John Black Burn was the district collector and magistrate of Madurai-Ramnad Jilla well before the Mullaperiyar Dam was constructed by Colonel John PennyCuick(1895). This dam is used for the irrigation and drinking water supply for several places: Theni - Allinagaram, Palanichettipatti and some near by villages. This dam has the distinction of being the *only* privately owned dam in Tamil Nadu. The founder, Palaniappa Chettiar, was one of the biggest contributors to the construction of the Mullaperiyar Dam.

== Demographics ==
As of 2001 India census, Palani Chettipatti had a population of 11,750. Males constitute 51% of the population and females 49%. Palani Chettipatti has an average literacy rate of 75%, higher than the national average of 59.5%: male literacy is 80%, and female literacy is 68%. In Palani Chettipatti, 12% of the population is under 6 years.

== Education ==
=== Schools ===
A Government Aided School, Palaniappa Memorial Higher Secondary School provides low cost education to thousands of students in the nearby rural areas.

- Benedict Matriculation Higher Secondary School
- Palaniappa Vidyalaya
- Bose Primary
