= Sankarapuram, Kallakurichi district =

Town in Tamil Nadu, India

Sankarapuram
- Town
- Location in Tamil Nadu, India Sankarapuram (India)
- Coordinates: 11°53′8.7534″N 78°54′40.122″E
- Country: India
- State: Tamil Nadu
- District: Kallakurichi
- Taluk: Sankarapuram

Area
  - Total: 30.0 km^{2} (11.60 sq mi)

Population (2011)
  - Total: 15,664
  - Density: 521.4/km^{2} (1,350/sq mi)

Languages
  - Official: Tamil
- Time zone: UTC+5:30 (IST)
- Postal code: 606401
- Vehicle registration: TN-15
- Website: www.townpanchayat.in/sankarapuram

Sankarapuram is a panchayat town in Kallakurichi district in the Indian state of Tamil Nadu.

== Geography ==
Sankarapuram is located in the Kallakurichi district. Thirukovilur lies 35 km to the east, Kalvarayanmalai is 35 km to the west, Thiruvannamalai is situated 47 km to the north, and Kallakurichi is 18 km away.

== Structure of panchayat town ==
Spanning across 11.60 square kilometers, this town panchayat has 15 councilors and encompasses 41 streets. It falls within the Sankarapuram Assembly constituency and is part of the Kallakurichi Lok Sabha constituency.

== Demography ==
As of 2011 census, the town panchayat has 3,539 households and a population of 15,664. Also, the town panchayat has a literacy rate of 79.8% and a sex ratio of 1,004 females to 1,000 males. The sex ratio of children under 6 years is 935 girls per 1000 boys. Scheduled Castes and Scheduled Tribes are 2,304 and 87 respectively.
