= Pandamangalam =

- Town Panchayat
- Location in Tamil Nadu, India
- Coordinates: 11.06°N 77.58°E
- Country: India
- State: Tamil Nadu
- District: Namakkal

Area
  - Total: 5 km^{2} (1.9 sq mi)

Population (2011)
  - Total: 7,259
  - Density: 1,500/km^{2} (3,800/sq mi)

Languages
  - Official: Tamil
- Time zone: UTC+5:30 (IST)
- Postal code: 637208
- Vehicle registration: TN 88

Pandamangalam is a panchayat town in Paramathi-Velur taluk of Namakkal district in the Indian state of Tamil Nadu. Spread across an area of 5 km^{2} (1.9 sq mi), the town panchayat is divided into 15 wards. It had a population of 7,259 as per the 2011 census.

== Geography and administration ==
Pandamangalam is a town panchayat in Paramathi-Velur taluk of Namakkal district in the Indian state of Tamil Nadu. It is located about 30 km (19 mi) southwest of Namakkal, in the northern bank of Kaveri river. The town panchayat covers an area of 5 km^{2} (1.9 sq mi) and is divided into 15 wards and 54 streets. The panchayat administration is responsible for providing basic services including maintenance of roads, water supply, health and sanitation. Pandamangalam forms part of the Paramathi-Velur Assembly constituency of the Tamil Nadu Legislative Assembly and the Namakkal Lok Sabha constituency.

== Demographics and economy ==
According to the 2011 census, Pandamangalam had a population of 7,259 across 2,387 households. The population consisted of 3,645 males and 3,614 females. About 600 (8.27%) of the population were children aged less than six years. The town panchayat had a literacy rate of approximately 80.5%. Scheduled Castes accounted for approximately 10.4% of the population.

As per the 2011 census, Hinduism was the predominant religion, practiced by 98.6% of the population, followed by Islam (1.2%). The town panchayat has a temple in ward number 15. The annual festival at the Prasanna Venkataramanaswamy Temple, dedicated to Vishnu, is celebrated in January.

The town panchayat is known for its betel leaf production. There is a firecracker manufacturing unit in the town panchayat. In May 2026, the state government proposed to build a barrage across the Kaveri river, which would inundate part of the land belonging to the town panchayat.

== Transport ==
Pandamangalam is located on the road connecting Paramathi-Velur and Tiruchirappalli. Public bus services connect the town with nearby urban centres, including Tiruchengode, Namakkal, Karur, and Salem. The nearest railway station is the Pugalur railway station located approximately 10 km (6.2 mi) away and the nearest airport is the Tiruchirappalli International Airport, approximately 88 km (55 mi) away.
