= Kollankoil =

kandasamypalayamKollankoil
- Panchayat town
- Location in Tamil Nadu, India
- Coordinates: 11°7′54″N 77°44′37″E
- Country: India
- State: Tamil Nadu
- District: Erode

Area
  - Total: 12.12 km^{2} (4.68 sq mi)

Population (2011)
  - Total: 9,196
  - Density: 758.7/km^{2} (1,965/sq mi)

Languages
  - Official: Tamil
- Time zone: UTC+5:30 (IST)

KANDASAMYPALAYAM Kollankoil is a panchayat town in Kodumudi taluk of Erode district in the Indian state of Tamil Nadu. It is located in the north-western part of the state. Spread across an area of 12.12 km^{2} (4.68 sq mi), it had a population of 9,196 individuals as per the 2011 census.

== Geography and administration ==
KANDASAMYPALAYAM kollankovil located in Kodumudi taluk, Erode division of Erode district in the Indian state of Tamil Nadu. Spread across an area of 12.12 km^{2} (4.68 sq mi), it is one of the 42 panchayat towns in the district. It is located in the north-western part of the state.

The town panchayat is headed by a chairperson, who is elected by the members, who are chosen through direct elections. The town forms part of the Modakkurichi Assembly constituency that elects its member to the Tamil Nadu legislative assembly and the Erode Lok Sabha constituency that elects its member to the Parliament of India.

== Demographics ==
As per the 2011 census, Kollankoil had a population of 9,196 individuals. The population saw a marginal increase compared to the previous census in 2001 when 8,574 inhabitants were registered. The population consisted of 4,617 males and 4,579 females. About 677 inhabitants were under the age of six years. The entire population is classified as urban. The town has an average literacy rate of 71.6%, with male literacy rate of 80.39 % and female literacy of 62.75 %. About 16.3% of the population belonged to scheduled castes.

About 61.4% of the eligible population were employed. Hinduism was the majority religion which was followed by 98.1% of the population, with Christianity (1.3%) and Islam (0.4%) being minor religions.
