= Govindavadi =

- village
- Location in Tamil Nadu, India Govindavadi (India)
- Coordinates: 12.948478°N 79.66778°E
- Country: India
- State: Tamil Nadu

Languages
  - Official: Tamil
- Time zone: UTC+5:30 (IST)

Govindavadi is a small village near Kancheepuram temple town in Kancheepuram district in Tamil Nadu, India. Kancheepuram is about 100 km from Chennai and is known for its silk sarees. It is also known as Agaram or Govindavadi Agaram. Tirumalpur is the nearby railway station accessible by electric trains which run from Chennai Beach station everyday
