= Kappiyarai =

- Town
- Location in Tamil Nadu, India
- Coordinates: 8°14′54″N 77°15′45″E
- Country: India
- State: Tamil Nadu
- District: Kanniyakumari

Population (2001)
  - Total: 13,475

Languages
  - Official: Tamil
- Time zone: UTC+5:30 (IST)

Kappiyarai is a panchayat town in Kanniyakumari district in the Indian state of Tamil Nadu.

== Demographics ==
As of 2001 India census, Kappiyarai had a population of 13,475. Males constitute 50% of the population and females 50%. Kappiyarai has an average literacy rate of 82%, higher than the national average of 59.5%: male literacy is 84%, and female literacy is 80%. In Kappiyarai, 9% of the population is under 6 years of age.

== Religious ==
Churches present in Kappiyarai are St.Catherine Church, The Salvation Army Church, Full Gospel Pentecostal Church, CSI Church and JCC Church
