= Boothipuram =

- town
- Location in Tamil Nadu, India Boothipuram (India)
- Coordinates: 10°0′6″N 77°27′3″E
- Country: India
- State: Tamil Nadu
- District: Theni

Population (2001)
  - Total: 9,623

Languages
  - Official: Tamil
- Time zone: UTC+5:30 (IST)

Boothipuram is a panchayat town in Theni district in the state of Tamil Nadu, India.

== Demographics ==
Religious census
| Religion | Percent(%) |
| Hindu | 99.00% |
| Muslim | 0.00% |
| Christian | 1.00% |
| Other | 0.00% |

As of 2001 India census, Boothipuram had a population of 9623. Males constitute 51% of the population and females 49%. Boothipuram has an average literacy rate of 60%, higher than the national average of 59.5%; with male literacy of 69% and female literacy of 50%. 12% of the population is under 6 years of age.

It consists of 15 wards with 2 small villages (Vaalaiyathu patti, Aathi patti).

== Schools ==
- Government Higher Secondary School, Boothipuram
- Government Elementary School, Boothipuram
- Kallar Middle School, Boothipuram
- Kalaimagal English Schools, Boothipuram
- Devi Kalakendra English Schools, Boothipuram

== Major festivals ==
- Varatharaja perumal (Vaikunda Aagathesi)
- Urkavalappan kovil (Periya Kumbudu), (Maddu Pongal, January 15)
- Sannasiyapan kovil (Tamil New Year)
- Kowmariyamman kovil (Chithirai pongal)
- Kaaliyamman kovil festival

== Water Resources ==
- Kottakudi river
- Vaalaiyar river
- Raja Bobalasamuthiram pond
