= Seerapalli =

- Town Panchayat
- Location in Tamil Nadu, India
- Coordinates: 11°29′30″N 78°14′39″E
- Country: India
- State: Tamil Nadu
- District: Namakkal

Area
  - Total: 6 km^{2} (2.3 sq mi)

Population (2011)
  - Total: 12,403
  - Density: 2,100/km^{2} (5,400/sq mi)

Languages
  - Official: Tamil
- Time zone: UTC+5:30 (IST)
- Postal code: 638008

Seerapalli is a town panchayat in Sendamangalam taluk of Namakkal district in the Indian state of Tamil Nadu. It is located along the road connecting Rasipuram and Attur. Spread across an area of 6 km^{2} (2.3 sq mi), the town panchayat is divided into 15 wards. It had a population of 12,0403 as per the 2011 census.

== Geography and administration ==
Seerapalli is a town panchayat in Rasipuram taluk of Namakkal district in the Indian state of Tamil Nadu. It is located along the road connecting Rasipuram and Attur, about 7 km (4.3 mi) from Rasipuram. The town panchayat covers an area of 5.63 km^{2} (2.17 sq mi) and is divided into 15 wards and 32 streets.

It is classified as a first grade (Grade - I) town panchayat (annual revenue between ₹ 5 to 10 million), and the panchayat administration is responsible for providing basic services including maintenance of roads, water supply, health and sanitation. Seerapalli forms part of the Sendamangalam Assembly constituency of the Tamil Nadu Legislative Assembly and the Namakkal Lok Sabha constituency.

== Demographics and economy ==
According to the 2011 census, Seerapalli had a population of 12,403 across 3,344 households. The population consisted of 6,250 males and 6,153 females. About 1,059 (8.5%) of the population were children aged less than six years. The town panchayat had a literacy rate of approximately 73.5%, with male literacy at 80.7% and female literacy at 66.3%. Scheduled Castes accounted for approximately 43.1% of the population, while Scheduled Tribes accounted for 0.3%.

As per the 2011 census, Hinduism was the predominant religion, practiced by 99.3% of the population, followed by Islam (0.4%) and Christianity (0.2%). There are two Hindu temples and the annual temple festival is held in April.

Agriculture is the major occupation in the town panchayat. The working population constituted approximately 51.6% of the total population, comprising 6,404 workers, of whom 4,018 were males and 2,386 were females. Of the total working population, 96.2% were engaged in main work, while 3.8% were engaged in marginal work.
