= Markayankottai =

- Town
- Location in Tamil Nadu, India Markayankottai (India)
- Coordinates: 9°51′29″N 77°22′02″E
- Country: India
- State: Tamil Nadu
- District: Theni

Population (2011)
  - Total: 6,509

Languages
  - Official: Tamil
- Time zone: UTC+5:30 (IST)

Markayankottai is a panchayat town in Theni district in the Indian state of Tamil Nadu.

== Demographics ==
As of 2011 India census, Markayankottai had a population of 6509. Males constitute 50% of the population and females 50%. Markayankottai has an average literacy rate of 76%, higher than the national average of 79.5%: male literacy is 86%, and female literacy is 75%.
