= Vengampudur =

- Panchayat town
- Location in Tamil Nadu, India
- Coordinates: 11°6′5″N 77°53′25″E
- Country: India
- State: Tamil Nadu
- District: Erode

Area
  - Total: 17.1 km^{2} (6.6 sq mi)

Population (2011)
  - Total: 7,443
  - Density: 435/km^{2} (1,130/sq mi)

Languages
  - Official: Tamil
- Time zone: UTC+5:30 (IST)

Vengampudur is a panchayat town in Erode taluk of Erode district in the Indian state of Tamil Nadu. It is located in the north-western part of the state. Spread across an area of 17.1 km^{2} (6.6 sq mi), it had a population of 7,443 individuals as per the 2011 census.

== Geography and administration ==
Vengampudur is located in Erode taluk, Erode division of Erode district in the Indian state of Tamil Nadu. Spread across an area of 17.1 km^{2} (6.6 sq mi), it is one of the 42 panchayat towns in the district. It is located in the north-western part of the state.

Vengampudur panchayat is headed by a chairperson, who is elected by the members, who are chosen through direct elections. The town forms part of the Modakkurichi Assembly constituency that elects its member to the Tamil Nadu legislative assembly and the Erode Lok Sabha constituency that elects its member to the Parliament of India.

== Demographics ==
As per the 2011 census, Vengampudur had a population of 7,443 individuals across 2,381 households. The population saw a marginal decrease compared to the previous census in 2001 when 7,632 inhabitants were registered. The population consisted of 3,672 males and 3,771 females. About 510 individuals were below the age of six years. The entire population is classified as urban. The town has an average literacy rate of 76.2%. About 13.5% of the population belonged to scheduled castes.

About 66.4% of the eligible population were employed with majority involved in agriculture and allied activities. Hinduism was the majority religion which was followed by 90.6% of the population, with Islam (9.2%) and Christianity (0.2%) being minor religions.
