= Nerkuppai =

- Village
- Location in Tamil Nadu, India
- Coordinates: 10°14′09″N 78°32′40″E
- Country: India
- State: Tamil Nadu
- District: Sivaganga

Population (2001)
  - Total: 5,691

Languages
  - Official: Tamil
- Time zone: UTC+5:30 (IST)

Nerkuppai is a panchayat town in Sivaganga district in the Indian state of Tamil Nadu. This is one of the 76 villages of chettinad. The villages and towns near nerkuppai are valayapatti, kadukapatti, Ponnamaravathi

== Demographics ==
Current estimated population of Nerkuppai Town Panchayat in 2026 is approximately 10,400.The Nerkuppai Town Panchayat has population of 7,165 of which 3,623 are males while 3,542 are females as per report released by Census India 2011. Population of Children with age of 0-6 is 779 which is 10.87 % of total population of Nerkuppai (TP). In Nerkuppai Town Panchayat, Female Sex Ratio is of 978 against state average of 996. Moreover Child Sex Ratio in Nerkuppai is around 824 compared to Tamil Nadu state average of 943. Literacy rate of Nerkuppai city is 71.42 % lower than state average of 80.09 %. In Nerkuppai, Male literacy is around 81.98 % while female literacy rate is 60.85 %.
