= Ammapettai, Erode =

Ammapettai
- Panchayat town
- Location in Tamil Nadu, India
- Coordinates: 11.58°N 77.7°E
- Country: India
- State: Tamil Nadu
- District: Erode

Area
  - Total: 13.66 km^{2} (5.27 sq mi)
- Elevation: 1 m (3.3 ft)

Population (2011)
  - Total: 9,677
  - Density: 708.4/km^{2} (1,835/sq mi)

Languages
  - Official: Tamil
- Time zone: UTC+5:30 (IST)

Ammapettai is a panchayat town in Anthiyur taluk of Erode district in the Indian state of Tamil Nadu. It is located in the north-western part of the state. Spread across an area of 13.66 km^{2} (5.27 sq mi), it had a population of 9,677 individuals as per the 2011 census.

== Geography and administration ==
Ammapettai is located in Anthiyur taluk, Gobichettipalayam division of Erode district in the Indian state of Tamil Nadu. It is located at 11.58°N 77.7°E. Spread across an area of 13.66 km^{2} (5.27 sq mi), it is one of the 42 panchayat towns in the district. It is located in the north-western part of the state towards the southern end of the Indian peninsula.

The town panchayat is headed by a chairperson, who is elected by the members, who are chosen through direct elections. The town forms part of the Anthiyur Assembly constituency that elects its member to the Tamil Nadu legislative assembly and the Tiruppur Lok Sabha constituency that elects its member to the Parliament of India.

== Demographics ==
As per the 2011 census, Ammapettai had a population of 9,677 individuals across 2,758 households. The population increased compared to the previous census in 2001, when 9,259 inhabitants were registered. The population consisted of 4,879 males and 4,798 females. About 857 individuals were below the age of six years. The entire population is classified as urban. Ammapettai has an average literacy rate of 69.9%. About 20.3% of the population belonged to scheduled castes.

About 57.3% of the eligible population was employed. Nearly 61% of the population was employed in agriculture and allied activities. Hinduism was the majority religion which was followed by 93.8% of the population, with Christianity (3.7%) and Islam (2.3%) being minor religions.

== Demographics ==
As of 2001 India census, Ammapettai had a population of 8991. Males constitute 51% of the population and females 49%. Ammapettai has an average literacy rate of 54%, lower than the national average of 59.5%; with 60% of the males and 40% of females literate. 10% of the population is under 6 years of age. Ammapettai lies on the banks of the Kaveri river, and the arterial road connecting Erode and Mettur passes through the heart of the village.
