= Highwavys =

Town in Tamil Nadu, India

Coordinates: 9°38′0″N 77°21′0″E

Highwavys

Highwavys is a Town Panchayat located in the Western Ghats near Chinnamanur, Theni District, Tamil Nadu, India, at an altitude of 1500 meters above sea level. The villages under this Town Panchayat are Meghamalai, Manalaru, Uppermanalaru, Venniaru, Maharajanmettu, Iravangalaru. Cash crops such as tea, coffee and pepper are cultivated in this area. More than 10 thousand plantation workers live in these areas. A mountain road with 18 needle bends was built during the British period from Thenpalani to Highwavys village located at its foothills.

== Demography ==
The Town Panchayat, as per the 2011 census, has a population of 4,882, an area of 46.82 km^{2}, 15 wards and 15 streets. The municipality falls under Andipatti Assembly constituency and Theni Lok Sabha constituency. Transport facilities Buses are available from Theni via Chinnamanur, Meghamalai to Highwavys which is 55 km from Theni.
