= Pazhugal =

Palukal
- Town
- Palukal
- Location in Tamil Nadu, India
- Coordinates: 8°22′34″N 77°10′19″E
- Country: India
- State: Tamil Nadu
- District: Kanniyakumari

Government
  - Type: Democratic
  - Body: Town Panchayath

Area
  - Total: 8.8 km^{2} (3.4 sq mi)

Population (2011)
  - Total: 18,276

Languages
  - Official: Tamil, Malayalam
- Time zone: UTC+5:30 (IST)
- Postal code: 629170
- Vehicle registration: TN 75

Palukal is a panchayat town in Kanniyakumari district in the Indian state of Tamil Nadu.kannumamoodu a Major Trade Centre of Palukal Town.

== Demographics ==
As of 2001 India census, Pazhugal had a population of 17,302. Males constitute 49% of the population and females 51%. Pazhugal has an average literacy rate of 77%, higher than the national average of 74.04%: male literacy is 79%, and female literacy is 74%. In Pazhugal, 12% of the population is under the age of six.
