= Vilavur =

- panchayat town
- Location in Tamil Nadu, India
- Coordinates: 8.255°N 77.353°E
- Country: India
- State: Tamil Nadu
- District: Kanniyakumari

Population (2001)
  - Total: 13,373

Languages
  - Official: Tamil
- Time zone: UTC+5:30 (IST)

Vilavur is a panchayat town in Kanniyakumari district in the Indian state of Tamil Nadu.Nearest Airport Thiruvananthapuram(KERALA)

== Demographics ==
As of 2001 India census, Vilavur had a population of 13,373. Males constitute 48% of the population and females 52%. Vilavur has an average literacy rate of 79%, higher than the national average of 59.5%: male literacy is 83%, and female literacy is 76%. In Vilavur, 11% of the population is under 6 years of age.
