= Pacode =

- Town
- Location in Tamil Nadu, India
- Coordinates: 8°19′57″N 77°13′52″E
- Country: India
- State: Tamil Nadu
- District: Kanniyakumari

Population (2011)
  - Total: 24,050
- Time zone: UTC+5:30 (IST)
- Postal code: 629 168

Pacode is a panchayat town in Kanniyakumari district in the Indian state of Tamil Nadu.

== Demographics ==
As of 2001 India census, Pacode had a population of 22,521. Males constituted 51% of the population and females 49%. Pacode had an average literacy rate of 76%, higher than the national average of 59.5%: male literacy was 79%, and female literacy was 72%. In Pacode, 11% of the population was under 6 years of age.

== Important places ==
Gnaramvilai, Thickurichy, Alauvilai, and Melpuram, Chitharal Jain Monuments are important places in Pacode.

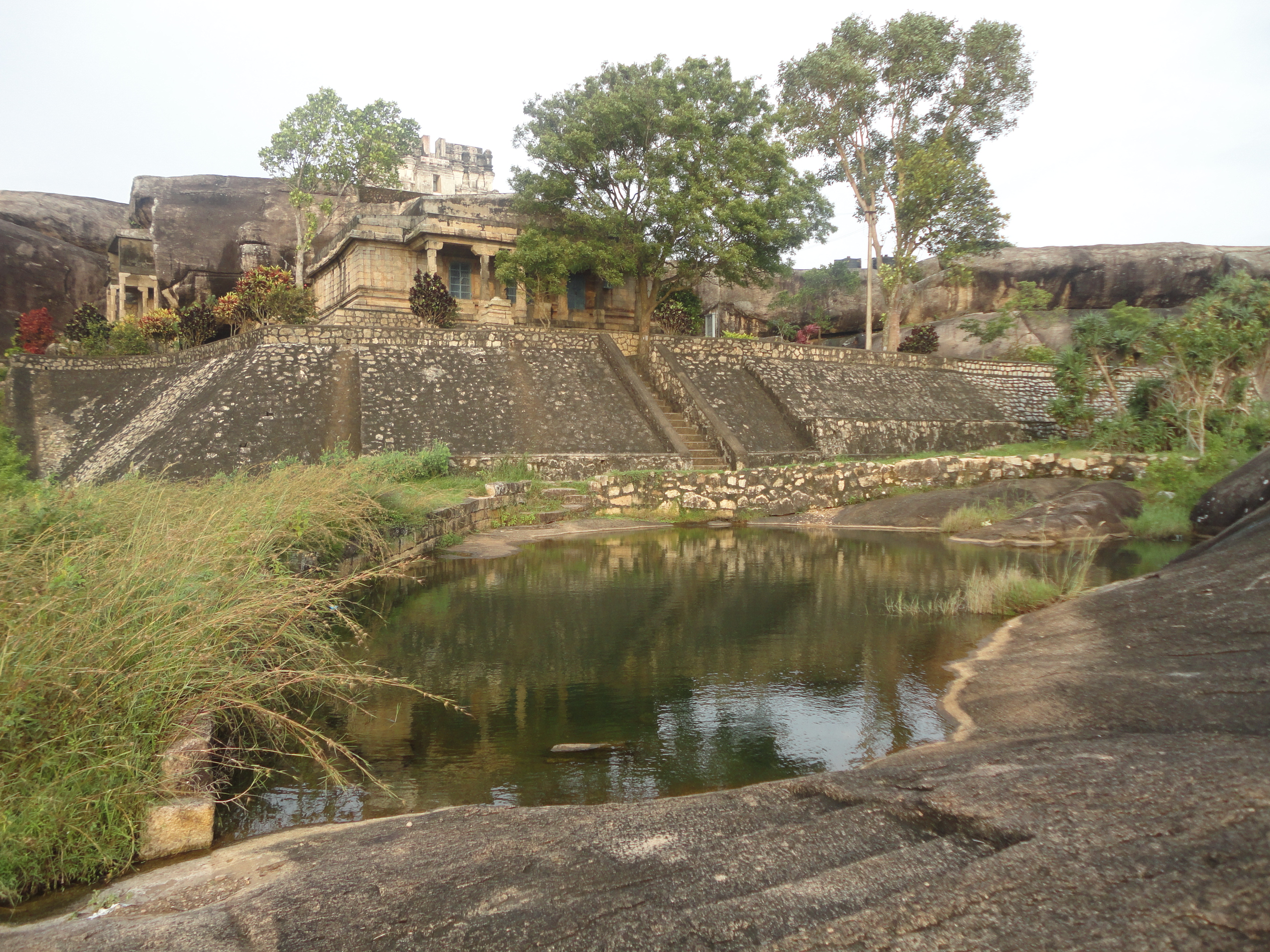
Chitharal Jain temple1

== Schools ==
- Abraham James Memorial Matriculation School, Gnaramvilai, Pacode
- Sacred Heart Higher Secondary School, Pacode

== Religion ==
There are several temples and churches here.
