= Alampalayam =

Alampalayam Aalampalayam
- Town panchayat
- Location in Tamil Nadu, India
- Coordinates: 11°21′49″N 77°45′33″E
- Country: India
- State: Tamil Nadu
- District: Namakkal
- Taluk: Tiruchengode

Government
  - Body: Town panchayat

Area
  - Total: 10.32 km^{2} (3.98 sq mi)

Population (2011)
  - Total: 20,286
  - Density: 1,966/km^{2} (5,091/sq mi)

Languages
  - Official: Tamil
- Time zone: UTC+5:30 (IST)
- PIN: 638008

Alampalayam is a town panchayat in Tiruchengode taluk of Namakkal district in the Indian state of Tamil Nadu. It is located about 7 km (4.3 mi) west of Erode along the highway connecting Erode and Tiruchengode. Spread across an area of 10.32 km^{2} (3.98 sq mi), the town panchayat is divided into 15 wards. It had a population of 20,286 as per the 2011 census.

== Geography and administration ==
Alampalayam is located in Tiruchengode taluk of Namakkal district in the Indian state of Tamil Nadu. The town panchayat covers an area of 10.32 km^{2} (3.98 sq mi) and is divided into 15 wards. It is classified as a selection grade town panchayat.

Alampalayam forms part of the Kumarapalayam Assembly constituency of the Tamil Nadu Legislative Assembly and the Erode Lok Sabha constituency.

== Demographics ==
According to the 2011 census, Alampalayam had a population of 20,286 across 5,785 households. The population consisted of 10,264 males and 10,022 females, with a sex ratio of 976 females per 1,000 males. About 1,926 (9.5%) of the population were children aged less than six years. The town had a literacy rate of 68.1% with male literacy at 74.6% and female literacy at 61.4%.Scheduled Castes accounted for 6.6% of the population, while Scheduled Tribes accounted for 0.1%.

As per the 2011 census, Hinduism was the predominant religion, practiced by 95.7% of the population, followed by Christianity at 2.4% and Islam at 1.8%.

== Economy ==
Agriculture and weaving are the principal occupations in the town panchayat.

== Transport and infrastructure ==
Alampalayam is located about 7 km (4.3 mi) west of Erode on the highway connecting Erode and Tiruchengode. A 3.5 km (2.2 mi) long flyover was constructed at a cost of ₹3.1 billion (equivalent to ₹3.3 billion or US$34 million in 2026) connecting Alampalayam with Pallipalayam in 2024. The state highways department completed the four-laning of the Thokkavadi–Alampalayam road section, which was opened for traffic in November 2023. The nearest railway station is Cauvery railway station, located about 4 km (2.5 mi) from the town panchayat.

Under the Pradhan Mantri Awas Yojana, the construction of 139 houses were sanctioned for the town panchayat in 2017. A Combined Water Supply Scheme was implemented by the Tamil Nadu Water Supply and Drainage Board covering 669 rural areas including Alampalayam at an estimated cost of ₹4 billion (equivalent to ₹4.6 billion or US$48 million in 2026) in 2022.
