= Thenkarai, Theni =

Coordinates: 10°06′02″N 77°30′48″E

Thenkarai
- panchayat grama
- Interactive map of Thenkarai
- Country: India
- State: Tamil Nadu
- District: Theni

Population (2001)
  - Total: 11,616

Languages
  - Official: Tamil
- Time zone: UTC+5:30 (IST)

Thenkarai is a panchayat grama in Theni district in the Indian state of Tamil Nadu.

== Demographics ==
As of 2001 India census, Thenkarai had a population of 11,616. Males constitute 51% of the population and females 49%. Thenkarai has an average literacy rate of 56%, lower than the national average of 59.5%: male literacy is 66%, and female literacy is 46%. In Thenkarai, 11% of the population is under 6 years of age.
