= Pudukadai =

- Town
- Location in Tamil Nadu, India
- Coordinates: 8°15′51″N 77°12′28″E
- Country: India
- State: Tamil Nadu
- District: Kanniyakumari

Population (2001)
  - Total: 9,012

Languages
  - Official: Tamil
- Time zone: UTC+5:30 (IST)
- Postal code: 629171

Pudukadai is a panchayat town in Kanniyakumari district in the Indian state of Tamil Nadu.

== Demographics ==
As of 2001 India census, Pudukadai had a population of 9012. Males constitute 51% of the population and females 49%. Pudukadai has an average literacy rate of 78%, higher than the national average of 59.5%: male literacy is 82%, and female literacy is 74%. In Pudukadai, 11% of the population is under 6 years of age.
