= Varadarajanpettai =

Coordinates: 11°22′06″N 79°25′49″E

Varadarajanpet
- panchayat town
- Interactive map of Varadarajanpet
- Country: India
- State: Tamil Nadu
- District: Ariyalur

Population (2001)
  - Total: 8,574

Languages
  - Official: Tamil
- Time zone: UTC+5:30 (IST)

Varadarajanpet is a panchayat town in Ariyalur district in the Indian state of Tamil Nadu.

== Demographics ==
As of 2001 India census, Varadarajanpettai had a population of 8574. Males constitute 44% of the population and females 56%. Varadarajanpettai has an average literacy rate of 69%, higher than the national average of 59.5%: male literacy is 71%, and female literacy is 66%. In Varadarajanpettai, 12% of the population is under 6 years of age. There are 5 schools and a college: including 2 higher secondary schools, 1 matriculation school and 2 elementary schools. There Don Bosco higher secondary school had completed golden jubilee.
