= Gangaikondan, Cuddalore district =

Town in Tamil Nadu, India

Gangaikondan is a town panchayat in Cuddalore District, Tamil Nadu, India.

== Geography ==
Cuddalore is 45 km east of Gangaikondan town panchayat on the Cuddalore-Virudhachalam National Highway; Vriddhachalam is 18 km in the west; Chidambaram is 40 km to the north and NLC India Limited is 10 km to the south.

== Structure of panchayat town ==
Spread over 19.50 km^{2}, this has 15 councilors and 25 streets and falls under Bhuvanagiri Assembly constituency and Chidambaram Lok Sabha constituency.

== Demographics ==
As of 2011 census, the town panchayat has 1,620 households and a population of 6,434. Also, the municipality has a literacy rate of 88% and a sex ratio of 987 females per 1,000 males. Scheduled Castes and Scheduled Tribes are 609 and 39 respectively.
