= Athanur =

- Panchayath town
- Location in Tamil Nadu, India
- Coordinates: 11°30′1″N 78°8′11″E
- Country: India
- State: Tamil Nadu
- District: Namakkal

Population (2001)
  - Total: 9,014

Languages
  - Official: Tamil
- Time zone: UTC+5:30 (IST)
- Postal code: 636301

Athanur is a panchayat town and suburbs of Salem city in Namakkal district in the state of Tamil Nadu, India.

== Demographics ==
As of 2001 India census, Athanur had a population of 9014. Males constitute 51% of the population and females 49%. Athanur has an average literacy rate of 55%, lower than the national average of 59.5%; with 59% of the males and 41% of females literate. 11% of the population is under 6 years of age.
