= Perumagalur =

Perumagalur Perumagalur
- Town Panchayat
- Interactive map of Perumagalur
- Coordinates: 10.178806°N 79.198803°E
- Country: India
- State: Tamil Nadu
- District: Thanjavur

Population (2011)
  - Total: 5,604

Languages
  - Official: Tamil
- Time zone: UTC+5:30 (IST)
- Postal code: 614612
- Website: https://www.perumagalur.in

Perumagalur is a panchayat town in Thanjavur district in the Indian state of Tamil Nadu.

== Etymology ==
According to history, the name Perumagalur is because of The King Raja Raja Cholan given as a dowry for her elder daughter's marriage.

== Landmarks ==
In 2016, 11 Panchaloha Statues (பஞ்சலோகம், ஐம்பொன்(aimpon) found near to the famous Somanathan temple.

The Somanathan Temple in Perumagalur is a very ancient one. The moolavar in the temple is ' Svayambu' and His consort is Sundarambigai

In Perumagalur a temple dedicated to Lord Subramania is located and a 13-day Panguni Uthira Thiruvila is celebrated every year with great fanfare and joy.

There is a big lake named, ' Periya Kulam' which has two catchment canals ( Vaithalais, Therku Vaithalai and Vadakku Vaithali). This lake when filled up every year supports the irrigation for the entire village.

== Geography ==
Perumagalur Town Panchayat is a cluster of 14 small villages surrounding the main Perumagalur village.

Perumagalur Town Panchayat has total administration over 1,536 houses to which it supplies basic amenities like water and sewerage. It is also authorized to build roads within Perumagalur Town Panchayat limits and impose taxes on properties coming under its jurisdiction.

It is named as thaai graamam for the nearby villages in and around there. Mettur dam water is mainly used for irrigation facility where agriculture is the source of living and income for the people in this village.

== Transport ==
There are frequent transport facilities available to nearby villages, kattumavidi, Trichy, Pattukottai, Thanjavur.
