= Kilkulam =

Keezhkulam Keezhkulam
- town
- Location in Tamil Nadu, India
- Coordinates: 8°19′23″N 77°12′03″E
- Country: India
- State: Tamil Nadu
- District: Kanniyakumari

Population (2001)
  - Total: 17,352

Languages
  - Official: Tamil
- Time zone: UTC+5:30 (IST)
- Postal code: 629193

Keezhkulam is a panchayat town in Kanniyakumari district in the India state of Tamil Nadu.

== Demographics ==
As of the 2001 India census, Keezhkulam is shown to have a population of 17,352 with 51% of the population male and 49% female.

According to the information gathered in 2001, Keezhkulam had an average literacy rate of 79%, which is higher than the Indian national average of 59.5%. Male literacy was at 79% and female literacy was at 72%. Also according to the census, 11% of the population was under 6 years of age.
