= Melathiruppanthuruthi =

Melathiruppanthuruthi Poonthai
- Town panchayat
- Nickname: MTT
- Location in Tamil Nadu, India
- Coordinates: 10.865887°N 79.079075°E
- Country: India
- State: Tamil Nadu
- District: Thanjavur

Population (2011)
  - Total: 9,074

Languages
  - Official: Tamil
- Time zone: UTC+5:30 (IST)
- Postal code: 613103

Melathiruppanthuruthi is a panchayat town in Thanjavur district in the Indian state of Tamil Nadu.South India's Cleanest town panchayat and best in Solid waste management in south zone awarded by central government of India (swachh survekshan) 2019-2020 (under 25000 population category).

== Geography ==
Melathiruppanthuruthi(MTT) is located in latitude and longitude of 10.865887,79.079075. keela thiruppanthruthi in the east and Thiruvalam pozhil in the west side and Kudamurutti river in the south side. Kudamurutti river water is the major sources for Drinking, agriculture and other uses for the entire village.

=== Geology ===
Melathiruppanthuruthi is situated in the bank of Kudamurutti river, a tributary of the Kaveri, is one of the five sacred rivers flows between Thiruvaiyaru and Thanjavur District. Soil is fertile and highly suited for cultivation. Most of the population are depend upon farming as regular income .

== Demographics ==
=== Population ===
As of 2019 India census, Melathiruppanthuruthi had a population of 25000. Males constitute 47.43% of the population and females 52.56%. Melathiruppanthuruthi has an average literacy rate of 72%, higher than the national average of 59.5%: male literacy is 78%, and female literacy is 66%. In Melathiruppanthuruthi, 13% of the population is under 6 years of age.

== Government and politics ==
=== Civic Utility / Amenities / Services ===
1. Cleanest town panchayat in 2019-2020 (swachh survekshan- 2020- south zone) awarded by central government of India
2. South India's best and Tamil Nadu No: 01 position in Solid waste Management system in the year 2020 (For reference: swachh survekshan- 2020- south zone).
3. Electric vehicles are used for collection of waste from entire area.
4. Segregation of waste while collecting such as Compostable (Paper, wooden pieces, etc.) and non compostable materials (plastic related) and Green (leaves, branches, shrubs, etc.)
5. Zero cost plant- Town panchayat itself giving plant to each and every homes free of cost to make our locality more green.
6. Zero plastics - shops, market, grocery are using only decomposable bags and intimate them to avoid using of plastics.
7. Indian Bank ATM and CUB ATM was available in main road of MTT and HP petrol station available 1.5 km from village.
8. 33/11 kV substation by TNEB was available outside (2.5 km away) from the resident area.

== Economy ==
Land is suitable for the all kind of crops, but mostly the area cultivates

1. paddy
2. plantain
3. Sugar cane
4. sesame
5. maize
6. Betel Leaf
7. Black gram
8. Coconut tree

== Transport ==
Capital of Tamil Nadu- Chennai is approximately 325 km distance.

=== By Air ===
Nearby airport is Thiruchirapalli International Airport (IATA Code: TRZ) which is 65 km from MTT.

=== By Rail ===
Nearby railway station is Thanjavur Railway Station (Railway Code: TJ), 16 km away from MTT.

=== By Road ===
Thanjavur is nearby city for Melathirupanthuruthi distance of 14 km, Thiruvaiyaru is nearby town with distance of 5 km.

1. Thanjavur-14 km
2. Thirukattupalli-15 km
3. Basilica of Our Lady of Lourdes, Poondi-21 km
4. Kallanai Dam-29 km
5. Thiruvaiyaru-5 km

== Education ==
1. Government higher secondary school (Grade-06 to 12)
2. Government Elementary school (Grade -01 to 05)
3. Crescent Nursery and primary school- Private (Grade LKG To 5)
4. Mahatma Nursery and primary school- Private (Grade LKG To 5)

== Gallery ==
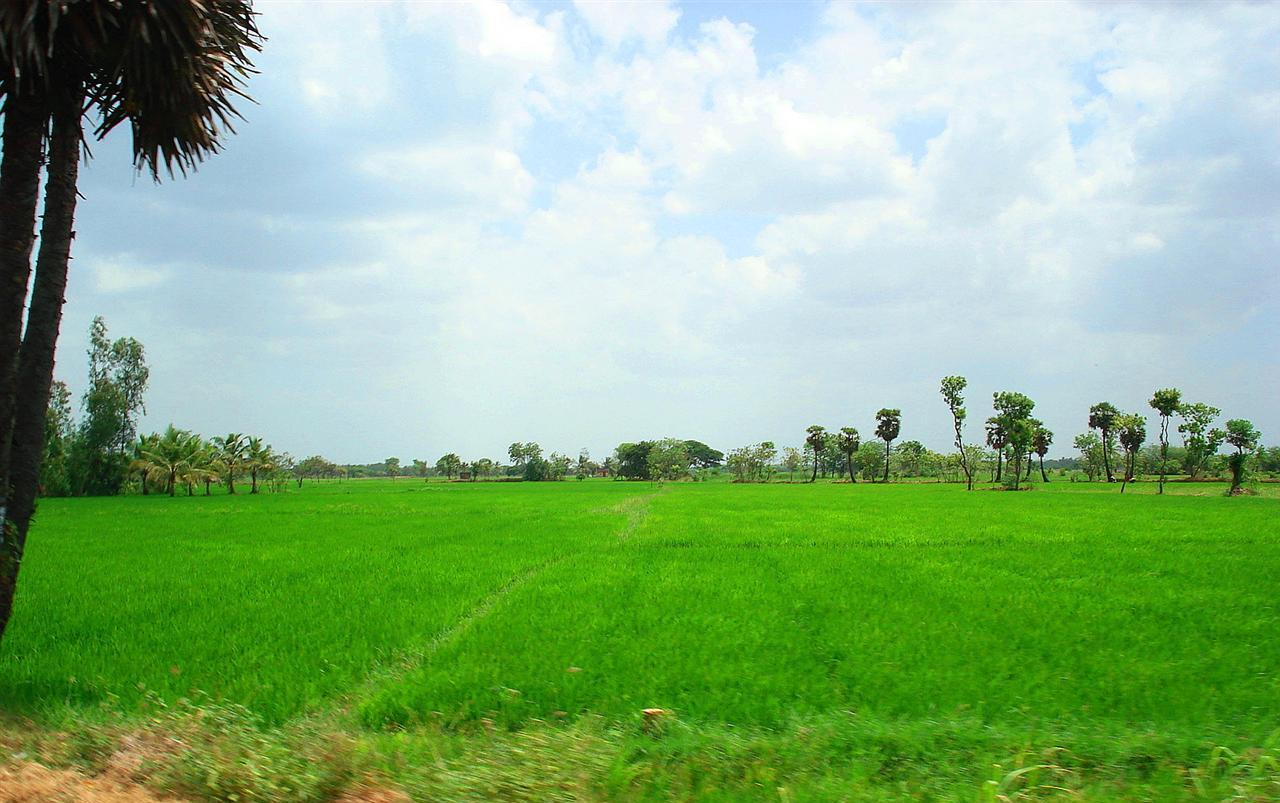
Field
