= Melacheval =

- Town
- Location in Tamil Nadu, India
- Coordinates: 08°39′56″N 77°37′33″E
- Country: India
- State: Tamil Nadu
- District: Tirunelveli

Population (2001)
  - Total: 7,340

Languages
  - Official: Tamil
- Time zone: UTC+5:30 (IST)

Melacheval (also spelt Melaseval) is a panchayat town in Tirunelveli district in the Indian state of Tamil Nadu.

== Demographics ==
As of 2001, India census, Melacheval had a population of 7340. Males constitute 49% of the population and females 51%. Melacheval has an average literacy rate of 71%, higher than the national average of 59.5%: male literacy is 78%, and female literacy is 64%. In Melacheval, 12% of the population is under 6 years of age.
