= C. Pudupatti =

Town in Tamil Nadu, India

C. Pudupatti is a Town panchayat in Theni district in the Indian state of Tamil Nadu. It is 35 km from Theni. Grapes, coconuts and bananas are the main crops here.

== Demographics ==
As of 2011 census, the population of the Town panchayat was 11,511. It has an area of 16.98 km^{2}, 15 wards and 48 streets. The Town panchayat falls under Cumbum Assembly constituency and Theni Lok Sabha constituency.
