= Parappadi =

Village in Tamil Nadu, India

Coordinates: 8°25′33″N 77°43′52″E

Parappadi is a village in the Elangulam panchayat, Tirunelveli district of Tamil Nadu, India.
