= Cheranmadevi =

Cheranmahadevi Cheranmahadevi, Nathampuja shethram, Nigaril Shozhasathurvedi mangalam
- town
- Nickname: Sermadevi
- Location in Tamil Nadu, India
- Coordinates: 8.68°N 77.57°E
- Country: India
- State: Tamil Nadu
- District: Tirunelveli
- Named for: Temples
- Elevation: 63 m (207 ft)

Population (2001)
  - Total: 16,320

Languages
  - Official: Tamil
- Time zone: UTC+5:30 (IST)
- PIN: 627414
- Telephone code: 04634

Cheranmahadevi is a panchayat town in Tirunelveli district in the Indian state of Tamil Nadu.

== Etymology ==
The name "Cheranmahadevi" is a combination of three words "Cheran", "Maha", and "Devi" (Translation: Cheran's daughter Devi).

== History ==
Cheranmahadevi has historical significance within the Tirunelveli region, with references in early Tamil sources and inscriptions indicating its importance during the Chola and Pandya periods. Owing to its location along the Thamirabarani River, the area developed as an agricultural and religious centre in southern Tamil Nadu. During the colonial and post‑Independence periods, Cheranmahadevi emerged as an important administrative centre. Scholarly studies on the genesis of Cheranmahadevi Taluk note that the town’s historical prominence, population distribution, and connectivity contributed to its designation as a taluk headquarters within Tirunelveli district.

== Geography ==
Cheranmahadevi is located on the bank of the Thamirabarani River. It is roughly 15 kilometres (9.3 mi) west of Tirunelveli in the foothills of Kozhundana Malai.

Kannadian canal is the first canal along the Thamirabarani river.

== Demographics ==
As of 2001 India census, Cheranmahadevi had a population of 16,320. Males constituted 49% of the population and females 51%. Cheranmahadevi has an average literacy rate of 77%, higher than the national average of 59.5%; with male literacy of 83% and female literacy of 71%. 9% of the population is under 6.

== Government and politics ==
Cheranmahadevi is Taluk headquarters with a subcollector office within the town and with Judicial Court 1 kilometre (0.62 mi) away. Cheranmahadevi assembly constituency is part of the Tirunelveli Lok Sabha constituency.

== Economy ==
Agriculture is the livelihood. The city is surrounded by paddy fields.

This ancient town hosts Ramaswamy Temple, more than 1000 years old. The road connecting to the river is lined with Marutham trees.

The other side of town is surrounded by a small hillock called Kozhundana malai. On both sides of the hill there are Murugan temples that are more than 300 years old.

== Culture ==
Bhaktavatsala Vishnu temple is considered to be a monument for its medieval carvings referring to the period of Chola and Pandiya kings. The temple was built from 1012 to 1044, Devotees are allowed to worship on Vidhivadha each month. Vidivadha Aga Vyadhipadha is a Dosha in some Jathaka (Janma Kundali). It is the only remedial temple in the world. Maha Vyadhipadha falls during December. Pilgrims gather to make remedial rituals.

== Transport ==
Cheranmahadevi is connected to Tirunelveli, Nagerkoil, Tenkasi by bus and train.

=== Air ===
The nearest airports are Trivandrum and Madurai, each approximately 150 kilometres (93 mi) away.

=== Rail ===
It is connected by rail to Chennai, Tenkasi and Tirunelveli.

=== Road ===
Cheranmahadevi is about 20 kilometres (12 mi) from Tirunelveli by road and rail. Buses reach Ambasamudram, Papanasam, Kalakkad, Tenkasi, Valliyur, and Nagercoil.
