= Moolakaraipatti =

- Town
- Location in Tamil Nadu, India
- Coordinates: 8°32′31″N 77°45′57″E
- Country: India
- State: Tamil Nadu
- District: Tirunelveli

Population (2001)
  - Total: 9,484

Languages
  - Official: Tamil
- Time zone: UTC+5:30 (IST)

Moolakaraipatti is a Panchayat town in Tirunelveli district in the Indian state of Tamil Nadu.

== Location ==
Located in Tirunelveli District of Tamil Nadu, Moolaikaraipatti is a prominent 'panchayat town'. It is situated in the south of Tirunelveli at a distance of 22 km, in the east of Munradaippu at a distance of 10 km, and 15 km. from Nanguneri.

== Demographics ==
As of 2001 India census, Moolakaraipatti had a population of 9484. Males constitute 48% of the population and females 52%. Moolakaraipatti has an average literacy rate of 70%, higher than the national average of 59.5%: male literacy is 76%, and female literacy is 64%. In Moolakaraipatti, 12% of the population is under 6 years of age.
