= Eruvadi =

Eruvadi Nellai Eruvai
- Town
- Location in Tamil Nadu, India
- Coordinates: 8°26′45″N 77°36′17″E
- Country: India
- State: Tamil Nadu
- District: Tirunelveli

Government
  - Type: Panchayath

Languages
  - Official: Tamil
- Time zone: UTC+5:30 (IST)
- PIN: 627103
- Telephone code: 91 4637
- Vehicle registration: TN 72
- Website: http://www.nellaieruvadi.com/

Eruvadi is a small town panchayath in Tirunelveli district in the state of Tamil Nadu, India.

== History ==
The spread of Islam led to the city's expansion between 400 and 700 years ago. According to local tradition, Eruvadi was subject to Islamic conquest by a Sufi warrior-saint named Saiyid Ibrahim with his 3,000 warrior disciples, in the twelfth century. The city has spread to Puliyur on the north side of the river with the streets ending at the river bank. The ancient people of Eruvadi were good at cultivation, trade and finance; they joined with the army of King Pandian Kulasekaran and went to fight with Cheran King and won the battle near Panakudi when Cheran King tried to occupy the Pandian kingdom. Eruvadi is also called Pulianjuvanam. There is an inscription at Muhaam Jumma Masjid about the name Pulianjuvanam.

== Demography ==
Religion in Eruvadi (2011)
1. Islam (58.4%)
2. Hinduism (36.6%)
3. Christianity (4.98%)

=== Religion ===
Eruvadi has Muslim, Hindu and Christian population and each community has their place of worship.

- Total - 18068
- Muslims - 58.41%
- Hindus - 36.61%
- Christians - 4.98%

== Adjacent communities ==
- Kanniyakumari
- Papanasam
- Thirukkurungudi
