= Bhavani taluk =

Coordinates: 11.45°N 77.68°E

Bhavani taluk was a taluk of Erode district of the Indian state of Tamil Nadu. The headquarters of the taluk is the town of Bhavani. In 2012, Bhavani taluk was reorganised to form the new Anthiyur taluk. It comes under Gobichettipalayam Revenue Division.

== Demographics ==
According to the 2011 census, the taluk of Bhavani had a population of 461,086 with 234,352 males and 226,734 females. There were 967 women for every 1,000 men. The taluk had a literacy rate of 61.86%. In the age group below 6 there were 19,410 males and 18,204 females. After bifurcation of Anthiyur taluk, the present Bhavani taluk may have a population of 222,941 approximately.

== Villages ==
- Mondipalayam
- Salangapalayam
- Dharmapuri
- Kavindapadi
- Senthampalayam
- Goundempalayam
- Periyapuliyur
