= Paramathi Velur =

Paramathi Velur Paramathi Velur
- panchayat Town
- Nickname: PaVel
- Location in Tamil Nadu, India
- Coordinates: 11.1121°N 78.0044°E
- Country: India
- State: Tamil Nadu
- Region: Tamil Nadu
- District: Namakkal

Population (2011)
  - Total: 25,012

Languages
  - Official: Tamil
- Time zone: UTC+5:30 (IST)
- PIN: 638182
- Postal code: 638182
- STD Code: 04268
- Vehicle registration: TN-88

Paramathi Velur, a Nagar panchayat in Paramathi-Velur taluk, Namakkal District, Tamil Nadu, India is situated just off the Srinagar - Kanyakumari National Highway 44 (India). This city is also called as Paramathi Velur, with STD Code 04268 & Postal code 638182.

Paramathi Velur is also a state assembly constituency in Tamil Nadu, India. It was formed after constituency delimitations in 2008 and forms a part of the Namakkal parliamentary constituency.

== Geography ==
Paramathi Velur is located at 11.1121°N 78.0044°E. It has an average elevation of 170 metres (566 feet).

== History ==
Kaveri Bridge, which connects the Namakkal and Karur districts, is a popular landmark in the city. The bridge was opened for traffic in 1952. Another bridge was also constructed adjacent to the old one. The longest road in India, NH-44, also passes through Paramathi Velur.

== Demographics ==
As of the 2011 Indian census, Velur had a population of 25,012. Males constitute 49% of the population and females 51%. Velur has an average literacy rate of 74%, equal to the national average; male literacy is 80%, and female literacy is 69%. In Velur, 9% of the population is under 6 years of age. The total area of Paramathi-Velur is 525.35 sq.km with a population density of 406 per sq.km.

Out of total population, 11,804 were engaged in work or business activity. Of this 7,709 were males while 4,095 were females. In census survey, worker is defined as person who does business, job, service, and cultivator and labour activity. Of total 11804 working population, 90.07% were engaged in Main Work while 9.93% of total workers were engaged in Marginal Work.

== Location ==
Paramathi Velur is located at the bank of River Cauvery. Tamil & English also the primary languages used here. National Highway 44 runs through this city.

== Agriculture and food ==
Agriculture is the main occupation in the city. The main crops cultivated are sugarcane, coconuts, bananas, yam, tapioca, betel, jute, turmeric and tomatoes.

A village called Pillikalpalayam which has Tamil Nadu's second largest Jaggery (Vellam, a sweet prepared from sugarcane juice) godown. The city is known for its Karpoora Pan leaf, which is exported to major states in North India.

A fluffy bread called Bun Parotta is served in the hotels of this area.

== Festivals ==
The Velur city has ancient temples such as the Kasi Viswanathar Temple, Mariaman Temples, Bhagavathi amman temple.

Adi 18th is celebrated at the Cauvery river bank with the release of Agal vilakku into the river.

== Sub Regional Transport Office ==
Paramathi Velur has a Motor Vehicle Inspectors office under Namakkal (South) RTO (TN-88). It has code TN-88Z.

Vehicles registered under TN-28-AY, TN-28-AW, TN-28-AU, TN-88-Z, TN-88-Y, TN-88-X, TN-88-W, TN-88-V, TN-88-U series belongs to this RTO Office.

== Politics ==
It is a part of the Paramathi-Velur (state assembly constituency). S Sekar from AIADMK is the MLA after winning the 2021 Tamil Nadu Legislative Assembly election. M LAKSHMI MOORTHI from DMK is Velur President After Winning in city Panchayat election 2022.

== Educational Institutions ==
- Kandasamy Kandar Arts & Science college
- Kandasamy Kandar Boys Higher Secondary School
- Kandasamy Kandar Girls Higher Secondary School
- Kandasamy Kandar Matriculation Higher Secondary School
- Kongu Matriculation Higher Secondary School
- KS Maniam Educational Institutions
- Paundamangalam Vivekananda matriculation higher secondary school
- RN Oxford school
- Malar school
- RKV Matriculation School, Jedarpalayam
