= Gobichettipalayam division =

Coordinates: 11°27′13″N 77°26′18″E

Gobichettipalayam division is one of the two revenue divisions in Erode district of Tamil Nadu State, India. This Division comprises six Taluks divided into nine CD blocks.

The six taluks are as follows:

- Anthiyur taluk
- Bhavani taluk
- Gobichettipalayam taluk
- Nambiyur taluk
- Sathyamangalam taluk
- Thalavadi taluk.

According to 2011 census, division has a population of 11,65,408 with an area of 3,745 km^{2}.
