= Kodumudi taluk =

Revenue block in the Erode district, India

Kodumudi taluk is a taluk of Erode district of the Indian state of Tamil Nadu. Kodumudi became a separate taluk in Erode district by trifurcation of the erst-while Erode taluk, along with Modakurichi taluk on 8 March 2016. The new taluk will have control over the same geographic entity of the Kodumudi revenue block with Kodumudi as the headquarters. It falls under Erode Revenue division.

== Demographics ==
According to the 2011 census, the erstwhile Erode taluk had a population of 820,720 with 410,323 males and 410,397 females. There were 1000 women for every 1000 men. The taluk had a literacy rate of 73.5. Child population in the age group below 6 was 35,016 Males and 33,498 Females. Whereas after trifurcation of the taluk, the newly created Kodumudi taluk will have a population of 107,466 approximately.

== Populated Towns and Villages ==
- Sivagiri
- Kandasamypalayam
- Pasur
- Unjalur
- Thamaraipalayam
- Vellottamparappu
- Anjur

== See also ==
- Kodumudi block
