= Ellispettai =

Village in Tamil Nadu, India

Coordinates: 11.404407°N 77.614492°E

Ellispet or Ellispettai is a small village near Erode in Tamil Nadu, India. This village was created by settling a small number of families during British India period as a settlement of early Christians.

== History ==
The original name of Ellispet was Ottagamedu, which means "camel mound" in Tamil. There was a rock in the east of the village that resembled a camel sitting with its head raised. During the early 19th century, due to rare human presence, it was a place for robbers, who robbed the travelers in an ambush that passed by the area in bullock carts. Shikakai, also known as Acacia concinna trees, grow very well here. The branches of the Shikakai tree create unusual sounds when the wind blows through them that used to scare people. It is the way to Sathyamangalam from Erode.

Ellispet was named after Ellis, a Christian missionary who settled World War I veterans. Each veteran was given 4 acres of farmland and a residential plot, which is irrigated by Bhavanisagar alternative canal projects. It was a barren land without any irrigation system, but after the initiatives from government officials, the land is watered with a canal called Rettai Vaaikaal.

Ellispet has a population of approximately 3,000 people. It is a well cultivated area for agriculture from the dam LBP Bhavanisagar.

While Tamil is the main language in the village, Hindi is also spoken by the majority of ex-service men and laborers working in the steel factories. English is also spoken widely by the foreign students studying in the nearby colleges.

== Transportation ==
Ellispet is located on the highway that connects Mysore and Erode. Tamil Nadu State Transport Corporation operates routes no. 7, 7C, 7B, B2, 44 from Erode to Kavandapadi. Other than these, all the route buses and private buses will stop in this village. Between Chithode to Kavandapadi all the nearby villages can get the buses from Ellispet. There are four bus stops for this village: Rattai Vaikaal, Ellispet, Mettu Kadai, and Therkathu Vaikaal. Other than the highway, a road goes through the village to Kanjikoil, called Kanjikoil Road.

== Education ==
Tamil Medium CSI Elementary school is the only school in Ellispet; it provides education up to 5th grade. High school students travel to the nearest places, which are Chithode, Kavandapadi, and Kanjikoil.

An arts and science college in Ellispet, Bharathidasan Arts and Science College, accommodates students from all over the world. An English medium orphanage school, called "Anbin Ootru", is also available near Therkathu vaaikkaal.

Strategically Chess Academy, located in the middle of Ellispettai, provides chess education to students across India via online and offline.

== Industry ==
Cast India, which are exporters of all types of aluminium scraps.

== Religion ==
Almost 98% of the population follows Christianity and there is no Hindu temple or Muslim mosque in this village. There are two Christian churches, one is Church of South India (CSI) directed by Ellispet postrate and the other one is a Pentecostal church founded by Yasu Manoharan.

== Festivals ==
Christmas is celebrated widely with the houses newly painted and the sports events conducted.

== Medical facilities ==
There is no hospital in the village.
