= Bhavanisagar block =

Revenue block in Tamil Nadu, India

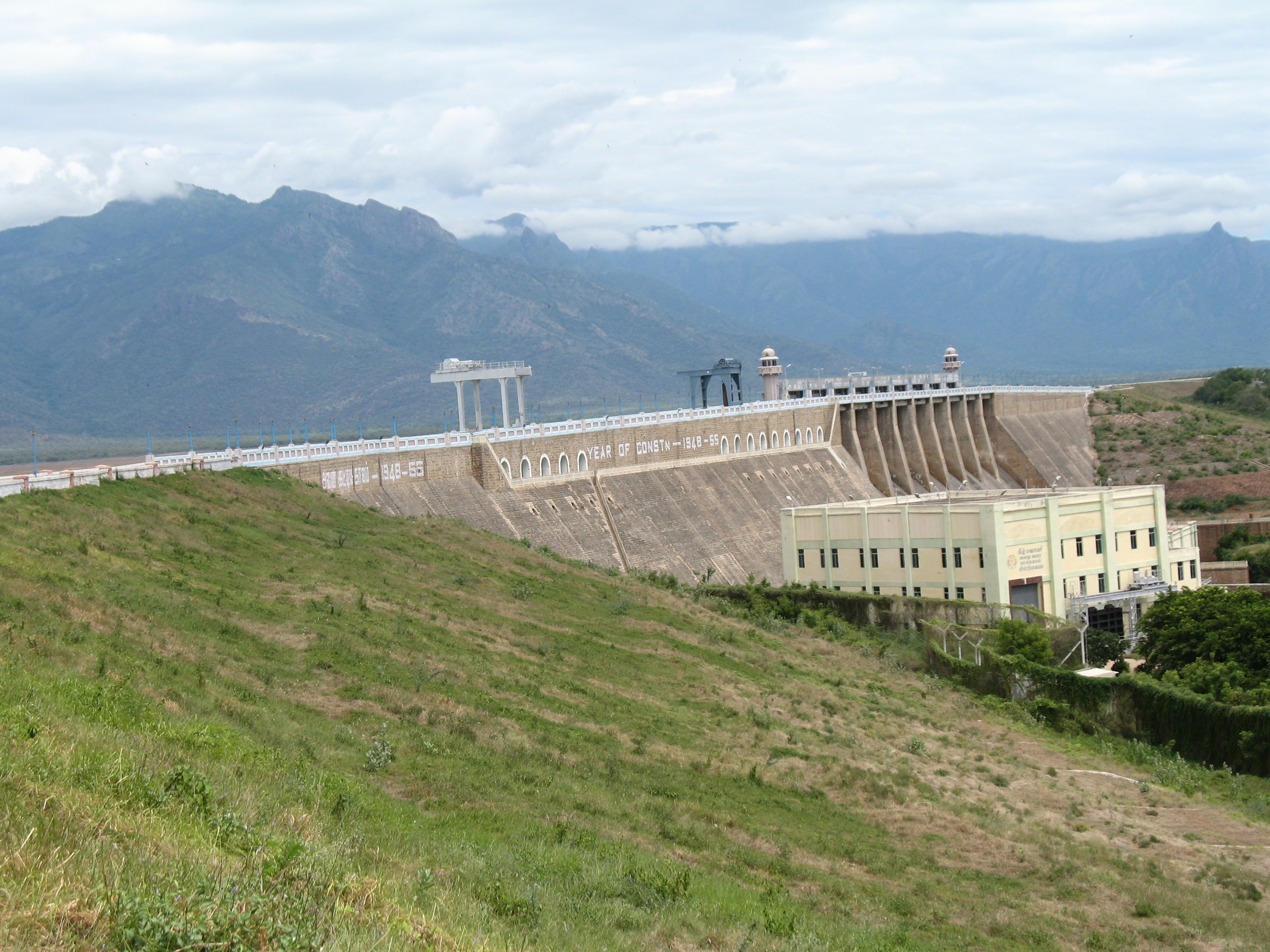
Bhavanisagar Dam and reservoir

Bhavanisagar block is a revenue block in the Erode district of Tamil Nadu, India. It has a total of 15 panchayat villages; the main town is Bhavanisagar.

== Economy ==
An important agricultural area, there is an Agricultural Research Station in Bhavanisagar and the block contains the Bhavanisagar Dam and Reservoir along the Bhavani River, built between 1948 and 1955. A seminar on Applied Nutrition Programme was held at Bhavanisagar in 1969, and agricultural machinery was upgraded in 1970−1971. In recent years, Bhavanisagar block has become a notable area of floriculture, with an increasing number of farmers turning to flower cultivation, with an increasing 10-15% of acreage dedicated to it annually according to 2010 reports. Of particular note is marigold (Tagetes) cultivation which can earn Rs. 6 to Rs. 10 per kg during the season and are usually purchased by the traders in Sathyamangalam and Coimbatore to companies producing poultry feed and food colouring.
