= Unjalur =

- Panchayat Town
- Location in Tamil Nadu, India
- Coordinates: 11.127781°N 77.877456°E
- Country: India
- State: Tamil Nadu
- District: Erode

Area
  - Total: 5.2 km^{2} (2.0 sq mi)

Population (2011)
  - Total: 2,482
  - Density: 480/km^{2} (1,200/sq mi)

Languages
  - Official: Tamil
- Time zone: UTC+5:30 (IST)

Unjalur is a panchayat town in Kodumudi taluk of Erode district in the Indian state of Tamil Nadu. It is located in the north-western part of the state. Spread across an area of 8.48 km^{2} (3.27 sq mi), it had a population of 2,482 individuals as per the 2011 census.

== Geography and administration ==
Kasipalayam is located in Kodumudi taluk, Erode division of Erode district in the Indian state of Tamil Nadu. Spread across an area of 5.2 km^{2} (2.0 sq mi), it is one of the 42 panchayat towns in the district. It is located in the north-western part of the state towards the southern end of the Indian peninsula. It is located on the catchment area of Bhavani River and irrigated by the Lower Bhavani Project Canal. It is served by the Unjalur railway station located on the Erode–Karur line of the Southern Railway zone.

The town panchayat is headed by a chairperson, who is elected by the members, who are chosen through direct elections. The town forms part of the Modakkurichi Assembly constituency that elects its member to the Tamil Nadu legislative assembly and the Erode Lok Sabha constituency that elects its member to the Parliament of India.

== Demographics ==
As per the 2011 census, Kasipalayam had a population of 2,482 individuals across 768 households. The population saw a marginal decrease compared to the previous census in 2001 when 2,628 inhabitants were registered. The population consisted of 1,235 males and 1,247 females. About 173 individuals were below the age of six years. The entire population is classified as urban. The town has an average literacy rate of 80.8%. About 9.6% of the population belonged to scheduled castes.

About 45.2% of the eligible population were employed. The economy is predominantly dependent on agriculture. Hinduism was the majority religion which was followed by 95.3% of the population, with Islam (4.4%) and Christianity (0.2%) being minor religions.
