= Ayyampalayam =

Ayyampalayam may refer to several places:

- Ayyampalayam, Dindigul, a town in Dindigul district, Tamil Nadu, India
- Ayyampalayam, Erode, a village in Erode district, Tamil Nadu, India
- Ayyampalayam, Karur, a village in India
