= Ayyampalayam, Erode =

Coordinates: 11.439074°N 77.540039°E

Ayyampalayam village, Kavindapadi post, is a small village of less than 1500 inhabitants, situated in the Bhavani taluk, Erode district in Tamil Nadu.

This village is a part of Kavindapadi Revenue village. Agriculture is the primary business.

Coconuts, Paddy, Sugarcane and Turmeric are the main crops grown in Ayyampalayam.

The nearest big village is Kavindapadi. Other variants of the spelling may include Kavundhapadi/Kavundapadi.

== Neighborhoods ==
- Chithode
- Nasiyanur
- Thingalur
- Kanjikoil
- Kavindapadi
- Bhavani
- Lakshmi Nagar
- Komarapalayam
- Erode
- Perundurai
- Gobichettipalayam
- Sathyamangalam
- Othakudirai
