= Kalingarayan Anicut =

- Location within Tamil Nadu
- Official name: Kalingarayan Dam
- Country: India
- Coordinates: 11°26′31.8″N 77°40′35.5″E
- Status: Operational
- Opening date: 1283; 743 years ago

Dam and spillways
- Type of dam: Embankment and Barrage
- Length: 902.5 m (2,961 ft)

Kalingarayan Anicut is a barrage on the Bhavani River in Erode district, Tamil Nadu. It is located before Kooduthurai where Bhavani meets with Kaveri in Bhavani, Erode.

== History and design ==
The dam was constructed by Kongu chieftain Kalingarayan Gounder. It is one of the ancient River linking projects in Tamil Nadu and was undertaken to establish a link between Bhavani River and Noyyal River. The project including construction of the dam and canal started in 1271 and was completed in 1283.

This irrigation project involved the construction of a barrage to divert the water to Kalingarayan Canal. The dam and the canal irrigates approximately 15,743 acres (6,371 ha) of agricultural land. In 2016, Government of Tamil Nadu undertook development works to strengthen the dam's embankments by concrete plugging.

== Tourism ==
In 2017, Government of Tamil Nadu planned to convert the dam into a tourist attraction. In 2017, a children's park along with a memorial hall and statue of Kalingarayan was inaugurated by then Chief Minister of Tamil Nadu Palaniswami.
