= Kombanai Pudhur =

Village in India

Kombanai Pudhur Kombanai
- village
- Country: India
- State: Tamil Nadu
- District: Erode

Languages
  - Official: Tamil
- Time zone: UTC+5:30 (IST)
- Nearest city: Erode

Kombanai Pudur, sometimes written as Kombanai Pudhur, is a small village in Erode District, Tamil Nadu in India. Two canals flow through the centre of the village, namely Kurankan Canal and Kalingarayan Canal. It has one government hospital, also used as a veterinary hospital.

The main crops are sugarcane, turmeric, paddy, and coconut. The main food is rice, idli, dosai, and vadai. The major festivals celebrated in the area are Diwali, Thai Pongal, Mariyamman, Vinayagar and Chathurthi.
