= Modakurichi taluk =

Modakurichi taluk is a taluk of Erode district of the Indian state of Tamil Nadu. Modakurichi became a separate taluk in Erode district by trifurcation of the erstwhile Erode taluk, along with Kodumudi taluk on 8 March 2016. The new taluk will have control over the same geographic entity of the Modakurichi revenue block with Modakurichi as the headquarters. It falls under the Erode revenue division.

== Demographics ==
According to the 2011 census, the erstwhile Erode taluk had a population of 820,720 with 410,323 males and 410,397 females. There were 1,000 women for every 1,000 men. The taluk had a literacy rate of 73.5%. Child population in the age group below 6 years were composed of 35,016 males and 33,498 females. After trifurcation of the taluk, the newly created Modakurichi taluk will have a population of ~160,824.

== Populated Towns and Villages ==
- Arachalur
- Avalpoondurai
- Nanjai Uthukuli
- Elumathur
- Lakkapuram
- Selvanagar
