= Vellottamparappu =

- Panchayat town
- Location in Tamil Nadu, India
- Coordinates: 11°13′32″N 77°51′46″E
- Country: India
- State: Tamil Nadu
- District: Erode

Area
  - Total: 13.5 km^{2} (5.2 sq mi)

Population (2011)
  - Total: 7,621
  - Density: 565/km^{2} (1,460/sq mi)

Languages
  - Official: Tamil
- Time zone: UTC+5:30 (IST)

Vellottamparappu is a panchayat town in Kodumudi taluk of Erode district in the Indian state of Tamil Nadu. It is located in the north-western part of the state. Spread across an area of 13.5 km^{2} (5.2 sq mi), it had a population of 7,621 individuals as per the 2011 census.

== Geography and administration ==
Vellottamparappu is located in Kodumudi taluk, Erode division of Erode district in the Indian state of Tamil Nadu. Spread across an area of 13.5 km^{2} (5.2 sq mi), it is one of the 42 panchayat towns in the district. It is located in the north-western part of the state.

Vellottamparappu panchayat is headed by a chairperson, who is elected by the members, who are chosen through direct elections. The town forms part of the Modakkurichi Assembly constituency that elects its member to the Tamil Nadu legislative assembly and the Erode Lok Sabha constituency that elects its member to the Parliament of India.

== Demographics ==
As per the 2011 census, Vellottamparappu had a population of 7,621 individuals across 2,431 households. The population saw a marginal decrease compared to the previous census in 2001 when 8,131 inhabitants were registered. The population consisted of 3,769 males and 3,852 females. About 516 individuals were below the age of six years. The entire population is classified as urban. The town has an average literacy rate of 74.5%. About 15.4% of the population belonged to scheduled castes.

About 64.7% of the eligible population were employed with majority involved in agriculture and allied activities. Hinduism was the majority religion which was followed by 98% of the population, with Islam (1.2%) and Christianity (0.7%) being minor religions.
