= Sivagiri, Erode =

Sivagiri
- Panchayat town
- Location in Tamil Nadu, India
- Coordinates: 11°7′4″N 77°47′17″E
- Country: India
- State: Tamil Nadu
- District: Erode

Area
  - Total: 23.4 km^{2} (9.0 sq mi)

Population (2011)
  - Total: 17,979
  - Density: 768/km^{2} (1,990/sq mi)

Languages
  - Official: Tamil
- Time zone: UTC+5:30 (IST)

Sivagiri is a panchayat town in Erode taluk of Erode district in the Indian state of Tamil Nadu. It is located in the north-western part of the state. Spread across an area of 23.4 km^{2} (9.0 sq mi), it had a population of 17,979 individuals as per the 2011 census.

== Geography and administration ==
Sivagiri is located in Erode taluk, Erode division of Erode district in the Indian state of Tamil Nadu. Spread across an area of 23.4 km^{2} (9.0 sq mi), it is one of the 42 panchayat towns in the district. It is located in the north-western part of the state.

The town panchayat is headed by a chairperson, who is elected by the members, who are chosen through direct elections. The town forms part of the Modakkurichi Assembly constituency that elects its member to the Tamil Nadu legislative assembly and the Erode Lok Sabha constituency that elects its member to the Parliament of India.

== Demographics ==
As per the 2011 census, Sivagiri had a population of 17,979 individuals across 5,407 households. The population saw a marginal increase compared to the previous census in 2001 when 16,255 inhabitants were registered. The population consisted of 8,909 males and 9,070 females. About 1,427 individuals were below the age of six years. The entire population is classified as urban. The town has an average literacy rate of 77.3%. About 12.9% of the population belonged to scheduled castes.

About 61.3% of the eligible population were employed. Hinduism was the majority religion which was followed by 98% of the population, with Christianity (1.1%) and Islam (0.8%) being minor religions. The panchayat town is home to popular temples such as the Ponkaliamman temple dedicated to Shiva and Amman and the Velayuthaswamy temple dedicated to Murugan.
