= Kandasamypalayam =

Village in Tamil Nadu, India

Coordinates: 11.106904°N 77.737864°E

Kandasamypalayam is the town in Erode District belongs to Kollankoil Town Pachayat, located 25 km from Erode, Tamil Nadu, India. More than 75% of the people are dependent on agriculture and the rest are agri-based business and other occupations. There are two schools available in this village, one government primary school, another one English Medium School. Paddy, sugarcane, turmeric are the major crops cultivated in this area. The village water source is mainly based on Lower Bhavani Project Canal fed by Bhavanisagar Dam.

== Temple ==
The well known temple for this area Sri Sadayappa Swami Temple is located near this village in kandasamypalayam. This temple is famous for Tamil Puthandu(Chithiraikani), on that day Annadhanam will be provided to thousands of people on behalf of village people. Other Temples include Sri Sellandiyamman temple, Sri Kariyakaaliyamman Temple, Sri Maahaaliyamman Temple, Sri Maariyamman Temple, Eswaran Temple, Perumal Temple.

== Weekly Market ==
Kandasamypalayamweekly Market will be held on Tuesday every week. All agriculture people in surrounding areas bring their agricultural products to the market. The Market is present near to Panchayat office.

Town Panchayat officials
Chairperson
