= Kavandapadi =

Village in India

Kavindapadi kavundapadi Kavindapadi, kvp
- village
- Nickname: Kavunthi
- Country: India
- State: Tamil Nadu
- District: Erode

Languages
  - Official: Tamil
- Time zone: UTC+5:30 (IST)
- PIN: 638455
- Telephone code: 04256
- Vehicle registration: TN-36
- Nearest city: Erode, Gobichettipalyam, Perundurai, Bhavani, Anthiyur
- Website: http://www.kavunthi.com

Kavindapadi, also known as Kavundapadi, is located in Erode District of Tamil Nadu, India which is one of the major producers of sugar in India. It is also famous for its agriculture, producing the lump sum amount of sugarcane and bananas to the people of Tamil Nadu. Kavindapadi is located on the way of Erode to Sathyamangalam.

Kavindapadi can be easily identified with Four Roads Junction on the way to Sathy from Erode. In the three road junction we have bus stand. Nearest villages like Bommanpatti, Velampalayam, Nalligoundanoor, Chinna kavundanur, pappankatoor, Poomandagoundanur, Ayyampalayam, Perunthalaiyur, P.Mettupalyam, K.Pudur, Pandianpalayam, Kolathuppalayam, Vellankovil, Kucharamadai, Singanullur, Paaraikaattuvalasu, Kannadipudhu, Siruvallur, Periyapuliyur, Appakoodal, Salangapalayam, Senthampalayam are famous for agricultural and hand-loom products.

The few more notable things about Kavindapadi is the massive sugar provider to Palani Murugar Temple for preparing the famous panjamirtham. And it's having massive sugar storage area and sugar market, weekly market and Vijayan Theater, Valarmathi Theater, Bava thirumana mahal, Kavin Mahal, Laxsmi Mahal, Sakthi Mahal, Thangam Mahal, Mariamman temple festival (every year in March), Kaaliamman temple festival (every year in December). Kavindapadi has weekly market on Wednesday opposite to police station. It is one of the biggest markets in the district. It gives opportunity for surrounding people to buy/sell products at an affordable cost. KVP is mid-place for Bhavani, Gobi, Perundurai, Erode. It serves origin point to all these 4 places. It is also known for its sugarcane plantation in and around kavindapadi.

== Kavindapadi Nattu Sakkarai ==
Erode district's Kaundappadi jaggery (jaggery powder) has been officially granted the Geographical Indication (GI) tag in December 2025. As of 2026, the key information about this product is as follows:

- Special Features: Kaundappadi jaggery is traditionally prepared without any chemicals, sulphur, or refining processes. It has a dark golden-brown color and a soft, powdery texture.
- Production Method: This jaggery is made by extracting fresh sugarcane juice and slowly boiling it using wood-fired stoves.
- Application Details: The application for the GI tag was submitted by the Tamil Nadu State Agricultural Marketing Board.
- Usage: Due to its unique taste and mineral-rich properties, it is also used in the preparation of Panchamirtham at the Palani Dhandayuthapani Swamy Temple.

== Kavindapadi handloom clothes ==
Annai Indira Gandhi Handloom Weavers Cooperative Production and Sales society at Kaunthappadi and E.H.210 Sri Mariamman Mahalir Weavers Cooperative Society Ltd. and some more societies are involved in production of Handloom door mat. These are especially known as "Erode handloom door mat". and also Kaunthappadi handloom weavers produce and sell handloom clothes through the Co-operative Production and Marketing Association.

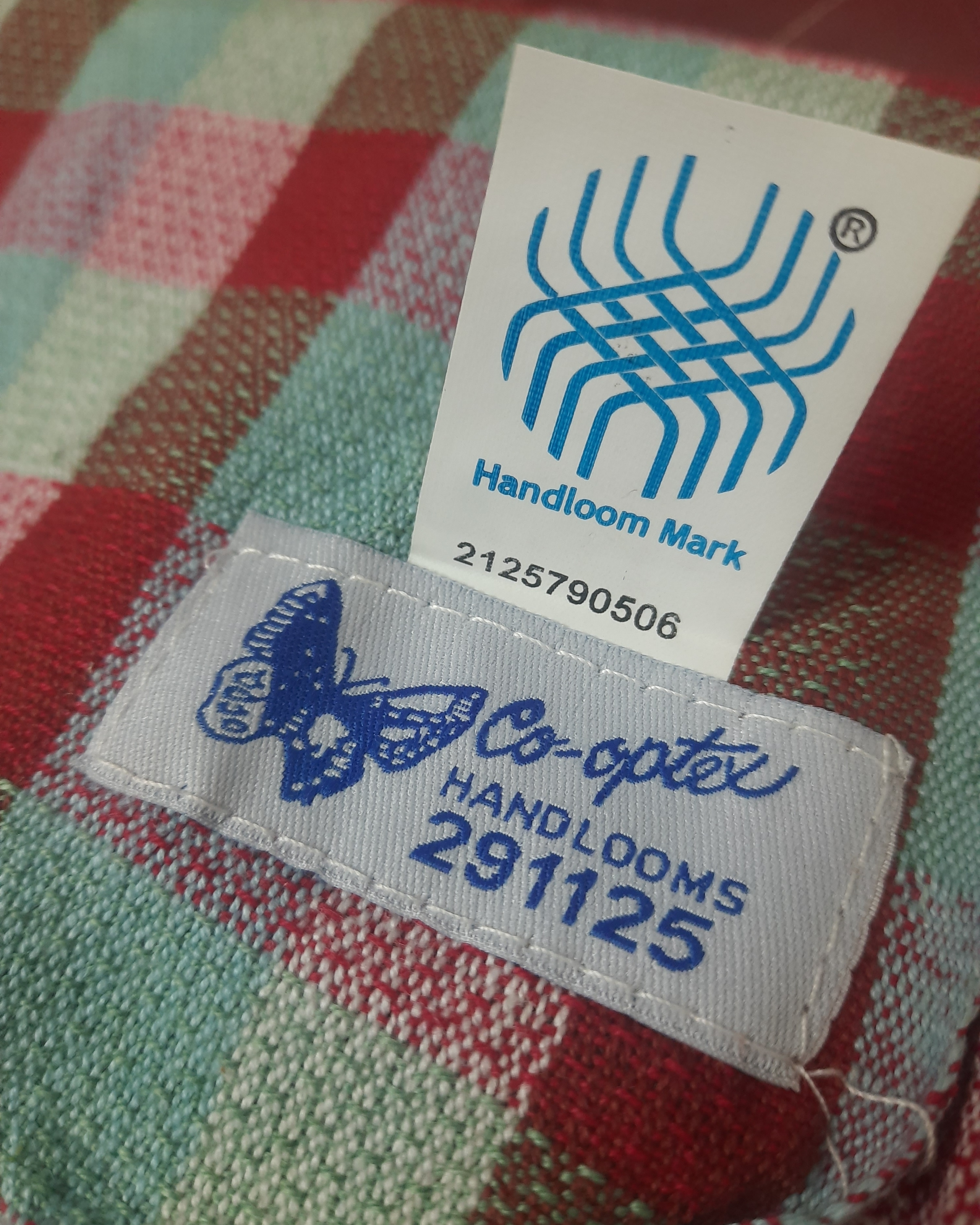
கவுந்தப்பாடி கைத்தறித் துணிகள் - Kavindapadi Handloom Clothes

Tamil Nadu is located in downsouth of Indian Union territory. Erode is one of the districts of Tamil Nadu.

Agricultural activities plays a major role in Tamil Nadu. Next to agriculture, weaving culture plays a major role economically, commercially and culturally.

Handloom weavers living in Tamil Nadu make handloom sarees, handloom dhotis, handloom jamakkalam, handloom bedsheets and handloom door mats.

Weavers produce handloom footwear through a women's organization in the Dukkanayakkanpalayam and Kempanayakkanpalayam areas at the foothills of the Western Ghats.

Weavers living in Kizhvani area under Bhavani circle participate in production and sales activities through Kizhvani handloom production and sales association.

== Municipality ==
Kavandapadi Municipality was formed by merging Salangapalayam and P. Mettupalayam town panchayat with Kavandapadi village panchayat.

== Neighborhoods ==
- Kanjikoil
- Gobichettipalayam
- Chithode
- Perundurai
- Nasiyanur
- Thingalur
- Lakshmi Nagar
- Komarapalayam
- Erode
- Bhavani
- Sathyamangalam
- Kolappalur
- Nambiyur
- Kunnathur
- Avinashi
- Perumanallur
- Chengapalli
- Vijayamangalam
- Tiruppur
- Othakudirai

== Bus Terminus ==
- Kavindapadi has a Bus stand which link more parts of Erode district and other neighbouring districts. Some of them are as follows:

Erode Bus Terminus, Erode railway junction, Kanjikoil, Perundurai, Gobichettipalayam, Sathyamangalam, Chithode, Nasiyanur, Thingalur, Othakudirai, Vijayamangalam, Chennimalai, Ingur, Vadamugam Vellode, Arachalur, Bhavani, Kumarapalayam, Lakshmi Nagar, Avalpoondurai, Kangeyam, Kolappalur, Kunnathur, Perumalmalai, Thudupathi, SIPCOT Perundurai, Uthukuli, Tiruppur, Anthiyur, Paruvatchi, Jambai, Appakudal, Mettur, Dharmapuri, Krishnagiri, Hosur, Namakkal, Salem, Bannari, Mysore, Trichy, Tanjore, Kumbakonam, Madurai, Marthandam, Nagarkovil.

== Schools ==
- Govt Boys Higher Secondary School (http://www.icbse.com/schools/gbhss-kavindapadi/33100301712)
- Govt Girls Higher Secondary School (http://www.icbse.com/schools/gghss-kavindapadi/33100301705)
- Govt Primary school (North)
- Govt Primary school (South)
- Saraswathi Vidhyashram Matriculation School
- Honey Buds (Kindergarten)
- TNK Matriculation and Higher Secondary School
- Kalaimakal Kalvi nilayam
- Senthil Typewriting & Computer Center
- i-tech computers, PMKVY Training Center

== Colleges ==
- Sri Venketaswara Engineering college, Othakkuthirai
- EIT Polytechnic College is located 3 km away from Kavindapadi.
- Computer Software College (CSC), 225, Near Bus Stand, Kavindapadi-638455.
- Adharsh Vidhyalaya College Of Education, address: Adharsh Nagar A; Paruvachi Post; Bhavani; Erode—638 312.
- Aishwarya Polytechnic College, address: Errattaikaradu; Paruvachi Post; Bhavni (tk); Erode—638 312.
- Best College Of Education, Address: No 5/86; Sevakoundanur Periya Puliyur; Bhavani Main Rd; Erode—638455
- Bhavani Polytechnic College, address: Mettur Main Rd; Varadhanallur; Bhavani (tk); Erode—638 311.
- Adharsh Vidyalaya College Of Arts And Science For Women, address: Adharsh Nagar A; Paruvachi Village; Bhavani (tk) Erode Dist.
- Inspire Info Tech (IIT), Near Bus Stand, Kavindapadi.
- Trendy Designers, (All kind of designs and software developments), address: ACS Nilayam, Near State Bank, Kavundapadi.

== Hotels & Restaurants ==
Kavindapadi consists of a handful of hotels which are mostly located in and around the 4 road junction.

Totally, 2 - Kalan kadai's, 25 - foods shop's &

27 backery's are in and around Kavindapadi.

Famous hotel's are listed below:-

Thara mess - avail veg & non-veg (cost effective)

Harini Family Restaurant - avil veg & non-veg (bitcostly)

Muniyandi Vilas - avail veg & non-veg (cost effective)

Chennai fast food - avil veg & non-veg (cost effective)

Kumar mess - only parrotas (famous parrota shop)

Selvi mess - avail veg & non-veg

Radha mess - avail veg & non-veg ( bit costly not worthy)

Saravana Bhavan - veg ( delicious foods avail)

Jaya cafe - veg ( famous for masal dosa )

Bishmi briyani kadai - famous for briyani & chilly

K R briyani kadai - getting famous now

Kavunthi's kitchen - all foods avail at decent cost

CSK boys fast food - all fast food varieties are avail

Babu fast food - foot starting from rs.20

S.P fast food - good quality meals & fast foods avail

Friends fast food - avail Veg & non-veg fast foods

Appatha idly kadai - avail tiffin items

Night tiffen centre - avail paniyaram & idly only

Selvi restaurant - near bus stand all food avail.

== Banks ==
Most public and private banks have branches in Kavundapadi. The majority include

- TamilNadu Grama Bank
- SBI Bank-Gobichettipalayam Road
- Canara Bank kavandapadi branch
- Karur Vysya Bank-Erode Road
- Indian Overseas Bank Erode Road [Opp. to KVB]
- Kavindapadi Co-operative Bank, Appakoodal Road..
- Tamil Nadu Merchantile Bank, Dharmaapuri

== Weekly Sugar Market ==
It is a weekly market in Kavindapdi on the way to Gobi, which is located around 2 km from Bus Stand towards Gobi. Market is available only on every Saturday in a week starts at 9.30 AM to 11 AM IST. The Market consists of around 60+ Godowns, each godown can store more than 5 Tonnes of Jaggery.
