= Thamaraipalayam =

Village in India

Thamarai Palayam
- village
- Country: India
- State: Tamil Nadu
- District: Erode

Population
  - Total: 3,000

Languages
  - Official: Tamil
- Time zone: UTC+5:30 (IST)
- PIN: 638152
- Telephone code: 04204
- Vehicle registration: TN-33
- Nearest city: Erode
- Literacy: 79%
- Lok Sabha constituency: erode

Thamaraipalayam is a village located on the west from banks of the Cauvery, in Erode district, Tamil Nadu, India.

== Overview ==
Thamaraipalayam is one of the village located in the Erode Karur Main Road. Acts as a junction for minor villages near by.

Below facilities are available at Thamaraipalayam

1. Banking Services - Canara Bank with ATM

2. PHC with bed facility

3. Post office

4. Veterinary Hospital

Industries in Thamaraipalayam

1. GokulaKrishna Oil Mill 2. Velavan Modern Rice Mill 3. SivaMurugan Modern Rice Mill 4. Sathya Oil Mill

This village is mainly popular for drama. It has more than 70 years history in a drama center named இளங்கோ நாடக மன்றம் which is one of oldest manrams in Erode District.

The village has a government high school and a private matriculation school, serving children from nearby villages. A thirty-bed government hospital and a private hospital are also present.

== Geography ==
Thamaraipalayam is located at 11°7'25"N 77°51'25"E. It has an average elevation of 199 metres (656 feet). It has the highest elevation peak from sea level among all other places in this region. It is located 32 km to the south of Erode City, 28 km to the north-west of Karur town, 35 km to the west of Namakkal town and 52 km to the east of Tirupur City. It is also 5 km to the west of Kodumudi. The Cauvery River also takes a deep twist in its whole flow from the south towards the east about 5 km to the west of Kodumudi.

== Religion ==
Residents follow Hindu as their religion with most of them basically from Kongu Vellala Gounder caste with Thooran Kootam people as the majority and Kannan Kootam as minority. There are two temples named Bagavathi Amman Koyil and Kari Kaali Amman Koyil which has functions in the Month of Maargali and Panguni (Pangu kolvaai Nee!!), present in the village. These two temples are maintained by the village people.

A Vishnu temple named Varatha Raja Swamy and a Shiva temple named Sholeswarar is located at the bank of Cauvery River.

== Educational institutions ==
- Thamarai Matric Hr Sec School – at present, this school serves as the best school in district level.

== Occupation ==
As this village is mostly an agriculture-based village, most of the people in this village are involved in agriculture. They cultivate sugarcane, turmeric, paddy, sunflowers, groundnuts, etc. Since the village is very well connected with Tirupur, which is a textile hub, many people work as daily wage employees.

== Culture ==
The cuisine of this village is predominantly South Indian with rice as its base. The flavours are generally fairly mild to spicy. One can get to taste the authentic Kongu cuisine in this village. The locals still retain their rural flavour, with many people still having their food on a banana leaf.

The village is the center of two big panchayats, Kodumudi and Sivagiri. People used to go to Kodumudi and Sivagiri to catch up with the latest movies. Also, since this is a village, there are lot of sports like cricket tournaments, kabaddi tournaments on a monthly basis.

== Transportation ==
This village is situated between Erode and Karur. The buses which pass by that route are 15B, KT, MP and Govt. operated Jeeva buses. The nearest railway station is the Kodumudi Railway station which is 5 km from the village.
