= Punjai Thottakurichi =

- Town
- Location in Tamil Nadu, India Punjai Thottakurichi (India)
- Coordinates: 11°03′45″N 78°02′14″E
- Country: India
- State: Tamil Nadu
- District: Karur

Population (2001)
  - Total: 9,589

Languages
  - Official: Tamil
- Time zone: UTC+5:30 (IST)

Punjai Thottakurichi is a Town Panchayat in Karur district in the Indian state of Tamil Nadu.

== Demographics ==
As of 2001 India census, Punjai Thottakurichi had a population of 9589. Males constitute 49% of the population and females 51%. Punjai Thottakurichi has an average literacy rate of 63%, higher than the national average of 59.5%: male literacy is 76%, and female literacy is 50%. In Punjai Thottakurichi, 9% of the population is under 6 years of age.

== Settlements ==
- Ayyampalayam
