= State Highway 15 (Tamil Nadu) =

Road in Tamil Nadu, India

State Highway 15

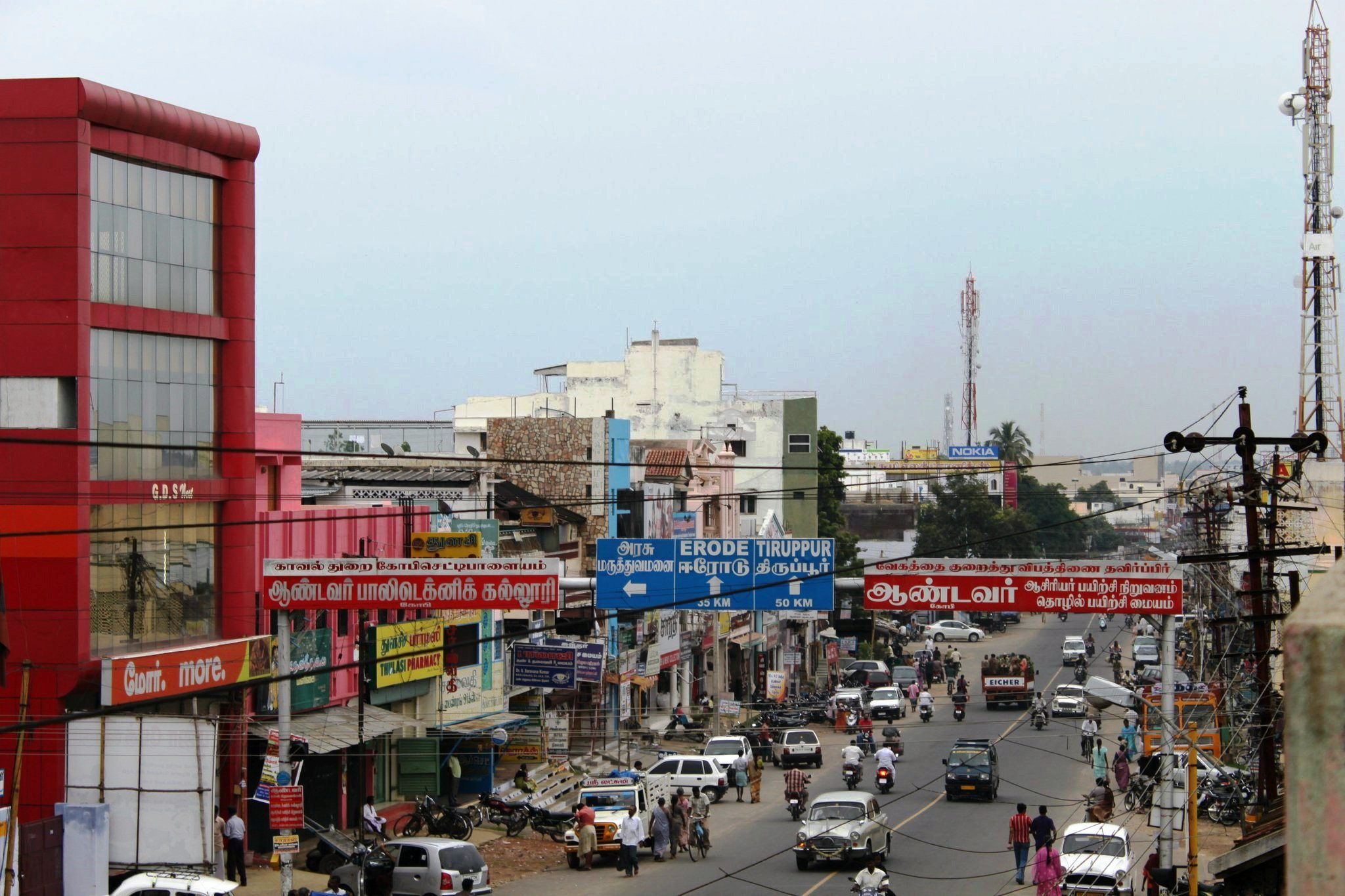
- State Highway 15 at Gobichettipalayam

Route information
- Maintained by Highways and Minor Ports Department
- Length: 161.63 km (100.43 mi)

Major junctions
- From: Erode, Tamil Nadu
- To: Udagamandalam, Nilgiris district, Tamil Nadu

Location
- Country: India
- State: Tamil Nadu
- Districts: Erode, Coimbatore, Nilgiris

Highway system
- Roads in India; Expressways; National; State; Asian; State Highways in Tamil Nadu
← SH 10	→ SH 19

State Highway 15 (Tamil Nadu) (SH-15) is a State Highway maintained by the Highways Department of Government of Tamil Nadu. It connects Erode with Udagamandalam (Ooty) in the western part of Tamil Nadu.

== Route ==
The total length of the SH-15 is 161.6 km.

Route: Erode- Gobichettipalayam - Sathyamangalam - Mettupalayam - Kotagiri - Udagamandalam

The Mettupalayam-Kotagiri section is also known as Kotagiri Ghat Road. It is one of the five Nilgiri Ghat Roads.

Entering Sathyamangalam along the State Highway 15

== Destinations ==
The highway passes through the following places:

- Erode District - Erode, Gobichettipalayam, Sathyamangalam
- Coimbatore District - Mettupalayam
- Nilgiris District - Kotagiri, Udagamandalam

== Junctions ==
The highway meets the following arterial roads along the way:

- State Highway 20 at Erode
- National Highway 544 at Chittode
- State Highway 81 at Gobichettipalayam
- State Highway 15A at Gobichettipalayam
- National Highway 948 at Sathyamangalam
- National Highway 181 at Mettupalayam
