= Selvanagar =

- village
- Country: India
- State: Tamil Nadu

Languages
  - Official: Tamil
- Time zone: UTC+5:30 (IST)

Selvanagar is a village in Erode District in the Indian state of Tamil Nadu. It houses numerous cotton mills besides having a strong number of farmers and weavers.
