= Kalingarayan Canal =

Canal in Tamil Nadu, India

Coordinates: 11°03′N 77°54′E

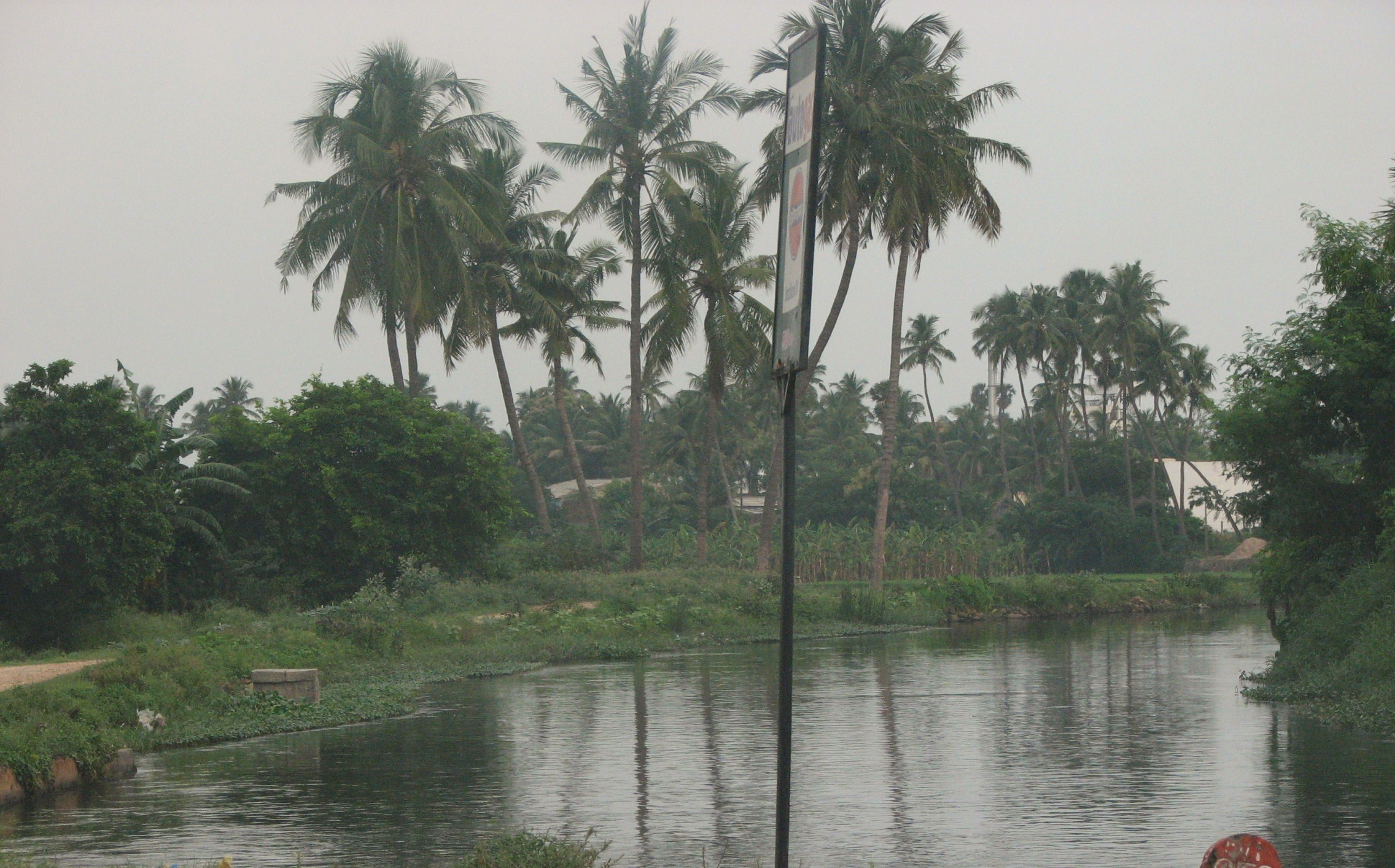
- Canal near Erode
- Interactive map of Kalingarayan Canal

Specifications
- Length: 56.5 miles (90.9 km)
- Status: open

History
- Date completed: 1283; 743 years ago

Geography
- Branch of: Bhavani River

Kalingarayan Canal is a 56.2-mile (90.5 km) long irrigation canal in the Erode district, Tamil Nadu, India. The canal, which irrigates approximately 15,743 acres (6,371 ha) of agricultural land, was constructed by Kongu chieftain Lingaya Kalingaraya Gounder. Its source is the Kalingarayan Anicut near Bhavani. The project, including construction of the dam and canal, started in 1271 and was completed in 1283.

== Design and architecture ==
The canal connects the Bhavani River and Noyyal River, two major tributaries of the Kaveri. It is one of the oldest river linking projects in India. The canal begins at Kalingarayan Anicut on Bhavani River and joins Noyyal River near Kodumudi. The canal is 56 miles (90 km) long and was constructed in a wave pattern to reduce water damage to the canal banks and increase the ground water table. The canal crosses three other canals via aqueducts namely Sunnambu canal near Suriyampalayam, Pichaikaranpallam Canal near BP Agraharam and Perumpallam Canal near Karaivaikkal.

== Environmental threat ==
As the initial portion of the canal runs through the highly industrialized and urbanized areas of Erode Municipal Corporation, the discharge of untreated effluents from the textile dyeing units and leather tanneries introduce major pollutants. To prevent mixing of sewage into the canal, Government of Tamil Nadu plans to build concrete walls on the sides and an additional canal of 15 kilometres (9.3 mi) has been constructed alongside the main canal to carry the sewage. The entire stretch of first 30 km (19 mi) of the canal running through Erode Municipal Corporation is proposed to be provided with concrete lining in a phased manner. Navigable roads were developed along the banks throughout this stretch to reduce access to the canal.

== See also ==
- LBP Canal
