= Bhavanisagar =

- Panchayat town
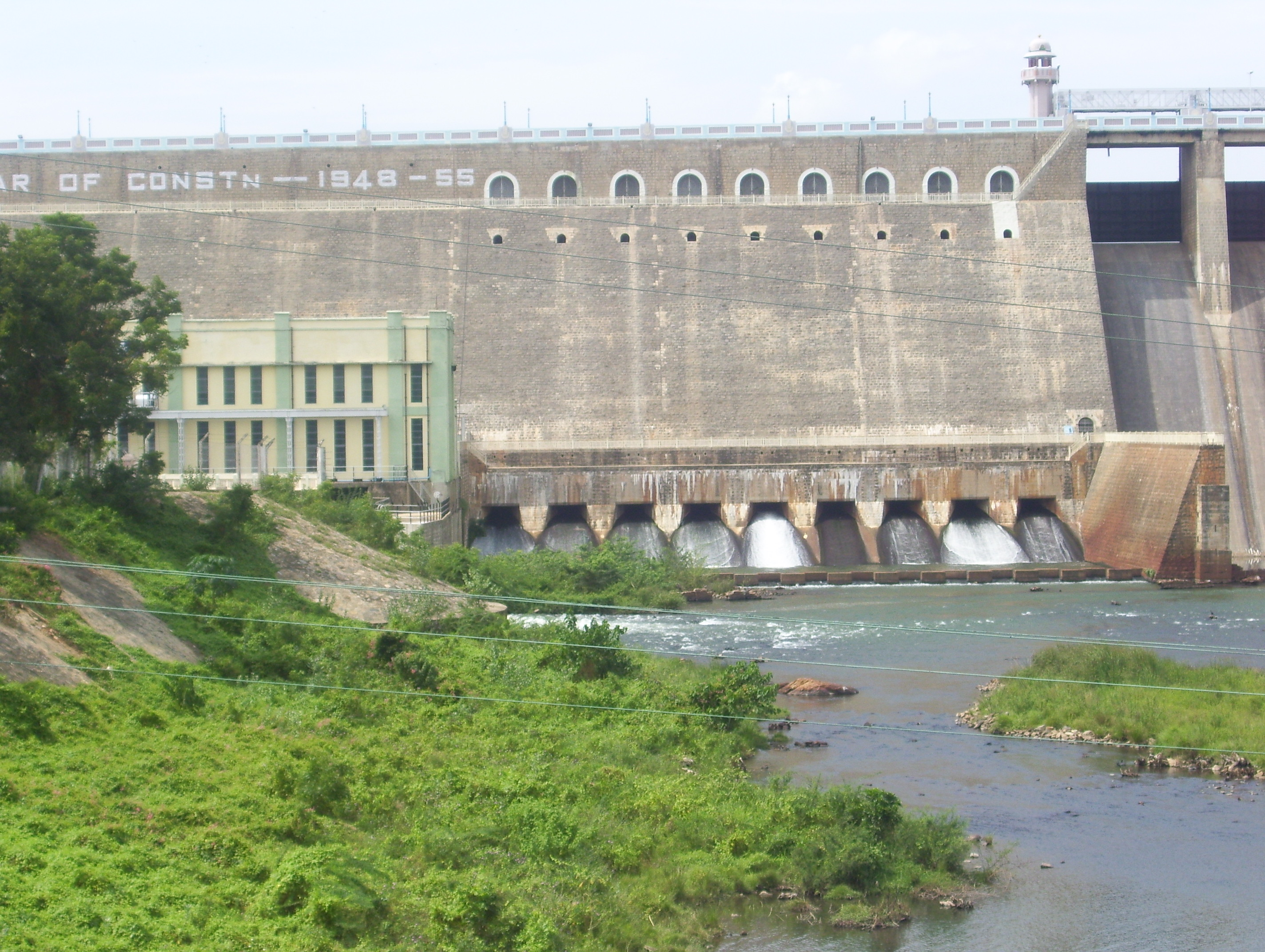
- Bhavanisagar Dam located near the town

- Bhavanisagar, Tamil Nadu
- Coordinates: 11°28′45.1″N 77°08′02.8″E
- Country: India
- State: Tamil Nadu
- District: Erode

Area
  - Total: 5.83 km^{2} (2.25 sq mi)
- Elevation: 285 m (935 ft)

Population (2011)
  - Total: 7,710
  - Density: 1,320/km^{2} (3,430/sq mi)

Languages
  - Official: Tamil
- Time zone: UTC+5:30 (IST)
- Vehicle registration: TN-36

Bhavanisagar is a panchayat town in Sathyamangalam taluk of Erode district in the Indian state of Tamil Nadu. It is located in the north-western part of the state. Spread across an area of 5.83 km^{2} (2.25 sq mi), it had a population of 7,710 individuals as per the 2011 census.

== Geography and administration ==
Bhavanisagar is located in Sathyamangalam taluk, Gobichettipalayam division of Erode district in the Indian state of Tamil Nadu. Spread across an area of 7.44 km^{2} (2.87 sq mi), it is one of the 42 panchayat towns in the district. It is located in the north-western part of the state towards the southern end of the Indian peninsula. The Bhavanisagar Dam is located on the Bhavani River near the town.

The town panchayat is headed by a chairperson, who is elected by the members, who are chosen through direct elections. The town forms part of the Bhavanisagar Assembly constituency that elects its member to the Tamil Nadu legislative assembly and the Nilgiris Lok Sabha constituency that elects its member to the Parliament of India.

== Demographics ==
As per the 2011 census, Bhavanisagar had a population of 7,710 individuals across 2134 households. The population saw a significant increase compared to the previous census in 2001 when 4,329 inhabitants were registered. The population consisted of 3,893 males and 3,817 females. The entire population is classified as urban. The town has an average literacy rate of 81.3%. About 13.7% of the population belonged to scheduled castes.

About 52% of the eligible population were employed. Hinduism was the majority religion which was followed by 85% of the population, with Christianity (13.4%) and Islam (1.4%) being minor religions. The town also hosts a refugee camp for Srilankan Tamils, who emigrated from Sri Lanka.
