= Kalingarayan =

Chieftain

- Chieftain of Kongu Nadu
- Born: Lingaya Gounder; 1240 CE
- Religion: Hinduism

Kalingarayan was a chieftain who ruled in the Kongu Nadu region of the present day Western Tamil Nadu under Pandya Empire in 13th century CE.

== Birth and history ==
Kalingarayan was born as Lingaya Gounder in the dominant Kongu Vettuva Gounder community a subcaste of Vettuva Gounder community in the western Tamil Nadu in 1240 CE. He independently ruled the Kongu Nadu region until it came under the influence of the Pandyas. Jatavarman Sundara Pandyan I annexed the Kongu Nadu region and Jatavarman Vira Pandyan II appointed Lingaya Gounder as a chieftain and granted him the title 'Kalingarayan'. The Zamindars of Zamin Uthukuli in Coimbatore district are the descendants of Nanjaya Gounder, the son of a concubine of Kalingarayar II. He usurped the kingdom from his legitimate step brother who was the crown prince and became the ruler of Uthukuli in the 16th century. Nanjaya Gounder was the illegitimate son of Kalingaraya Gounder II and a concubine named Sellakula Manikki, who belonged to the Sadhandhai kulam of the Kongu Vellalar caste but became a dancing girl under the Sella kulam of the same caste due to the fact that Sadhandhai kulam lost their hereditary kani rights and honour to Sella kulam after a scuffle in which Sadhandhai kulam agreed to send one of their women, a young girl named Ponni to serve the Sella kulam as a Manikki. Later the Uthukuli chieftain Kalingarayar Gounder II, enamoured by her beauty, bought her and made her his chief concubine.

== Anicut and canal ==
Kalingarayan constructed a barrage on the Bhavani River and a 56.2-mile (90.5 km) long Kalingarayan Canal to connect Bhavani River with Noyyal River. The project was one of the oldest irrigation projects in India and irrigates 15,743 acres (6,371 ha)s of agricultural land. The project including construction of the dam and canal started in 1271 and was completed in 1283.

== Legacy ==
In 2017, Government of Tamil Nadu planned to construct a memorial for Kalingarayan. In 2017, a memorial hall and statue of Kalingarayan was inaugurated by then Chief Minister of Tamil Nadu Palaniswami. The 5th day of Tamil month of Thai is celebrated as 'Kalingarayar day' every year.
