= Salangapalayam =

- Panchayat town
- Location in Tamil Nadu, India
- Coordinates: 11°24′40″N 77°33′47″E
- Country: India
- State: Tamil Nadu
- District: Erode

Area
  - Total: 24.24 km^{2} (9.36 sq mi)

Population (2011)
  - Total: 15,609
  - Density: 643.9/km^{2} (1,668/sq mi)

Languages
  - Official: Tamil
- Time zone: UTC+5:30 (IST)

Salangapalayam is a panchayat town in Bhavani taluk of Erode district in the Indian state of Tamil Nadu. It is located in the north-western part of the state. Spread across an area of 24.24 km^{2} (9.36 sq mi), it had a population of 15,609 individuals as per the 2011 census.

== Geography and administration ==
Salangapalayam is located in Bhavani taluk, Gobichettipalayam division of Erode district in the Indian state of Tamil Nadu. Spread across an area of 24.24 km^{2} (9.36 sq mi), it is one of the 42 panchayat towns in the district. It is located in the north-western part of the state.

The town panchayat is headed by a chairperson, who is elected by the members, who are chosen through direct elections. The town forms part of the Bhavani Assembly constituency that elects its member to the Tamil Nadu legislative assembly and the Tiruppur Lok Sabha constituency that elects its member to the Parliament of India.

== Demographics ==
As per the 2011 census, Salangapalayam had a population of 15,609 individuals across 4,668 households. The population saw an increase compared to the previous census in 2001 when 14,702 inhabitants were registered. The population consisted of 7,853 males and 7,756 females. About 1,215 individuals were below the age of six years. The entire population is classified as urban. The town has an average literacy rate of 65.3%. About 9.7% of the population belonged to scheduled castes.

About 64.6% of the eligible population were employed. Hinduism was the majority religion which was followed by 99.5% of the population, with Christianity (0.3%) and Islam (0.2%) being minor religions.
