= Ayyampalayam, Karur =

Coordinates: 11°02′24″N 77°51′13″E

Ayyampalayam is a village which comes under Punjai Thottakurichi town Panchayat, in Karur district in the Indian state of Tamil Nadu. This village mainly depends upon agriculture.
