= Kanjikoil =

Kanjikovil
- Panchayat town
- Location in Tamil Nadu, India
- Coordinates: 11°22′10″N 77°35′48″E
- Country: India
- State: Tamil Nadu
- District: Erode

Area
  - Total: 24 km^{2} (9.3 sq mi)

Population (2011)
  - Total: 11,294
  - Density: 470/km^{2} (1,200/sq mi)

Languages
  - Official: Tamil
- Time zone: UTC+5:30 (IST)
- Vehicle registration: TN-56

Kanjikoil is a panchayat town in Perundurai taluk of Erode district in the Indian state of Tamil Nadu. It is located in the north-western part of the state. Spread across an area of 24 km^{2} (9.3 sq mi), it had a population of 11,294 individuals as per the 2011 census.

== Geography and administration ==
Kanjikovil is located in Perundurai taluk, Erode division of Erode district in the Indian state of Tamil Nadu. Spread across an area of 24 km^{2} (9.3 sq mi), it is one of the 42 panchayat towns in the district. It is located in the north-western part of the state towards the southern end of the Indian peninsula. The Muthugoundanpalayam tank covers about 3 acres (1.2 ha), and servers as a major water source for the town.

The town panchayat is headed by a chairperson, who is elected by the members, who are chosen through direct elections. The town forms part of the Perundurai Assembly constituency that elects its member to the Tamil Nadu legislative assembly and the Tiruppur Lok Sabha constituency that elects its member to the Parliament of India.

== Demographics ==
As per the 2011 census, Kanjikovil had a population of 11,294 individuals. The population saw a marginal increase compared to the previous census in 2001 when 11,040 inhabitants were registered. The population consisted of 5,585 males and 5,709 females. The entire population is classified as urban. The town has an average literacy rate of 70.3%. About 20.6% of the population belonged to scheduled castes.

About 58.8% of the eligible population were employed. The economy is predominantly dependent on agriculture. Hinduism was the majority religion which was followed by 94.8% of the population, with Islam (5.0%) and Christianity (0.2%) being minor religions. The Seetha devi Amman temple is a major religious site in the region.
