= Erode taluk =

Indian administrative district

Coordinates: 11°21′N 77°44′E

Erode taluk is a taluk of Erode district of the Indian state of Tamil Nadu. The headquarters of the taluk is the town of Erode. In 2016, Erode Taluk has been trifurcated into Erode, Modakurichi and Kodumudi. It falls under Erode Revenue Division.

== Demographics ==
According to the 2011 census, the taluk of Erode had a population of 820,720 with 410,323 males and 410,397 females. There were 1,000 women for every 1,000 men. The taluk had a literacy rate of 73.5%. Child population in the age group below 6 years were 35,016 Males and 33,498 Females.

After trifurcation of the taluk, the present Erode taluk has a population of around 558,074 (as per census 2011). So there is a proposal and request to further bifurcate the Erode taluk into Erode North and Erode South.

== Populated places ==
- Erode Municipal Corporation
- Chittode
- Nasiyanur
