= Government Museum, Erode =

- Established: 1987; 39 years ago
- Location: VOC Park, Erode, Tamil Nadu, India
- Coordinates: 11.3517°N 77.7191°E
- Type: Archaeological Museum
- Accreditation: Ministry of Culture (India)
- Collections: 1500
- Directors: Principal Secretary & Commissioner of Museums
- Owner: Government of Tamil Nadu
- Public transit access: Central Bus Terminus

The Government Museum, Erode is an archaeological museum located in the city of Erode, Tamil Nadu. It is located inside the VOC Park campus, 200 meters to the north of Erode Central Bus Terminus and 3 km from Erode Junction.

== Exhibits ==
The museum exhibits a range of collections under nine categorizations namely Arts, Archaeology, Anthropology, Numismatics, Philately, Botany, Zoology and Geology. It is one of the prominent places of display for the inscriptions of Kongu Chozha Kingdom. The gallery has extensive collections including hero stones from Bargur, Tanjore paintings, palm-leaf manuscripts and coins. Antiques and urls from Kodumanal Archaeological excavations and other pre-historic items were also exhibited. Apart from the historical artifacts and handicrafts, several botanical and zoological specimens also find a place in the display.
