= Lower Bhavani Project Canal =

Irrigation canal in India

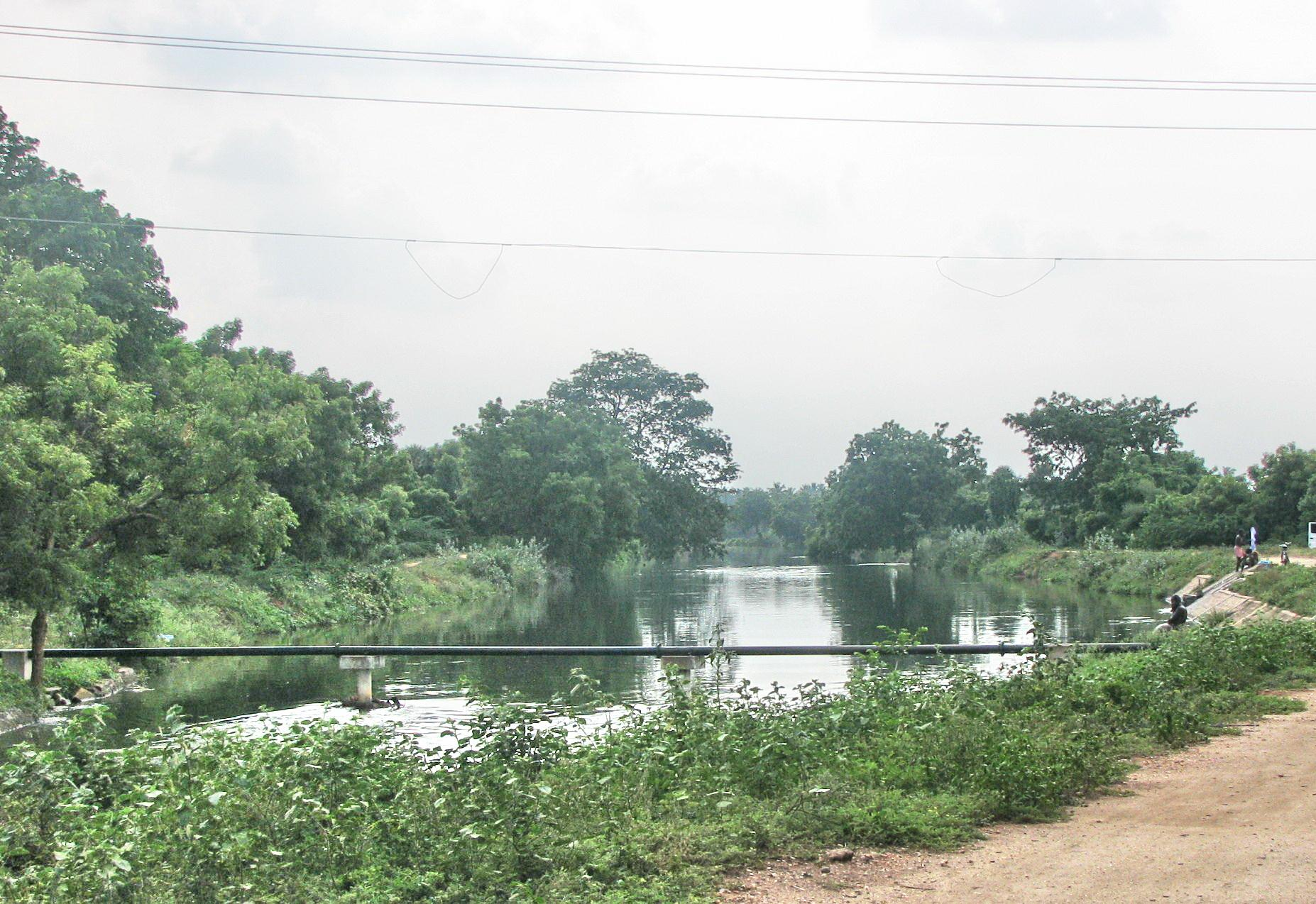
- Canal near Perundurai

Specifications
- Length: 125 miles (201 km)
- Status: open

Geography
- Branches: Thadapalli channel Arakankottai channel
- Branch of: Bhavani River

Lower Bhavani Project Canal is a 201-kilometre (125 mi) long irrigation canal which runs in Erode district in Tamil Nadu, India. The canal is a valley-side contour canal, fed by Bhavanisagar Dam and irrigates 2.07 lakh hectares of land. The main canal feeds Thadapalli and Arakkankottai channels which irrigate the cultivable lands. The canal was the brainchild M.A Eswaran, member of the legislative assembly of the Erode constituency in the early 1950s.

== Opposition to Concrete Lining ==
In 2013, the government of Tamil Nadu took up the project of the concrete lining of the LBP canal, however, it was dropped after farmers heavily opposed it. Now again after several years, the government has planned to start this project, by just referring to renovation works which include concrete lining. According to many farmers, if the project gets started, it will severely affect the recharge of underground water, thereby posing a serious threat to the whole agriculture ecosystem and domestic water supply system and directly affecting lakhs of farmers and ordinary citizens living in the districts of Erode, Tiruppur and Karur. According to them, groundwater will not be replenished and the entire region will be turned into a desert.

Some farmers support concrete lining, but majority of farmers living in this region oppose concrete lining. These districts receive low rainfall and are classified as semi-arid regions and this canal is the only source of water for all the people living here. Several Panchayats and Municipalities depend on this canal for domestic water supply. Massive demonstrations and protests were also held against this concrete lining.

== See also ==
- Kalingarayan Canal
