= Elumathur =

Township in Tamil Nadu

Elumathur is a township in the Indian state of Tamil Nadu. It is located 19 km south of Erode, in the western part of Tamil Nadu.

The native language is Tamil.

== Governance ==
Elumathur is part of the Modakkurichi constituency. Elections for the legislative assembly are held every five years. It is a part of the Erode constituency that votes for parliamentary elections. It is a part of a gram panchayat. Elections are held every five years for panchayat president.

https://findmygov.in/en/tamil-nadu/erode/modakurichi-block/elumathur

Small villages located in Elumathur panchayat include Mosuvan Palli, Avvalur, Pudhupalayam, Kaarakaattu Valasu, Muthuiayan Valasu, Aathikaattu Valasu, and Mettupalayam.

== Culture ==
Cultural practices resemble those in other parts of Tamil Nadu. The majority of the people are Hindus, while Christians and Muslims constitute minor proportions.

== Demographics ==
As of the 2011 Population Census, the population of Elumathur was 8929: 4389 males and 4540 females among a total of 2712 families. 726 children were age 6 and under, comprising 8.13 8.13% of the total population.

The percentage of people below the poverty line is around 3%, much lower than the national average of 29.8% and the state average of 17.1%.

== Economy ==
The primary occupation is agriculture. For cultivation, farmers depend on water resources from Bhavani Sagar and Mettur dam. The soil is predominantly black, along with some red loamy soil.
