= Bhavanisagar Dam =

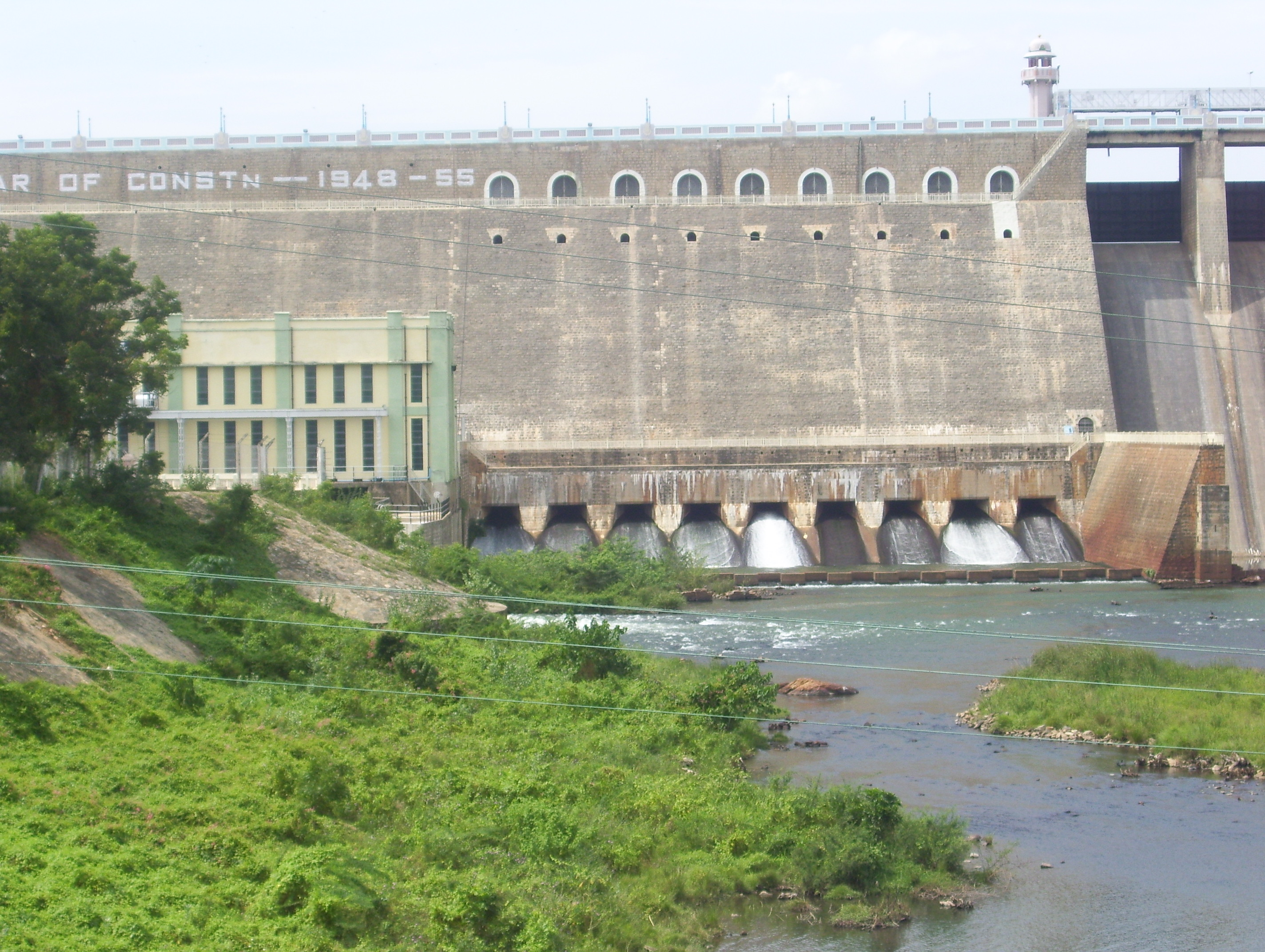
- Bhavanisagar Dam and Reservoir
- Interactive map of Bhavanisagar Dam
- Official name: Lower Bhavani Dam
- Location: Bhavanisagar, Erode, Tamil Nadu, India
- Coordinates: 11°28′15″N 77°6′50″E
- Purpose: irrigation, power
- Status: open
- Construction began: 1948
- Opening date: 1955
- Construction cost: ₹210 million (US$2.5 million)
- Owner: Government of Tamil Nadu
- Operator: Government of Tamil Nadu

Dam and spillways
- Type of dam: earthen
- Impounds: Bhavani River
- Height (foundation): 40 m (130 ft)
- Height (thalweg): 120 ft (37 m)
- Length: 8 km (5.0 mi)

Reservoir
- Creates: Bhavanisagar Reservoir
- Total capacity: 32.8×10^{9} cu ft (930×10^{6} m^{3})

Power Station
- Turbines: Lower Bhavani -1 4x2 MW = 8 MW; Lower Bhavani RBC (Right Bank Cannel) = 2x4 MW = 8 MW
- Installed capacity: 16 MW (21,000 hp)

Bhavanisagar Dam or Lower Bhavani Dam, is an earthen dam located in Erode district in the Indian state of Tamil Nadu. The dam is constructed on the Bhavani River. The dam is situated some 16 km (9.9 mi) west of Sathyamangalam, and is 35 km (22 mi) from Gobichettipalayam in Erode district.

== History ==
The Lower Bhavani Project was the first major irrigation project initiated in India, after independence, in 1948. It was completed by 1955 and opened for use in 1956. M. A. Eswaran played a key role in getting the government approval for the construction of the dam. The dam was constructed at a cost of ₹210 million (US$2.5 million).

== Dimensions ==
The dam is 9 km (5.6 mi) long by 40 m (130 ft) high. The full reservoir level is 120 ft (37 m) and the dam has a gross storage capacity of 32.8×10^{9} cu ft (930×10^{6} m^{3}) or 32.81 Tmcft

== Hydrography ==
Bhavanisagar dam is constructed on the Bhavani River. The dam receives water from two main catchment areas in the Western Ghats. The water is fed into the Bhavani River known as Upper Bhavani. The eastern catchment area includes the Upper Bhavani, Avalanche and Emerald lakes, Kundha, Gedhai, Pillur and Nellithurai . The western catchment area includes Portimund, Parson's valley, Pykara, Glenmorgan, Singara, Maravakandy, Moyar and Thengumarahada. The dam is fed by both Southwest and Northeast monsoons.

The dam feeds water into two canals, Lower Bhavani Project Canal and Kalingarayan Canal. The Kalingarayan canal feeds Thadapalli and Arakkankottai channels and the LBP canal feeds the Thadapalli and Arakankottai channels.

Canal	Ayacut area
Lower Bhavani Project Canal	103 thousand acres (420 km^{2})
Kalingarayan Canal	15.743 thousand acres (63.71 km^{2})
Thadapalli and Arakankottai	24.504 thousand acres (99.16 km^{2})

== Power generation ==
The dam has two hydroelectric power stations, one on the east bank canal and the other on the Bhavani River. Each has a capacity of 8 megawatts (11,000 hp) for a total capacity of 16 megawatts (21,000 hp).

== See also ==
- List of dams and reservoirs in India
