= River linking =

Project of linking two or more rivers

River linking is a project of linking two or more rivers by creating a network of manually created reservoirs and canals, and providing land areas that otherwise does not have river water access and reducing the flow of water to sea using this means. It is based on the assumptions that surplus water in some rivers can be diverted to deficit rivers by creating a network of canals to interconnect the rivers.

== Reasons and motivations ==
For an instance, in India the rainfall over the country is primarily orographic, associated with tropical depressions originating in the Arabian Sea and the Bay of Bengal. The summer monsoon accounts for more than 85 per cent of the precipitation. The uncertainty of occurrence of rainfall marked by prolonged dry spells and fluctuations in seasonal and annual rainfall is a serious problem for the country. Large parts of Haryana, Maharashtra, Andhra Pradesh, Rajasthan, Gujarat, Madhya Pradesh, Karnataka and Tamil Nadu are not only in deficit in rainfall but also subject to large variations, resulting in frequent droughts and causing immense hardship to the population and enormous loss to the nation. The water availability even for drinking purposes becomes critical, particularly in the summer months as the rivers dry up and the ground water recedes. Regional variations in the rainfall lead to situations when some parts of the country do not have enough water even for raising a single crop. On the other hand, excess rainfall occurring in some parts of the country creates havoc due to floods.

Irrigation using river water and ground water has been the prime factor for raising the food grain production in India from a mere 50 million tonnes in the 1950s to more than 200 million tonnes at present, leading India to attain self-sufficiency in food. Irrigated area has increased from 22 million hectares to 95 million hectares during this period. The population of India, which is around 1100 million at present, is expected to increase to 1500 to 1800 million in the year 2050 and that would require about 450 million tonnes of food grains. For meeting this requirement, it would be necessary to increase irrigation potential to 160 million hectares for all crops by 2050. India's maximum irrigation potential that could be created through conventional sources has been assessed to be about 140 million hectares. For attaining a potential of 160 million hectares, other strategies shall have to be evolved.

Floods are a recurring feature, particularly by the Brahmaputra and Ganga rivers, in which almost 60 per cent of the river flows of India occur. Flood damages, which were Rs. 52 crores in 1953, have gone up to Rs. 5,846 crores in 1998 with annual average being Rs. 1,343 crores affecting the States of Assam, Bihar, West Bengal and Uttar Pradesh along with untold human sufferings. On the other hand, large areas in the States of Rajasthan, Gujarat, Andhra Pradesh, Karnataka and Tamil Nadu face recurring droughts. As much as 85 percentage of drought prone area falls in these States. One of the most effective ways to increase the irrigation potential for increasing the food grain production, mitigating floods and droughts and reducing regional imbalance in the availability of water is the Inter Basin Water Transfer (IBWT) from the surplus rivers to deficit areas. Brahmaputra and Ganga particularly their northern tributaries, Mahanadi, Godavari and West Flowing Rivers originating from the Western Ghats are found to be surplus in water resources. If we can build storage reservoirs on these rivers and connect them to other parts of the country, regional imbalances could be reduced significantly and lot of benefits could be gained by way of additional irrigation, domestic and industrial water supply, hydropower generation, navigational facilities etc.

== Benefits ==
=== Irrigation ===
By linking the rivers, vast amount of land areas which will not otherwise be irrigated and are unusable for agriculture become fertile.

=== Flood prevention ===
During heavy rainy seasons some areas can experience heavy floods while other areas might be experiencing drought like situations. With network of rivers this problem can be greatly avoided by channeling excess water to areas that are not experiencing a flood or are dry.

=== Generation of electricity ===
With new canals built, feasibility of new dams to generate hydroelectric power becomes a possibility.

=== Transportation ===
Newly created network of canals opens up new routes and ways of water navigation, which is generally more efficient and cheaper compared to road transport.

== National River Linking Project in India ==
The National River Linking Project (NRLP) is designed to ease water shortages in western and southern India while mitigating the impacts of recurrent floods in the eastern parts of the Ganga basin. The NRLP, if and when implemented, will be one of the biggest interbasin water transfer projects in the world.

=== Aqua life ===
A number of leading environmentalists are of the opinion that the project could be an ecological disaster. There would be a decrease in downstream flows resulting in reduction of fresh water inflows into the seas seriously jeopardizing aquatic life.

=== Deforestation ===
Creation of canals would need large areas of land resulting in large scale deforestation in certain areas.

=== Areas getting submerged ===
Possibility of new dams comes with the threat of large otherwise habitable or reserved land getting submerged under water or surface water.

=== Displacement of people ===
As large strips of land might have to be converted to canals, a considerable population living in these areas must need to be rehabilitated to new areas.

=== Dirtying of clean water ===
As the rivers interlink, rivers with dirty water will get connect to rivers with clean water, hence dirtying the clean water.
