= Chithode =

Neighbourhood in Tamil Nadu, India

Chittode
- Panchayat town
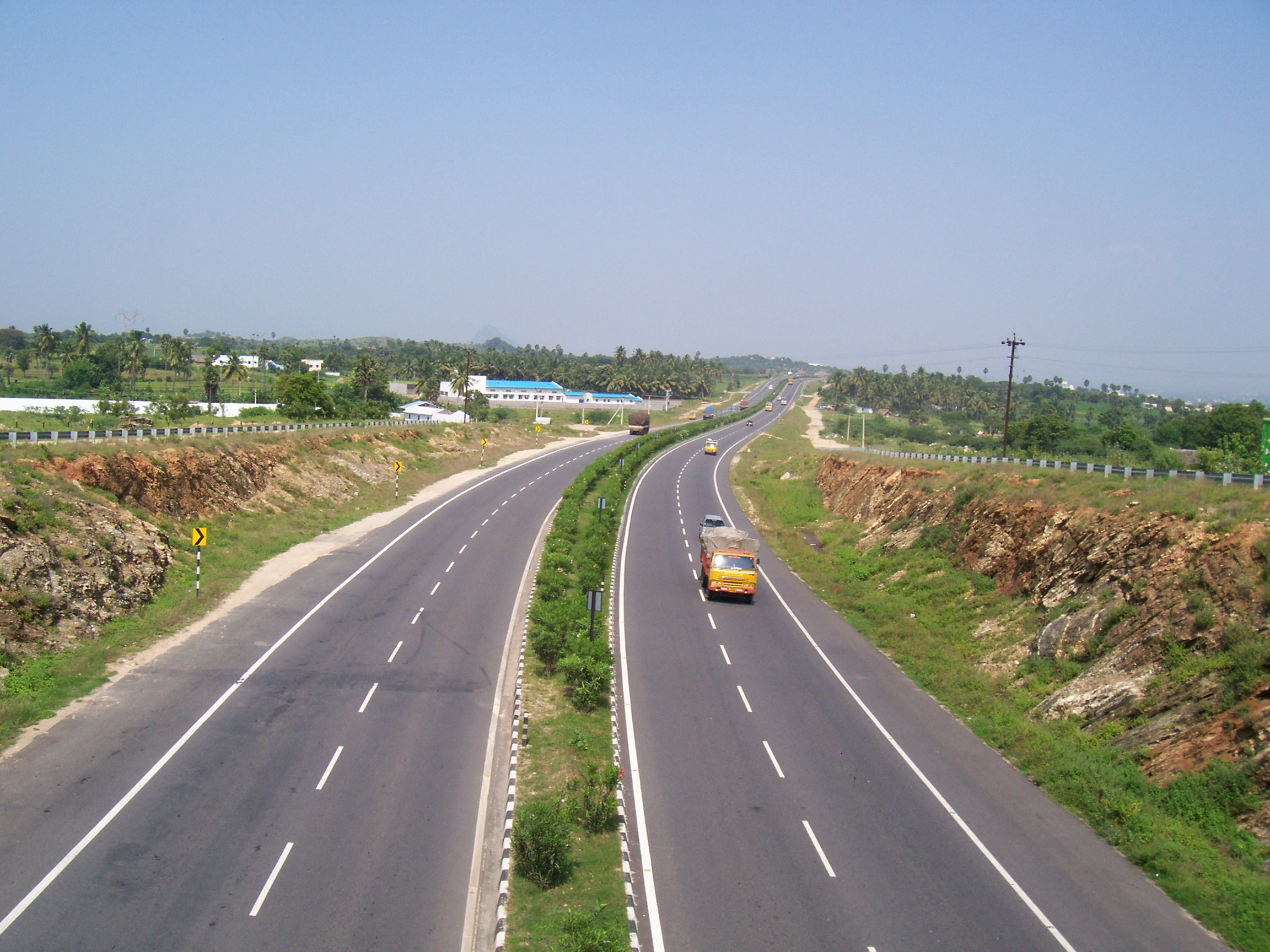
- National Highway 544 passing through Chithode

- Location within Tamil Nadu
- Coordinates: 11°24′34″N 77°39′1″E
- Country: India
- State: Tamil Nadu
- District: Erode
- Taluk: Erode

Area
  - Total: 3.6 km^{2} (1.4 sq mi)

Population (2011)
  - Total: 8,550
- Postal code: 638107

Chithode is a panchayat town in Erode taluk of Erode district in the Indian state of Tamil Nadu. Spread across an area of 3.6 km^{2} (1.4 sq mi), it had a population of 8,550 individuals as per the 2011 census. It is located on the intersection of the National Highway 544 and State Highway 15 in the north-western part of the state.

== Geography and administration ==
Chithode is located in Erode taluk, Erode division of Erode district in the Indian state of Tamil Nadu. Spread across an area of 7.44 km^{2} (2.87 sq mi), it is one of the 42 panchayat towns in the district. It is located on the intersection of the National Highway 544 and State Highway 15 in the north-western part of the state towards the southern end of the Indian peninsula.

The town panchayat is headed by a chairperson, who is elected by the members, who are chosen through direct elections. The town forms part of the Erode West Assembly constituency that elects its member to the Tamil Nadu legislative assembly and the Erode Lok Sabha constituency that elects its member to the Parliament of India.

== Demographics ==
As per the 2011 census, Chithode had a population of 8,550 individuals across 2,553 households. The population saw a marginal increase compared to the previous census in 2001 when 7,704 inhabitants were registered. The population consisted of 4,261 males and 4,289 females. About 781 individuals were below the age of six years. The entire population is classified as urban. The town has an average literacy rate of 80%. About 89.4% of the population belonged to scheduled castes.

About 51.4% of the eligible population were employed. Hinduism was the majority religion which was followed by 97.2% of the population, with Christianity (1.6%) and Islam (1.2%) being minor religions. The Government College of Engineering, Erode is located at Chithode. The town also hosts a milk processing unit of Aavin.
