= Erode division =

Coordinates: 11°21′N 77°44′E

Erode division is one of the two revenue divisions in Erode district of Tamil Nadu, India. The revenue division includes 4 taluks.

They four taluks are

- Erode taluk
- Perundurai taluk
- Modakurichi taluk
- Kodumudi taluk

The population of Erode division is 11,34,765 with an area of 2,145sqkm.
