= Erode district =

- District
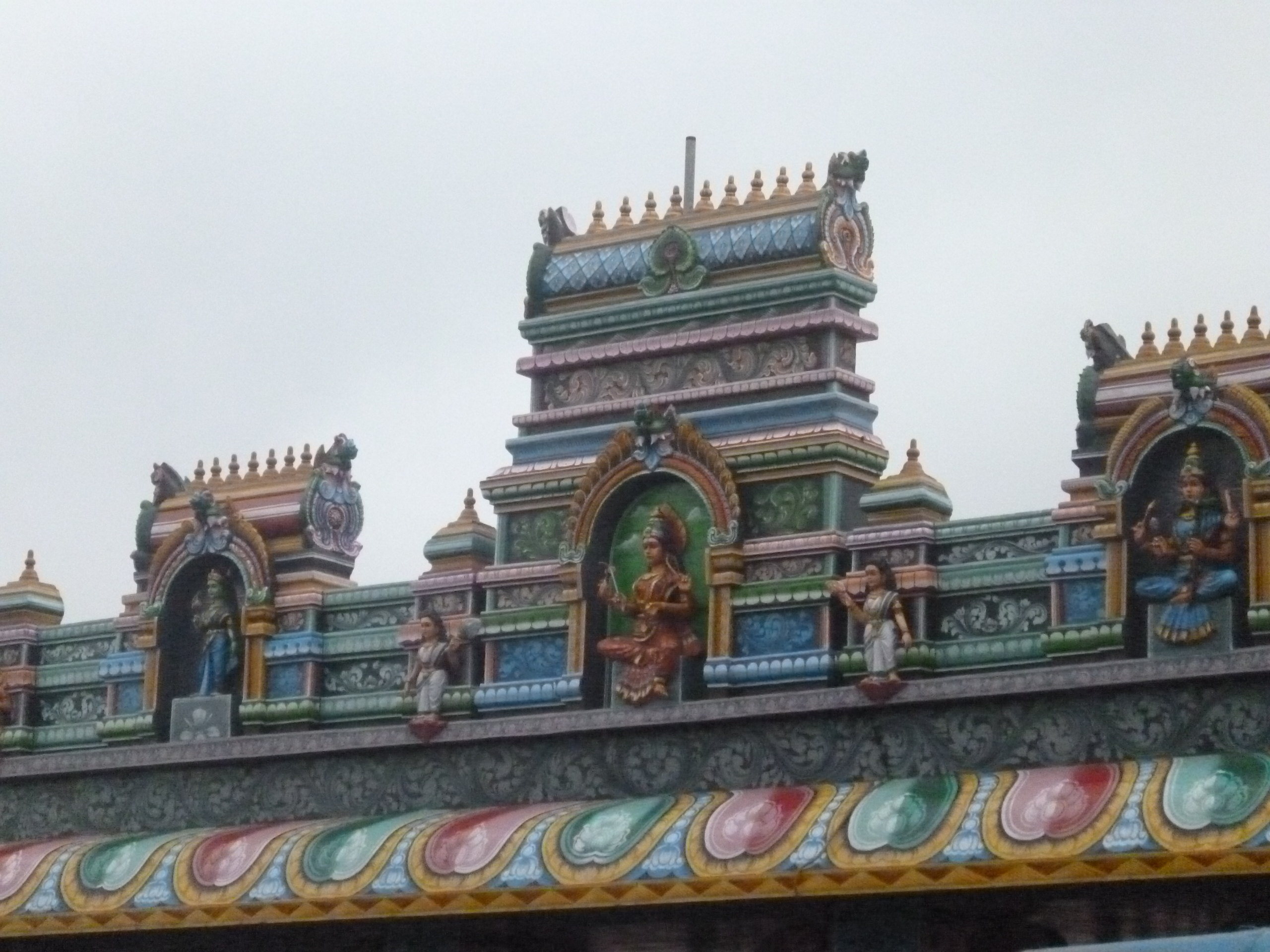
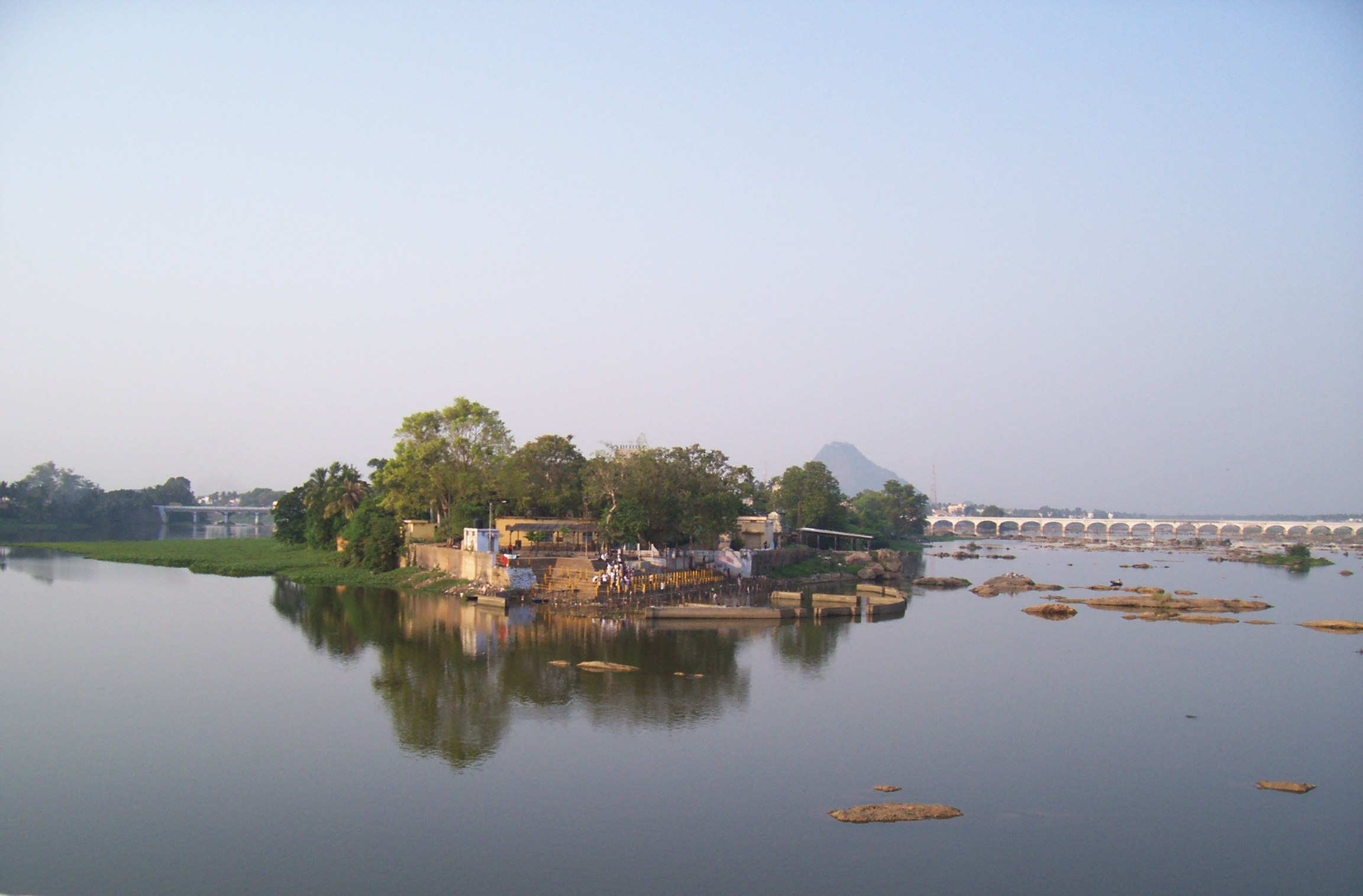
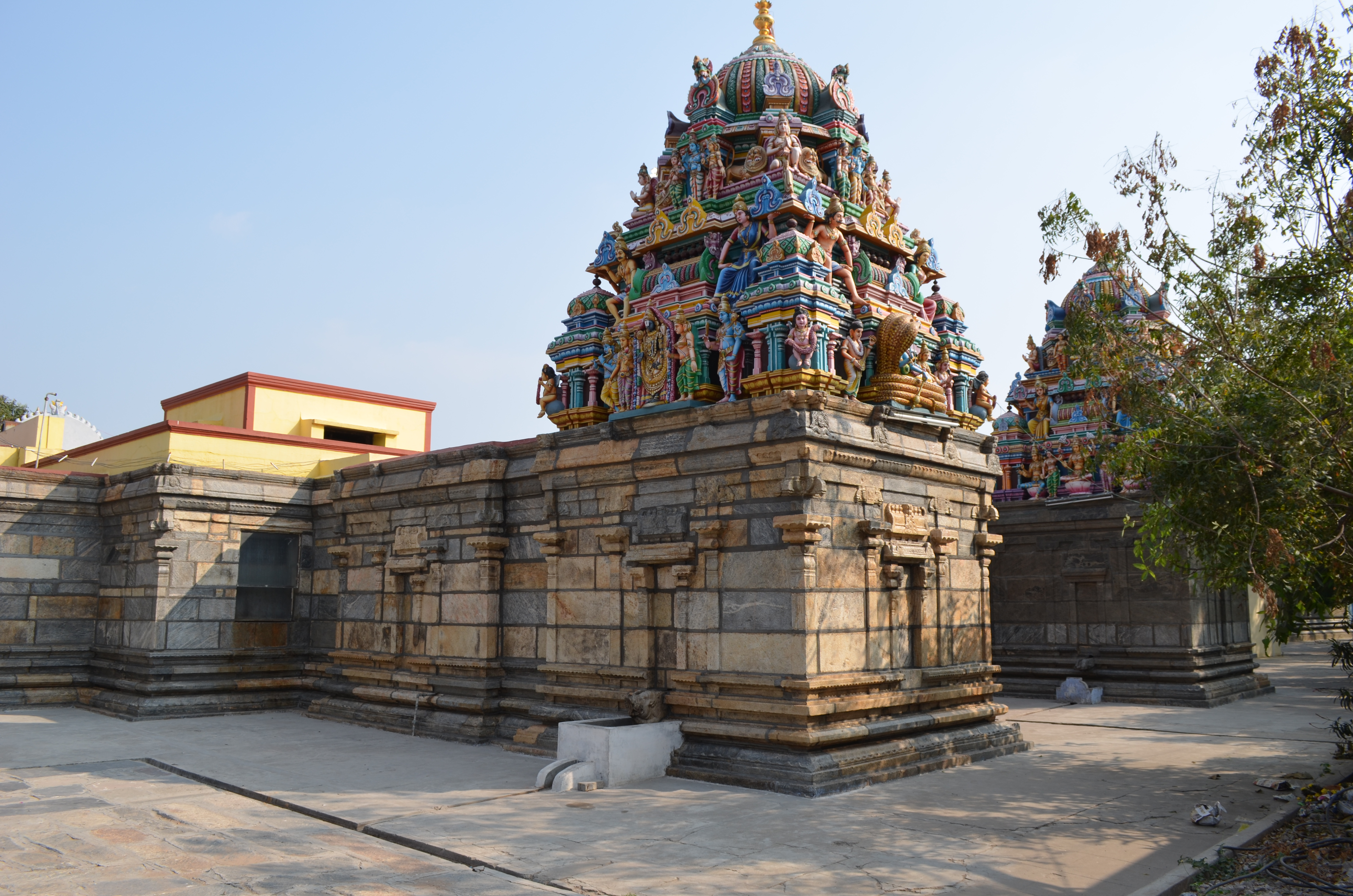
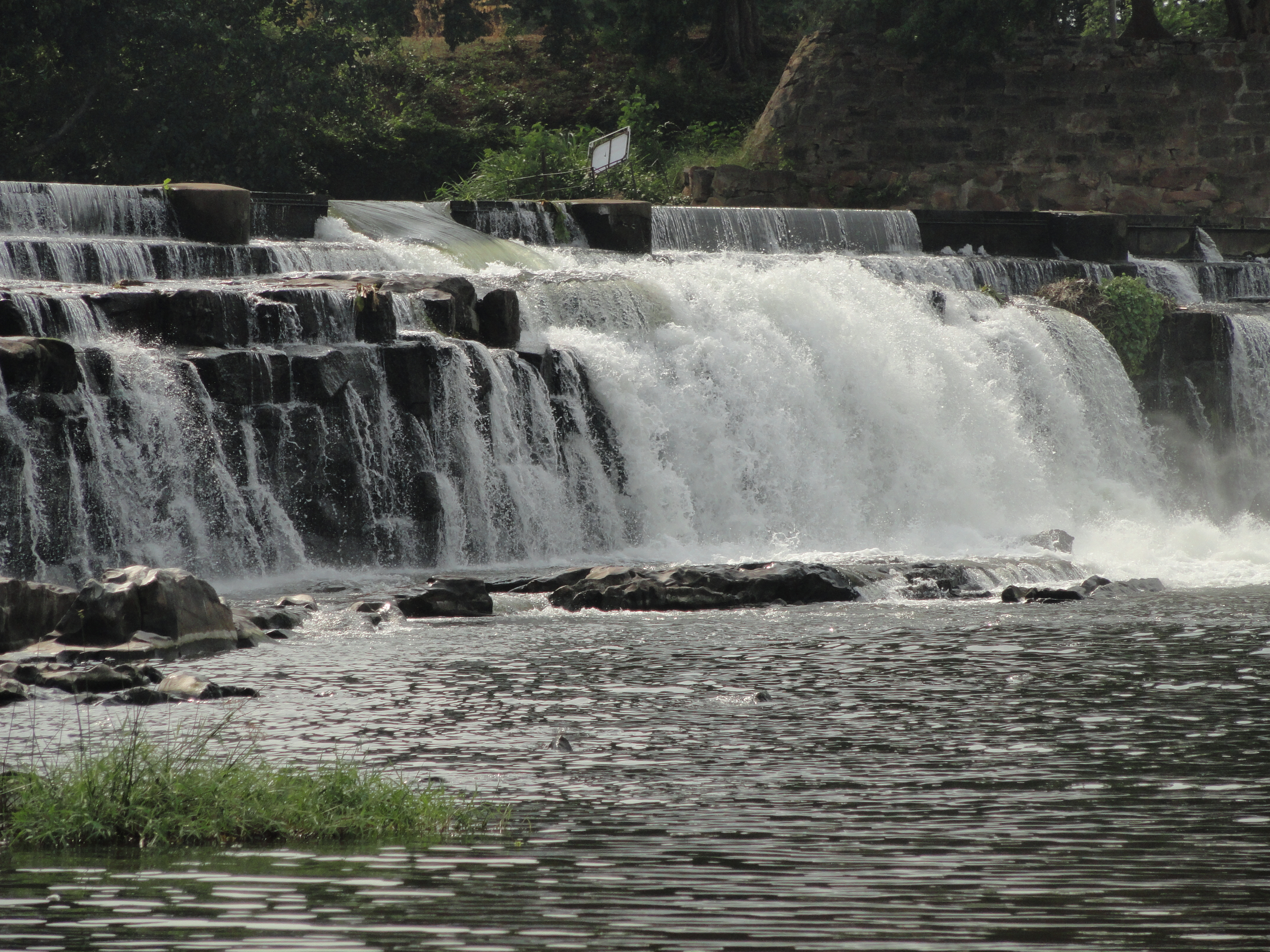
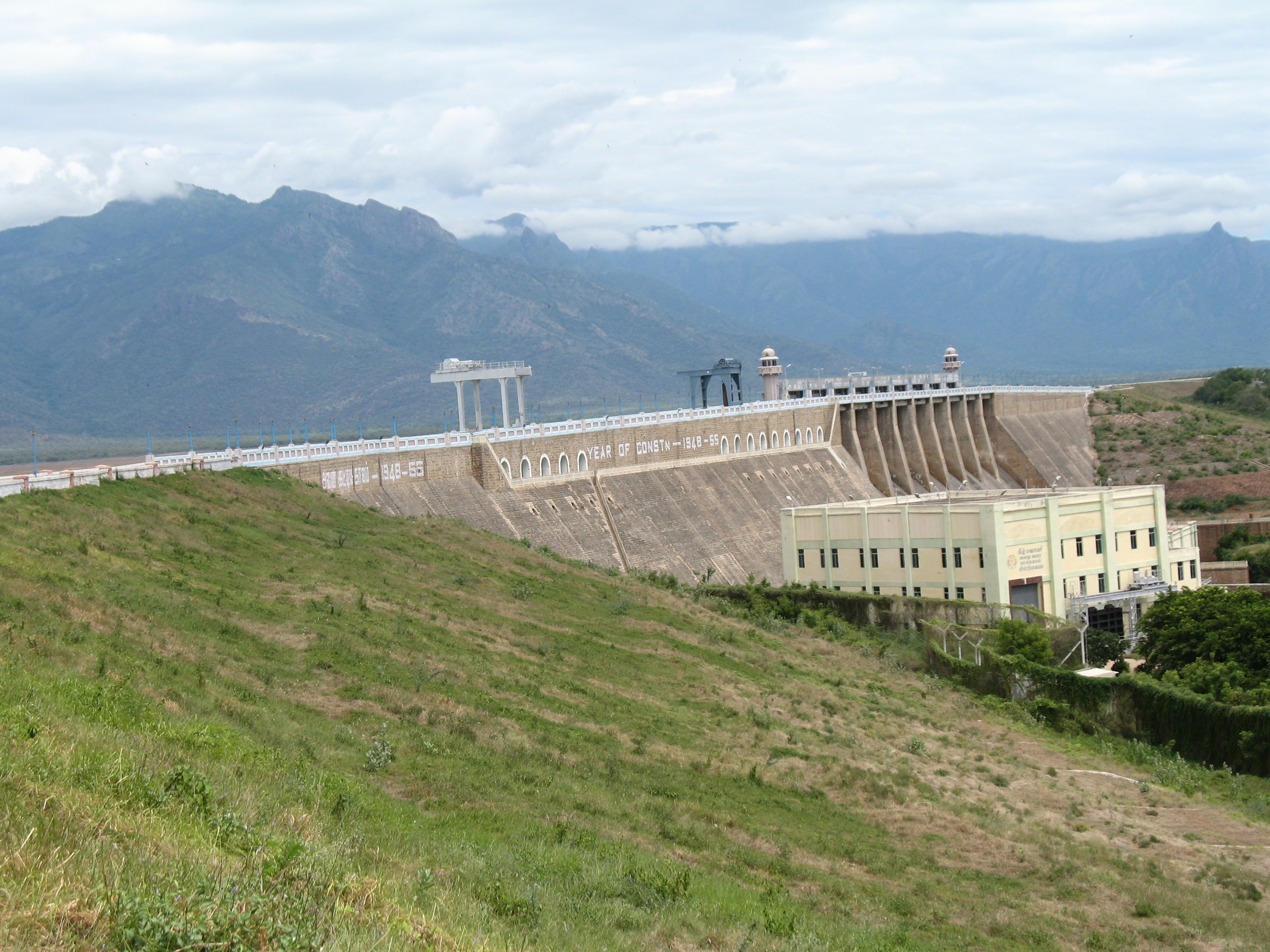
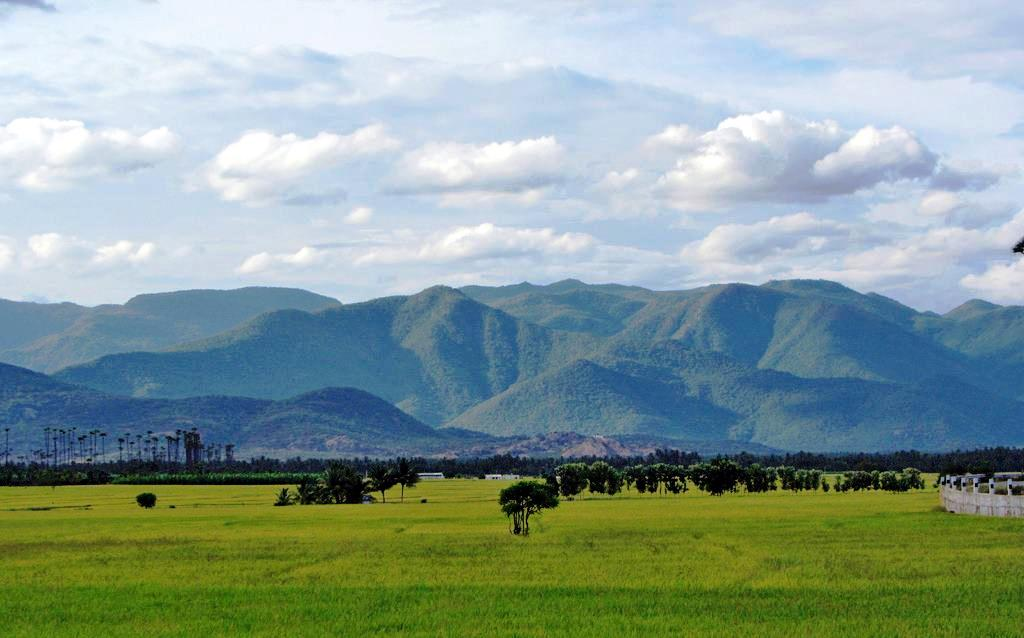
- Clockwise from top-left: Bannari Amman Temple, Bhavani Sangameswarar Temple, Bhavanisagar Dam, Eastern Ghats, Kodiveri dam, and confluence of the Bhavani and Kaveri Rivers
- Interactive map of Erode district
- Coordinates: 11°21′N 77°44′E
- Country: India
- State: Tamil Nadu
- Region: Kongu Nadu
- Established: 1979
- Headquarters: Erode
- Taluks: Anthiyur, Bhavani, Erode, Gobichettipalayam, Kodumudi, Modakurichi, Nambiyur, Perundurai, Sathyamangalam, Thalavadi

Government
  - District Collector: S. Kandasamy, IAS
  - Superintendent of Police: A Sujatha, IPS

Area
  - Total: 6,036 km^{2} (2,331 sq mi)

Population (2011)
  - Total: 2,251,744
  - Density: 394/km^{2} (1,020/sq mi)

Languages
  - Official: Tamil
- Time zone: UTC+5:30 (IST)
- PIN: 638***
- ISO 3166 code: ISO 3166-2:IN
- Vehicle registration: TN 33 (Erode East); TN 36 (Gobichettipalayam); TN 56 (Perundurai); TN 86 (Erode West)
- Largest city: Erode
- Sex ratio: 993/1000 ♀/♂
- Literacy: 72.96%
- Website: erode.nic.in

Erode district is one of the 38 districts in the south Indian state of Tamil Nadu. It was the largest district by area in the state before the formation of Tirupur district in 2009 and is the third largest by area, as of 2024. The headquarters of the district is Erode. The district is divided into two revenue divisions, Erode and Gobichettipalayam, and is further subdivided into 10 taluks.

The district is landlocked and lies towards the middle of the Indian peninsula and is bordered by the state of Karnataka to the north. The Eastern Ghats pass through the north-western part of the district, and the Western Ghats straddles the western edge. The district is watered by the Kaveri River which meets its major tributary Bhavani in the district. It covers an area of 6,036 km^{2} (2,331 sq mi), and had a population of 2,251,744 as per the 2011 census. The major spoken language is Kongu Tamil, a dialect of Tamil. Hinduism is the major religion with nearly 94% adherents.

Archeological evidence from Kodumanal indicate that the region was ruled by the Cheras during the Sangam period (2nd century BCE to third century CE) and it formed part of an ancient Roman trade route. The region was ruled by the Pandyas before the medieval Cholas conquered it in the tenth century. The region was ruled by Vijayanagara Empire in the fifteenth century followed by the Nayaks who introduced the Palayakkarar system. In the later part of the eighteenth century, the region came under the Kingdom of Mysore and after the Anglo-Mysore Wars, the British East India Company annexed the region to the Madras Presidency in 1799. The region played a prominent role in the Second Polygar War (1801) when it was the area of operations of Dheeran Chinnamalai. The district was part of the erstwhile Coimbatore district and came into existence on 17 September 1979.

The economy of the district is based predominantly on agriculture and textiles. The district is the top turmeric producer in Tamil Nadu, making up 43% of statewide production and is also a major producer of plantain, coconuts and white silk. The district is known for handloom and ready-made textile products. Erode Turmeric and Bhavani Jamakkalam are recognized Geographical Indications.

== History ==
Archaeological excavations from Kodumanal on the banks of the Noyyal River show traces of civilization from 4th century BCE. Kodumanal is mentioned in Patiṟṟuppattu literature from the first century CE as a thriving industrial and commercial center. The evidence indicates that the region was ruled by the Cheras during the Sangam period (2nd century BCE to 3rd century CE) and it formed part of an ancient Roman trade route. The region came under the influence of the Pandyas during the reign of Arikesari Maravarman in the seventh century CE. Later, the region was ruled by various dynasties such as Rashtrakutas and Western Gangas.

The medieval Cholas conquered the Kongu Nadu in the 10th century CE. While the region was directly under the control of the Imperial Cholas till 1064 CE, the Kongu Cholas who were probably vassals or viceroys of the Cholas, ruled the region autonomously later starting. These rulers bore the title Konattar and adopted Chola titles and surnames. In the 13th century CE, after the death of Vikrama Chola II, the Pandyas under Jatavarman Sundara Pandyan I annexed the region. The rule of the Pandyas came to an end with the death of Maravarman Kulasekara Pandyan I in 1318 CE. The Hoysalas ruled the region for sometime later with Vira Someshwara having a matrimonial alliance with both Pandyas and Cholas. After the defeat of Veera Ballala III of the Hoysalas, the region came under the control of the Vijayanagara Empire.

After the Vijayanagara empire fell in 1646, the region was ruled by various Nayak governors of the erstwhile Vijayanagara empire who declared independence. They introduced the Palayakkarar system under which the region was divided into 24 Palayams(towns). In the later part of the 18th century, the region came under the Kingdom of Mysore and after the Anglo-Mysore Wars, the British East India Company annexed the region to the Madras Presidency in 1799. The region played a prominent role in the Second Polygar War (1801) when it was the area of operations of Dheeran Chinnamalai. Later, the British Empire took control of the region from the British East India Company in 1857. After Indian Independence in 1947, the region was part of the Madras State, which later became Tamil Nadu. The district was part of the erstwhile Coimbatore district and came into existence on 17 September 1979.

== Geography ==
The district is landlocked, and is situated roughly at the center of the Indian Peninsula between latitude 10 36" and 11 58" north and between longitude 76 49" and 77 58" east. It is bordered by Chamarajanagar district of Karnataka in the north. To the east, across the Kaveri River, lies Salem and Namakkal districts. It is bordered by Karur district in the southeast, Tirupur district in the south with Coimbatore and Nilgiris districts in to the west.

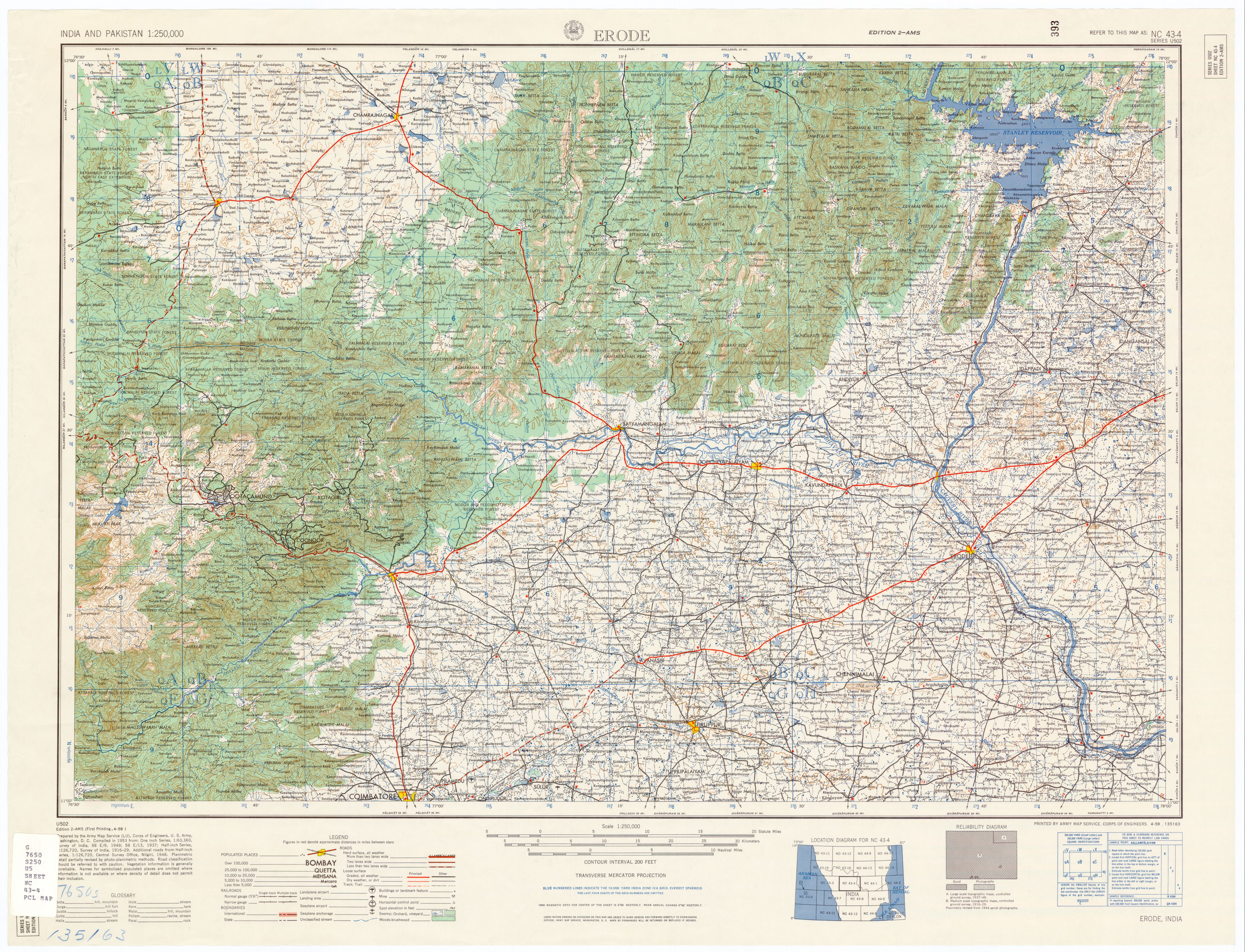
Map of the region c.1955

The topography of the district consists of plains sloping from rom north east to south west. The Eastern Ghats run through the north-western part of the district, and is straddled by the Western Ghats in the west, with the mountain ranges separated by the Moyar River. The region comprises the high altitude regions of the north sloping gently towards a long undulating plain in the south. Bhavani River cuts the district roughly in the middle, flowing from west to east. It enters the district at Sathyamangalam, crossing Gobichettipalayam taluk before joining the Kaveri River flowing from the north, near the eastern edge at Bhavani. The river feeds the Bhavanisagar reservoir and Kodiveri Dam are major dams, which along with a canal system provide irrigation and drainage for the district. The other major tributaries of the Kaveri including the Noyyal and Amaravati, emerge from the mountains in the west.

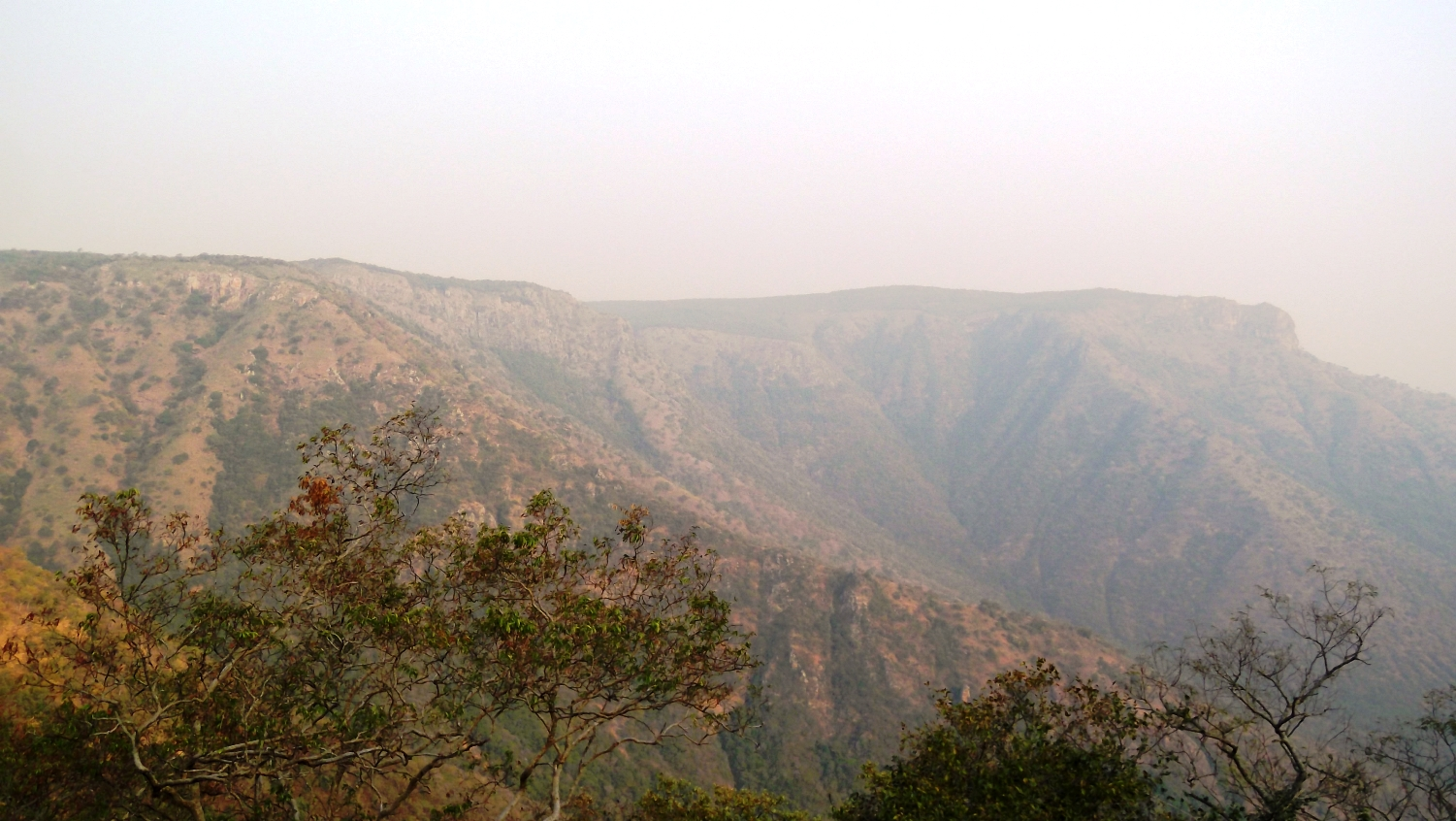
Sathyamangalam Tiger Reserve in the district

The region has a tropical climate and the climate is characterized by dry weather throughout the year, except during the monsoons. The region depends on monsoons for rainfall. In March, the temperature begins to rise, which persists until the end of May, with the highest temperatures recorded during the period. The average maximum temperature is 39 °C (102 °F) and the average minimum temperature is 21 °C (70 °F). The south-west monsoon winds passing through the Palghat gap loses most of its moisture when reaching the district and the region receives about 238 mm (9.4 in) of rainfall in the months from June to August from the south-west monsoon. After a warm and foggy September, the north-east monsoon starts from October, lasting until early November. The district gets most of its rainfall from the north-east monsoon, averaging about 287 mm (11.3 in) annually. The district gets a total average annual rainfall of 652 mm (25.7 in).

The major soil types found here are loamy soil and clay soil. The northern part of the district incorporating parts of Sathyamangalam and Gobichettipalayam taluks form the Sathyamangalam Tiger Reserve, part of Nilgiri Biosphere Reserve and is the largest protected area in Tamil Nadu. The region has one of the largest Indian Elephant and Bengal Tiger populations in the country.

== Demographics ==
Historical population
| Year | 1901 | 1911 | 1921 | 1931 | 1941 | 1951 | 1961 | 1971 | 1981 | 1991 | 2001 | 2011 |
| Pop. | 629,892 | 667,968 | 725,434 | 769,455 | 886,108 | 1,010,616 | 1,106,528 | 1,356,092 | 1,587,604 | 1,802,939 | 2,016,582 | 2,251,744 |
| ±% p.a. | — | +0.59% | +0.83% | +0.59% | +1.42% | +1.32% | +0.91% | +2.05% | +1.59% | +1.28% | +1.13% | +1.11% |

Religions in Erode district (2011)
| Religion | Percent |
| Hinduism | 93.95% |
| Islam | 3.38% |
| Christianity | 2.48% |
| Other or not stated | 0.19% |

According to the 2011 census, Erode District had a population of 2,251,744 with a sex-ratio of 993 females for every 1,000 males, above the national average of 929. A total of 195,213 were under the age of six, constituting 99,943 males and 95,270 females. Scheduled Castes and Scheduled Tribes accounted for 16.41% and 0.97% of the population, respectively. The literacy rate of the district was 66.29%, compared to the national average of 72.99%. The district had a total of 658,071 households. There were 1,195,773 workers: 173,376 cultivators, 331,414 main agricultural labourers, 48,960 in household industries, 557,301 other workers, 84,722 marginal workers, 38,798 marginal agricultural labourers, 5,362 marginal workers in household industries, 4,794 marginal cultivators and 35,768 other marginal workers.

As per the 2011 census, 81.76% of the population spoke Tamil, 10.32% Telugu, 5.40% Kannada and 1.14% Urdu as their first language. Kongu Tamil (also called Kangee or Kongalam), a dialect, is predominantly spoken in the district. As per the census, Hinduism was the predominant religion with nearly 94% adherents.

== Administration and politics ==
=== Administration ===
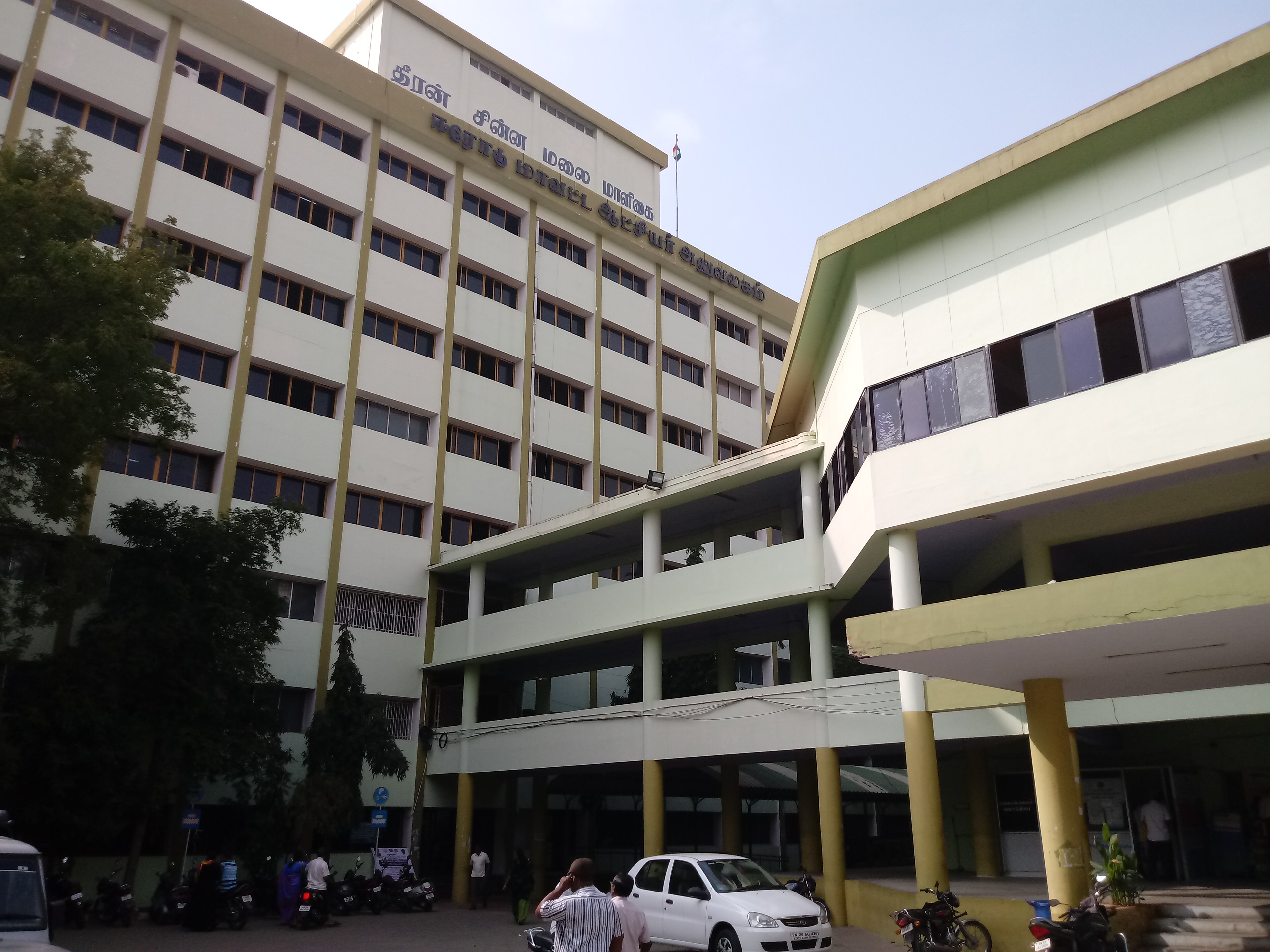
District Collectorate at Erode

The district is headquartered at Erode and is divided into two revenue divisions, Erode and Gobichettipalayam. It is further subdivided into 10 taluks for administrative purposes.

| Revenue division | Taluks |
|---|---|
| Erode | Erode; Kodumudi; Modakurichi; Perundurai |
| Gobichettipalayam | Anthiyur; Bhavani; Gobichettipalayam; Sathyamangalam; Nambiyur; Thalavadi |

The district has one municipal corporation (Erode), one selection grade municipality (Gobichettipalayam), one first grade municipality (Sathyamangalam), two second grade municipalities (Bhavani and Punjai Puliampatti). In January 2025, the Government of Tamil Nadu announced the formation of two new municipalities of Kavindapadi and Perundurai. There are 39 town panchayats in the district. (Note: Perundurai was upgraded into a municipality. The municipality Kavindapadi was formed by the merger of the town panchayats of P. Mettupalayam and Salangapalayam with the erstwhile panchayat of Kavindapadi.)

=== Law and order ===
The Tamil Nadu Police, operates under the Home ministry of the Government of Tamil Nadu and is responsible for maintaining law and order in the district. It is headed by Superintendent of Police and operates 37 police stations spread across five geographical sub-divisions: Erode Town, Erode Rural, Bhavani, Gobichettipalayam and Sathyamangalam. The judicial system with Madras High Court as the appellate authority, operates a district magistrate court at Erode with jurisdictional magistrate courts at Erode, Gobichettipalayam and Bhavani.

== Politics ==
| District | No. | Constituency | Name | Party | | Alliance | Remarks |
|---|---|---|---|---|---|---|---|
| Erode | 98 | Erode East | M. Vijay Balaji | | TVK | TVK+ | Cabinet Minister |
| Erode | 99 | Erode West | K. K. Anand Mohan | | TVK | TVK+ | |
| Erode | 100 | Modakkurichi | D. Shanmugan | | TVK | TVK+ | |
| Erode | 103 | Perundurai | S. Jayakumar | Supported TVK | | | |
| Erode | 103 | Perundurai | Vacant | | | | On 25 May 2026, resigned from office and officially joined TVK |
| Erode | 104 | Bhavani | K. C. Karuppannan | | AIADMK | AIADMK+ | Opposed TVK |
| Erode | 105 | Anthiyur | P. Haribaskar | | AIADMK | AIADMK+ | Supported TVK; Later declared support for EPS |
| Erode | 106 | Gobichettipalayam | K. A. Sengottaiyan | | TVK | TVK+ | Cabinet Minister |
| Erode | 107 | Bhavanisagar (SC) | V. P. Tamilselvi | | TVK | TVK+ | |

== Economy ==
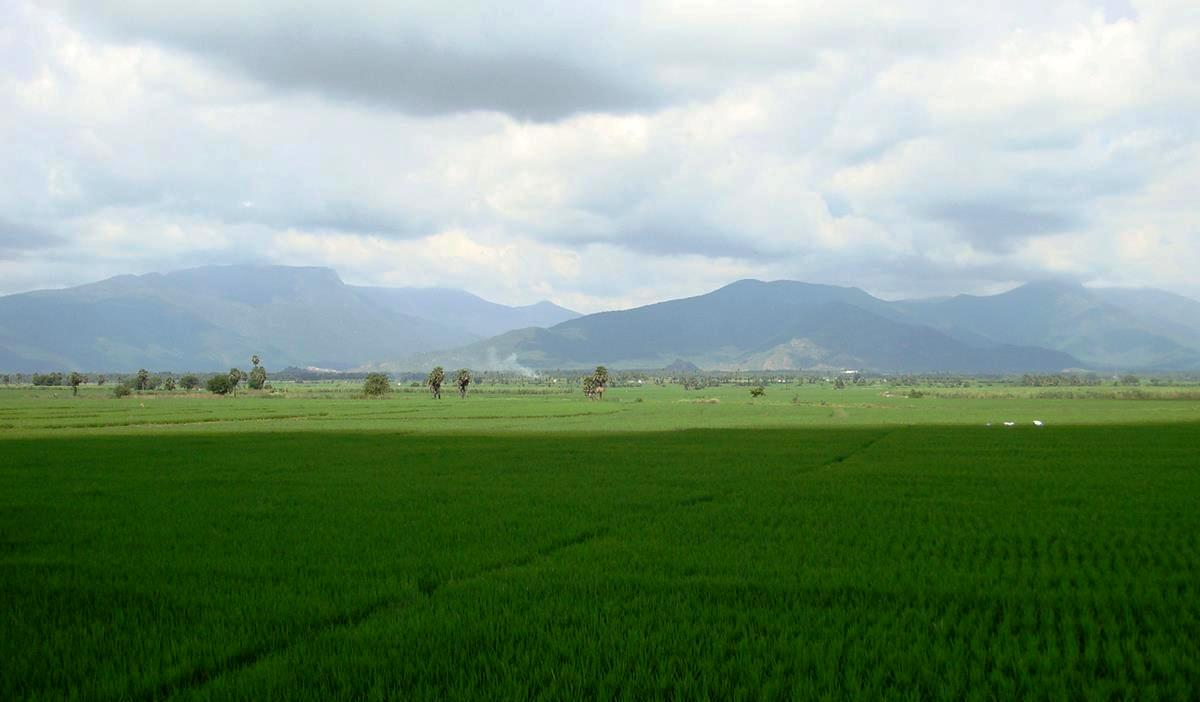
Agriculture is the major contributor to the economy

Agriculture is the major contributor to the economy of the district. Paddy, plantain, silk, cotton, turmeric, coconut and sugarcane are the major agricultural crops. The district is the top turmeric producer in Tamil Nadu, making up 43% of statewide production. Erode is an important market centre for turmeric, being known as "Turmeric City" and Erode Turmeric is a recognized Geographical Indication. The district is also the leading producer of plantain, coconuts and white silk in Tamil Nadu. Gobichettipalayam is a major center for copra and plantain trading and is one of the leading producers of silk cocoon in the country, with one of the country's first automated silk reeling units located here. Other major horticultural crops include fruits, vegetables, tapioca and yam, spices, betel vine and cocoa and flowers like rose, jasmine and marigold.

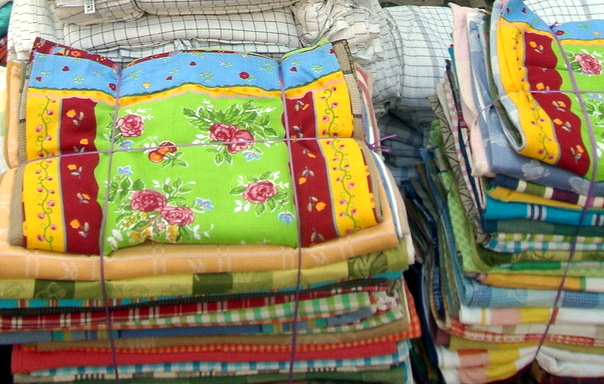
Fabrics made in Erode are popular

The district is one of the most industrialized districts in the state with more than 23,000 small scale industries and 1,200 factories. Textiles is the other major industry in the district. The district is known for its handloom textile products and ready-made garments. In 2005, Bhavani Jamakkalam was registered as a Geographical Indication. There are nearly 49,000 handloom and 39,000 powerlooms operating in the district with the sector employing more than 45,000 people. There are about 13 co-operative societies involved in the production and marketing of textiles.

Other major industries include oil mills, rice mills, food processing, leather products, paper products, vehicle parts, electrical equipment and metallic products. There are more than 450 oil mills involved in edible oil production. The district is also a leading producer of milk and other dairy products.

== Transport ==
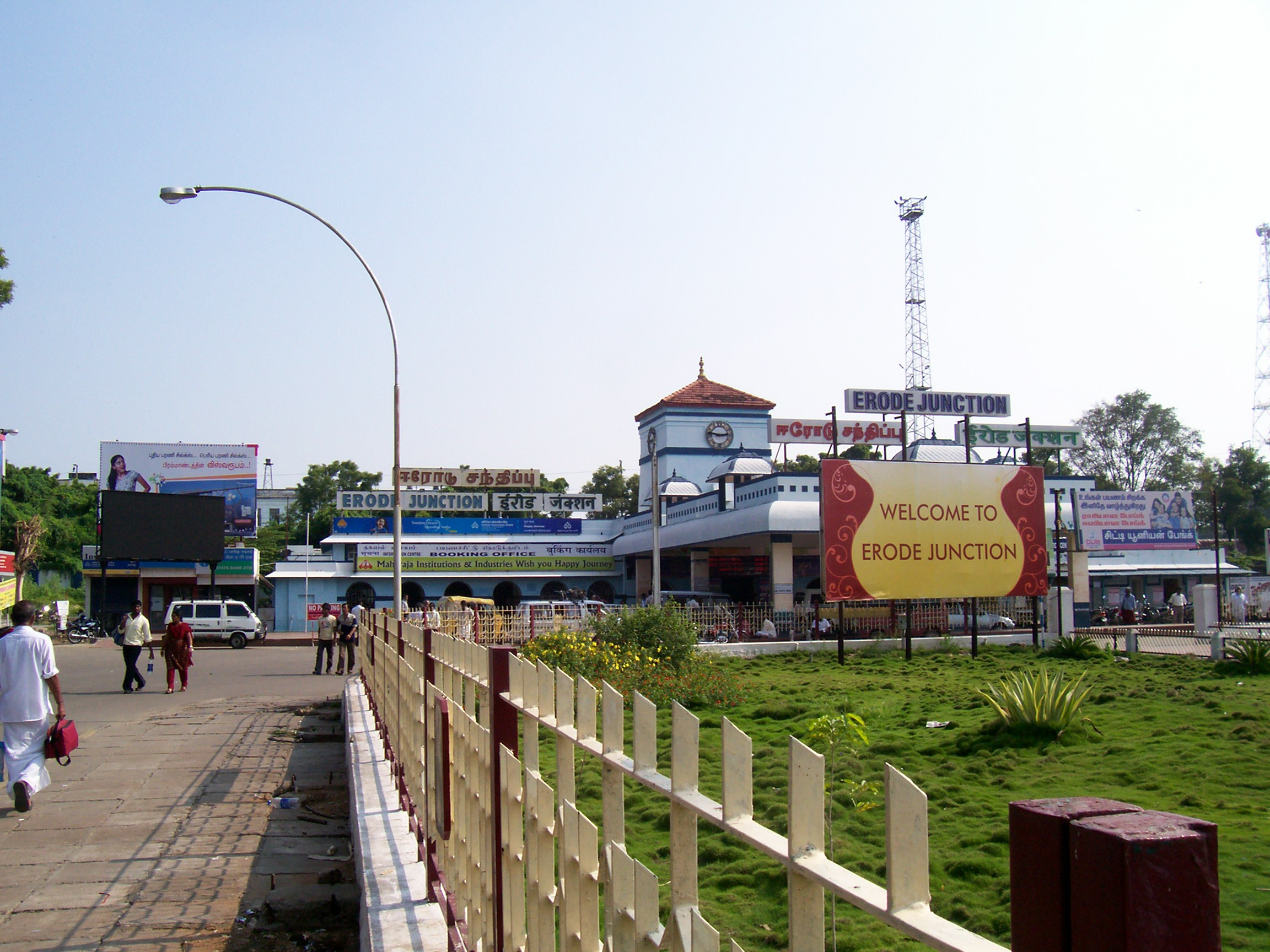
Erode Junction railway station

The transportation system in the district is well-developed with the district well-connected by a wide road network and a limited rail network. The district has one major railway station, Erode Junction. It is one of the major stations in the state and handles nearly 165 trains. It has a diesel locomotive shed and an electric loco shed attached to it.

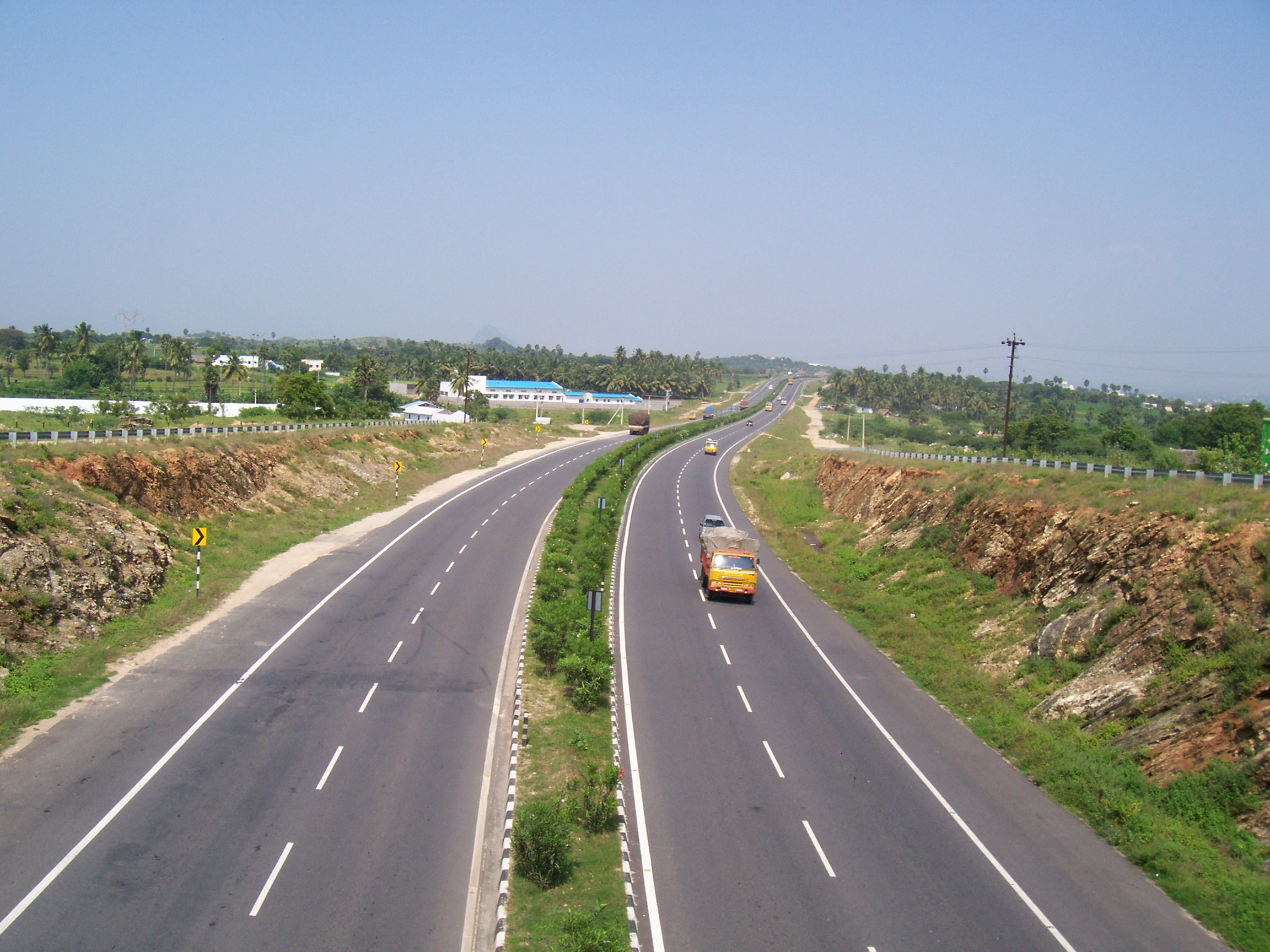
NH 544 near Chithode

The Highways Department of the state was established in April 1946 and is responsible for construction and maintenance of national highways, state highways, major district roads and other roads in the state. It operates through two divisions at Erode and Gobichettipalayam. The major arterial roads include NH-544, NH-948, NH-544H and NH 381A. State Highways include SH-15, SH-15A, SH-81, SH-79, SH-82, SH-84 and SH-96.

The district has four Regional Transport Office sub-divisions, namely Erode East (TN 33), Gobichettipalayam (TN 36), Perundurai (TN 56) and Erode West (TN 86). Gobichettipalayam RTO has two sub-offices, namely Bhavani (TN 36W) and Sathyamangalam (TN 36Z). The Coimbatore division of Tamil Nadu State Transport Corporation (TNSTC) operates inter and intra-city routes. The State Express Transport Corporation (SETC) operates express bus services from Erode and Gobichettipalayam to major cities across the state and neighbouring states. Erode Central Bus Terminus, which serves as a major hub, is one of the largest in the state. Due to its proximity to the states of Karnataka and Kerala, Karnataka State Road Transport Corporation and Kerala State Road Transport Corporation buses also operate in the district.

The nearest major airport is the Coimbatore International Airport located in the nearby Coimbatore district, which has regular flights from/to major domestic destinations and international destinations like Sharjah, Colombo and Singapore.

== Infrastructure ==
Fire services are handled by the Tamil Nadu Fire and Rescue Services which operates 11 operating fire stations. The district is served by extensive postal and telephone networks. Postal service is handled by India Post, which operates more than 320 post offices in the district. The district is divided into two postal divisions, namely Erode and Gobichettipalayam with three head post offices at Erode, Bhavani and Gobichettipalayam. The district is serviced by almost all leading mobile phone operators including Bharti Airtel, BSNL, Vodafone Idea and Reliance Jio offering 4G and 5G mobile services. Wireline and broadband services are offered by major operators and other smaller local operators. There are about 1354 beds in government hospitals across the district with major hospitals located at Erode, Perundurai and Gobichettipalayam, apart from other private hospitals.

== Education ==
Erode district is divided into two educational districts, Gobichettipalayam and Erode. There are 1731 schools in the district including 113 nursery schools, 125 government aided schools and 216 self-financing schools. The Chikkaiah Naicker College was established in 1954 and the Gobi Arts and Science College was founded in 1968. The Institute of Road and Transport Technology is an automobile research institute established by the Tamil Nadu State Transport Corporation in 1984. The Erode Medical College at Perundurai was established in 1992.

== Places of interest ==
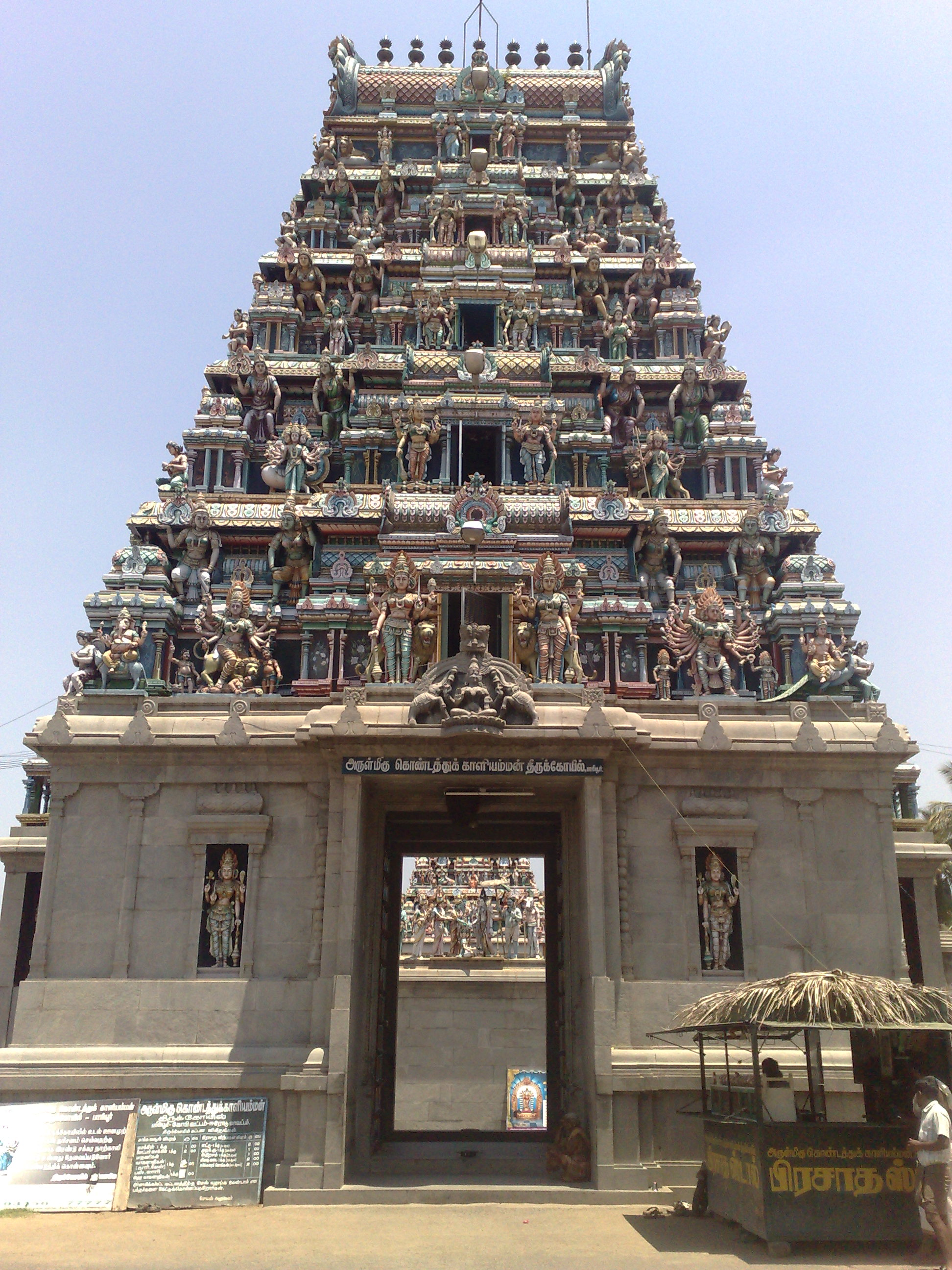
Pariyur Kondathu Kaliamman Temple

- Bannari Amman Temple
- Bhavanisagar Dam
- Chennimalai Murugan temple
- Government Museum, Erode
- Kodiveri Dam
- Kodumudi Magudeshwarar Temple
- Kunderipallam Dam
- Pachaimalai Subramanya Swamy Temple
- Pariyur Kondathu Kaliamman Temple
- Perumpallam Dam
- Sangameswarar Temple
- Sathyamangalam Wildlife Sanctuary
- Thindal Murugan Temple
- Vellode Birds Sanctuary
- Vijayamangalam Jain temple

== See also ==
- List of districts of Tamil Nadu
