= Moongilpalayam =

Village in India

Coordinates: 11.631556°N 77.594175°E

Moongilpalayam is a village in Anthiyur taluk, Erode district of Tamil Nadu, India. It is about 40 km from Erode and 25 km from Bhavani travelling north-east on highway 175. The village of Ennamangalam is about 1 km north. Moongilpalayam has a population of over 200 families (1,423 in 1991 census). Moongilpalayam is surrounded by three lakes; Ennamangalam Lake to the north, Getti Samuthiram Lake to the south, and Raasangulam Yeri to the south-east. One of the biggest dams in India, the Mettur Dam is about 20 km distance and the Varattu Pallam Dam is 3 km distance.
