= Attayampalayam =

Village in India

- village
- Country: India
- State: Tamil Nadu
- District: Erode

Population
  - Total: 500
  - Density: 500/km^{2} (1,300/sq mi)

Languages
  - Official: Tamil
- Time zone: UTC+5:30 (IST)
- PIN: 638102
- Telephone code: 0424
- Coastline: 0 kilometres (0 mi)
- Nearest city: Erode
- Lok Sabha constituency: Erode
- Climate: moderate (Köppen)

Attayampalayam is a village in Erode district of Tamil Nadu, India.

"Texvalley", an industrial area for textile related business development, is located near to this place.

== Neighborhoods ==
- Nasiyanur
- Perundurai
- Chithode
- Lakshmi Nagar
- Bhavani
- Komarapalayam
- Erode
- Thiruvaachi
- Moolakkarai

== Location ==
It is located along National Highway 47 between (~1.5 km north of) Nasiyanur and (~4 km south of) Chithode.

== Administration ==
Attayampalayam is a part of Nasiyanur Town Panchayat, Erode West MLA constituency, and Erode MP constituency.

== Demography ==
Major communities living in this village are Kongu Vellalar, Navithar, Nadar, Kuyavar and Adi Dravida.

== Occupation ==
Majority of the population are engaged in agriculture, real-estate and related works. Also some people are engaged in handloom and some get deployed in corporate sectors over world. People work in nearby towns, Erode and Perundurai. It is a place surrounded by turmeric and sugarcane fields.
