= Thalapalayam =

Panchayat town in India

Coordinates: 11°33′31″N 77°39′22″E

Thalapalayam is a panchayat town in Erode district in the Indian state of Tamil Nadu.

Nearby cities are Bhavani ப‌வானி, Erode, and Kavundhapadi.

== Education ==
Panchayat Union Primary School, Thalapayam was established in year 1954. It provides primary level education and is being managed by local body. Medium of instruction is Tamil language and school is co-educational. Currently the school is being guided by principal/head teacher K. Kannammal.
