= Periyavadamalaipalayam =

Village in India

Periyavadamalaipalayam is a village under the jurisdiction of Jambai Panchayat, Tamil Nadu, India. The village has an approximate population of 2000 people.

Agriculture, including ground nut, sugar cane, turmeric and corn cultivation, is the main occupation of the villagers, although handloom products are also manufactured there. Villagers have taken the initiative to plant thousands of saplings to make it greener.

The village has many temples and a church. There is a primary school in the village.
