= Varattupallam Dam =

Dam in Tamil Nadu, India

Coordinates: 11°40′32″N 77°33′29″E

- Country: India
- Location: Erode, Tamil Nadu
- Purpose: Water supply, irrigation
- Status: Operational

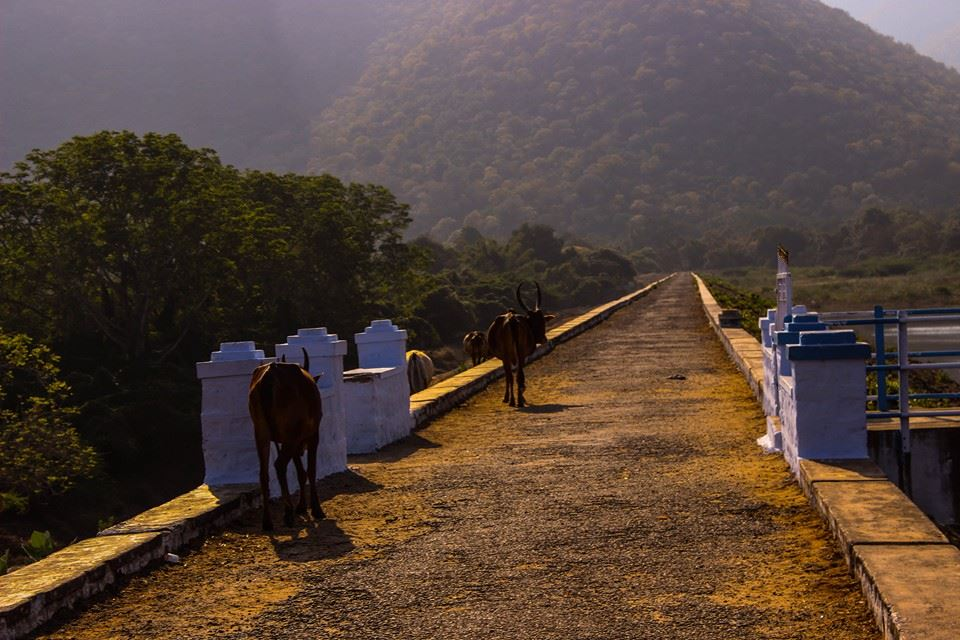
Varattupallam Dam

Varattupallam Dam is an artificial dam constructed in hills 12 km (7.5 mi) from Anthiyur in the Erode District. This dam irrigates nearby areas. A mountain road from Anthiyur leads to Kollegal. Storage capacity of this reservoir is 1.39 TMC. This is the one of place who Hits 1200 MM rain in erode district. with canals and tanks that have ayacut areas totalling about 5,500 acres water holding capacity

== Geography and wildlife ==
Varattupallam Dam is located next to the forest area, hence nearby habitations of wild animals like deer, bison, leopard, monkeys, porcupine, and birds. In the afternoon and evening, herds of elephants come to the dam to drink water.

Around 2021, the state government had announced an auction process for fishing rights in the Varattupallam area, and a fishermen's cooperative society secured a court order that allowed the fishing operations to continue. In August 2025, the Forest Department issued oral instructions prohibiting fishing and closed the dam's front gate, and Anthiyur fishermen have petitioned the District Collector demanding to restore their fishing rights.

== Animal sanctuary ==
Varattupallam Dam has become a popular tourist destination due to its natural landmarks and the recreational opportunities it offers. When Tamil Nadu Legislative Assembly presented the 2023-24 budget, it was announced that a new wildlife sanctuary 'Thanthai Periyar Animal Sanctuary' would be established near Varattupallam Dam in the next two years, making it the 18th animal sanctuary in Tamil Nadu.
