= Sri Gurunatha Swamy temple =

Hindu temple in Anthiyur, Tamil Nadu

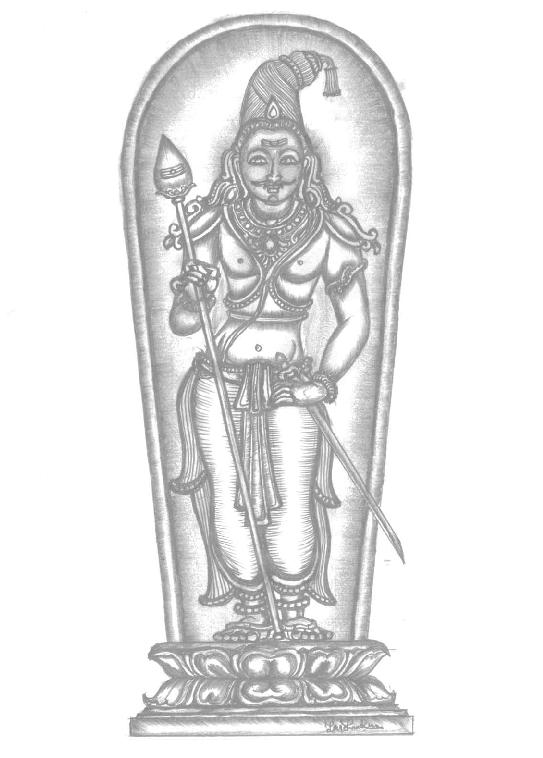
- Sri Gurunatha Swamy

Religion
- Affiliation: Hinduism
- District: Erode
- Deity: Murugan; Shiva; Vishnu; Kamakshi

Location
- Location: Anthiyur
- State: Tamil Nadu
- Country: India
- Interactive map of Sri Gurunatha Swamy temple
- Coordinates: 11°35′45″N 77°35′16″E

Sri Gurunatha Swamy temple is a Hindu temple located in Pudupalayam, Anthiyur in Erode district, Tamil Nadu.

== Mythology ==
About 600 years ago, people of the Vanniyar community worshipped three sacred stones as their clan deity near Pichavaram, Chidambaram.Due to threats from the Mughal ruler, the people threw the stones in the nearby river, and escaped from the village. These stones were later found in Pudupalayam near Anthiyur, and a temple was later built with the help of the Pandyas. The three stones represent different deities, identified with Kamakshi, Vishnu, and Shiva and Murugan combined as Gurunathaswami.

== Festival ==
The annual temple festival is held during the Tamil calendar month of Aadi. The "Kulukkai box", a large box located at the centre of the temple's main prakara is opened only during the festival. The box is used to store various puja materials, and are inhabited by snakes, and the locals worship it to protect their properties from harmful creatures. A cattle fair is held during the festival which draws hundreds of horses and other domesticated animals.
