= Bhavani Sangameswarar Temple =

Hindu temple in Tamil Nadu, India

Coordinates: 11°26′5.6″N 77°40′58.1″E

Sangameswarar Temple
- Thirunana
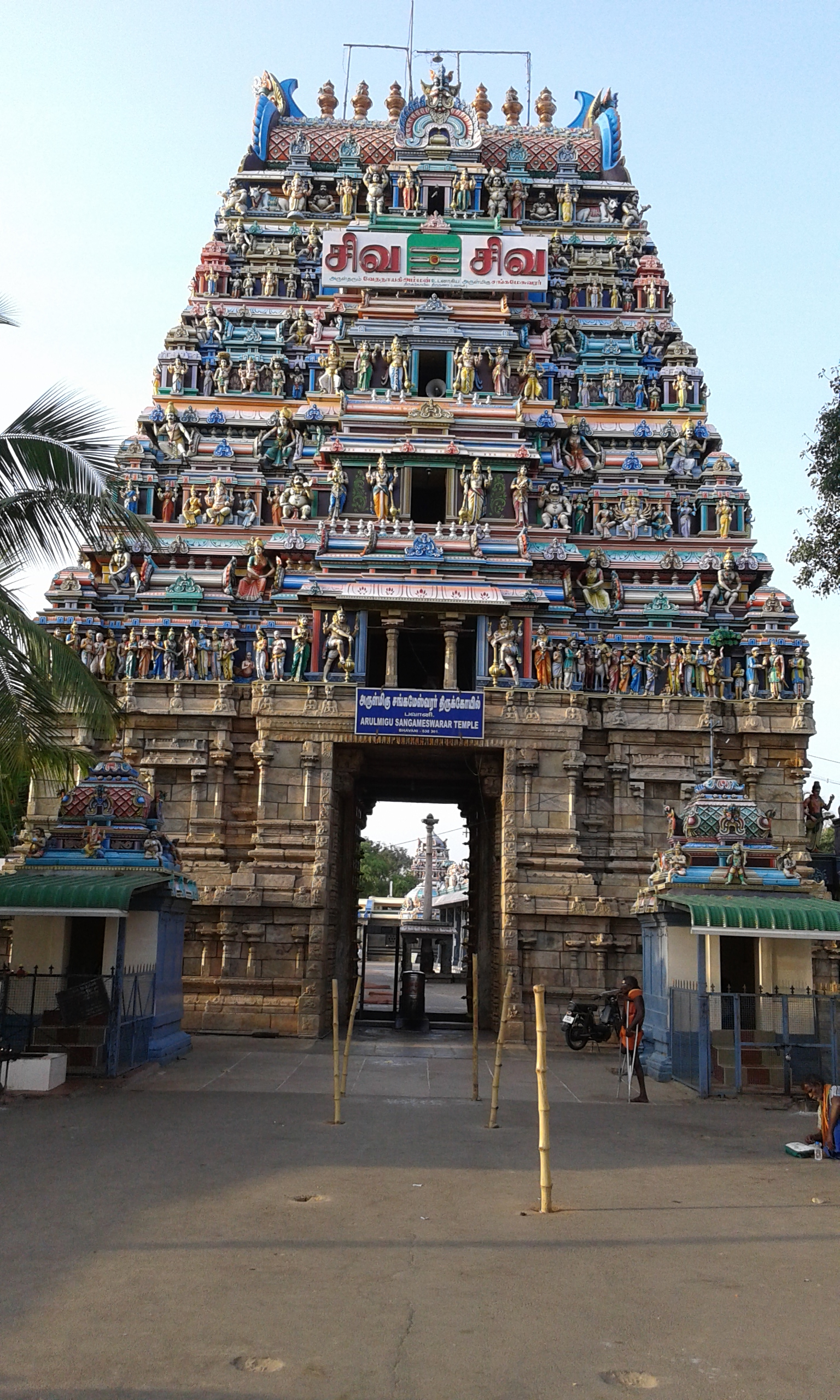

Religion
- Affiliation: Hinduism
- District: Erode
- Deity: Shiva, Vishnu

Location
- Location: Kooduthurai, Bhavani, Erode
- State: Tamil Nadu
- Country: India
- Interactive map of Sangameswarar Temple

Architecture
- Type: South Indian, Temple

Sangameswarar temple (also called Thirunana and Thirukooduthurai) is a temple in Bhavani, in the Erode district, of the Indian state of Tamil Nadu. It is a Hindu temple dedicated to Lord Shiva. It is 15 km from Erode, 30 km from Gobichettipalayam, 56 km from Salem and 106 km from Coimbatore.

The temple was built at the confluence of rivers Kaveri, Bhavani and the mystic Amutha (Agaya Gangai). The temple was praised in old Tamil literature as Thirunana. The place is also known as Dakshina Triveni Sangamam and Kooduthurai indicating the confluence of three rivers. Devotees perform last rites for ancestors on the riverbank and offer prayers at the Sangameshwarar temple.

== Legend ==
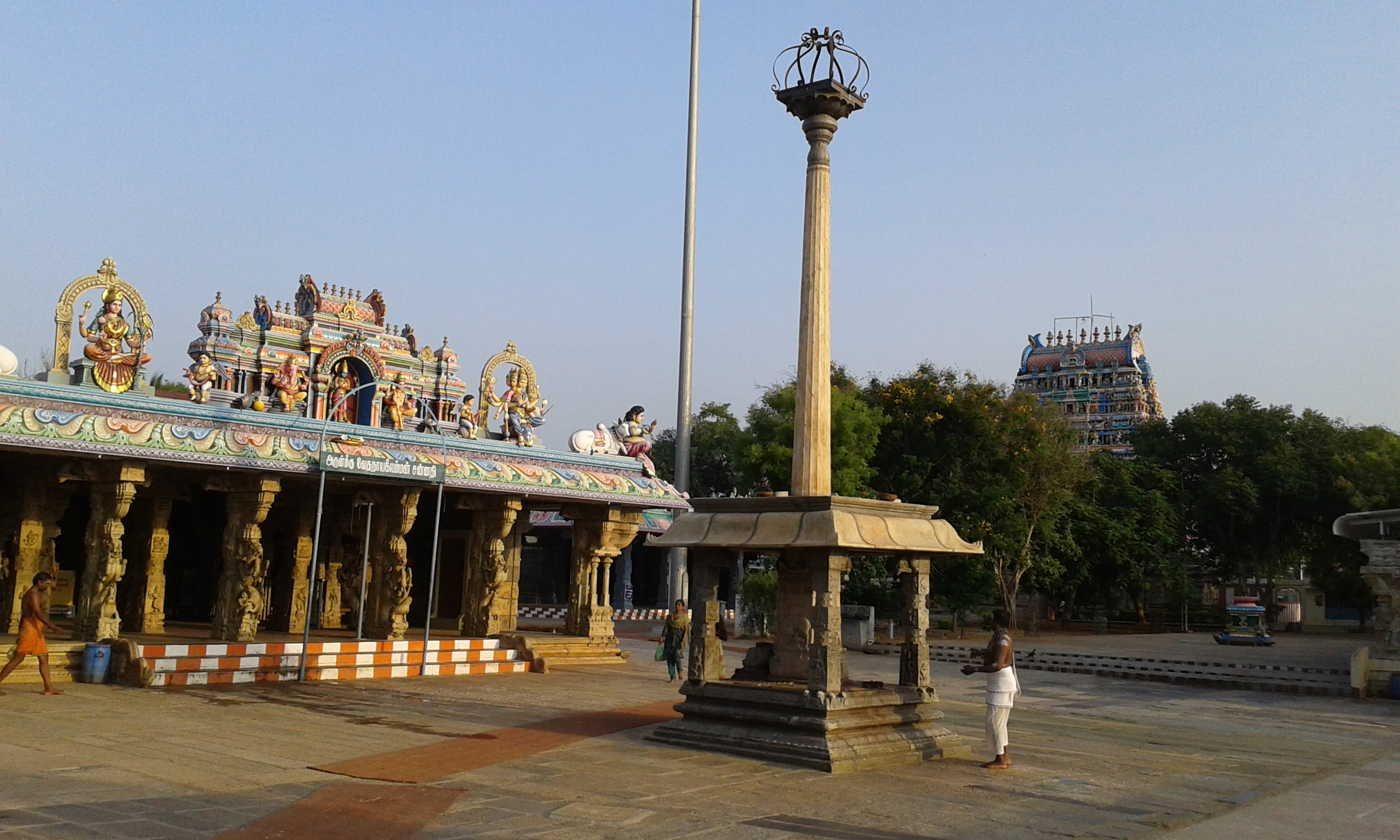
Image of the shrines

Kubera, son of Vishrava was gifted an aircraft to visit Shiva temples across the country in recognition of his devotion to Lord Shiva. While he was flying near the river Cauvery Kubera was surprised to see a deer, tiger, cow, elephant, snake, and rat drinking water near an Ilandhai tree on the river bank without enmity, to answer his wonder Kubera heard a voice from the sky saying it was a place where vedas visited, inhabited by Gandharvas and advised him to worship the shiva lingam under the iilanadhi tree. The temples Ilandhai tree gives fruit on all season and was used for everyday puja even today. The cow behind the Vishnu statue remains the harmony between Saivism and Vaishnavism. It was said that every inch under the temple has one shiva lingam. The presiding deity is believed to have been worshipped by Kubera and sages Vishvamitra and Parasara.

During the period of Chera Chola and Pandya, there was a cave connection between the Chidambaram and Sangameshwarar temples and puja's are performed at same time in both temples.

In the year 1804, William Karo, a British Collector of Coimbatore district, visited Bhavani, camping in the Travellers' Bungalow. One night, a small girl woke him up and got him out of the Bungalow when he was asleep. Once they were out, the Bungalow collapsed. Shocked by this incident, the Collector turned to thank the girl but to find, she wasn't there. The next day, the priest on duty informed him that it was Bhavani Vedanaayaki Amman, who saved his life. He bore three holes in the temple wall opposite Vedanaayaki Amman shrine and torched these holes to pray the goddess. He offered a gold plate to the goddess with his signature dated 11/01/1804. The holes and the gold plate are present even now and are taken care of with caution.

== History ==
The temple is maintained and administered by the Hindu Religious and Charitable Endowments Department of the Government of Tamil Nadu.

== Architecture ==
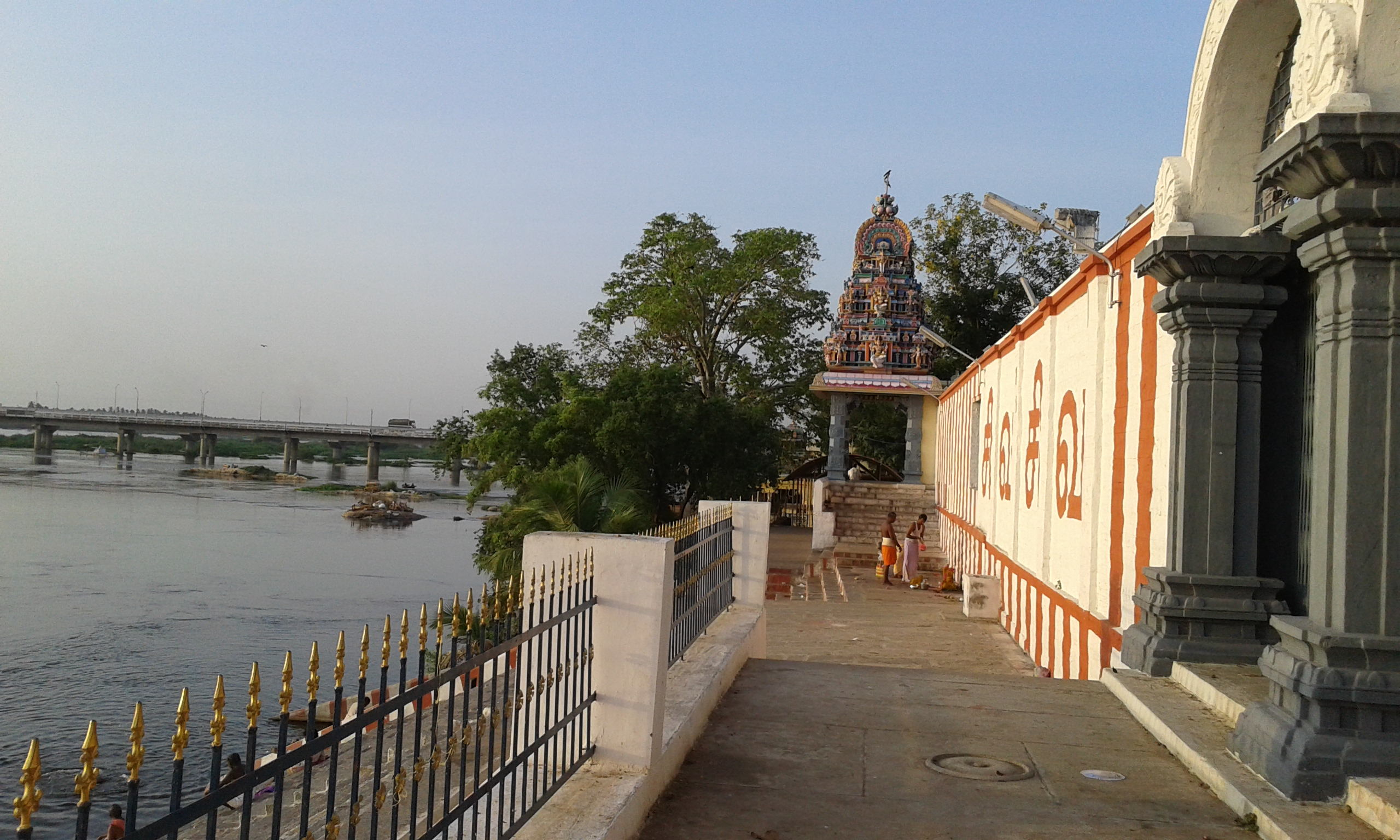
Ghat where sacrifices are performed

The temple is constructed on a 4-acre (16,000 m^{2}) plot. The main RajaGopuram with five tiers is located on the north side of the temple. The presiding deity is Shiva known as Sangameswarar along with his consort Pannaar Mozhiyaal or Vedanayagi. A shrine dedicated to Kartikeya is situated between the shrines of Shiva and Parvati. There is also separate shrine inside the temple for Vishnu and his consort Soundaravalli Thaayar. The stala vriksham is an ilandai (Zizyphus mauritiana) tree. The annual Brahmotsavam is celebrated in the Tamil month of Chitrai.

Rock status of this temple represents the beauty of stone carving and the culture of the people. When water or milk poured on the two identical stone statues in front of ambal sannidhi- Hindu goddess, one smiles at you, while the other sheds tears at you. The temple got a precious Ambal statue, a Hindu goddess donated by a district collector during British period for saving his life. Of all the seven holy Shiva centers of the Kongu Region, Bhavani is known as Thirunana in script. The holy waters of Sangameswarar temple is known as Cauvery theertham, Surya theertham and Gayatri theertham.

The Amirthalingeswarar in the temple is placed on a seat called Avudayar according to Saiva principles. It is a mobile one that can be removed and placed on the seat again. Men and women seeking boons for children take the Sivalinga, perform puja and walk around it for three times and place it back on the Avudayar. The Amirthalinga is in the southern entrance of the temple.

== Literary mention ==
It is one of the shrines of the 275 Paadal Petra Sthalams. The Nayanmars Thevaram pathigam is composed by Sambandar. He had composed 10 poems in this temple in the praise of the lord which comes under 2nd Thirumurai. Saint Arunagirinathar who visited Thirunanaa, has composed many songs (Thirupugazh) on Lord Subramanya.

== Gallery ==
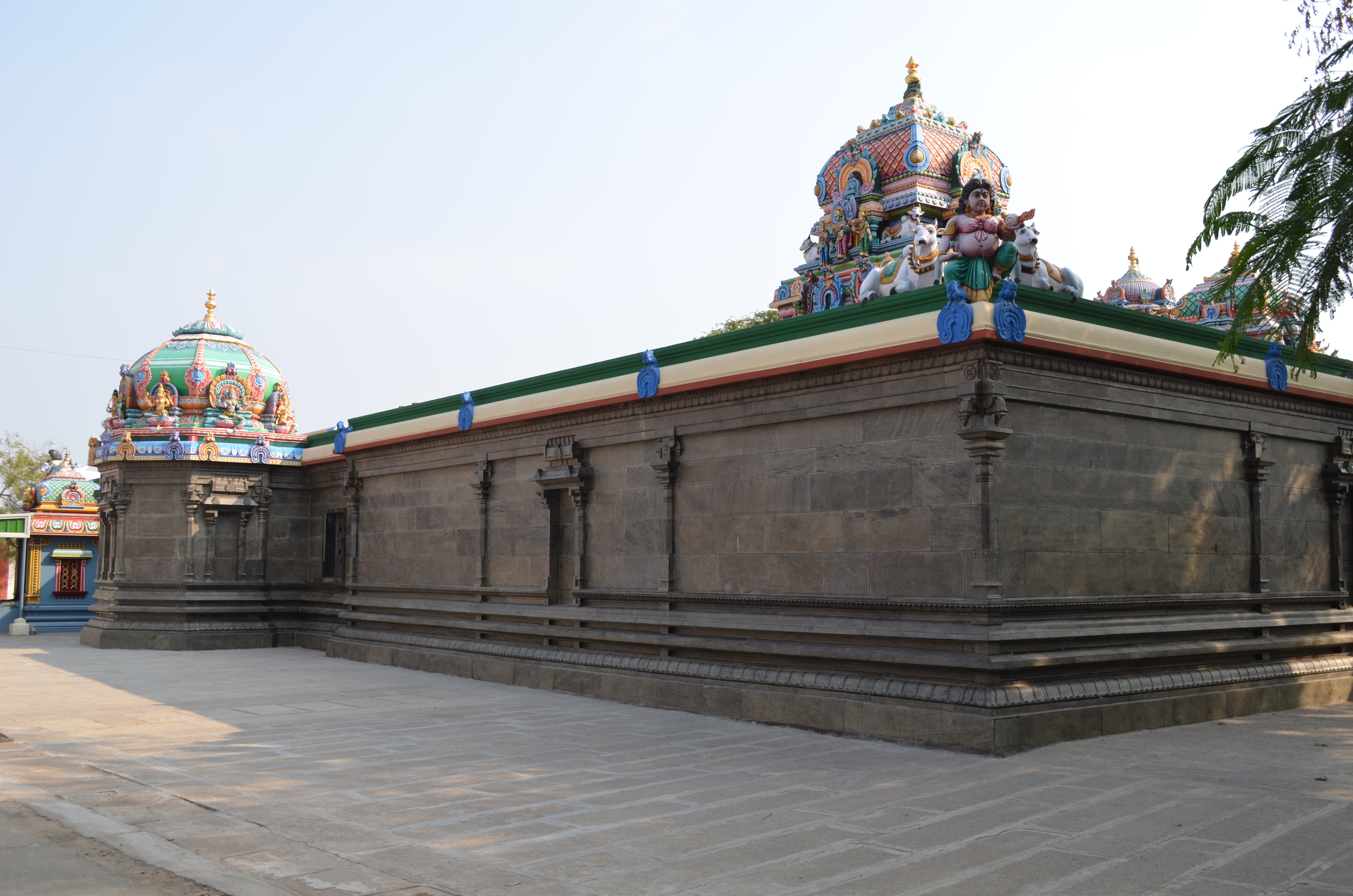
Prakara

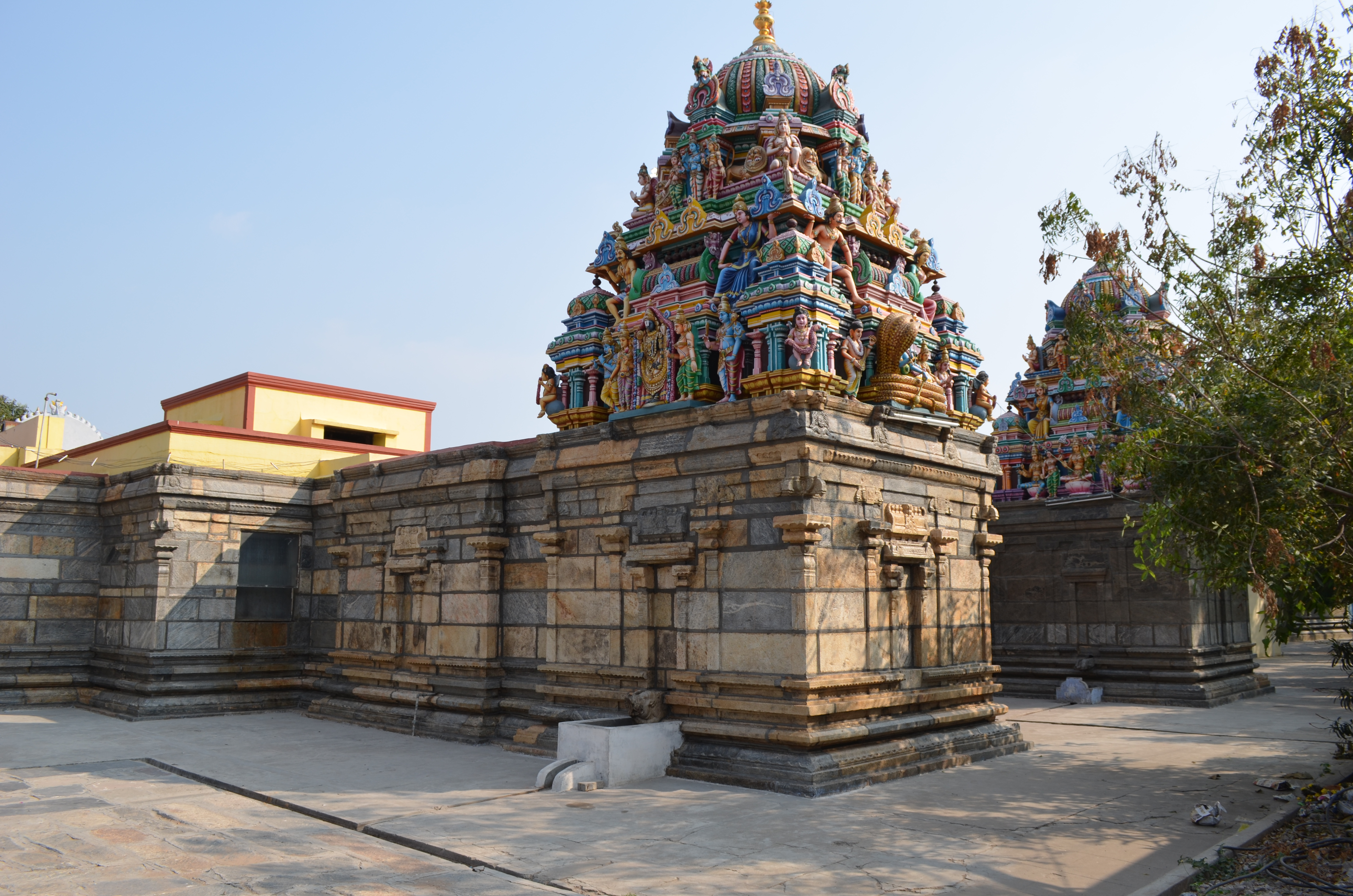
Vimana

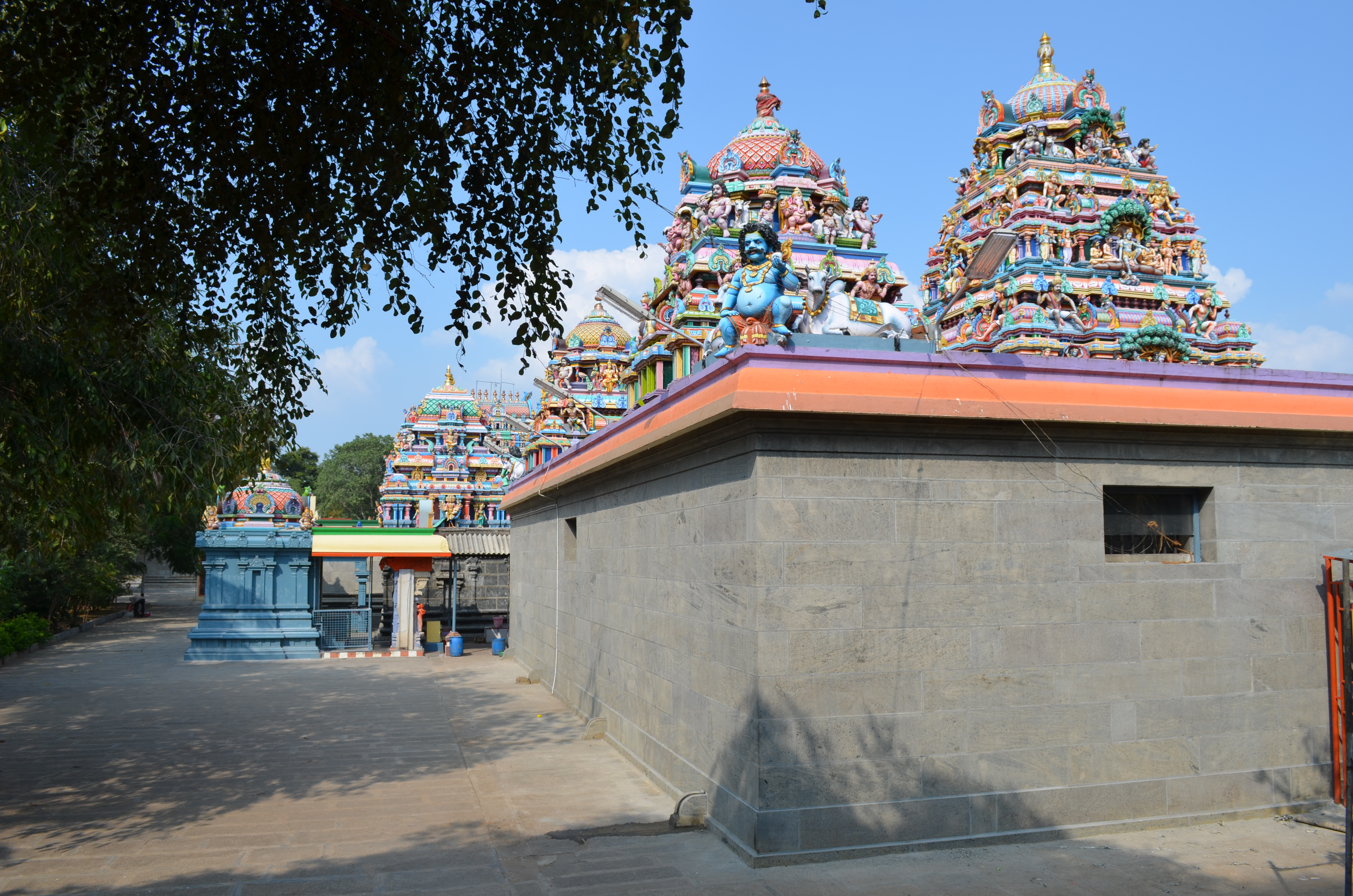
Vimanas

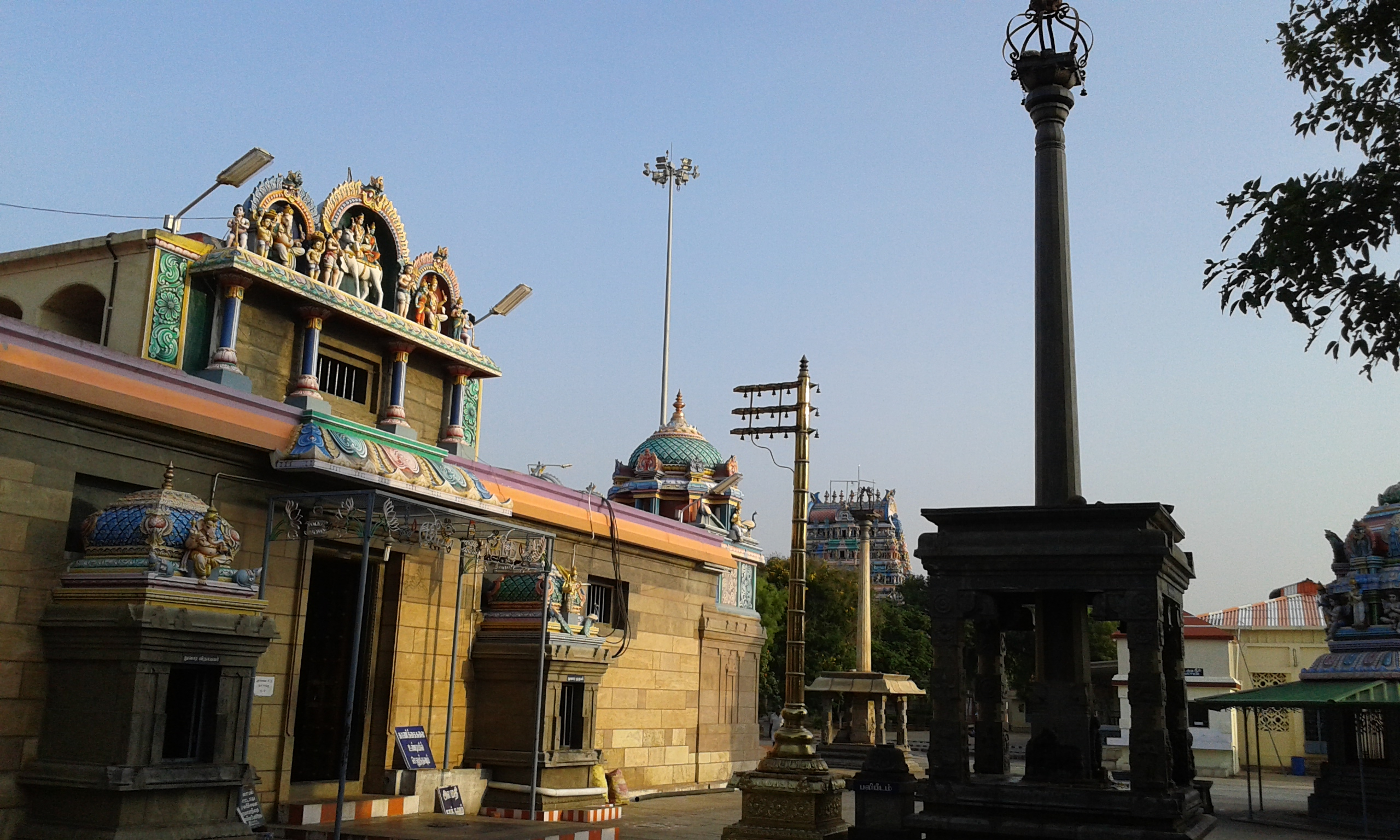
Entrance to Sangameswarar shrine

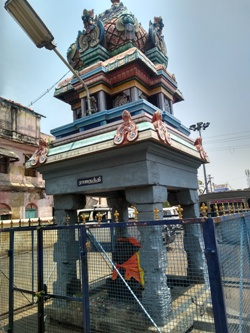
Nandhi mandapa in front of Rajagopura

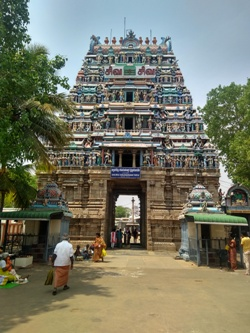
Rajagopura

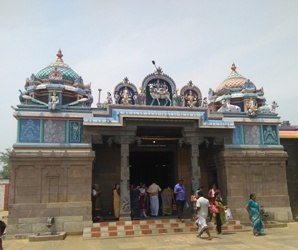
Sangameswarar shrine

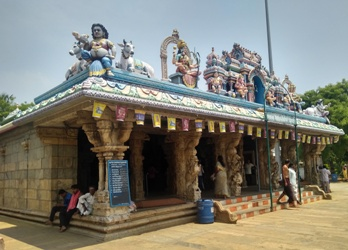
Vedayanaki Amman shrine

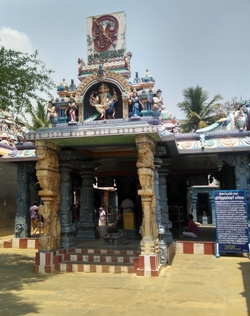
Murugan shrine

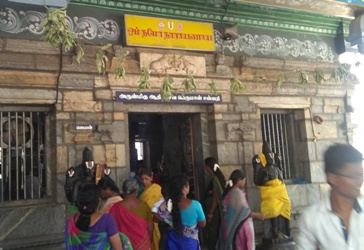
Adhi Kesava Perumal shrine

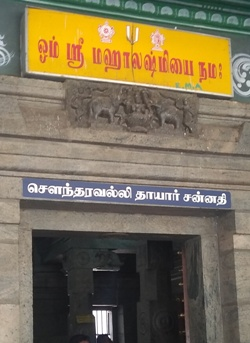
Soundaravalli Thayar shrine

== Ambal sannadhi with beautiful sculptures ==
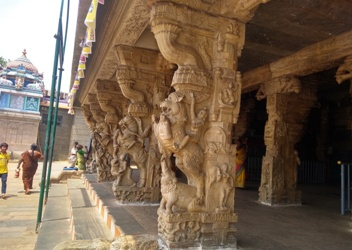

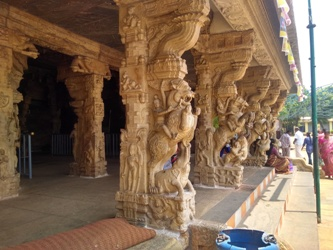

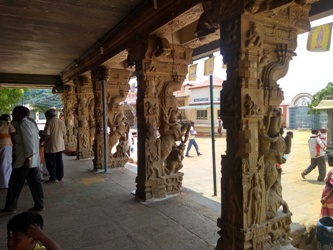

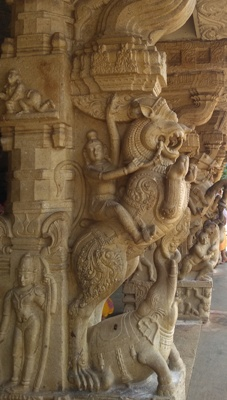

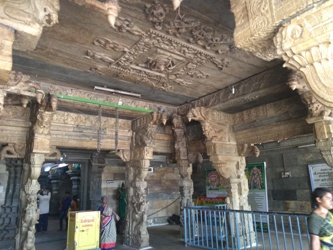

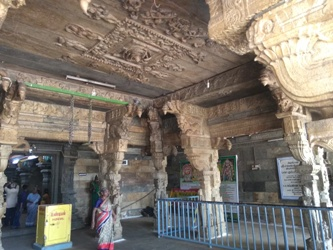

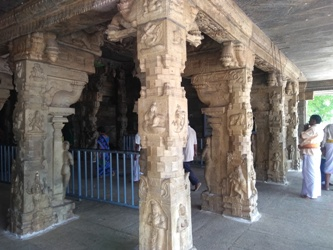
