= Bhavani Jamakkalam =

Type of blankets and carpets

- Geographical indication
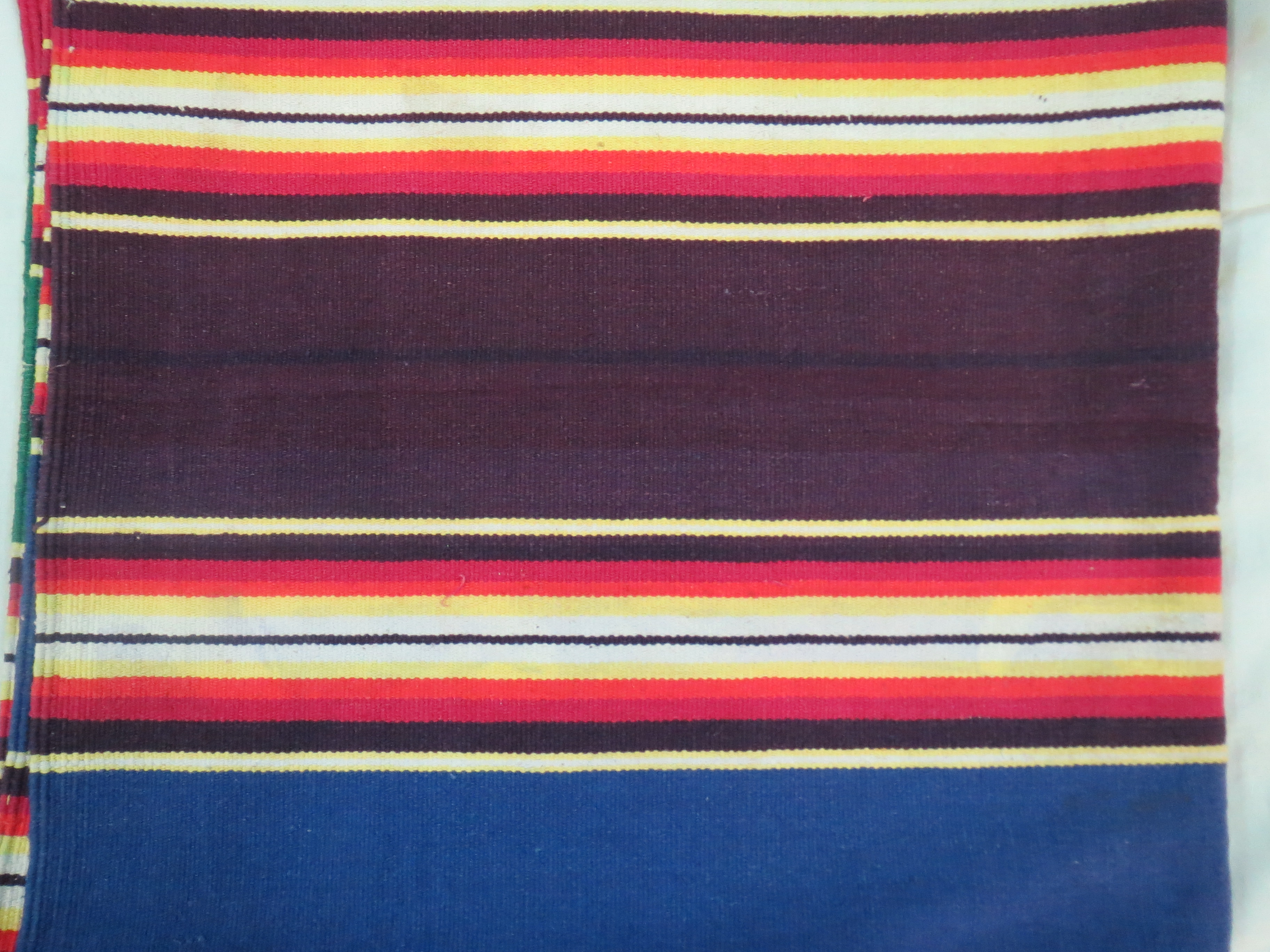
- Bhavani Jamakkalam
- Description: Blankets and carpets manufactured in Bhavani
- Type: Handicraft
- Area: Bhavani, Tamil Nadu
- Country: India
- Registered: 2005–06
- Material: Cotton

Bhavani Jamakkalam refers to blankets and carpets manufactured in Bhavani in Erode district, Tamil Nadu. It was recognized as a geographical indication by the Government of India in 2005–06.

== History ==
In the late nineteenth century, competition from British made textiles led Indian weavers to invent new types of garments. In Bhavani, a community of weavers called Jangamars wove a type of blanket using colored coarse threads called jamakkalam. The popularity of the product led to the production of jamakkalams by other weavers replacing the production of traditional sarees and other cloths.

== Types ==
Two types of jamakkalams are produced in Bhavani. The first type is made from coarser cotton threads capable of producing carpets with colored bands. As the thread was coarser, designs could not be woven onto this type of carpet. Hence, a second, softer variety of jamakkalams were introduced that were made of artificial silk threads enabling weavers to weave different kinds of border designs. Jamakkalams are also used to make fashion products such as backpacks.

== Community ==
Traditionally, jamakkalams were woven by independent weavers in their houses. Later this moved to a system where they were woven by weavers on hand-looms supervised by master weavers. The master weavers lease hand-looms and contract weavers. The hand-looms are owned by trade merchants who procure raw materials such as thread from neighboring cities of Coimbatore, Salem and Karur. About 1500 workers are involved in the production of jamakkalams, with women forming two-thirds of the work force.

== Weaving loom ==
A pit loom is used to weave jamakkalams. The looms are made of wood with the threads stretched horizontally from end to end. The weaver sits in a pit dug in the ground, on level with the weaving surface. The weaver operates two pedals with his legs while enabling the hands to move the shuttle across to produce the weaving pattern.

== Exports ==
The jamakkalams manufactured in Bhavani are exported to various countries such as Sweden, Germany, Italy, U.K., U.S. and Singapore. In 1993, Swedish major IKEA started procuring jamakkalams from Bhavani to be sold across its stores.

== Competition ==
Since the 2000s, the hand-woven jamakkalams from Bhavani have faced competition from power-loom products. The Government of Tamil Nadu offers subsidy to weavers and has enacted laws to outlaw the use of power-looms. The government also sells the blankets through government run Co-optex stores. Competition from blankets produced in Solapur, Maharashtra and cheap imports from neighbors China, Bangladesh and Sri Lanka has resulted in a drop in demand for Bhavani jamakkalams.

== Geographical Indication ==
In 2005, the Government of Tamil Nadu applied for a geographical indication for Bhavani jamakkalams. The Government of India recognized it as a geographical indication officially since 2005–06.

== Bibliography ==
- Geert de Neve (2005). The Everyday Politics of Labour: Working Lives in India's Informal Economy. Berghahn Books. ISBN 9788187358183.
- Jonathan P. Parry; Jan Breman; Karin Kapadia (2000). The worlds of Indian industrial labour. Sage Publications. ISBN 9780761993957.
- Jackie Assayag; Chris Fuller (2005). Globalizing India: Perspectives from Below. Anthem Press. ISBN 9780857287243.
