= Anthiyur =

- Panchayat Town
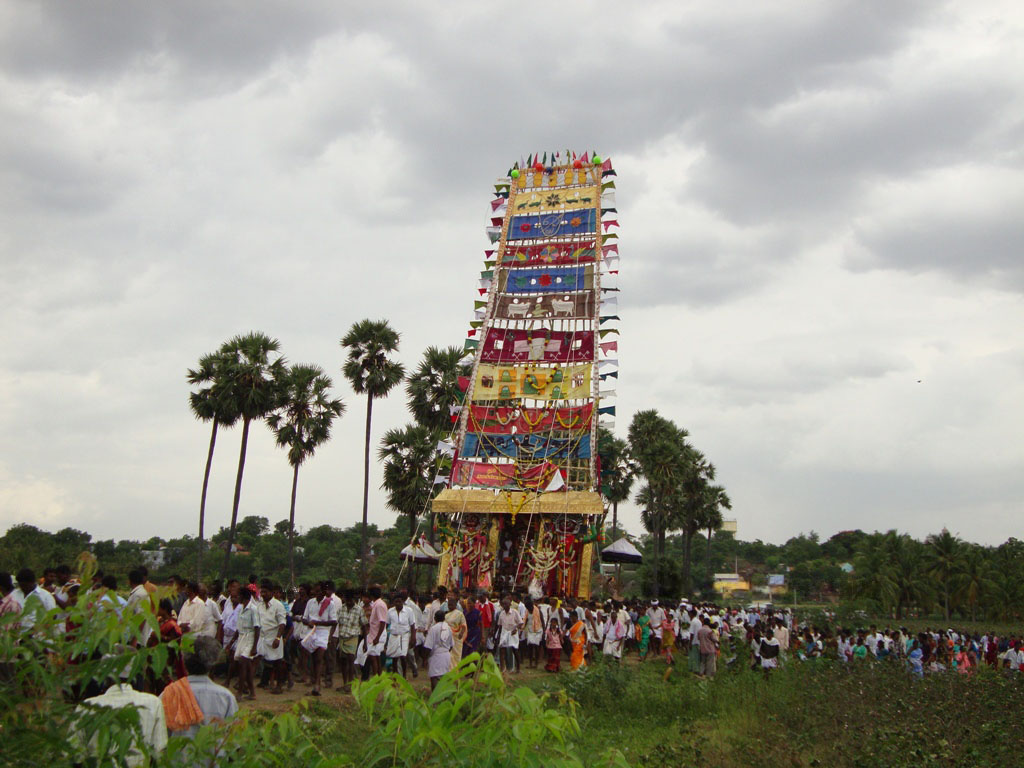

- Anthiyur, Tamil Nadu
- Coordinates: 11.577100°N 77.587700°E
- Country: India
- State: Tamil Nadu
- Region: Kongu nadu
- District: Erode
- Metropolitan: Coimbatore

Area
  - Total: 3.24 km^{2} (1.25 sq mi)
- Elevation: 247 m (810 ft)

Population (2001)
  - Total: 23,697
  - Density: 3,508/km^{2} (9,090/sq mi)

Languages
  - Official: Tamil
- Time zone: UTC+5:30 (IST)
- PIN: 638501,638314
- Telephone code: 04256
- Vehicle registration: TN-36
- Lok Sabha constituency: Tirupur
- State Assembly constituency: Anthiyur

Anthiyur is a taluk (Anthiyur taluk) and panchayat town in the Erode district in the state of Tamil Nadu, India.

== Geography ==
Anthiyur is located at 11.577100°N 77.587700°E. It has an average elevation of 247 m (810 ft). It is located at about 18 km from Bhavani, 30 km from Erode, 65 km from Tiruppur and 93.7 km from Coimbatore.

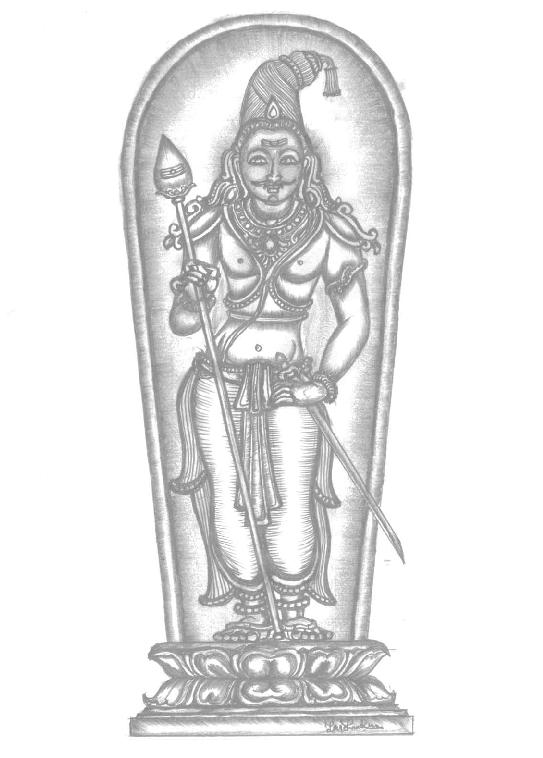
Sri Gurunatha Swamy painting

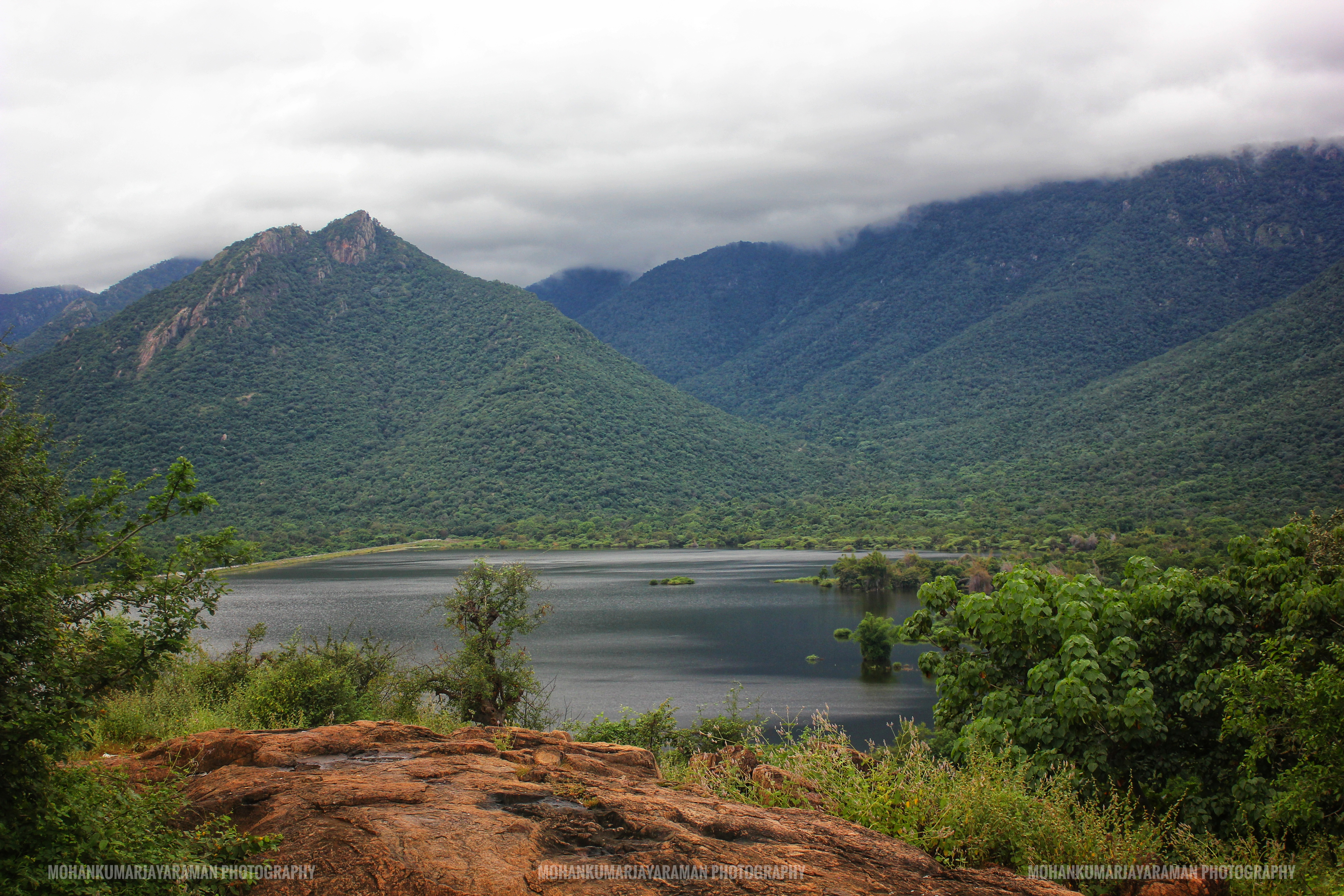
View of Varattupallam Dam

== Climate ==
The temperature is moderate throughout the year except during summer. Rainfall is moderate to high, uncertain and not well distributed. It is warm for most of the year. The city is not windy but the abundance of trees and vegetation surrounding the city makes its climate pleasant.

== Economy ==
Anthiyur is known for betel leaves, agriculture products including cotton, ground nut known as kadalai, sugarcane, cassava (known as kuchikilangu), corn (makkacholam), and textile garments. It has a large weekly markets in Tamil Nadu which assembles every Monday.

=== Horse fair ===
A horse fair (Kuthirai Santhai) is organized at the time of Sri Gurunatha Swamy temple festival in the Tamil month Aadi. Hundreds of horses of various breeds are exhibited in this fair. Other than horses, other domestic animals like cows, buffaloes, dogs and birds are also exhibited during the fair. The fair takes place for 5 to 6 days and it is witnessed by lakhs of people including farmers, pet enthusiasts and common people. Anthiyur horse fair is said to be organized right from the time of rule of Tipu Sultan.

== Transport ==
Anthiyur is well connected by roads with Gobichettipalayam and Sathyamangalam via Athani (Tamil Nadu), Erode via Bhavani. Tamil Nadu State Transport Corporation has a depot apart from a central bus stand in Anthiyur. The nearest railway station is Erode Junction (32 km), a major railway station from where trains ply to all over the country. The nearest airport is Coimbatore International Airport (100 km).

== Neighborhoods ==
- Bhavani
- Ammapettai
- Sathyamangalam
- Jambai
- Paruvatchi
- Ooratchikottai
- Komarapalayam
- Lakshmi Nagar
- Bhavanisagar
- Appakudal
