= Kooduthurai =

Holy site in Tamil Nadu, India

Coordinates: 11°05′31″N 78°03′11″E

Kooduthurai, or Mukkoodal is a holy place situated in Bhavani near Erode, Tamil Nadu, India.

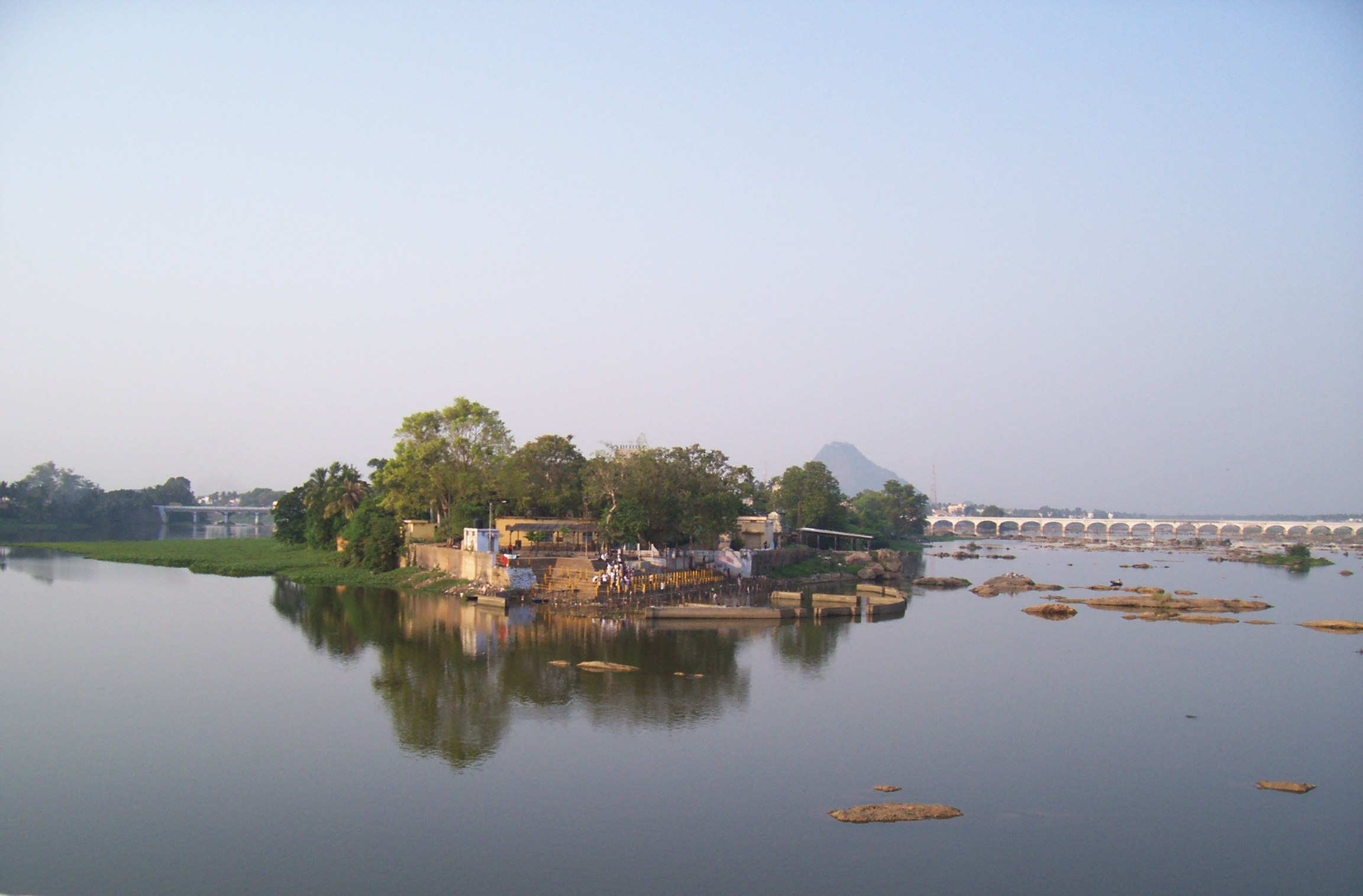
The confluence as seen from the National Highway

The place is situated at the confluence of three rivers: Kaveri, Bhavani and the mystic Amudha River. On the banks of Kooduthurai, Thirunana Sangameswarar Temple is located. The name comes from Tamil 'koodu' (join or mingle) and 'thurai' (river bed).
