= Moolakkarai =

Village in Thoothukudi district, Tamil Nadu, India

Moolakkarai is a village in Thoothukudi district, Tamil Nadu, India.

Hindu people are the majority in the village, and there are several Hindu temples.

== Temples ==
- Gallery
- Tejus Friends
- Moolakkarai
