= Jambai =

- Panchayat town
- Location in Tamil Nadu, India Jambai (Tamil Nadu)
- Coordinates: 11°30′17″N 77°38′01″E
- Country: India
- State: Tamil Nadu
- District: Erode

Area
  - Total: 24.29 km^{2} (9.38 sq mi)

Population (2011)
  - Total: 16,522
  - Density: 680.2/km^{2} (1,762/sq mi)

Languages
  - Official: Tamil
- Time zone: UTC+5:30 (IST)
- Postal code: 638312

Jambai is a panchayat town in Bhavani taluk of Erode district in the Indian state of Tamil Nadu. It is located on the banks of the Bhavani River in the north-western part of the state. Spread across an area of 24.29 km^{2} (9.38 sq mi), it had a population of 16,522 individuals as per the 2011 census.

== Geography and administration ==
Jambai is located on the banks of Bhavani River in the north-western part of the state. It is part of Bhavani taluk in the Gobichettipalayam division of Erode district in the Indian state of Tamil Nadu. Spread across an area of 24.29 km^{2} (9.38 sq mi), it is one of the 42 panchayat towns in the district.

The town panchayat is headed by a chairperson, who is elected by the members chosen by the people through direct elections. The town forms part of the Bhavani Assembly constituency that elects its member to the Tamil Nadu legislative assembly and the Tiruppur Lok Sabha constituency that elects its member to the Parliament of India.

== Demographics ==
As per the 2011 census, Jambai had a population of 16,522 individuals across 4,789 households. The population saw a marginal increase compared to the previous census in 2001 when 15,011 inhabitants were registered. The population consisted of 8,330 males and 8,192 females. About 1,399 individuals were below the age of six years. The entire population is classified as urban. The town has an average literacy rate of 65.9%. About 23.8% of the population belonged to scheduled castes.

About 56.6% of the eligible population were employed. In 2025, the Government of Tamil Nadu opened a veterinary clinic in the town. Hinduism was the majority religion which was followed by 96.2% of the population, with Islam (3.1%) and Christianity (0.6%) being minor religions.
