= Bhavani, Tamil Nadu =

Bhavani Thirunanaa
- Town
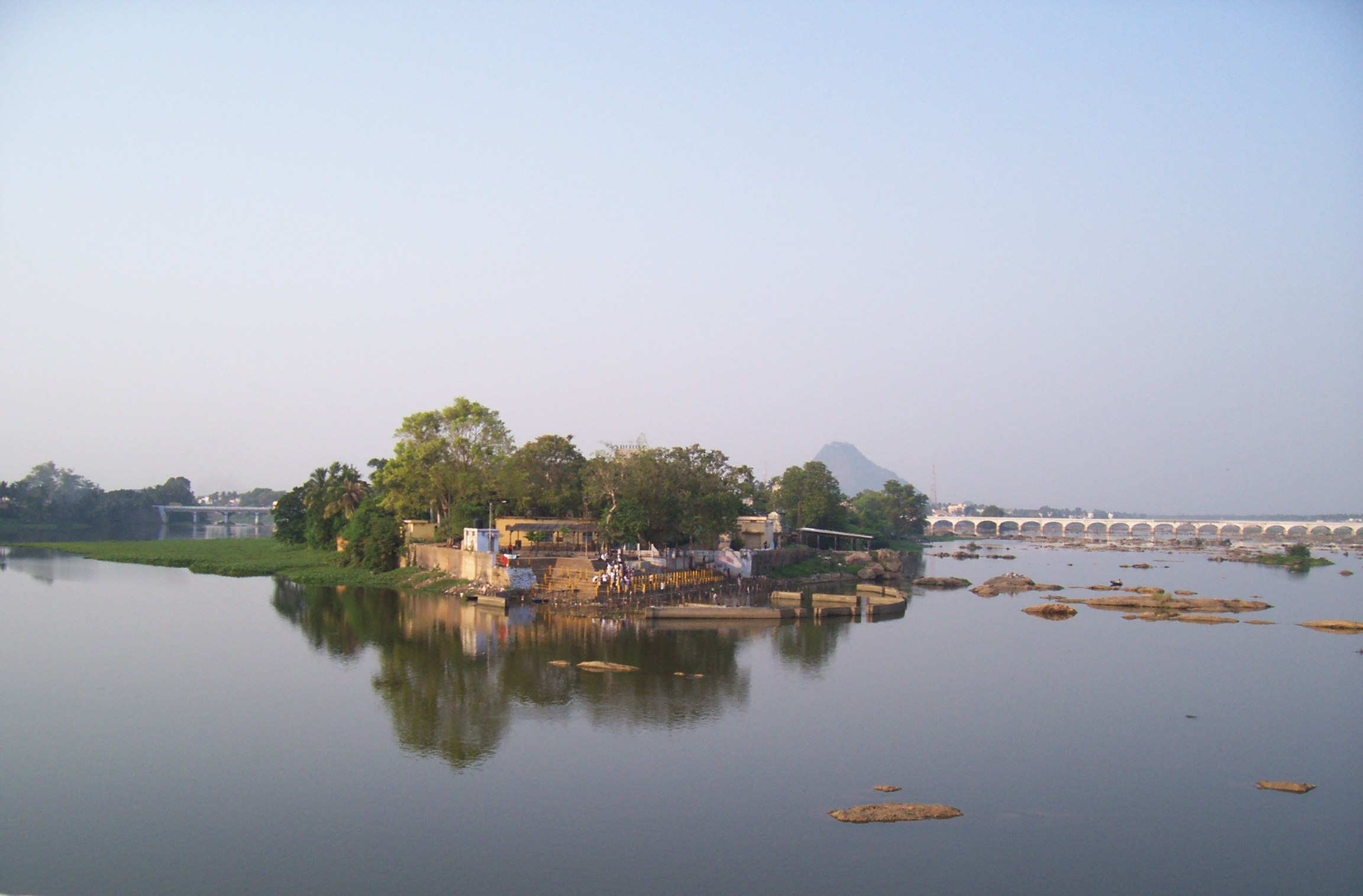
- Confluence of Bhavani and Kaveri rivers
- Nickname: Kooduthurai
- Bhavani, Tamil Nadu Bhavani (India)
- Coordinates: 11.447100°N 77.684000°E
- Country: India
- State: Tamil Nadu
- Region: West
- District: Erode
- Metropolitan: Erode

Government
  - Type: Second Grade Municipality
  - Body: Bhavani Municipality

Area
  - Total: 2.17 km^{2} (0.84 sq mi)
- Elevation: 193 m (633 ft)

Population (2011)
  - Total: 39,225
  - Density: 18,100/km^{2} (46,800/sq mi)

Languages
  - Official: Tamil
- Time zone: UTC+5:30 (IST)
- PIN: 638 301
- Telephone code: 04256
- Vehicle registration: TN 36

Bhavani is a municipality in Erode District, Tamil Nadu, India. It is located at the northern periphery of Erode City Municipal Corporation and is around 105 km (65 mi) from Coimbatore and 60 km (37 mi) from Tiruppur and Salem. Bhavani is also known as "Carpet City" due to its carpet industry; blankets and carpets manufactured in the town are known as Bhavani Jamakkalam. As of 2011, the town covers an area of 2.17 square kilometres (0.84 sq mi) and has a population of 39,225. It is a grade II municipality.

Bhavani is located 12 km from Erode Central and 14 kilometres (8.7 mi) north of Erode Junction. The Mettur Dam, which creates the Stanley Reservoir, is 41 kilometres (25 mi) from Bhavani. Sangameswarar Temple, one of the seven holy Shiva shrines of the Kongu Nadu, is located in Bhavani near the confluence of the rivers. The temple serves 18 villages surrounding the town. The Kooduthurai is the confluence of rivers Cauvery, Bhavani and invisible divine Amudha.

== History ==
Bhavani has a long historical significance as a sacred town at the confluence of the Kaveri and Bhavani rivers. The town was part of the ancient Kongu Nadu region and was ruled by the Cheras, Cholas, and later the Vijayanagara Empire. The Sangameswarar Temple, dedicated to Shiva, has been a centre of worship for centuries. During the British Raj, Bhavani was part of Coimbatore District under the Madras Presidency. The town developed as a weaving centre, leading to the emergence of the Bhavani Jamakkalam carpet industry.

== Geography ==
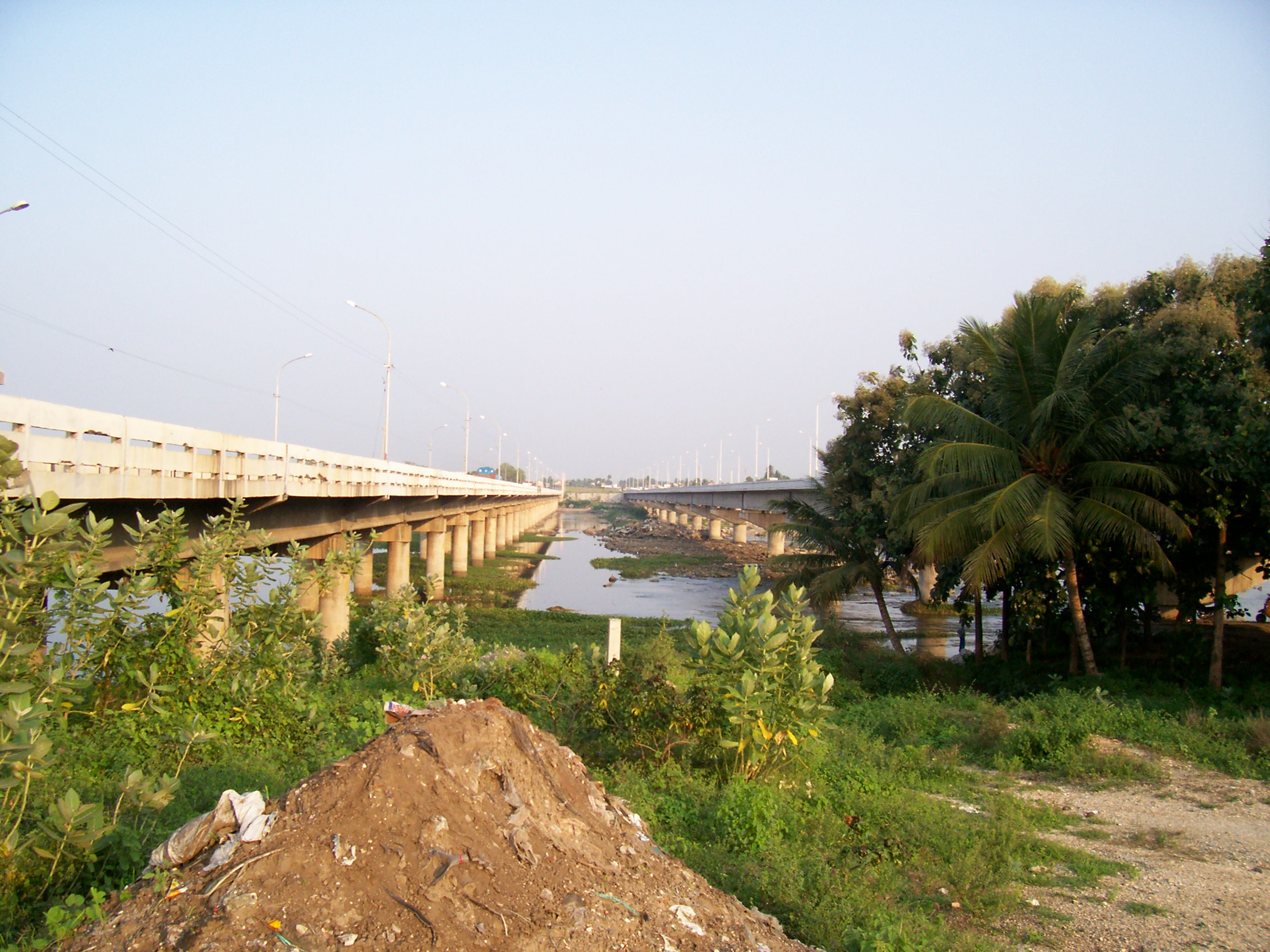
Bridges along the National Highway-544 across Kaveri river in the southern part of the town

Bhavani is located at 11.45°N 77.68°E. It has an average elevation of 193 metres (633 feet). It lies at the confluence of the rivers Kaveri, the largest river in Tamil Nadu and Bhavani, the second largest river in Tamil Nadu, with the invisible mystic Sarasvati River. Hence this place is known as the Triveni Sangam of South. The Sangameswarar Temple dedicated to Lord Shiva, built at the confluence of these rivers, is a sacred place for Hindus. The temple is located on the northern bank where the rivers meet. The five hill temples of this area such as Sankari, Tiruchengode, Padmagiri, Mangalagiri and Vedagiri are surrounding this Temple.

== Climate ==
Bhavani experiences a tropical climate with hot summers and moderate winters. The temperature ranges from 25 °C to 40 °C during summer (March–June) and 18 °C to 30 °C during winter (November–January). The town receives rainfall mainly during the northeast monsoon (October–December) and the southwest monsoon (June–September). The proximity to the Kaveri and Bhavani rivers contributes to the humidity levels in the region.

== Demographics ==
Religious census
Religion	Percent(%)
Hindu	93.33%
Muslim	4.24%
Christian	2.35%
Sikh	0.01%
Other	0.05%
No religion	0.02%

According to 2011 census, Bhavani had a population of 39,225 with a sex-ratio of 1,005 females for every 1,000 males, much above the national average of 929. A total of 3,519 were under the age of six, constituting 1,830 males and 1,689 females. Scheduled Castes and Scheduled Tribes accounted for 8.29% and 0.1% of the population respectively.

The average literacy of the town was 77.12%, compared to the national average of 72.99%. The town had a total of 11,147 households.

There were a total of 17,664 workers, comprising 65 cultivators, 61 main agricultural labourers, 1,114 in household industries, 15,575 other workers, 849 marginal workers, 8 marginal cultivators, 45 marginal agricultural labourers, 146 marginal workers in household industries and 650 other marginal workers.

As per the religious census of 2011, Bhavani had 93.33% Hindus, 4.24% Muslims, 2.35% Christians, 0.01% Sikhs, 0.05% following other religions and 0.02% following no religion or did not indicate any religious preference.

== Economy ==
The economy of Bhavani is primarily driven by the textile industry. The town is historically known for its Bhavani Jamakkalam (carpet and blanket) industry, which has received a geographical indication tag from the Government of India. Handloom and powerloom units are widespread in the town. Agriculture is practised in the surrounding areas, benefiting from the irrigation provided by the Kaveri and Bhavani rivers. The town also has a weekly shandy (market) and several commercial establishments along the main roads.

== Education ==
Namakkal district has several educational institutions offering programmes in engineering, medicine, arts, and science. Notable institutions include:

- Mahendra Engineering College, Mahendhirapuri
- JKKN Institutions, Komarapalayam
- K.S.R. College of Engineering, Tiruchengode
- Vivekanandha College of Engineering for Women, Tiruchengode
- Government Arts College, Namakkal
- Namakkal Kavignar Ramalingam Government Arts College for Women

The district has a literacy rate of approximately 71.26% as per the 2011 Census, which is slightly below the Tamil Nadu state average of 80.09%. Government and private schools affiliated with the Tamil Nadu State Board, CBSE, and matriculation boards operate across the district.

== Healthcare ==
Namakkal has a Government District Headquarters Hospital that provides medical services to the town and surrounding areas. The district also has government Taluk hospitals at Tiruchengode, Rasipuram, and other taluk headquarters. Several private hospitals and clinics operate in the town. Primary health centres (PHCs) and health sub-centres serve the rural population across the district.

== Culture ==
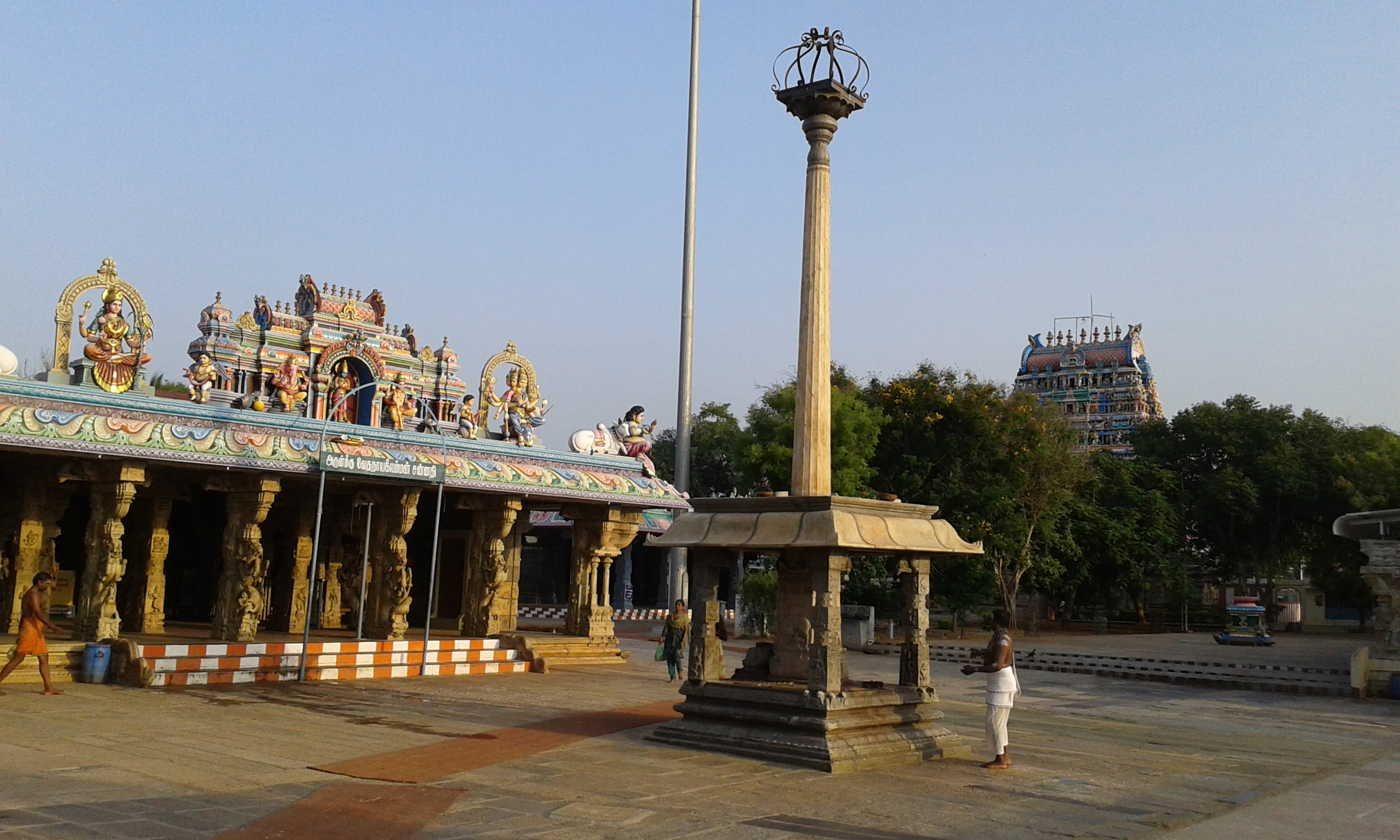
Sangameswarar Temple in Bhavani - the most prominent landmark

Sri Sellandiamman temple is the main temple for more than 18 villages surrounding Bhavani town. The mega-festival of Bhavani is celebrated during February and March (Masi in Tamil month). The festival has been celebrated for more than 45 days, and for over 100 years, every community in southern India has celebrated it as per the custom in Sri Sellandiamman temple during festival. Nearly 39 communities participate in this grand festival.

Kasi Vishalakshi Udanamar Kasi Viswanathar temple is located nearby Kududurai. This temple is fondly called Chinnakoil. Bairavasthami valipadu is famous in this temple. Navagrahas in this temple are with devis, i.e. all navagrahas are with their wives in separate madapam. Treated only few temples navagrahas with wives. Brahmotsavam is celebrated in Panguni month. On the day of Panguni Uthiram, the Lord of Thiruvanaikaval is taken in procession, and then the temple car festival begins. During karthikai month 1008 sangabishekam is held in temple in grand manner.

The holy waters of Bhavani are known as Kaveri theertham, Bhavani and Amirtha River, Surya theertham and Gayatri theertham. People perform last rites here.

The temple is situated at the confluence spot of the Kaveri and Bhavani rivers, known as Kooduthurai. Of the seven holy Shiva centers of the Kongu Region, Bhavani is one. The scriptural name is Thirunana. The 13-day car festival in the Tamil Month Chithirai (April–May) is the most famous in the temple attracting lakhs of devotees.

Also on Adiperukku day, Ammavasyas, especially Thai Ammavasya, eclipse days are devotionally followed in the Bhavani temple by taking bath in the rivers and performing rites. Many devotees from other states also come during November and December months corresponding to Tamil Karthikai and Margazhi.

During the Sabari mala season, many devotees come and do pujas in this temple, on their way to Kerala. Special pujas are performed to the Lord and Goddess on English and Tamil New Year days, Pongal and Deepavali days. The annual Bhrammotsavam here is celebrated in the month of Aadi (Cancer).

== Tourism ==
Bhavani is a popular pilgrimage and tourist destination due to its location at the confluence of the Kaveri and Bhavani rivers. Key attractions include:

- Sangameswarar Temple – An ancient Shiva temple at the river confluence, one of the seven holy shrines of Kongu Nadu
- Kooduthurai – The sacred confluence point (Triveni Sangam) where devotees perform rituals and last rites
- Sellandiamman Temple – A prominent Amman temple serving 18 surrounding villages
- Bhavani River Bridge – Offers scenic views of the Kaveri river
- Bhavani Island – A scenic spot near the river confluence

The town attracts pilgrims throughout the year, especially during the Pongal festival, Tamil New Year, and the annual Brahmotsavam of the Sangameswarar Temple.

== Politics ==
Bhavani is part of the Tiruppur Lok Sabha constituency in Tamil Nadu. Earlier, before the rearrangement of constituencies in 2008, it was part of the Gobichettipalayam constituency.

== Bhavani Jamakkalam ==
Bhavani Jamakkalam refers to blankets and carpets manufactured in Bhavani. It was recognized as a geographical indication by the Government of India in 2005–06. In the late nineteenth century, competition from British made textiles led Indian weavers to invent new types of garments. In Bhavani, a community of weavers called Jangamars weaved a type of blanket using colored coarse threads called Jamakkalam. The popularity of the product led to the production of jamakkalams by other weavers replacing the production of traditional sarees and other cloths.

== Transport ==
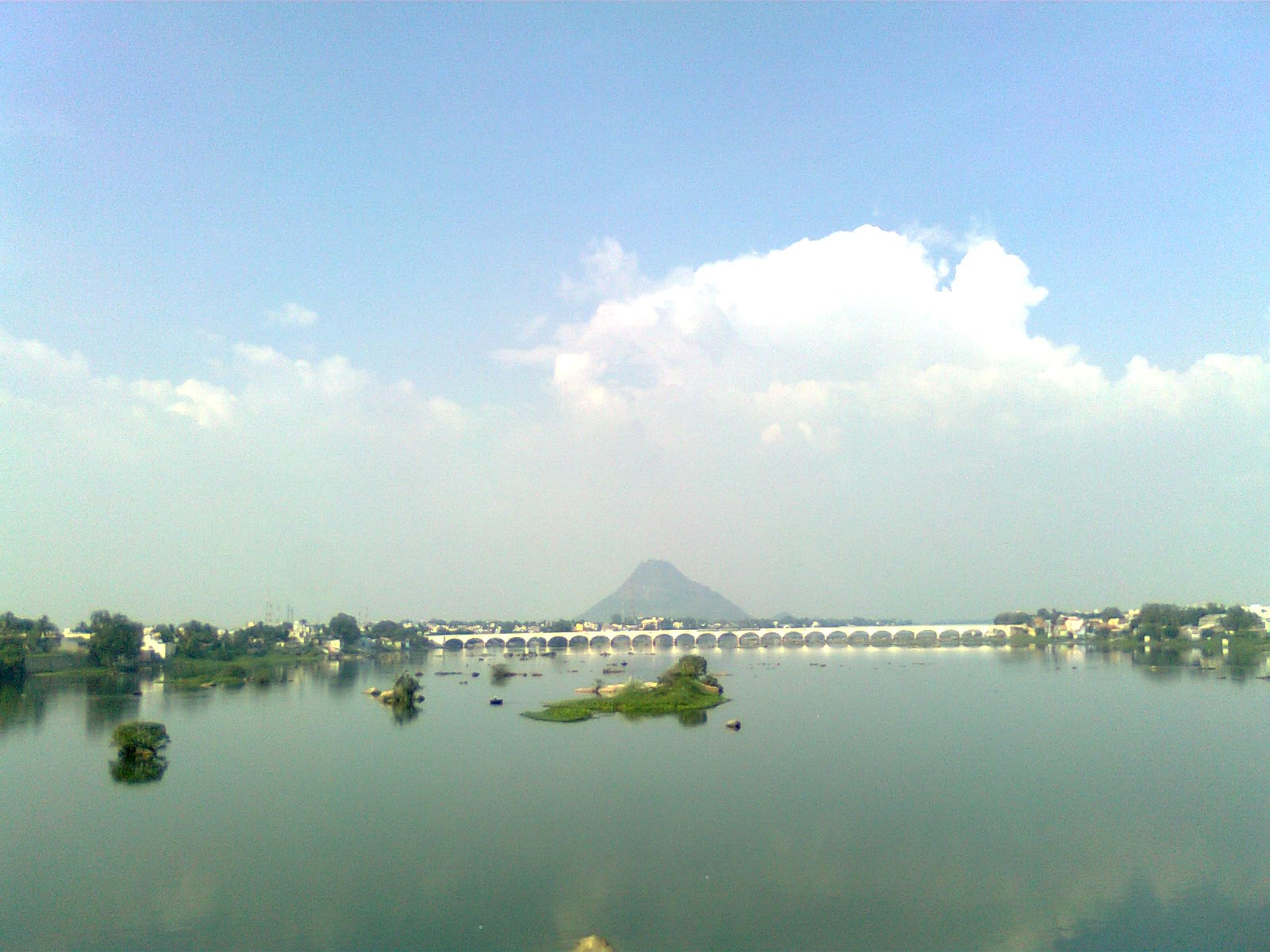
View from NH-544 bridge

Bhavani is connected with local buses to almost all parts of the district of Erode. The Bhavani bus station is located on the banks of the Kaveri river at the northern end of the town. City buses connect major areas like Erode Junction, Thindal, Central BS, Surampatti, Anthiyur, Komarapalayam, Gobichettipalayam, and Mettur. The town depends on two major National highways, NH-544 connecting Salem-Cochin and NH-544H connecting Thoppur-Erode. Erode is the major transportation hub for Bhavani.

== Neighborhoods ==
- Komarapalayam (2 km)
- Pallipalayam (13 km)
- Erode (14 km)
- Lakshmi Nagar (2 km)
- Ooratchikottai (2 km)
- Anthiyur (18 km)
- Paruvatchi (11 km)
- Chithode (6 km)
- Nasiyanur (15 km)
- Texvalley (11 km)
- Attayampalayam (12 km)
- Kavindapadi (16 km)
- Sankagiri (22 km)
