= Trichy-Tanjore Diocese of the Church of South India =

Diocese of the Church of South India in Tamil Nadu, India

The CSI Tiruchirappalli-Thanjavur Diocese

Location
- Country: India
- Ecclesiastical province: The Church of South India
- Headquarters: CSI Tiruchirappalli-Thanjavur Diocesan Office, Allithurai Road, Puthur, Tiruchirappalli, Tamilnadu, India - 620 017.

Statistics
- Members: 88,831 (as on the year 2000)

Information
- Secular priests: 100+

Current leadership
- Bishop: S. Samuel Rajadurai

Website
- https://trichytanjore.csi1947.com/

The Church of South India's CSI Tiruchirappalli Thanjavur Diocese (தென்னிந்திய திருச்சபை, திருச்சிராப்பள்ளி-தஞ்சாவூர் பேராயம்) is in the Indian state of Tamil Nadu. Established in 1947, the diocese was among the first 14 dioceses formed at the time of the founding of the Church of South India. Today, it is one of the 24 dioceses that constitute the Church of South India, a United Protestant denomination formed through the union of several Christian traditions.

== About the diocese ==
The diocese encompasses the following districts: Mayiladuthurai, Nagapattinam, Tiruvarur, Thanjavur, Tiruchirappalli; a part of Karur, Perambalur, Tirupur, Coimbatore, Cuddalore, Pudukottai, Ariyalur, and a part of the Union Territory of Puducherry & Karaikal. The diocese is organised into eight District Church Councils (DCC) for administrative purposes: Thanjavur, Tiruchirappalli, Perambalur-Collidam, Karur, Dharapuram, Udumalaipettai, Tharangambadi-Nagapattinam, and Anaimalai Hills(Valparai). With 88,831 members as on the year 2000, the diocese is led by a bishop and more than 100 male and female ordained pastors who together carry out the diocese's mission. The United Kingdom's Leicester and the diocese are partners. The diocese's primary goal is to empower Dalits and women.

== Ministry ==
The diocese does Education Ministry, Hospital Ministry, Tribal Welfare Ministry, Mission and Evangelisation Ministry and Ministry among women. Education Ministry: The diocese has 52 primary schools, 2 high schools, 17 higher secondary schools (including St.Peter's Higher Secondary School, Thanjavur, which taught English to Indians for the first time in India since 1784, St.John's Vestry Higher Secondary School and Bishop Heber Higher Secondary School, Teppakulam, Tiruchirappalli in education service since 1763 and 1762 respectively), 2 nursing schools, 1 industrial training centre and 5 colleges specialised in Arts & Science, Management, Nursing & Community Welfare (including Bishop Thorp College, Dharapuram, the first self-financing college in Tamil Nadu State). All institutions of this diocese are religious minority educational institutions. These institutions are some of the earliest institutions of the Tamil Nadu state started by the then missionaries with a highly dedicated sacrifice and a vision of super quality education in the area wherever they are located. Most of these institutions are residential. Hospital Ministry: The diocese has 2 general hospitals; The CSI Mission General Hospital is located in Uraiyur, Tiruchirappalli and the CSI Dr.Anne Booth Mission Hospital in CSI Mission Compound, Dharapuram. These hospitals are multi-speciality hospitals on service committed and dedicated to the glory of God through the ministry of healing with modern facilities, infrastructure, dedicated management and staff. Tribal Welfare Ministry: The diocese operates Tribal Welfare programmes in the tribal area whichever is located in the jurisdiction of the diocese. Mission and Evangelisation Ministry: The diocese does a Mission and Evangelisation programme within the limit of the diocese's territories. Ministry among women: Having the motto of empowering women in the diocese, the diocese operates various programmes and welfare measures for the development of the lifestyle and social status of the women. Diocesan Press and Book: The diocese has its own printing press at Uraiyur, Tiruchirappalli; where they print all their reading materials. They also publish a book called "Thiruchabai Malar" (திருச்சபை மலர்) on every month which is circulated internally.

== Officers of the Council ==
The diocese is headed by a bishop, who is an elected presbyter through the Diocesan Council. He is considered the head of the diocese and all the institutions belonging to the diocese. Other than the Bishop as the head of all, the Clerical Secretary position takes care of the Pastoral & Evangelical workers in the diocese, the Lay Secretary position takes care of all the Lay Workers in the diocese, the Educational Secretary position takes care of all Educational Institutions and the workers of those institutions and as usual of all the organisations, this diocese also has a position for the Diocesan Treasurer to manage all the incomes and expenditures of the diocese.

== Bishops of the diocese and their tenure ==
Following is the list of bishops who served in the Diocese.

=== Edgar Bentley Thorp (1947-1962) ===
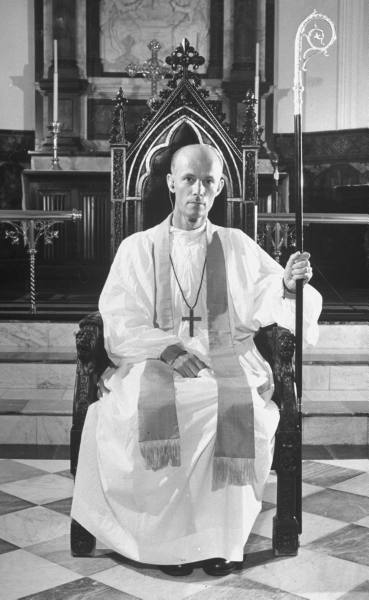
Edgar Bentley Thorp

Wesleyan Methodist missionary Edgar Bentley Thorp, who was born in Bengaluru was the first Bishop of the diocese. He was consecrated as CSI bishop in St. George's Cathedral, Chennai on 27 September 1947 when he was aged 42. He was the son of a former missionary and Chairman of Mysore District, Rev.William Hubert Thorp and was one among the three Methodists consecrated as CSI bishops. He was educated at Kingswood School and with degrees from Oxford and Cambridge. After a year of studying Comparative Religion at Marburg, Thorp went to the Trichinopoly (Tiruchirappalli) District in 1930. He was the Principal of the Bible School at Dharapuram, training village evangelists. He was the Chairman of the District from 1945 to 1947. He was guiding the diocese as bishop for 15 years and left India in 1962 on health grounds. His ministry among Christians in the Dharapuram mass movement area and on the tea plantations in Valparai area, was underpinned by his simple lifestyle; and as bishop, the impartiality of his leadership fostered unity between the Anglican minority and Methodist majority in the diocese. He died at Prestatyn on 1 September 1991.

Bishop Thorp Arts and Science College in Dharapuram is named in his remembrance. Also, the diocese has named a lot of constructions in some of its institutions in his remembrance. For example, Thorp Block at Bishop Heber Higher Secondary School in 2001 Puthur, Tiruchirappalli, Bishop Thorp hostel for women at Bishop Heber College 2008 Tiruchirappalli and Bishop Thorp Memorial Church at Chinnaputhur Pastorate in Dharapuram, 2014 Ammapatti village.

=== David Chellappa (1962-1964) (Interim) ===
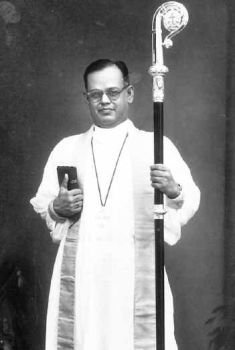
David Chellappa

David Chellappa (1905–1964), the first Indian Bishop of the Diocese of Madras of the Church of South India. was requested by Arnold Henry Legg, the then Moderator of CSI, to extend his service and leadership to Tiruchirappalli Thanjavur diocese, as Thorp left India on a health emergency and couldn't plan for a backup then. Born in Tanjore in 1905, Chellappa was the son of Justice Daniel Chellappa and Elizabeth Daniel Chellappa, daughter of Munsif A. David Pillay, who served as the Legal Adviser to King Serfoji II of the Bhonsle dynasty in Thanjavur. Ordained in 1933 by Edward Harry Mansfield Waller, he was sent to Tiruchirappalli district to serve two churches - Mettupatti and Irungalur. Graduated with a Master of Arts degree from Durham University in 1954. He became Bishop of Madras the following year. During his stay in United States of America, the famous Hope College, Holland, Michigan State, conferred an honorary Doctor of Divinity [D.D] degree on Chellappa. He was guiding the diocese as an "interim Bishop" till 7 February 1964 and died the same year on August 25.

=== Solomon Doraiswamy (1964-1982) ===
Solomon Doraiswamy was the first Indian bishop to lead the diocese. When Thorp left India, the diocese was in a state of confusion. The Tiruchirappalli Thanjavur diocese had failed to make a panel. As per the constitution, they were required to send a panel of at least two names. Owing to the internal troubles, they had sent only one name and so the Synod of CSI appointed Doraiswamy as the Bishop in Tiruchirappalli Thanjavur diocese. He was officially consecrated as the bishop on 8 February 1964 at St. Peter's Church (built by Christian Friedrich Schwarz), Thanjavur by Arnold Henry Legg (Moderator) and co-consecrated by Pereji Solomon (Deputy Moderator). Chellappa's ring, cross and Staff were used in the consecration to Doraiswamy as they were not arranged on time.

During the fourteenth Church of South India Synod held from 10 to 14 January 1974 at the Women's Christian College, Madras, Doraiswamy was elected as the Deputy Moderator and held the office from 1974 to 1980 for over three terms (1974–1976; 1976-1978 and 1978–1980). Again during the seventeenth Church of South India Synod held from 10 to 14 January 1980 at Madras Christian College, Tambaram, Doraiswamy became the Moderator and held the office for a term up to 1982. During his tenure, he rejuvenated and started so many people-friendly and people-development projects. One of his achievements was the rebirth of Bishop Heber College, Tiruchirapalli. The Senate of Serampore College (University) awarded an honorary doctorate degree to Doraiswamy in 1981. C.S.I. Bishop Solomon Doraisawmy College of Arts and Science in Karur is named in his remembrance. He guided the diocese for 18 years and retired at his 65th age in 1982.

=== Rajamanickam Paulraj (1982-1998) ===
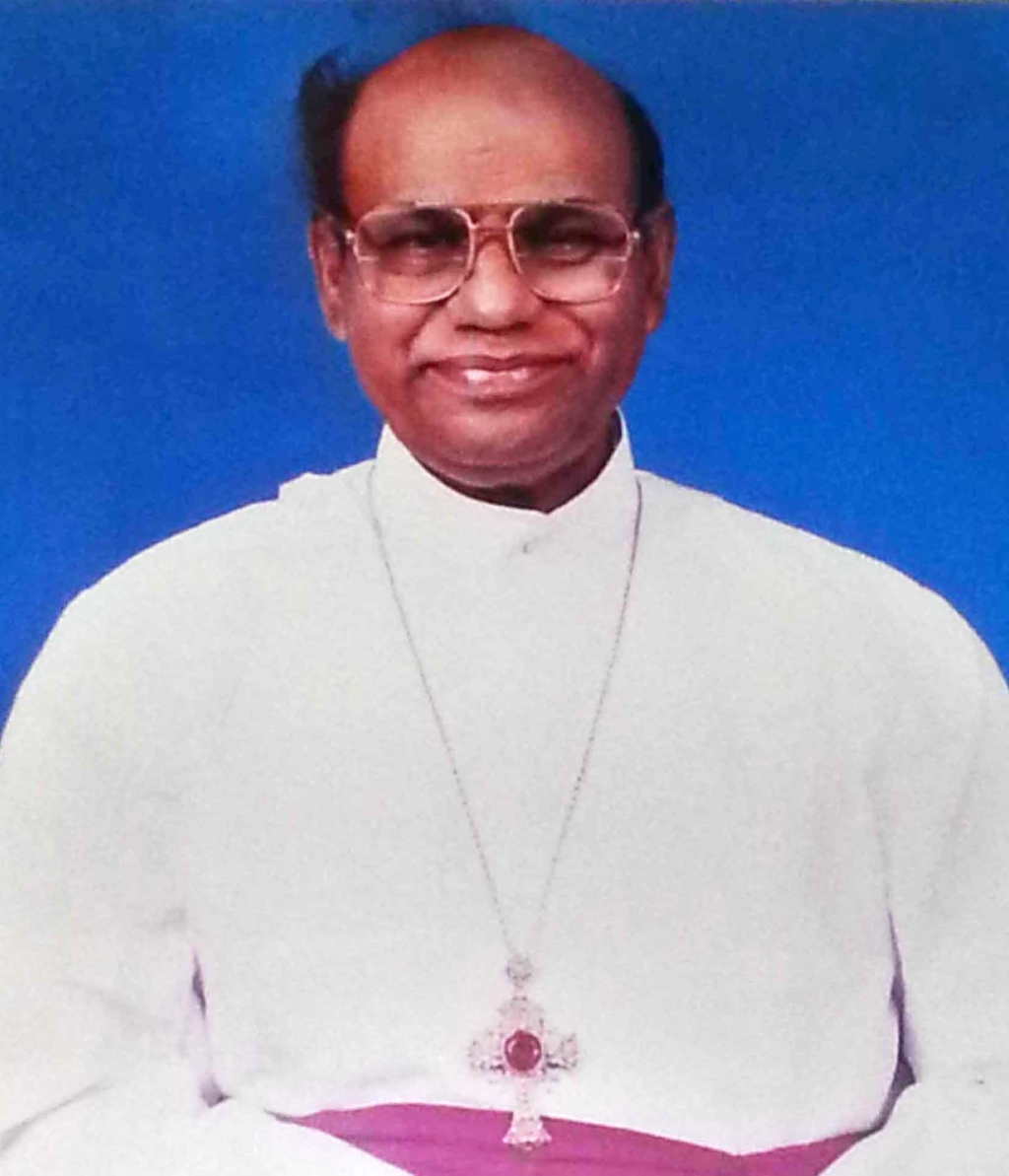
R. Paulraj

Rajamanickam Paulraj was elected and consecrated as the third Bishop of the Tiruchirappalli Thanjavur diocese on 21 January 1982. He guided the diocese for 16 years. A scholar and a bishop who was awarded three doctorates. He was actively involved in the CSI Synod as a bishop and was elected to serve as the Deputy Moderator of the Church of South India for the term 1994 – 1996 during the twenty-fourth Church of South India Synod held in January 1994 at the Bishop Heber College, Tiruchirappalli. Considering the need for higher education in Dharapuram area, he took great efforts to start "Bishop Thorp College" affiliated to the Bharathiar University, Coimbatore in 1984 – under the C.S.I Tiruchirappalli Thanjavur Diocese. Thus "Bishop Thorp College" emerged as the "First Self-Financing College" in the state of Tamil Nadu. He died on 18 January 2016.

=== Daniel James Seenivasan (1998 - 2008) ===
Daniel James Seenivasan was elected and consecrated as the fourth Bishop of the Tiruchirappalli Thanjavur diocese at Bishop Heber College campus in 1998. Indisputably known for his exemplary administration skills, he guided the diocese in this capacity for 10 years. He retired at his 65th age in 2008.

=== Gnanamuthu Paul Vasantha Kumar (2008 - 2018) ===
Gnanamuthu Paul Vasantha Kumar was enthroned as the fifth Bishop of the Tiruchirappalli Thanjavur diocese in the year 2008. He retired at his 67th age.

=== Dhanraj Chandrasekaran (2018 - 2024) ===
Dhanraj Chandrasekaran has been elected and consecrated as the sixth bishop of the diocese till he retired at his 67th year of age, upon attaining superannuation.

=== Samuel Rajadurai (Incumbent from 2025) ===
Samuel Rajadurai has been elected and consecrated as the seventh bishop of the diocese, effective December 6, 2025.

== Theological education ==
The diocese recognises theological degrees granted by institutions affiliated with the Board of Theological Education of the Senate of Serampore College. These might include:

- Academy of Integrated Christian Studies, Aizawl, Mizoram
- Aizawl Theological College, Aizawl, Mizoram
- Allahabad Bible Seminary, Prayagraj, Uttar Pradesh
- Andhra Christian Theological College, Hyderabad, Telangana
- Baptist Theological College, Pfütsero, Nagaland
- Bethel Bible College, Guntur, Andhra Pradesh
- Bishop's College, Kolkata, West Bengal
- Clark Theological College, Aolijen, Mokokchung, Nagaland
- Calcutta Bible Seminary, Kolkata, West Bengal
- Calvin Institute of Theology, Yacharam Village, Telangana
- Concordia Theological Seminary, Kottar-Parvathipuram Road, Nagercoil, Tamilnadu
- Dharma Jyothi Vidya Peeth, Faridabad, Haryana
- Eastern Theological College, Rajabari, Jorhat, Assam
- Faith Theological Seminary, Adoor, Kerala
- Federated Faculty for Research in Religion & Culture (FFRRC), Kottayam, Kerala
- Gossner Theological College, Ranchi, Jharkhand
- Gujarat United School of Theology, Ahmedabad, Gujarat
- Gurukul Lutheran Theological College & Research Institute, Chennai, Tamil Nadu
- Harding Theological College, Edenbari, Tura, Meghalaya
- John Roberts Theological Seminary, Shillong, Meghalaya
- Karnataka Theological College, Mangalore, Karnataka
- Kerala Theological Seminary, Kottarakara, Kerala
- Kerala United Theological Seminary, Thiruvananthapuram, Kerala
- Leonard Theological College, Jabalpur, Madhya Pradesh
- Manipur Theological College, Kangpokpi, Manipur
- Madras Theological Seminary & College, Kilpauk, Chennai, Tamil Nadu
- Malankara Syrian Orthodox Theological Seminary, Mulanthuruthy, Ernakulam, Kerala
- Mar Thoma Theological Seminary, Kottayam, Kerala
- Mar Thoma Episcopal Jubilee Institute of Evangelism, Manjadi, Tiruvalla, Kerala
- Master's College of Theology, Visakhapatnam, Andhra Pradesh
- Methodist Bible Seminary, Vasad, Gujarat
- Mennonite Brethren Centenary Bible College, Shamshabad, Telangana
- Nav Jyoti Post Graduate and Research Centre (NJPGRC), Faridabad, Haryana
- New Theological College, Dehradun, Uttarakhand
- North India Institute of Post Graduate Theological Studies (NIIPGTS), Serampore, Kolkata, West Bengal
- Orissa Christian Theological College, Ganjam, Odisha
- Orthodox Theological Seminary, Kottayam, Kerala
- Santal Theological College, Maharo, Dumka, Jharkhand
- Serampore College (SC), Serampore, Kolkata, West Bengal
- South Asia Theological Research Institute (SATHRI), Bengaluru
- St. Andrew's Theological College, Dhaka, Bangladesh
- St. Thomas Orthodox Theological Seminary, Kalmeshwar, Maharashtra
- South India Biblical Seminary, Bangarapet, Karnataka
- Tamil Nadu Theological Seminary (TTS), Madurai, Tamil Nadu
- Theological College of Lanka, Pilimatalawa, Sri Lanka
- Trinity Theological College, Dimapur, Nagaland
- Trulock Theological Seminary, Imphal, Manipur
- Union Biblical Seminary, Pune, Maharashtra
- United Theological College (UTC), Bengaluru, Karnataka
- United Theological Seminary of Maharashtra, Pune, Maharashtra
- Witter Theological College, Wokha, Nagaland

== List of Pastorates in Tiruchirappalli Thanjavur Diocese ==
=== List of Pastorates in Anaimalai (Valparai) DCC ===
- Anaimudi Pastorate
- Henry Edwin Bleby Pastorate
- Iyerpadi Pastorate
- Karumalai Pastorate
- Mudis Pastorate
- Nadumalai Pastorate
- Sholayar Nagar Pastorate
- Sirukundra Pastorate
- Valparai Pastorate
- Vellonie Pastorate
- Waterfalls Pastorate

=== List of Pastorates in Dharapuram DCC ===
- Avinashipalayam Pastorate
- Bethel (Dharapuram) Pastorate
- Chinnaputhur Pastorate
- Dharapuram Town Pastorate
- Dharapuram Central Pastorate
- Devanurpudur Pastorate
- Gudimangalam Pastorate
- Kannivadi Pastorate
- Kundadam Pastorate
- Koothampoondi Pastorate
- Kallivalasu Pastorate
- Kolathupalayam Pastorate
- Madathukulam Pastorate
- Manakadavu Pastorate
- Mulanur Pastorate
- Perunkarunaipalayam Pastorate
- St. Thomas Pastorate (Dharapuram Rural)
- Thalavaipattinam Pastorate
- Thayampalayam Pastorate
- Udumalaipettai Pastorate
- Uthiyur Pastorate
- Vellakovil Pastorate

=== List of Pastorates in Karur DCC ===
- Aravakurichi Pastorate
- Chinnadharapuram Pastorate
- Karur Paramathi (K.Paramathi) Pastorate
- Karur Pastorate
- Kulithalai Pastorate
- Musiri Pastorate
- Puliyur Pastorate
- Thalavapalayam Pastorate
- Thanthonimalai Pastorate
- Thennilai Pastorate
- Visuvanathapuri Pastorate

=== List of Pastorates in Perambalur-Kollidam DCC ===
- Annamangalam Pastorate
- Ariyalur Pastorate
- Chidambaram Pastorate
- Irungalur Pastorate
- Jayankondam Pastorate
- Lalgudi Pastorate
- Mettu Irungalur Pastorate
- Mettupatti Pastorate
- Perambalur Pastorate
- Pudukottai Village Pastorate
- Pullambadi Pastorate
- Thuraiyur Pastorate
- Viragalur Pastorate

=== List of Pastorates in Thanjavur DCC ===
- Aathanur Pastorate
- Anaikaadu Pastorate
- Aranthangi Pastorate
- Kumbakonam Pastorate
- Pattukottai Pastorate
- St. Peter's Church & Pastorate
- St. Andrews Church & Pastorate
- The Fort Christ Church & Pastorate

=== List of Pastorates in Tharangambadi-Nagapattinam DCC ===
- Wesley Church Mannargudi Town Pastorate
- Karaikal Pastorate
- Mannargudi Rural Pastorate
- Mayiladuthurai Pastorate
- Melanatham Pastorate
- Nagapattinam Pastorate
- Nangur Pastorate
- Thiruvarur Pastorate

=== List of Pastorates in Tiruchirappalli DCC ===
- All Saints Church & Pastorate
- Bethel Church & Pastorate
- Christ Church GOC. North – D & Pastorate
- Emmanuel Church & Pastorate
- Holy Trinity Church, Kattur & Pastorate
- Manapparai Pastorate
- OFT Church & Pastorate
- Redeemer's Church & Pastorate
- St. Andrew's Church & Pastorate
- St. Christopher's Church & Pastorate
- St. Mathew's Church & Pastorate
- St. John's Church & Pastorate
- Luke's Church & Pastorate (Bishop Heber College Chapel, Tabernacle of Testimony)
- St. Marks, Karumandapam Pastorate
- St. Paul's Church & Pastorate
- St. Peter's GOC Church & Pastorate
- St. Thomas Church & Pastorate
- The Fort Christ Church & Pastorate

== Bishops appointed in India by Church of England before the Church of South India Union ==
- The Bishop Thomas Fanshawe Middleton, consecrated on 1814; died at Calcutta on 8 July 1822 due to sunstroke and is buried under the altar of St. John's Church, Kolkata the then cathedral of Calcutta.
- The Bishop Reginald Heber, consecrated on 1 June 1823 and arrived at Calcutta on 10 October 1823; died at Trichinopoly on 3 April 1826 due to a cold stroke and buried under the north side of the altar of St. John's Church, Trichinopoly(Tiruchirappalli) where he preached his last sermon.
- The Bishop John Thomas James, consecrated on 3 June 1827 and arrived at Calcutta on 18 January 1828; sailed for China on 9 August 1828, but died due to illness during the voyage on 22 August 1828 and buried at sea a few miles off Singapore.
- The Bishop John Matthew Turner, consecrated 17 May 1829 and arrived at Calcutta on 10 December 1829; died at Calcutta on 7 July 1831 and buried in the churchyard of St. John's Church, Kolkata, Calcutta.
- The Metropolitan of India, Bishop Daniel Wilson, First Metropolitan of India and Ceylon; consecrated and arrived at Calcutta on 5 November 1832; died at Calcutta on 2 January 1858 and is buried in St. Paul's Cathedral, Kolkata, Calcutta.
- The Metropolitan of India, The Bishop George Edward Lynch Cotton, consecrated on 1858; drowned in the Ganges at Kushtea while consecrating a cemetery on 7 October 1866. His body was never recovered.
- The Metropolitan of India, The Bishop Robert Milman, consecrated on 2 February 1867. He caught a chill when travelling from Calcutta to Peshawur and died at Rawal Pindi in February 1876. He had never married.
- The Metropolitan of India, The Bishop Edward Ralph Johnson, consecrated on 1876; resigned due to illness on 1898; died outside India on 11 September 1912.
- The Metropolitan of India, Bishop James Edward Cowell Welldon, consecrated 1898; resigned owing to ill health in early 1902 and disagreement with the Viceroy, Lord Curzon; was a lifelong bachelor, and for nearly fifty years had the close companionship of a manservant, Edward Hudson Perkins, from whose death in 1932 Welldon never recovered and died at Sevenoaks, Kent, on 17 June 1937 aged eighty-three.
- The Metropolitan of India, The Bishop Reginald Stephen Copleston, consecrated Bishop of Colombo, in Westminster Abbey, 1875 and served for 27 years in Colombo; translated to Calcutta on 20 May 1902; resigned on 20 January 1913 and died at Putney in England on 19 April 1925.
- The Metropolitan of India, The Bishop George Alfred Lefroy, consecrated Bishop of Lahore on 1 November 1899; translated to Calcutta on 19 February 1913; died on 1 January 1919 in the close of the Calcutta Cathedral.
- The Metropolitan of India, The Bishop Foss Westcott, consecrated as Bishop of Chota-Nagpur on 1905; translated to Calcutta 1919 and served as The Metropolitan of India, Burma and Ceylon until 1945. He resigned and retired in 1945 to spend the last four years of his life at St. Paul's School in Darjeeling. There he died and was buried in a garden on the school grounds
- The Metropolitan of India, The Bishop George Clay Hubback, was consecrated as The Bishop of Assam in 1924; translated to Calcutta and became the last European Metropolitan of India in 1945; retired in 1950 and died on 2 November 1955.

The Bishops of Calcutta became Metropolitans in 1835; Royal Letters Patent, dated 10 October 1835.

Bishops Appointed in India by Church of England Before The Church of South India Union

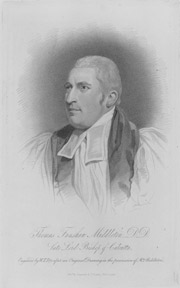
Thomas Fanshawe Middleton (First Bishop of Calcutta 1814–1822)

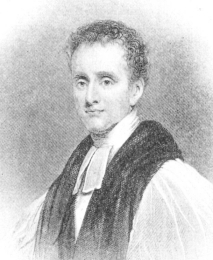
Reginald Heber (Bishop of Calcutta 1823–1826)

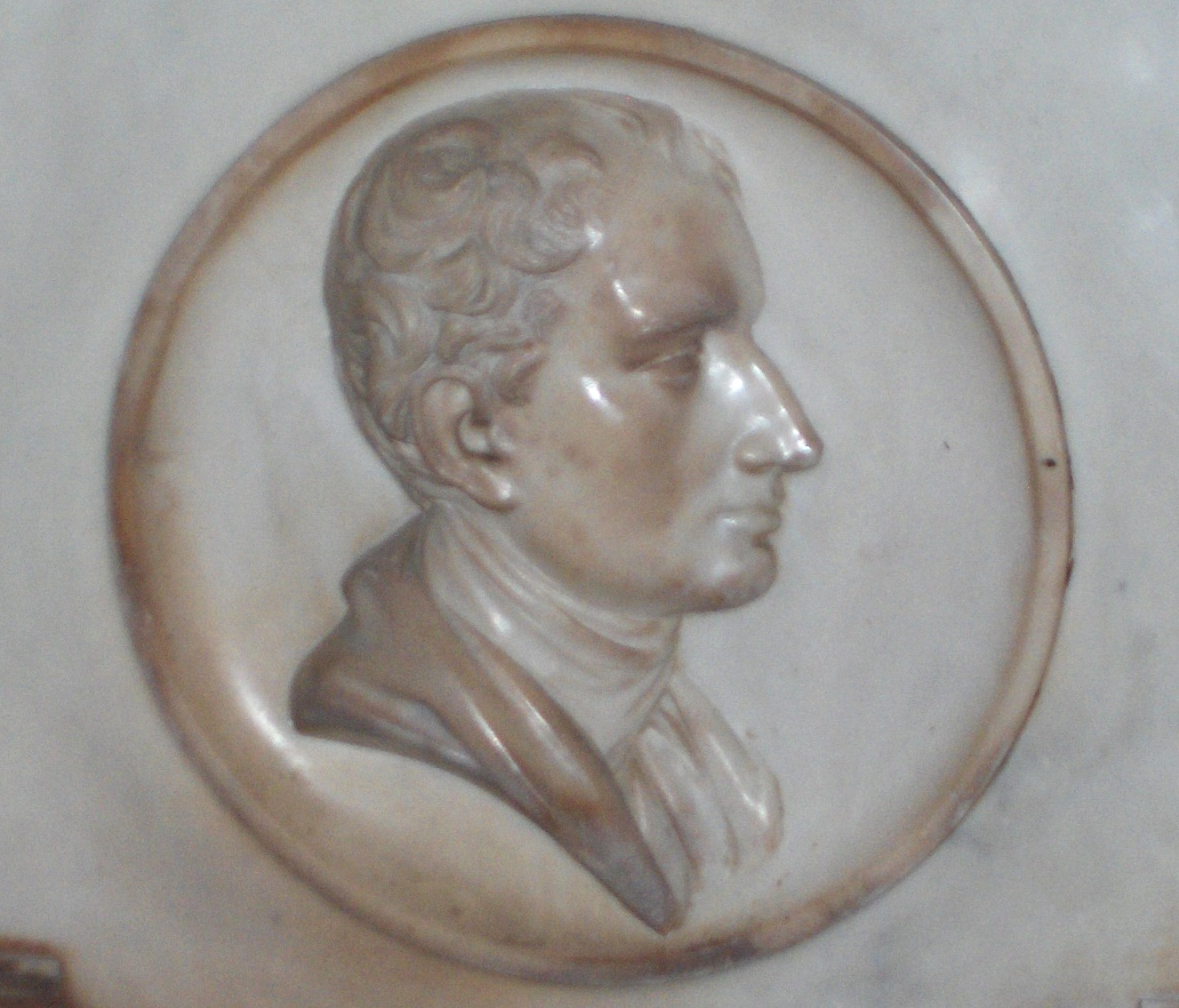
John Thomas James (Bishop of Calcutta 1827–1828)

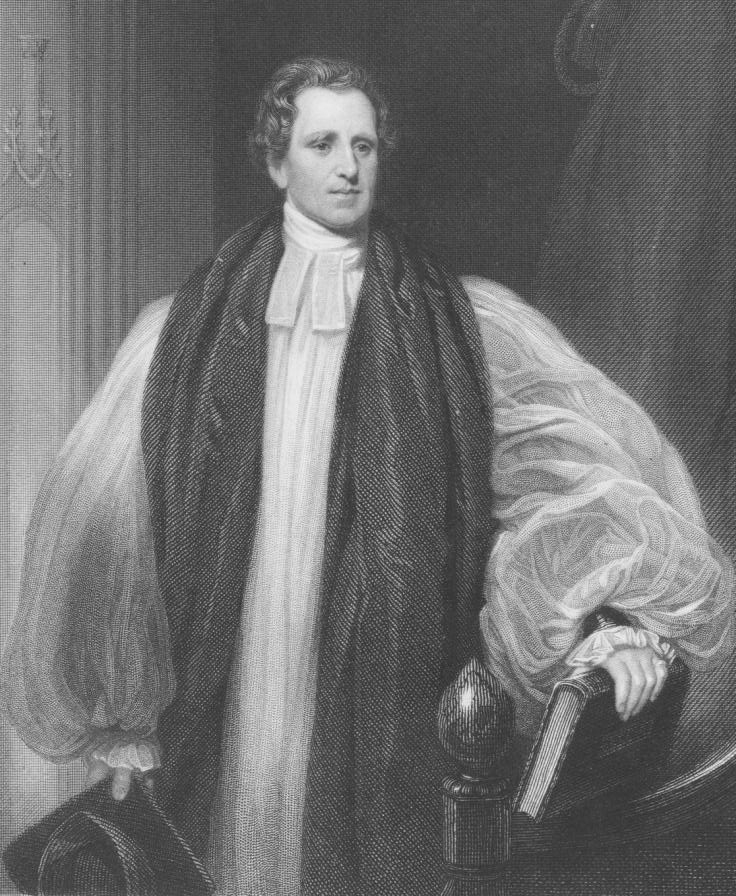
Daniel Wilson (Bishop of Calcutta, First Metropolitan Bishop of India & Ceylon 1832–1858)

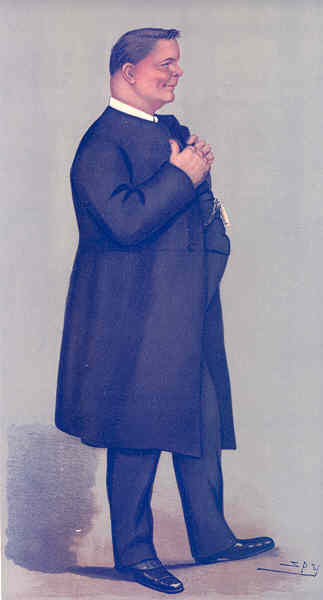
James Edward Cowell Welldon (Bishop of Calcutta 1898–1902)
