= Dharapuram division =

Coordinates: 10.73°N 77.52°E

Dharapuram division or Dharapuram sub-district is a revenue division in the Tiruppur district of Tamil Nadu, India. It is One Of The Three Revenue Divisions of Tiruppur district Other Two are Tiruppur and Udumalaipettai block. Dharapuram division Includes Two Talukas Dharapuram, Kangeyam and five panchayat unions, Dharapuram, Kangeyam, Vellakoil, Mulanur, Kundadam. Dharapuram Division has an area of 2057 km^{2}, which is 40% of the total area of Tiruppur District and 1.58% of Tamil Nadu. Dharapuram Division has a population of 5,29,654.
