= Sukkampalayam =

- Village
- Location in Tamil Nadu, India
- Coordinates: 11.006697°N 77.249596°E
- Country: India
- State: Tamil Nadu
- District: Tirupur
- Metro: Coimbatore

Population (2001)
  - Total: 3,395

Languages
  - Official: Tamil
- Time zone: UTC+5:30 (IST)
- PIN: 641662
- Telephone code: +91-422
- Vehicle registration: TN 39
- Sex ratio: 1:1 ♂/♀

Sukkampalayam is a village in Palladam Taluk in Tiruppur District in the Indian state Tamil Nadu. Sukkampalayam is located 35 km far from Coimbatore City, 6.7 km distance from its Taluk Main Town Palladam . Sukkampalayam is 24 km far from Tirupur. Palladam HiTech Weaving Park(PHWP) is located on the outskirts of Sukkampalayam.

== Demographics ==
As of 2011 India census, Sukkampalayam had a population of 4420. Males constitute 50.63% (2238) of the population and females 49.37% (2182).

As of 2001 India census, Sukkampalayam had a population of 3395. Males constitute 50.5% of the population and females 49.5%.

== Adjacent communities ==
=== Villages ===
- Semmipalayam(.4 km)
- Kodangipalayam(2.7 km)
- Paruvai(5.7 km)
- Karadivavi(6.5 km)
- Poomalur(7.8 km)

=== Towns ===
- Palladam(6.7 km)
- Uttukkuli(16.8 km)
- Tirupur(18.2 km)
- Avanashi(20.4 km)
