= Palladam block =

Palladam block is a revenue block in the Tiruppur district of Tamil Nadu, India. It has a total of 20 panchayat villages. Palladam is also a town within the block and district, known for its textile industry.

== Villages ==
- K.Krishnapuram
- Anuppatti
- Puliampatti, Kamanaickenpalayam
- Mallegoundenpalayam
- Paruvai
- Karadivavi
- Vadugapalayam Pudhur
- Kodangipalayam
- Arumuthampalayam
- Chindampalam
- Ichipatti
- Karaipudhur
- Manikkapuram
- Banikkampatti
- Boomalur
- Semmipalayam
- Chukkampalayam
- Velampalayam
