= Manickapuram, Tiruppur District =

Manickapuram
- Village
- Interactive map of Manickapuram
- Coordinates: 11°01′30″N 77°16′32″E
- Country: India
- State: Tamil Nadu
- District: Tiruppur
- Taluk: Palladam

Languages
  - Tamil: Main language

Manickapuram is a village in Palladam Taluk in Tiruppur District of the Indian state of Tamil Nadu. It is located 19 km (11.8 miles) south of District headquartersTiruppur. 465 km (288.9 miles) from Chennai

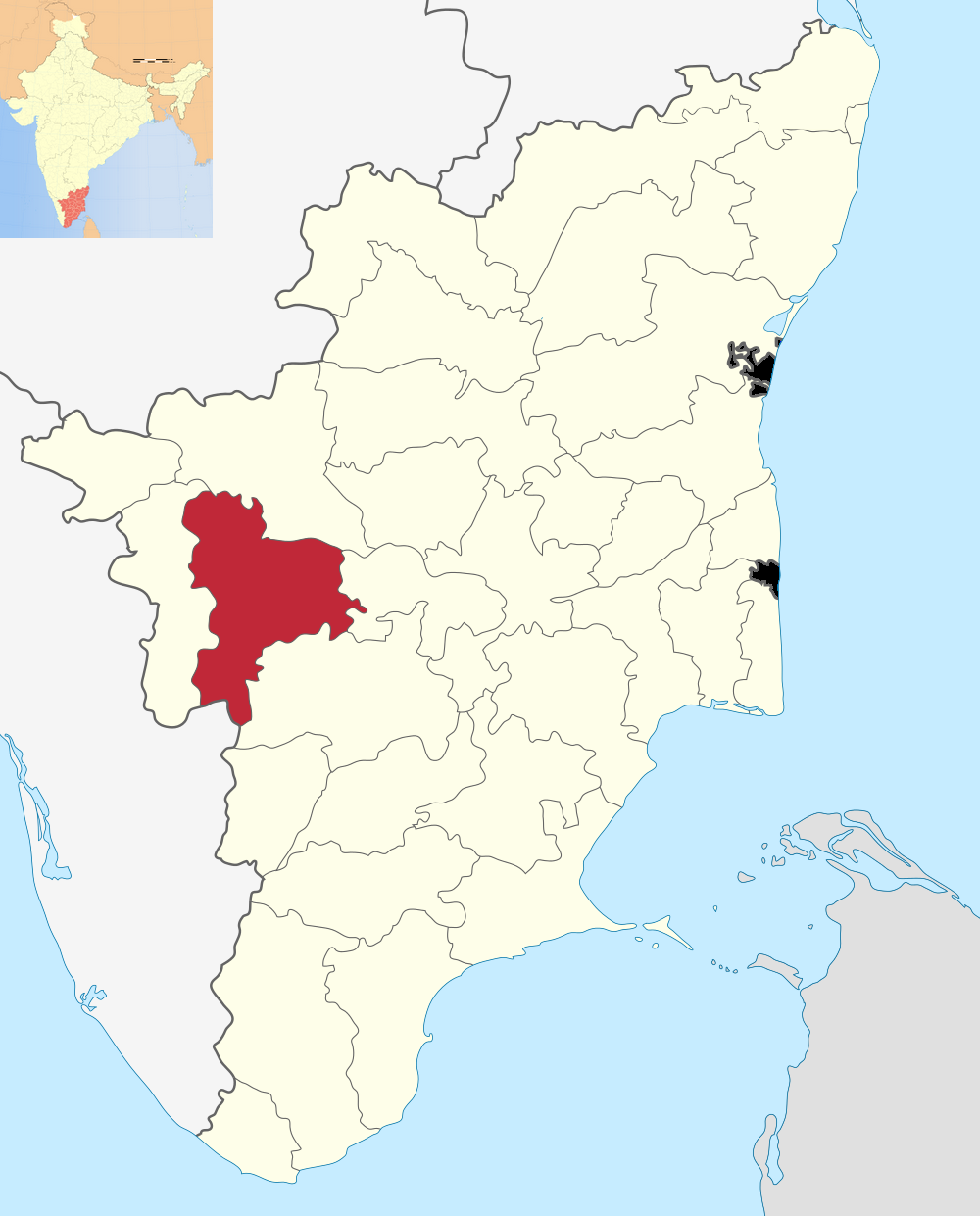
The location of the Tiruppur.

== Demographics ==
Tamil is the main language.

== Politics in Manickapuram ==
KNMK, DMK, ADMK, AIADMK are the major political parties.
