= Anupparpalayam Pudur =

Coordinates: 11.143024°N 77.317631°E

Anupparpalayam Pudur is a small town located within Tirupur Corporation limits. Also called the "metal town of the Kongu region". It is another business zone in Tiruppur district is located 42 km distance to east from Coimbatore city and 7 km north from Tirupur Bus stand. It is a western suburb of Coimbatore. Anupparpralayam is a famous city for furniture and metals. It is the main exporting spot for steel, brass, copper and aluminum utensils for kitchen and hotel needs.
