= State Highway 81 (Tamil Nadu) =

Road in Tamil Nadu, India

State Highway 81

Route information
- Maintained by Highways and Minor Ports Department
- Length: 56.8 km (35.3 mi)

Major junctions
- From: Gobichettipalayam
- To: Kangeyam

Location
- Country: India
- State: Tamil Nadu
- Districts: Erode, Tirupur
- Primary destinations: Kolappalur, Kunnathur, Chengapalli, Uthukuli, Padiyur

Highway system
- Roads in India; Expressways; National; State; Asian; State Highways in Tamil Nadu

Tamil Nadu State Highway 81 (SH-81) is a State Highway maintained by the Highways Department of Government of Tamil Nadu. It connects Gobichettipalayam with Kangeyam in the western part of Tamil Nadu.

== Route ==
The total length of the SH-81 is nearly 90 km. The highway merges with State Highway 172A at 85 km from Gobichettipalayam in between the towns of Uthukuli and Kangeyam in Tirupur district.

Route: Gobichettipalayam – Kunnathur – Uthukuli – Kangeyam – Dharapuram

== Destinations ==
The highway passes through the following places:

- Erode District – Gobichettipalayam
- Tirupur District – Uthukuli, Kangeyam

== Junctions ==
The highway meets the following arterial roads along the way:

- State Highway 15 (Tamil Nadu) at Gobichettipalayam, Erode district
- National Highway 47 at Chengapalli, Tirupur district
- State Highway 172A between Uthukuli and Kangeyam
