= Samalapuram =

- Panchayat town
- Location in Tamil Nadu, India
- Coordinates: 11°05′07″N 77°12′21″E
- Country: India
- State: Tamil Nadu
- District: Tiruppur

Area
  - Total: 21.75 km^{2} (8.40 sq mi)

Population (2011)
  - Total: 20,691
  - Density: 951.3/km^{2} (2,464/sq mi)

Languages
  - Official: Tamil
- Time zone: UTC+5:30 (IST)

Samalapuram is a panchayat town in Palladam taluk of Tiruppur district in the Indian state of Tamil Nadu. It is one of the 15 panchayat towns in the district. Spread across an area of 21.75 km^{2} (8.40 sq mi), it had a population of 20,691 individuals as per the 2011 census.

== Geography and administration ==
Samalapuram is located in Palladam taluk of Tiruppur district in the Indian state of Tamil Nadu. Spread across an area of 21.75 km^{2} (8.40 sq mi), it is located about 16 km (9.9 mi) from the district headquarters Tiruppur. It is one of the 15 panchayat towns in the district. The town panchayat is sub-divided into 15 wards. It is headed by a chairperson, who is elected by the members, who are chosen through direct elections. The town forms part of the Sulur Assembly constituency that elects its member to the Tamil Nadu legislative assembly and the Coimbatore Lok Sabha constituency that elects its member to the Parliament of India.

== Demographics ==
As per the 2011 census, Samalapuram had a population of 20,691 individuals across 5,938 households. The population saw a significant increase compared to the previous census in 2001 when 14,705 inhabitants were registered. The population consisted of 3,547 males and 3,674 females. About 2,153 individuals were below the age of six years. About 15.2% of the population belonged to scheduled castes. The entire population is classified as urban. The town has an average literacy rate of 77.1%.

About 54.1% of the eligible population were employed full-time, of which majority were involved in agriculture and handloom industries. Hinduism was the majority religion which was followed by 91.7% of the population, with Christianity (7.7%) and Islam (0.4%) being minor religions.
