= Sri Venkatesa Perumal Temple =

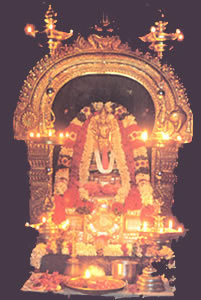

Religion
- Affiliation: Hinduism
- Deity: Sri Venkatesa Perumal

Location
- Location: Tirupur
- State: Tamil Nadu
- Country: India
- Interactive map of Sri Venkatesa Perumal Temple
- Coordinates: 11.294238°N 77.164705°E

Architecture
- Type: Kongunadu Architecture
- Completed: 16th Century

Sri Venkatesa Perumal Temple, known locally as Melathiruppathi, is a Hindu temple in Mondipalayam, Avinashi taluk, in Tiruppur district, Tamil Nadu, India. It is dedicated to Venkatesa Perumal. The temple is located approximately 45 kilometres (28 mi) from the city of Coimbatore.

In 2026, the Madras High Court ruled that a new temple tower (Rajagopuram) could not be constructed at the site without prior approval from the Tamil Nadu Heritage Commission.
