= Komaralingam =

- Panchayat town
- Location in Tamil Nadu, India
- Coordinates: 10.488200°N 77.349060°E
- Country: India
- State: Tamil Nadu
- District: Tiruppur

Area
  - Total: 31.5 km^{2} (12.2 sq mi)

Population (2011)
  - Total: 13,642
  - Density: 433/km^{2} (1,120/sq mi)

Languages
  - Official: Tamil
- Time zone: UTC+5:30 (IST)

Komaralingam is a panchayat town in Madathukulam taluk of Tiruppur district in the Indian state of Tamil Nadu. It is one of the 15 panchayat towns in the district. Spread across an area of 31.5 km^{2} (12.2 sq mi), it had a population of 13,642 individuals as per the 2011 census.

== Geography and administration ==
Komaralingam is located in Madathukulam taluk of Tiruppur district in the Indian state of Tamil Nadu. Spread across an area of 31.5 km^{2} (12.2 sq mi), it is located about 75 km (47 mi) from Tiruppur. It is one of the 15 panchayat towns in the district. The town panchayat is headed by a chairperson, who is elected by the members, who are chosen through direct elections. The town forms part of the Udumalaipettai Assembly constituency that elects its member to the Tamil Nadu legislative assembly and the Pollachi Lok Sabha constituency that elects its member to the Parliament of India.

== Demographics ==
As per the 2011 census, Komaralingam had a population of 13,642 individuals across 3,854 households. The population saw a marginal increase compared to the previous census in 2001 when 11,769 inhabitants were registered. The population consisted of 6,791 males and 6,851 females. About 1,266 individuals were below the age of six years. About 24.8% of the population belonged to scheduled castes and 7.9% belonged to scheduled tribes. The entire population is classified as urban. The town has an average literacy rate of 69.8%. About 56% of the eligible population were employed, of which majority were involved in agriculture and allied activities. Hinduism was the majority religion which was followed by 91% of the population, with Islam (8.4%) and Christianity (0.6%) being minor religions.
