= Sukreesvarar Temple, Kurakkuthali =

Hindu temple in Tiruppur district

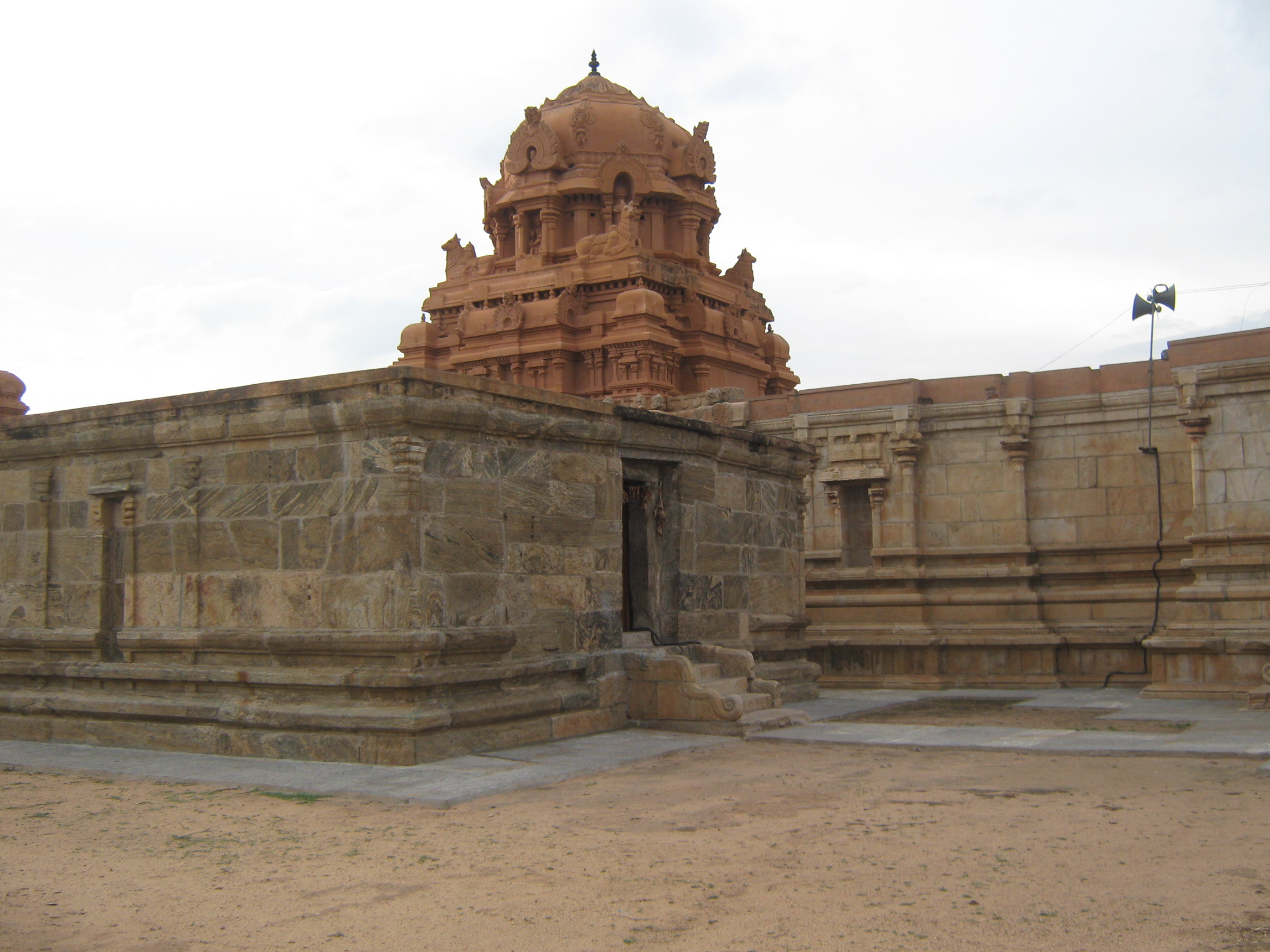
A view of the main vimana of the temple.

Sukreesvarar Temple is a Hindu temple dedicated to the deity Shiva, located at Sarkkar Periyapalayam in Tiruppur district in Tamil Nadu, India.

== Vaippu Sthalam ==
It is one of the shrines of the Vaippu Sthalams sung by Tamil Saivite Nayanar Sundarar.

== Presiding deity ==
The presiding deity is represented by the lingam known as Sukreesvarar. The Goddess is known as Avudainayaki.

== Specialities ==
As Sugriva of Ramayana was worshipped here, this place was known as Kurakkuthali. Sundarar in hymns refers to this place which belonged to Kurumbar Nadu. Inscriptions of Cholas, Pandyas and Udayars are found in this temple. During the time of meeting of Dakshinayana and Uttarayana the rays of the Sun fall on the deity. In inscriptions the deity is known as Aludaya Pillai. He is also known as Milakeesan. This place was called as Mukundapuri and Mukundaipuri.

== Structure ==
On the northern banks of Noyyal River facing east, this temple is situated. The presiding deity is facing east. The Goddess is facing south. On the southern wall of the temple a sculpture of a monkey worshipping lingam is found. In front of the presiding deity two nandhis are found. Of them one is found without two ears. There is a story connected with this temple. When Nandi was going through the field, a farmer cut off its ears. The devotees saw blood coming out of the Nandhi. Due to this one from his family members became dumb. In order to find a remedy to this place the devotees made another Nandhi and put in front of the earlier one which was without ears. When the devotees came, the Nandhis were found in old position. As per the divine voice of the Lord the old Nandhi was kept in front of the deity. Thus the farmer got the remedy.

== Location ==
This temple is located in (Sarkar) Periyapalayam, at a distance of 8 km from Tiruppur in Tiruppur-Uthukuli road.
