= Anikkadavu =

- village
- Location in Tamil Nadu, India Anikkadavu (India)
- Coordinates: 10.7908391°N 77.1790463°E
- Country: India
- State: Tamil Nadu
- District: Tirupur
- Elevation: 0 m (0 ft)

Population (2001)
  - Total: 5,000

Languages
  - Official: Tamil
- Time zone: UTC+5:30 (IST)
- PIN: 642120
- Telephone code: 91-4252
- Vehicle registration: TN41 W, X, Y, Z, TN 42 and TN 78 Z

Anikkadavu is a small village formerly a part of Coimbatore Rural District, India, but now in Tiruppur District which belongs to Udumalpet taluk. The name Anikkadavu derived from the ancient word Anai Kadavu which means that it was the path of elephants used to cross this region long long ago.

== Geography ==
Anikkadavu is located 22 km North to Udumalpet and 26 km North East to Pollachi. Anikkadavu has the third biggest market in that area.

The villages affiliated to Anikkadavu are:

1. Nanjegoundan pudur
2. Anikkadavu
3. Ramachandrapuram
4. Kariyanchalai
5. Sengoda goundenpudhur
6. Sindhilippu
7. Kolipudhur
8. Iluppanagaram

Anikkadavu has several Lord Vinayagar Temples including Karu Kaliyamman Temple, Perumal Temple and Mariyamman Temple.

== Infrastructure ==
Anikkadavu is well connected with other villages via road. Most of the streets of this village are built with concrete roads and tar roads.

Anikkadavu is well connected with GSM & CDMA mobile phone operators.

Anikkadavu has one Primary Health Center Hospital and a maternity ward which contains around 25 beds and serves about 15 villages around Anikkadavu. People even from long distances like Poolavadi and Ammapatti are using Ramachandrapuram PHC hospital.

Many windmills have been installed in the village to produce electricity.

Anikkadavu has one elementary school, high school and one higher secondary school. All are run by the Govt. of Tamil Nadu with the name of Ramachandrapuram Govt Higher Secondary School.

=== Public transportation ===
Anikkadavu has three bus stops:

- Kariyanchalai
- Ramachandrapuram
- Anikkadavu

Buses available from Anikkadavu:

- There are many more buses available from Udumalpet, Pollachi and Dharapuram
- The Highway Udumalpet – Annur via- Senjerimalai connect to Udumalpet town from Sinthiluppu.
- 4B (Route no.from Udumalpet) operated by the Govt of Tamil nadu TNSTC from Udumalpet-Negamam via Anikkadavu for more than 50 years
- 38 A (Route No. from Pollachi), operated by the Govt. of Tamil Nadu (TNSTC) from Pollachi (TNSTC Branch-3) for more than 30 years.
- Shakthi Aandavar (38), formally known as DMT operated by a private company based on Pollachi.
  - These two buses run between Pollachi and Anikkadavu in the alternative hours and help the village people a lot to traverse upward and downward till 10:30 p.m.
- Jayamurugan – connects Anikkadavu to Udumalpet and the popular temple town Palani thrice in a day. People know this bus with its old name of Ajeesh. This is a route bus and the ticket fares are little bit higher than the town buses.
- 23 (Route No. from Udumalpet), operated by Govt. of Tamil Nadu (TNSTC) from Udumalpet for more than 30 years.
- Aswini Bus Service, an ancient bus service previously operated by Meenakshi Transports, Dharapuram. This bus is also called a Siva bus.

This connects Anikkadavu to Pollachi and Dharapuram. Among the buses passing through Anikkadavu, Saraswathi covers a very long distance about 60 km.

- Panapatti, a dual route bus service operated by Govt of Tamil Nadu. This serves the village twice a day and the rest of time it runs between Pollachi and Tiruppur via Seripalayam, Vadasitur, Panapatti and Palladam. (now not operated. this route was cancelled) It has been operated by the Govt. of Tamil Nadu (TNSTC) from Pollachi for more than 30 years.
- The village has no rail connectivity and air. The nearest airport is Coimbatore International Airport (IATA: CJB, ICAO: VOCB) which is located around 52 km away and the nearest railway stations are Pollachi Junction (POY Jn) under Palakkad railway division.

== Government ==
At present Anikkadavu belongs to the Udumalpet Legislative Assembly and from the next state general elections it will be added to Udumalpet. It belongs to the Pollachi Parliamentary Constituency.

The Current elected members:

- MLA – Mr. Udumalai Radhakrishnan (All India Anna Dravida Munnetra Kazhagam)
- MP – Mr. Shanmugasundaram (Dravida Munnetra Kazhagam)

The last elected president was Mr. C. Giri and currently under the special officer administration.

Anikkadavu is a Panchayat headquarters.

Anikkadavu has a Panchayat Office, Electricity Board Office and one post office. The electricity board has an officer at the rank of AE (Assistant Engineer).

Anikkadavu has its own post office. The postal code for Anikkadavu is 642120.
