= Velampoondi =

- Village
- Location in Tamil Nadu, India Velampoondi (India)
- Coordinates: 10.821872°N 77.854802°E
- Country: India
- State: Tamil Nadu
- District: Tiruppur

Velampoondi is a village located in Tiruppur district in the Indian state of Tamil Nadu.
