= Kongampalayam =

Agricultural village in India

- village
- Location in Tamil Nadu, India Kongampalayam (India)
- Coordinates: 11.23°N 77.5°E
- Country: India
- State: Tamil Nadu
- District: Erode

Population (2011)
  - Total: 388

Languages
  - Official: Tamil
- Time zone: UTC+5:30 (IST)
- PIN: 638056
- Vehicle registration: KL-

Kongampalayam is a small agricultural village in the Erode district of Tamil Nadu, India. It has a population of 388, with most of the population having agriculture and clothing as their primary source of income.location code or village code of Kongampalayam village is 635003. Kongampalayam village is located in Perundurai Tehsil of Erode district in Tamil Nadu, India. It is situated 15 km away from sub-district headquarter Perundurai and 35 km away from district headquarter Erode. As per 2009 stats, Varapalayam is the gram panchayat of Kongampalayam village. The Arasannamalai temple is located in this village. It is located nearly 2 kilometer from vijayamangalam railway station (vaipadi) and is nearer to the Tiruppur district.
