= Ponnapuram =

Coordinates: 10.6995°N 77.3913°E

- Village
- Nickname: Ponnapuram
- Interactive map of Ponnapuram
- Country: India
- State: Tamil Nadu
- District: Tirupur district

Languages
  - Official: Tamil
- Time zone: UTC+5:30 (IST)
- PIN: 638657

Ponnapuram is a village in the Dharapuram taluk within the Tirupur district of Tamil Nadu, India. Agriculture is the main occupation along with vegetable exporting and the generation of power using windmills. The village has a population of approximately 1,500, and is located 16 km west of Dharapuram.

== Agriculture ==
Ponnapuram produces a range of vegetables including onion, chillies, maize, cotton, sunflower, and sugarcane and supplies them to its neighboring taluks. The cultivation of these crops is reliant on irrigation from the Aliyar Reservoir which fills following the annual rainy season.

== Education ==
The literacy rate has gone up significantly in recent years. The local school, which previously offered only primary education, later extended its participation to high school level.

== Windmills ==
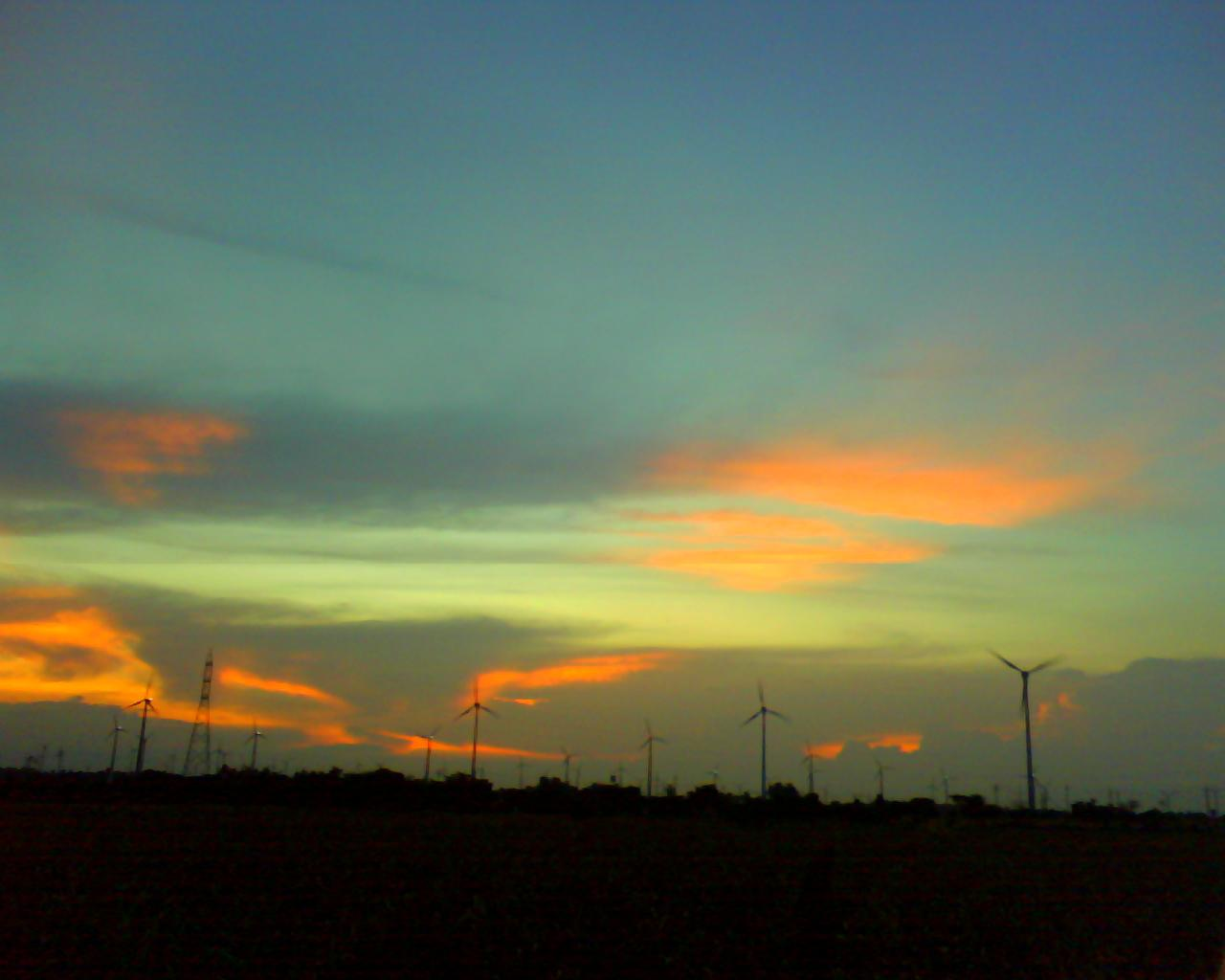
Enchanting evening view of Ponnapuram

The village is renowned for the generation of electricity using windmills. Many of the younger residents find employment in the security and meter-reading fields as side-jobs alongside their primary occupations.

== Festival ==
"Kavadi" is an event celebrated twice every year. Activities include carrying sacred river water from Kodumudi to Murugan and to the Bhagavan temple in Palani. The event also involves heavy rock music using native instruments.
