= Appiayapalayam =

Appiyapalayam
- village
- Location in Tamil Nadu, India Appiyapalayam (India)
- Coordinates: 11.231371°N 77.347886°E
- Country: India
- State: Tamil Nadu
- District: Tiruppur district

Languages
  - Official: Tamil
- Time zone: UTC+5:30 (IST)
- Nearest city: Tiruppur
- Lok Sabha constituency: Tiruppur

Appiyapalayam, is a small village under the Ettiverampalayam panchayat, located 3 km from Perumanallur and 17 km from Tiruppur.

The Sri Maagali Amman temple and Perumal Kovil are at the center of the village. The annual Pongal festival at the Sri Magali Ammam Temple takes place during the Tamil month of Panguni (Mar–Apr). As a traditional Kongu village, majority of peoples are farmers. The main village is surrounded by farm houses called "Thotams". Well irrigation is the water source for the cultivation of major crops which include cotton, bananas, turmeric, groundnuts and cholam. The village gets rain from both the North East and South West Monsoon.

Tirupur attracts people from this village to get associated with the knitwear business. The Nethaji Apparel Park at New Tiruppur is near this village. Government buses travel from Tirupur to Nambiyur passes through this village. The nearest railway station is Tiruppur. Appiyapalayam a has a government primary school and a public health centre.
