= Sankaramanallur =

- Panchayat town
- Location in Tamil Nadu, India
- Coordinates: 10°28′12″N 77°22′10″E
- Country: India
- State: Tamil Nadu
- District: Tiruppur

Area
  - Total: 32 km^{2} (12 sq mi)

Population (2011)
  - Total: 10,283
  - Density: 320/km^{2} (830/sq mi)

Languages
  - Official: Tamil
- Time zone: UTC+5:30 (IST)

Sankaramanallur is a panchayat town in Madathukulam taluk of Tiruppur district in the Indian state of Tamil Nadu. It is one of the 15 panchayat towns in the district. Spread across an area of 32 km^{2} (12 sq mi), it had a population of 10,283 individuals as per the 2011 census.

== Geography and administration ==
Sankaramanallur is located in Madathukulam taluk of Tiruppur district in the Indian state of Tamil Nadu. Spread across an area of 32 km^{2} (12 sq mi), it is one of the 15 panchayat towns in the district. The town panchayat is headed by a chairperson, who is elected by the members, who are chosen through direct elections. The town forms part of the Madathukulam Assembly constituency that elects its member to the Tamil Nadu legislative assembly and the Pollachi Lok Sabha constituency that elects its member to the Parliament of India.

== Demographics ==
As per the 2011 census, Sankaramanallur had a population of 10,283 individuals across 2,004 households. The population saw a marginal increase compared to the previous census in 2001 when 9,543 inhabitants were registered. The population consisted of 5,145 males and 5,138 females. About 886 individuals were below the age of six years. About 24.3% of the population belonged to scheduled castes. The entire population is classified as urban. The town has an average literacy rate of 70.2%.

About 59.8% of the eligible population were employed full-time, of which majority were involved in agriculture and allied activities. Hinduism was the majority religion which was followed by 95.7% of the population, with Christianity (0.4%) and Islam (3.9%) being minor religions.
