= Kaniyur, Tamil Nadu =

Kaniyur
- Panchayat town
- Location in Tamil Nadu, India
- Coordinates: 10.6111°N 77.3804°E
- Country: India
- State: Tamil Nadu
- District: Tiruppur

Area
  - Total: 5 km^{2} (1.9 sq mi)

Population (2011)
  - Total: 6,180
  - Density: 1,200/km^{2} (3,200/sq mi)

Languages
  - Official: Tamil
- Time zone: UTC+5:30 (IST)

Kaniyur is a panchayat town in madathukulam taluk of Tiruppur district in the Indian state of Tamil Nadu. It is one of the 15 panchayat towns in the district. Spread across an area of 5 km^{2} (1.9 sq mi), it had a population of 6,180 individuals as per the 2011 census.

== Geography and administration ==
Kaniyur is located in madathukulam taluk of Tiruppur district in the Indian state of Tamil Nadu. Spread across an area of 5 km^{2} (1.9 sq mi), it is one of the 15 panchayat towns in the district. The town panchayat is headed by a chairperson, who is elected by the members, who are chosen through direct elections. The town forms part of the Udumalaipettai Assembly constituency that elects its member to the Tamil Nadu legislative assembly and the Pollachi Lok Sabha constituency that elects its member to the Parliament of India.

== Demographics ==
As per the 2011 census, Kaniyur had a population of 6,180 individuals across 1,807 households. The population saw a marginal increase compared to the previous census in 2001 when 5,836 inhabitants were registered. The population consisted of 3,008 males and 3,172 females. About 582 individuals were below the age of six years. About 29.2% of the population belonged to scheduled castes. The entire population is classified as urban. The town has an average literacy rate of 86%.

About 42% of the eligible population were employed, of which majority were involved in agriculture and allied activities. Hinduism was the majority religion which was followed by 78.9% of the population, with Islam (20.2%) and Christianity (0.7%) being minor religions.
