= Dhali =

Dhali may refer to:

== Places ==
- Dhalli, Shimla
- Dhali, India
- Dhali, Cyprus
- Dhali, Sindh a town in Sindh, Pakistan

== People ==
- Arabinda Dhali, Indian politician
