= Periyapatti =

- Census town
- Location in Tamil Nadu, India Periyapatti (India)
- Coordinates: 10.75°N 77.27°E
- Country: India
- State: Tamil Nadu
- District: Tiruppur
- Elevation: 309 m (1,014 ft)

Population (2001)
  - Total: 10,333

Languages
  - Official: Tamil
- Time zone: UTC+5:30 (IST)

Periyapatti is a census town in Tiruppur district in the Indian state of Tamil Nadu.

== Geography ==
Periyapatti is located at 10.75°N 77.27°E. It has an average elevation of 309 metres (1013 feet).

== Demographics ==
As of 2001 India census, Periyapatti had a population of 10,333. Males constitute 51% of the population and females 49%. Periyapatti has an average literacy rate of 69%, higher than the national average of 59.5%: male literacy is 76%, and female literacy is 62%. In Periyapatti, 12% of the population is under 6 years of age.
