= Chinnakkampalayam =

- Panchayat town
- Location in Tamil Nadu, India
- Coordinates: 10°40′46″N 77°27′38″E
- Country: India
- State: Tamil Nadu
- District: Tiruppur

Area
  - Total: 32.3 km^{2} (12.5 sq mi)

Population (2011)
  - Total: 11,546
  - Density: 357/km^{2} (926/sq mi)

Languages
  - Official: Tamil
- Time zone: UTC+5:30 (IST)

Chinnakkampalayam is a panchayat town in Dharapuram taluk of Tiruppur district in the Indian state of Tamil Nadu. Located in the western part of the state, it is one of the 15 panchayat towns in the district. Spread across an area of 32.3 km^{2} (12.5 sq mi), it had a population of 11,546 individuals as per the 2011 census.

== Geography and administration ==
Chinnakkampalayam is located in Dharapuram taluk of Tiruppur district in the Indian state of Tamil Nadu. Spread across an area of 32.3 km^{2} (12.5 sq mi), it is one of the 15 panchayat towns in the district. The panchayat incorporates the revenue villages of Chinnakkampalayam, Selampalayam and Kangayampalayam.

The town panchayat is headed by a chairperson, who is elected by the members, who are chosen through direct elections. The town forms part of the Dharapuram Assembly constituency that elects its member to the Tamil Nadu legislative assembly and the Erode Lok Sabha constituency that elects its member to the Parliament of India.

== Demographics ==
As per the 2011 census, Chinnakkampalayam had a population of 11,546 individuals across 3,445 households. The population saw a marginal increase compared to the previous census in 2001 when 7,130 inhabitants were registered. The population consisted of 5,772 males and 5,774 females. About 820 individuals were below the age of six years. About 27.1% of the population belonged to scheduled castes. The entire population is classified as urban. The town has an average literacy rate of 63.4%.

About 65.4% of the eligible population were employed, of which majority were involved in agriculture and allied activities. Hinduism was the majority religion which was followed by 95.9% of the population, with Christianity (2.8%) and Islam (0.5%) being minor religions.
