= Rudravathi =

- Panchayat town
- Location in Tamil Nadu, India
- Coordinates: 10°51′43″N 77°25′35″E
- Country: India
- State: Tamil Nadu
- District: Tiruppur

Area
  - Total: 30 km^{2} (12 sq mi)

Population (2011)
  - Total: 6,807
  - Density: 230/km^{2} (590/sq mi)

Languages
  - Official: Tamil
- Time zone: UTC+5:30 (IST)

Rudravathi is a panchayat town in Dharapuram taluk of Tiruppur district in the Indian state of Tamil Nadu. It is one of the 15 panchayat towns in the district. Spread across an area of 30 km^{2} (12 sq mi), it had a population of 6,807 individuals as per the 2011 census.

== Geography and administration ==
Rudravathi is located in Dharapuram taluk of Tiruppur district in the Indian state of Tamil Nadu. Spread across an area of 30 km^{2} (12 sq mi), it is one of the 15 panchayat towns in the district. The town panchayat is headed by a chairperson, who is elected by the members, who are chosen through direct elections. The town forms part of the Dharapuram Assembly constituency that elects its member to the Tamil Nadu legislative assembly and the Erode Lok Sabha constituency that elects its member to the Parliament of India.

== Demographics ==
As per the 2011 census, Rudravathi had a population of 6,807 individuals across 2,147 households. The population saw a marginal increase compared to the previous census in 2001 when 6,701 inhabitants were registered. The population consisted of 3,440 males and 3,367 females. About 463 individuals were below the age of six years. About 27.3% of the population belonged to scheduled castes. The entire population is classified as urban. The town has an average literacy rate of 69.2%. About 59.1% of the eligible population were employed, of which majority were involved in agriculture and allied activities. Hinduism was the majority religion which was followed by 98.6% of the population, with Christianity (1%) and Islam (0.2%) being minor religions.
