= Andiagoundanoor =

Coordinates: 10.531083°N 77.266996°E

Andiagoundanoor is a village panchayat and one of the largest geographical areas in Tirupur district, Udumalpet taluk, Tamil Nadu, India. The village panchayat office is situated in Uralpatty. The panchayat comprises the following villages:

- Uralpatty
- Jakkampalayam
- Andiagoundanoor
- Amaravathy
