= Kunnathur, Tirupur =

Kunnathur
- Panchayat town
- Location in Tamil Nadu, India
- Coordinates: 11°28′25″N 77°23′19″E
- Country: India
- State: Tamil Nadu
- District: Tiruppur

Area
  - Total: 7.12 km^{2} (2.75 sq mi)

Population (2011)
  - Total: 8,774
  - Density: 1,230/km^{2} (3,190/sq mi)

Languages
  - Official: Tamil
- Time zone: UTC+5:30 (IST)

Kunnathur is a panchayat town in Uthukuli taluk of Tiruppur district in the Indian state of Tamil Nadu. It is one of the 15 panchayat towns in the district. Spread across an area of 7.12 km^{2} (2.75 sq mi), it had a population of 8,774 individuals as per the 2011 census.

== Geography and administration ==
Kunnathur is located in Uthukuli taluk of Tiruppur district in the Indian state of Tamil Nadu. Spread across an area of 7.12 km^{2} (2.75 sq mi), it is one of the 15 panchayat towns in the district. The town panchayat is headed by a chairperson, who is elected by the members elected from each of the 15 wards. The members themselves are chosen through direct elections. The town forms part of the Perundurai Assembly constituency that elects its member to the Tamil Nadu legislative assembly and the Tiruppur Lok Sabha constituency that elects its member to the Parliament of India.

== Demographics ==
As per the 2011 census, Kunnathur had a population of 8,774 individuals across 2,588 households. The population saw a marginal increase compared to the previous census in 2001 when 7,032 inhabitants were registered. The population consisted of 4,342 males and 4,432 females. About 816 individuals were below the age of six years. About 11% of the population belonged to scheduled castes. The entire population is classified as urban. The town has an average literacy rate of 83.5%.

About 39.8% of the eligible population were employed full-time, of which majority were involved in agriculture and allied activities. The local economy is dependent on agriculture including jaggery production, and borewelling. Hinduism was the majority religion which was followed by 95.8% of the population, with Christianity (2.0%) and Islam (1.6%) being minor religions.
