= Dhali, India =

Dhali Thali
- Panchayat town
- Location in Tamil Nadu, India
- Coordinates: 10.5°N 77.17°E
- Country: India
- State: Tamil Nadu
- District: Tiruppur

Area
  - Total: 32 km^{2} (12 sq mi)

Population (2011)
  - Total: 5,874
  - Density: 180/km^{2} (480/sq mi)

Languages
  - Official: Tamil
- Time zone: UTC+5:30 (IST)

Dhali is a panchayat town in Udumalaipettai taluk of Tiruppur district in the Indian state of Tamil Nadu. It is one of the 15 panchayat towns in the district. Spread across an area of 32 km^{2} (12 sq mi), it had a population of 5,874 individuals as per the 2011 census.

== Geography and administration ==
Dhali is located in Udumalaipettai taluk of Tiruppur district in the Indian state of Tamil Nadu. Spread across an area of 32 km^{2} (12 sq mi), it is one of the 15 panchayat towns in the district. The town panchayat is headed by a chairperson, who is elected by the members, who are chosen through direct elections. The town forms part of the Udumalaipettai Assembly constituency that elects its member to the Tamil Nadu legislative assembly and the Pollachi Lok Sabha constituency that elects its member to the Parliament of India.

== Demographics ==
As per the 2011 census, Dhali had a population of 5,874 individuals across 1,768 households. The population saw a marginal decrease compared to the previous census in 2001 when 6,143 inhabitants were registered. The population consisted of 2,920 males and 2,954 females. About 431 individuals were below the age of six years. About 14.4% of the population belonged to scheduled castes. The entire population is classified as urban. The town has an average literacy rate of 73.5%.

About 51.7% of the eligible population were employed, of which majority were involved in agriculture and allied activities. Hinduism was the majority religion which was followed by 96.7% of the population, with Christianity (2.1%) and Islam (1.1%) being minor religions.
