= Kolathupalayam =

- Panchayat town
- Location in Tamil Nadu, India
- Coordinates: 10.7615783°N 77.584151°E
- Country: India
- State: Tamil Nadu
- District: Tiruppur

Area
  - Total: 37 km^{2} (14 sq mi)

Population (2011)
  - Total: 17,819
  - Density: 480/km^{2} (1,200/sq mi)

Languages
  - Official: Tamil
- Time zone: UTC+5:30 (IST)

Kolathupalayam is a panchayat town in Dharapuram taluk of Tiruppur district in the Indian state of Tamil Nadu. It is one of the 15 panchayat towns in the district. Spread across an area of 37 km^{2} (14 sq mi), it had a population of 17,819 individuals as per the 2011 census.

== Geography and administration ==
Kolathupalayam is located in Dharapuram taluk of Tiruppur district in the Indian state of Tamil Nadu. Spread across an area of 37 km^{2} (14 sq mi), it is one of the 15 panchayat towns in the district. It is located about 10 km (6.2 mi) from Dharapuram, on the banks of the Amaravathi River. The town panchayat is headed by a chairperson, who is elected by the members representing each of the 18 wards of the panchayat. The members themselves are chosen through direct elections. The town forms part of the Dharapuram Assembly constituency that elects its member to the Tamil Nadu legislative assembly and the Erode Lok Sabha constituency that elects its member to the Parliament of India.

== Demographics ==
As per the 2011 census, Kolathupalayam had a population of 17,819 individuals across 5,457 households. The population saw a marginal increase compared to the previous census in 2001 when 17,438 inhabitants were registered. The population consisted of 8,770 males and 9,049 females. About 1,392 individuals were below the age of six years. About 28.9% of the population belonged to scheduled castes. The entire population is classified as urban. The town has an average literacy rate of 70.8%.

About 49.3% of the eligible population were employed, of which majority were involved in agriculture and allied activities. Hinduism was the majority religion which was followed by 87.1% of the population, with Islam (12%) and Christianity (0.8%) being minor religions.
