= Madathukulam block =

Madathukulam block is a revenue block in the Tiruppur district of Tamil Nadu, India. It has a total of 11 panchayat villages.
