= Avanashi block =

Coordinates: 11°11′43″N 77°16′7″E

Avanashi block is a revenue block in the Tiruppur district of Tamil Nadu, India. It has a total of 31 panchayat villages.
