= Anuppatti =

- Village
- Country: India
- State: Tamil Nadu
- Region: Kongu Nadu
- District: Tirupur
- Metropolitan: Coimbatore
- Established

Government
  - Type: Village

Population (2011)
  - Total: 9,221
- Time zone: UTC+5:30 (IST)
- Postal code: 641658
- Telephone code: +91-04255
- Vehicle registration: TN-39

Anuppattii Gram Panchayat is a panchayat, which is located in Kamanaicken Palayam Taluk in Tiruppur district in the southern part of Tamil Nadu. The panchayat falls under the Palladam Assembly constituency and the Coimbatore Lok Sabha constituency. The panchayat has a total of 7 panchayat constituencies. Out of these, 7 panchayat members are elected. According to the 2011 Census of India, the total population is 9,221. Of these, 4475 are females and 4746 are males.
