= Udumalaipettai division =

Coordinates: 10.58°N 77.24°E

Udumalaipettai division is a revenue division in the Tiruppur district of Tamil Nadu, India.It is the smallest division in Tiruppur district by population. According to the 2011 census the estimated population of Udumalpet Division was 4,21,567. The estimated area of Udumalpet taluk and Madathukkulam taluk was 1,672 km^{2}.
