= Velampalayam =

Coordinates: 11°08′43″N 77°18′14″E

Velampalayam 15 velampalayam
- Town
- Interactive map of Velampalayam
- Country: India
- State: Tamil Nadu
- District: Tirupur

Population (2011)
  - Total: 87,427

Languages
  - Official: Tamil
- Time zone: UTC+5:30 (IST)

Velampalayam was a third grade municipality in Tiruppur district in the Indian state of Tamil Nadu. As of 2011, the town had a population of 87,427.

== Demographics ==
Religious census
Religion	Percent(%)
Hindu	92.36%
Muslim	3.27%
Christian	4.21%
Sikh	0.02%
Buddhist	0.01%
Other	0.12%

According to 2011 census, Velampalayam had a population of 87,427 with a sex-ratio of 971 females for every 1,000 males, much above the national average of 929. A total of 10,272 were under the age of six, constituting 5,259 males and 5,013 females. Scheduled Castes and Scheduled Tribes accounted for 6.01% and .16% of the population respectively. The average literacy of the town was 78.02%, compared to the national average of 72.99%. The town had a total of 24381 households. There were a total of 40,043 workers, comprising 156 cultivators, 290 main agricultural labourers, 712 in house hold industries, 37,261 other workers, 1,624 marginal workers, 25 marginal cultivators, 39 marginal agricultural labourers, 104 marginal workers in household industries and 1,456 other marginal workers.

As per the religious census of 2011, Velampalayam had 92.36% Hindus, 3.27% Muslims, 4.21% Christians, 0.02% Sikhs, 0.01% Buddhists, 0.% Jains and 0.12% following other religions.
