= Dharapuram block =

Revenue block in Tamil Nadu, India

Coordinates: 10.73°N 77.52°E

Dharapuram block is a revenue block in the Tiruppur district of Tamil Nadu, India. It is one among 16 revenue blocks in Tiruppur district. It has a total of 16 panchayat villages. The block had population of 70,372 as of 2011 Census of India.

== See also ==
- Dharapuram division
- Dharapuram taluk
- Dharapuram state assembly constituency
