= Kannivadi, Tiruppur =

Kannivadi
- Panchayat town
- Location in Tamil Nadu, India
- Coordinates: 10°49′59″N 77°46′28″E
- Country: India
- State: Tamil Nadu
- District: Tiruppur

Area
  - Total: 24.65 km^{2} (9.52 sq mi)

Population (2011)
  - Total: 4,385
  - Density: 177.9/km^{2} (460.7/sq mi)

Languages
  - Official: Tamil
- Time zone: UTC+5:30 (IST)

Kannivadi is a panchayat town in Dharapuram taluk of Tiruppur district in the Indian state of Tamil Nadu. It is one of the 15 panchayat towns in the district. Spread across an area of 24.65 km^{2} (9.52 sq mi), it had a population of 4,385 individuals as per the 2011 census.

== Geography and administration ==
Kannivadi is located in Dharapuram taluk of Tiruppur district in the Indian state of Tamil Nadu. Spread across an area of 24.65 km^{2} (9.52 sq mi), it is one of the 15 panchayat towns in the district. The region has a tropical climate with hot summers and mild winters. The highest temperatures are recorded in April and May, with lowest recordings in December-January. The town panchayat is headed by a chairperson, who is elected by the members representing each of the 12 wards in the panchayat. The members themselves are chosen through direct elections. The town forms part of the Dharapuram Assembly constituency that elects its member to the Tamil Nadu legislative assembly and the Erode Lok Sabha constituency that elects its member to the Parliament of India.

== Demographics ==
As per the 2011 census, Kannivadi had a population of 4,385 individuals across 1,352 households. The population saw a marginal decrease compared to the previous census in 2001 when 4,412 inhabitants were registered. The population consisted of 2,138 males and 2,247 females. About 272 individuals were below the age of six years. About 19% of the population belonged to scheduled castes. The entire population is classified as urban. The town has an average literacy rate of 68.1%.

About 59.2% of the eligible population were employed, of which majority were involved in agriculture and allied activities. Hinduism was the majority religion which was followed by 99.1% of the population, with Christianity (0.8%) being a minor religion.
