= Uthukuli block =

Coordinates: 11°17′34″N 77°45′1″E

Uthukuli block is a revenue block in the Tiruppur district of Tamil Nadu, India. It has a total of 37 panchayat villages.
