= Puthur, Tiruchirappalli =

Puthur (also spelt as Pootoor in early records) is a part of the city of Tiruchirappalli in Tamil Nadu, India.

The Bishop Heber College and the headquarters of the Tiruchi Co-Operative Bank are located here. The famous goddess Kulumaye amman goat blood sacrifice festival is celebrated in this town during Maasi (a Tamil month, corresponding to March).
