= Madathukulam =

- Panchayat town
- Location in Tamil Nadu, India
- Coordinates: 10.5667°N 77.35°E
- Country: India
- State: Tamil Nadu
- District: Tiruppur

Area
  - Total: 9.19 km^{2} (3.55 sq mi)

Population (2011)
  - Total: 20,620
  - Density: 2,240/km^{2} (5,810/sq mi)

Languages
  - Official: Tamil
- Time zone: UTC+5:30 (IST)

Madathukulam is a panchayat town in Madathukulam taluk of Tiruppur district in the Indian state of Tamil Nadu. It is one of the 15 panchayat towns in the district. Spread across an area of 9.19 km^{2} (3.55 sq mi), it had a population of 20,620 individuals as per the 2011 census.

== Geography and administration ==
Madathukulam is located in Tiruppur district in the Indian state of Tamil Nadu. It is the administrative headquarters of the Madathukulam taluk. Spread across an area of 9.19 km^{2} (3.55 sq mi), it is one of the 15 panchayat towns in the district. The town panchayat is headed by a chairperson, who is elected by 18 members, who represent the individual wards and are chosen through direct elections. The town forms part of the Madathukulam Assembly constituency that elects its member to the Tamil Nadu legislative assembly and the Pollachi Lok Sabha constituency that elects its member to the Parliament of India.

== Demographics ==
As per the 2011 census, Madathukulam had a population of 20,620 individuals across 5,761 households. The population saw a marginal increase compared to the previous census in 2001 when 20,352 inhabitants were registered. The population consisted of 10,198 males and 10,422 females. About 1,714 individuals were below the age of six years. About 20.8% of the population belonged to scheduled castes. The entire population is classified as urban. The town has an average literacy rate of 81.3%.

About 41.7% of the eligible population were employed, of which majority were involved in agriculture and allied activities. Hinduism was the majority religion which was followed by 90.9% of the population, with Christianity (2.5%) and Islam (6.6%) being minor religions.
