= Vellakoil block =

Coordinates: 10.93°N 77.72°E

Vellakoil block is a revenue block in the Tiruppur district of Tamil Nadu, India. It has a total of 12 panchayat villages.As per estimation the block has the total population of approximately 133,105 including Vellakovil Municipality (The population of Vellakovil Municipality is 55,025 per 2023 estimation) and Muthur Town panchayat.

Vellakovil Block has totally 12 Revenue Villages and 1 Town panchayat and 1 Municipality

Municipalities 1.Vellakovil

Town panchayats 1.Muthur

Revenue Villages

1.Lakkamanaikenpatti 2.Mandhapuram 3.Semmandampalayam 4.Senathipalayam 5.Velappanaikan valasu 6.Valliyarachal 7.Mettupalayam 8.Kambaliyampatti 9.Pudhuppai 10.Pachappalayam 11.Veerasozhapuram 12.Dasavanaikenpatti
