= Udumalaipettai block =

Udumalaipettai block is a revenue block in the Tiruppur district of Tamil Nadu, India. It has a total of 38 panchayat villages.
