= Kangeyam block =

Kangeyam block is a revenue block in the Tiruppur district of Tamil Nadu, India. It has a total of 15 panchayat villages. As on 2011 the total population of block was 58,477. The Headquarters of Kangeyam Community development block office is in Kangeyam town.
