= Gudimangalam block =

Gudimangalam block is a revenue block in the Tiruppur district of Tamil Nadu, India. It has a total of 23 panchayat villages and it is famous for wind energy production.
