= Avinashi taluk =

Coordinates: 11°11′43″N 77°16′7″E

Avinashi taluk is a taluk of Tirupur district of the Indian state of Tamil Nadu. The headquarters of the taluk is the town of Avinashi.

== Demographics ==
According to the 2011 census, the taluk of Avinashi had a population of 337923 with 168055 males and 169868 females. There were 1011 women for every 1000 men. The taluk had a literacy rate of 68.05. Child population in the age group below 6 was 15424 Males and 14709 Females.
