= Mulanur block =

Mulanur block is a revenue block in the dharapuram taluk of Tiruppur district of Tamil Nadu, India. It has a total of 12 panchayat villages.
