= Tiruppur block =

Tiruppur block is a revenue block in the Tiruppur district of Tamil Nadu, India. It has a total of 21 panchayat villages.
