= Udumalaipettai taluk =

Coordinates: 10.58°N 77.24°E

Udumalaipettai taluk is a taluk of Tirupur district of the Indian state of Tamil Nadu. The headquarters is the town of Udumalpet..

== Demographics ==
According to the 2011 census, the taluk of Udumalaipettai had a population of 237,633 with 1,18,014 males and 1,19,619 females. There were 1014 women for every 1000 men. The taluk had a literacy rate of 73.45. Child population in the age group below 6 was 8,954 Males and 8,377 Females.

== See also ==
- Anikkadavu
