= Palladam taluk =

Coordinates: 10.98°N 77.3°E

Palladam taluk is a taluk of Tirupur district of the Indian state of Tamil Nadu. The headquarters of the taluk is the town of Palladam.

== Demographics ==
According to the 2011 census, the taluk of Palladam had a population of 245,428 with 123,506 males and 121,922 females. There were 987 women for every 1000 men. The taluk had a literacy rate of 70.01. Child population in the age group below 6 was 11,908 Males and 11,494 Females.
