= Bishop Heber College =

Educational Institution, Thirichirapalli, Tamilnadu, India

Coordinates: 10.8188°N 78.6754°E

Bishop Heber College is a religious minority educational institution in Tiruchirappalli, Tamil Nadu, India. It was founded in 1966, although the school has historical roots extending through various earlier local religious schools to about the mid-nineteenth century. Bishop Heber College offers several undergraduate and postgraduate degrees including the doctorate level.

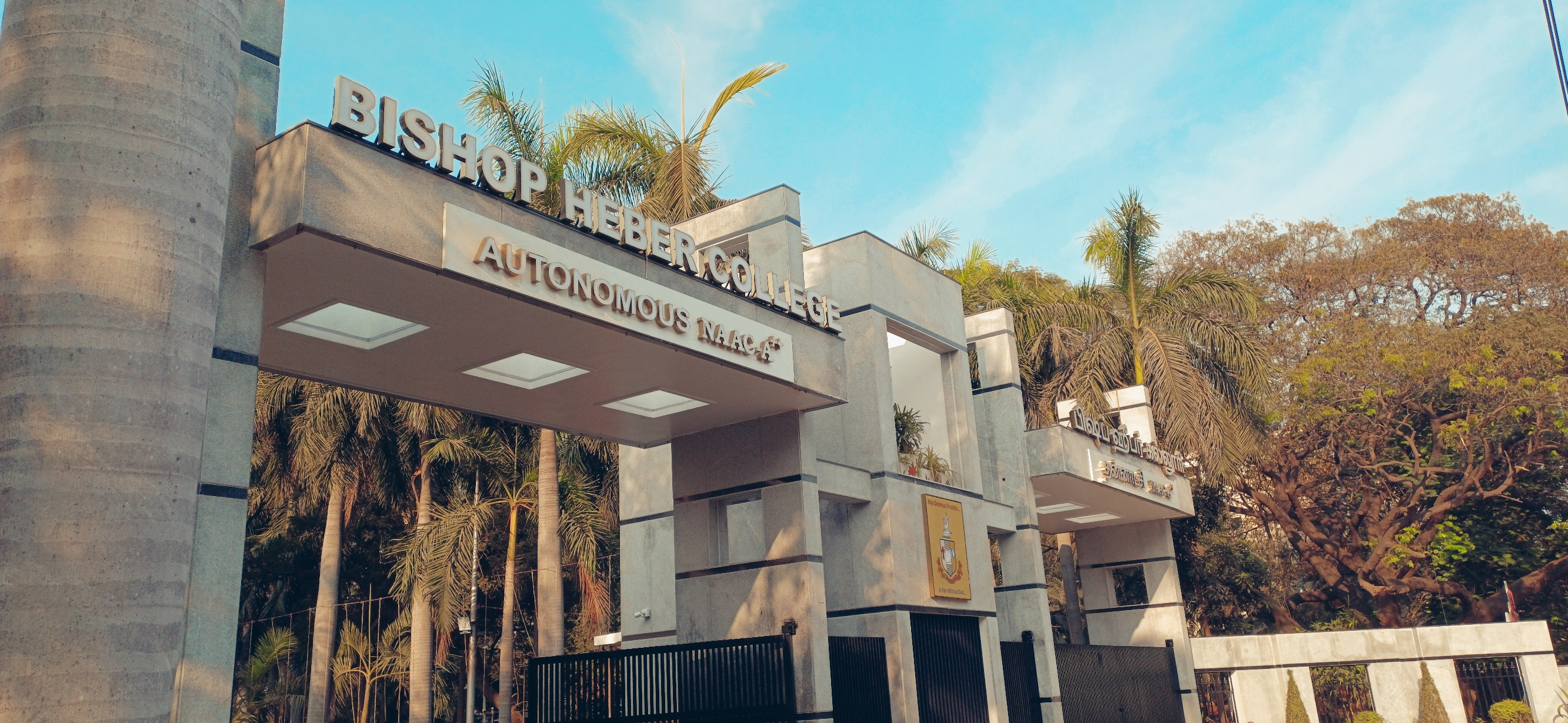
Main Entrance of the College since the year 2024

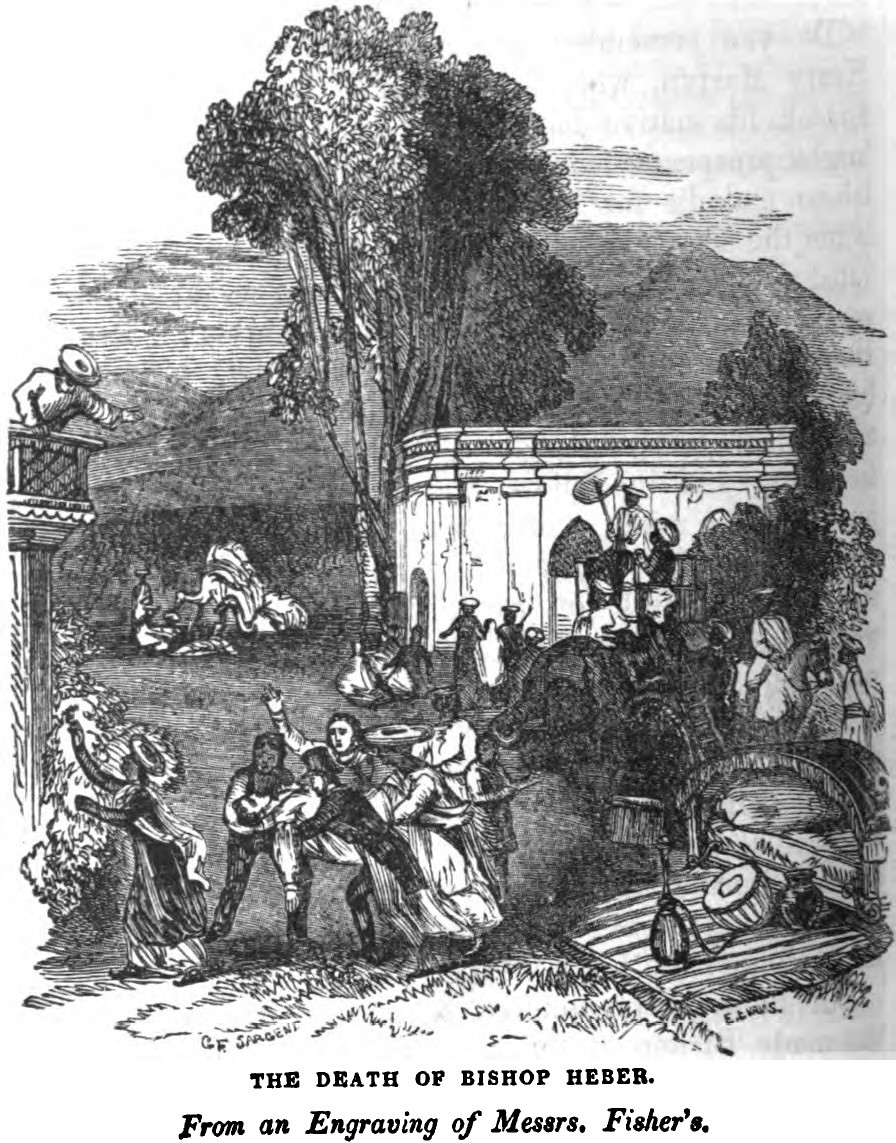
The Death of Bishop Heber (From an Engraving of Messers. Fisher's) (1848, p. 50)

== Rankings ==
College rankings

General – India
- NIRF (Colleges) (2022): 43

It was ranked 33rd among colleges in India by the National Institutional Ranking Framework (NIRF) in 2024. In the 2025 NIRF rankings, it was placed 46th among colleges.

== Notable alumni ==
A. R. Murugadoss – Film director

James Vasanthan – Music director

Anbil Mahesh Poyyamozhi - Tamilnadu School Education Department Minister

Joshua Kirubairaj - General Secretary, Scripture Union, Chennai.

Ganesan Santhanam – Deputy Editor/Chief of Bureau, The Hindu

Vietnam – Translator and Under Secretary, Rajya Sabha, Indian Parliament, Delhi
