= Semmipalayam =

- Town
- Location in Tamil Nadu, India
- Coordinates: 11°00′35″N 77°14′03″E
- Country: India
- State: Tamil Nadu
- District: Tirupur
- Metro: Coimbatore

Population (2001)
  - Total: 6,188

Languages
  - Official: Tamil
- Time zone: UTC+5:30 (IST)
- PIN: 641662
- Telephone code: +91-4255
- Vehicle registration: TN 39

Semmipalayam is a census town in Tirupur district in the Indian state of Tamil Nadu.

== Demographics ==
As of 2001 India census, Semmipalayam had a population of 6188. Males constitute 53% of the population and females 47%. Semmipalayam has an average literacy rate of 69%, higher than the national average of 59.5%: male literacy is 77%, and female literacy is 60%. In Semmipalayam, 10% of the population is under 6 years of age.
