= Kundadam block =

Kundadam block is a revenue block in Dharapuram taluk of the Tiruppur district of Tamil Nadu, India. It has a total of 24 panchayat villages.

== Village Panchayats in Kundadam Block ==
- Aratholuvu
- Bellampatti
- Ellappalayampudur
- Gethelrev
- Jothiyampatti
- Kannankovil
- Kokkampalayam
- Kolumanguli
- Kurukkapalayam
- Maruthur
- Molarapatti
- Muthiyampatti
- Nandavanampalayam
- Navanari
- Periakumarapalayam
- Perumalpalayam
- Punganthurai
- Sadayapalayam
- Sankarandampalayam
- Sengodampalayam
- Sirukinar
- Suriyanallur
- Vadachinnaripalayam
- Velayuthampalayam
