= Uthukuli =

- Panchayat town
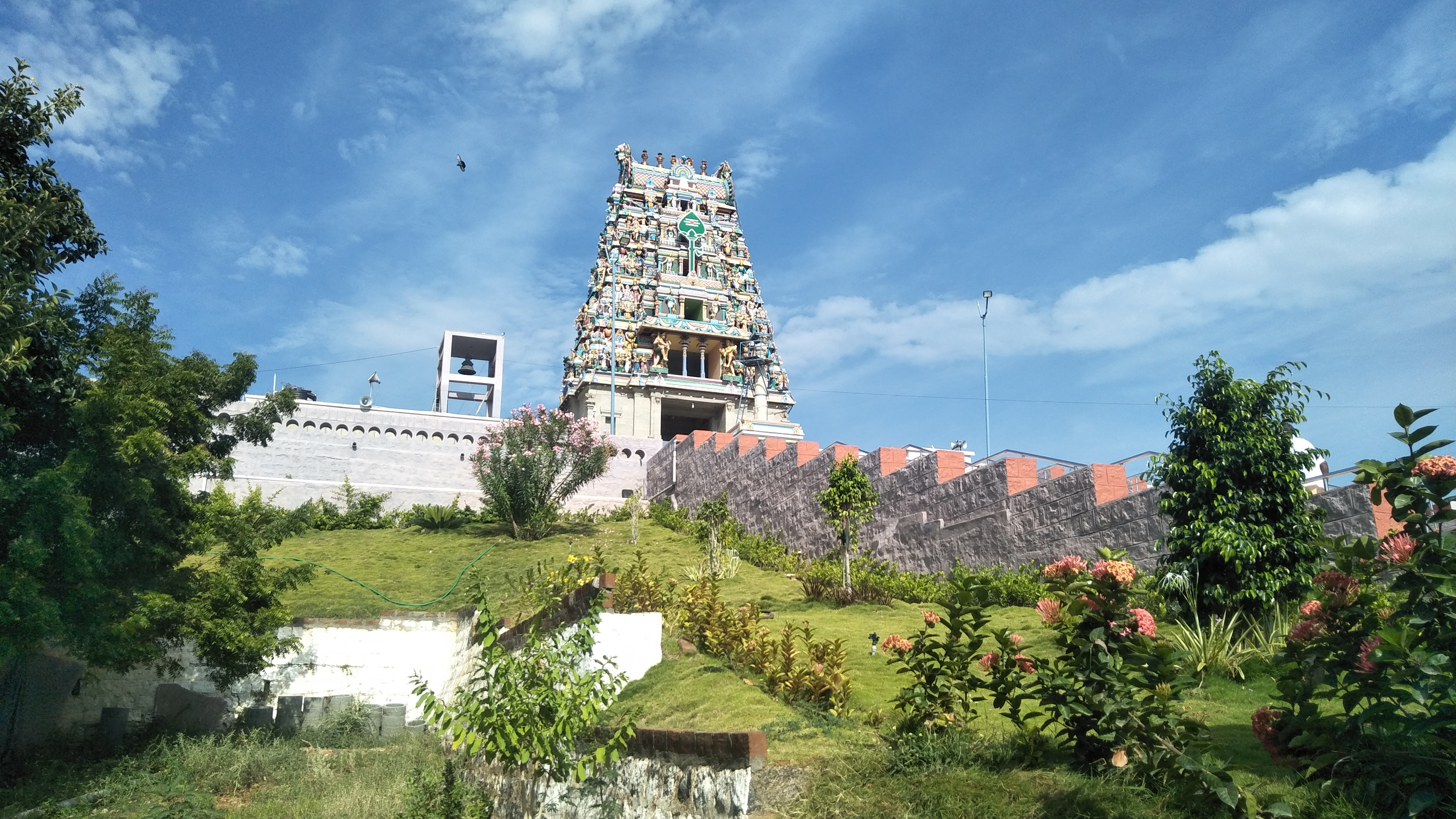
- Uthukuli Murugan temple

- Location in Tamil Nadu, India
- Coordinates: 11°17′34″N 77°45′1″E
- Country: India
- State: Tamil Nadu
- District: Tiruppur

Area
  - Total: 5.7 km^{2} (2.2 sq mi)

Population (2011)
  - Total: 10,130
  - Density: 1,800/km^{2} (4,600/sq mi)

Languages
  - Official: Tamil
- Time zone: UTC+5:30 (IST)

Uthukuli is a panchayat town in Tiruppur district in the Indian state of Tamil Nadu. It is one of the 15 panchayat towns in the district, and the administrative headquarters of Uthukuli taluk. Spread across an area of 5.7 km^{2} (2.2 sq mi), it had a population of 10,130 individuals as per the 2011 census. The region is known for its dairy and butter industry.

== Etymology ==
As per Hindu mythology, Agastya arrived at the Kaithamalai hillock in the region to meditate. He couldn't find any water there and prayed to Murugan for help. Murugan appeared and created a source of water, which came to be known as Utrukuli, and later became Uthukuli.

== Geography and administration ==
Uthukuli is located in Tiruppur district in the Indian state of Tamil Nadu. It is the administrative headquarters of Uthukuli taluk. Spread across an area of 5.7 km^{2} (2.2 sq mi), it borders the neighbouring Erode district. It is one of the 15 panchayat towns in the district. The town panchayat is sub-divided into 15 wards, and is headed by a chairperson. The chairperson is elected by the members, who are chosen through direct elections. The town forms part of the Perundurai Assembly constituency that elects its member to the Tamil Nadu legislative assembly and the Tiruppur Lok Sabha constituency that elects its member to the Parliament of India.

== Demographics ==
As per the 2011 census, Uthukuli had a population of 10,130 individuals across 3,000 households. The population saw a marginal increase compared to the previous census in 2001 when 8,294 inhabitants were registered. The population consisted of 5,027 males and 5,103 females. About 979 individuals were below the age of six years. About 9% of the population belonged to scheduled castes. The entire population is classified as urban. The town has an average literacy rate of 83.4%.

About 47.2% of the eligible population were employed, of which majority were involved in agriculture and allied activities. The region is known for its dairy and butter industry. Hinduism was the majority religion which was followed by 89.3% of the population, with Christianity (1.5%) and Islam (8.9%) being minor religions.
