= Madathukulam taluk =

10.559584°N 77.365461°E Madathukulam taluk is a taluk of Tirupur district of the Indian state of Tamil Nadu. The headquarters of the taluk is the town of Madathukulam

== Demographics ==
According to the 2011 census, the taluk of Madathukulam had a population of 178,271 with 88,710 males and 89,561 females. There were 1010 women for every 1000 men. The taluk had a literacy rate of 67.34. Child population in the age group below 6 was 6,805 Males and 6,412 Females.
