= Dharapuram taluk =

Administrative division in Tiruppur district, Tamil Nadu

Dharapuram taluk is a taluk in Tirupur district of the Indian state of Tamil Nadu. The headquarters is the town of Dharapuram. Dharapuram taluk previously included what is now Kangeyam taluk.

== Demographics ==
According to the 2011 census, the taluk of Dharapuram had a population of 282,889 with 140,874 males and 142,015 females. There were 1008 women for every 1000 men. The taluk had a literacy rate of 67.11. Child population in the age group below 6 was 10,215 Males and 9,510 Females.

== Panchayat Unions ==
Panchayat Union Blocks Comes Under Dharapuram Taluk are:

- Dharapuram block
- Mulanur block
- Kundadam block (also part of Kangeyam taluk)
