= Tiruppur =

- City
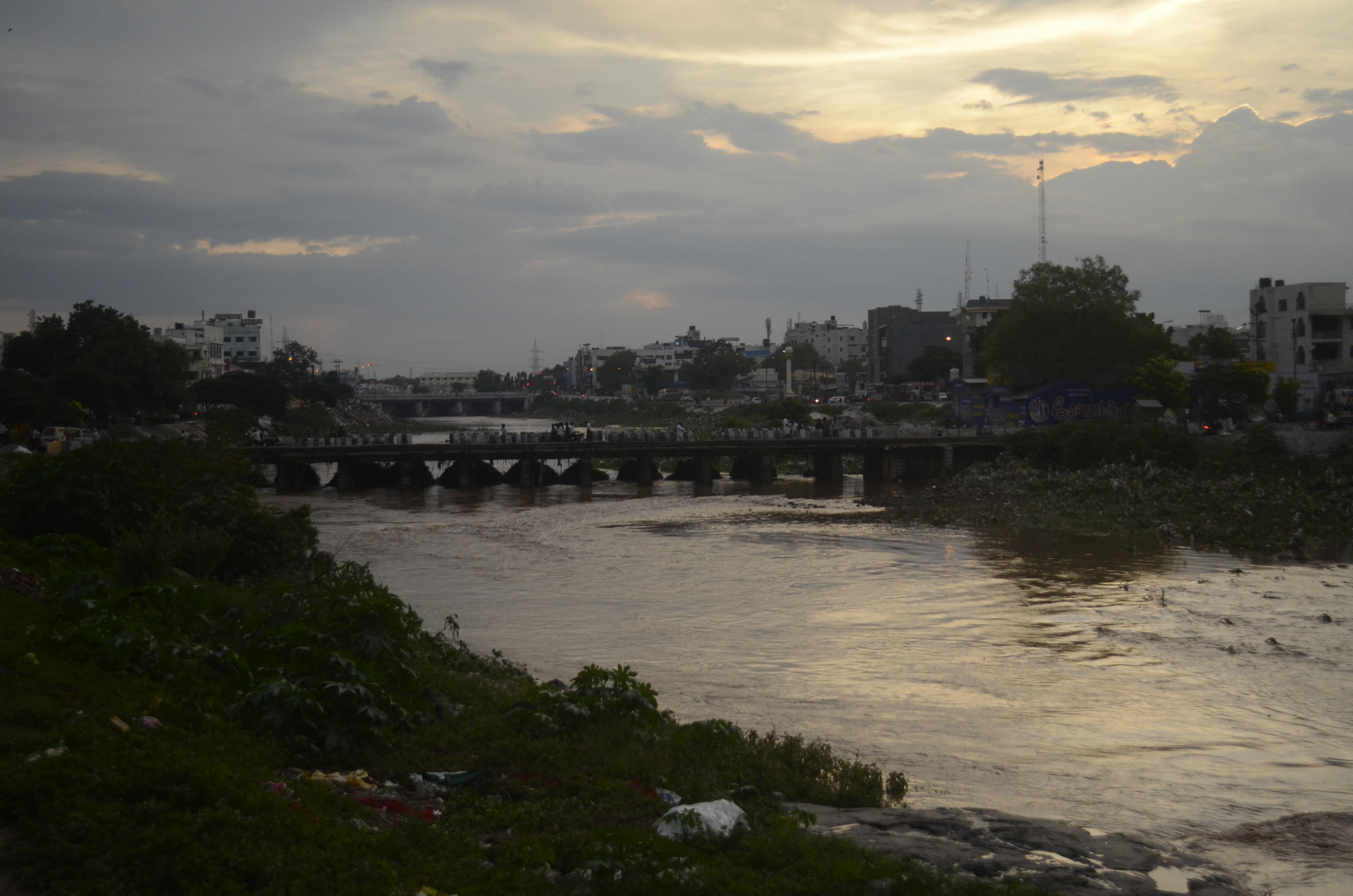
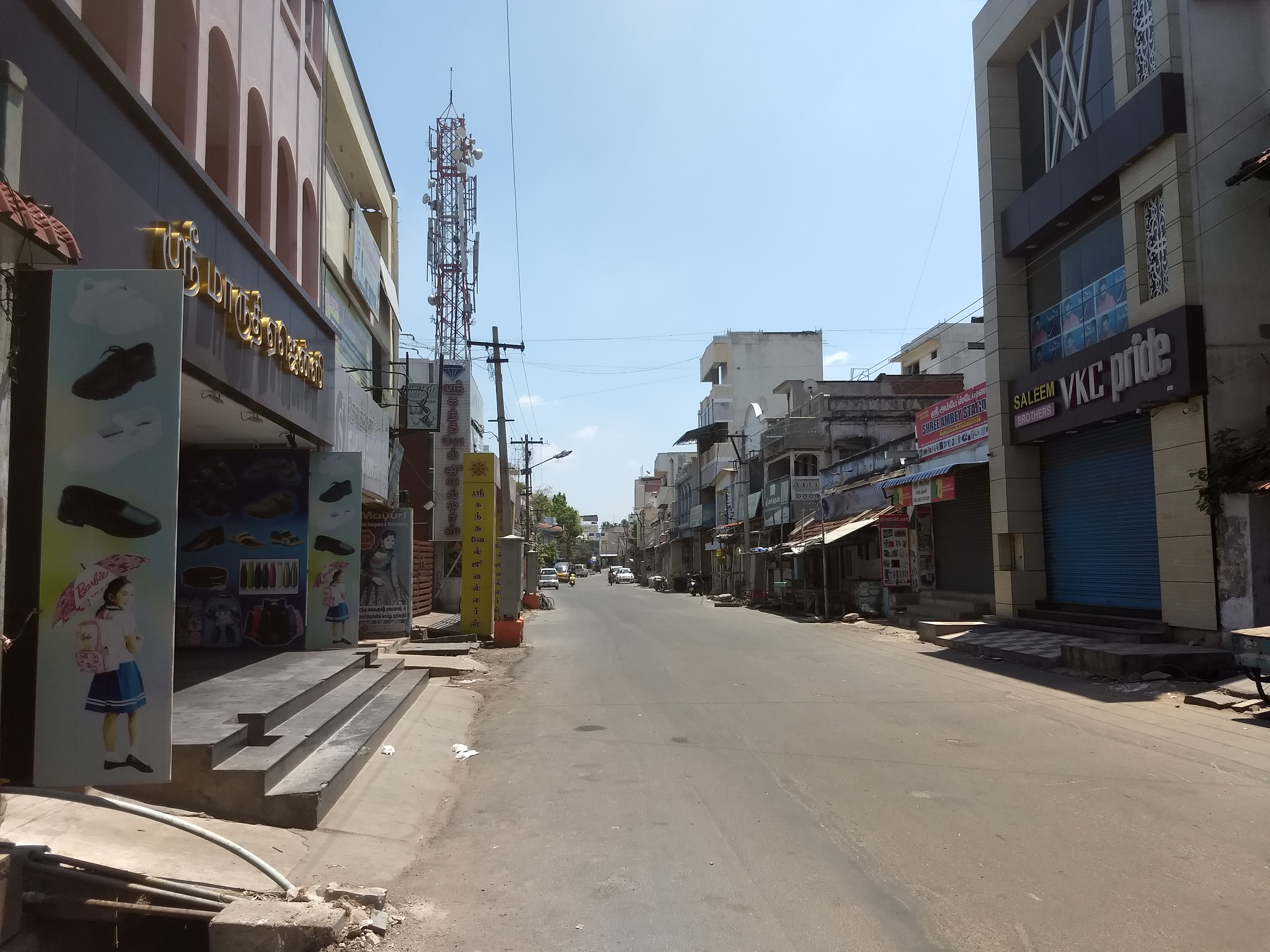
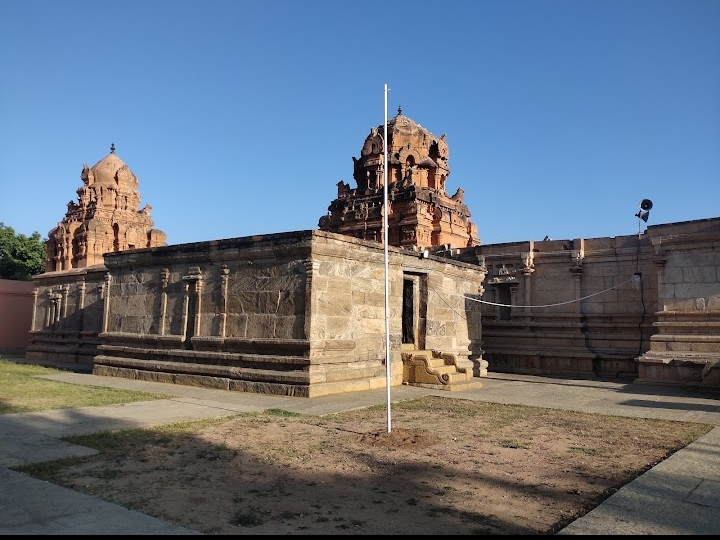
- From top, left to right: Noyyal River, Big bazaar street, Sukreeswarar Temple
- Nicknames: Knitwear capital, Textile city, Dollar city
- Tiruppur, Tamil Nadu
- Coordinates: 11.108500°N 77.341100°E
- Country: India
- State: Tamil Nadu
- District: Tiruppur

Government
  - Type: Municipal Corporation
  - Body: Tiruppur City Municipal Corporation
  - Mayor: N. Dinesh Kumar

Area
  - City: 159.6 km^{2} (61.6 sq mi)
  - Rank: 7
- Elevation: 330 m (1,080 ft)

Population (2011)
  - City: 877,778
  - Rank: 4th
  - Density: 5,500/km^{2} (14,240/sq mi)
  - Metro: 962,982
  - Metro rank: 5th

Languages
  - Official: Tamil, English
- Time zone: UTC+5:30 (IST)
- PIN: 6416xx
- Telephone code: +91-421
- Vehicle registration: TN 39 (North), TN 42 (South)
- GDP (2020): US$6.49 (equivalent to $8.07 in 2025) billion
- Website: tiruppur.tn.nic.in
- Population Note: The population as per official census 2011 calculated basis pre-expansion city limits was 444,352. Post expansion of city limits, the revised population was given as 877,778 by the Government of India during the smart cities mission in 2015. The 2011 census data for the urban agglomeration is available and has been provided.

Tiruppur or Tirupur ([t̪ɪɾɨppuːr]), is a city and municipal corporation in the Indian state of Tamil Nadu. Located on the banks of the Noyyal River in Western Tamil Nadu, it is the fourth largest city in the state. It is the administrative capital of Tiruppur district and is administered by the Tiruppur Municipal Corporation.

The region was ruled by the Cheras during the Sangam period between the 1st and the 4th centuries CE. It was under the rule of early Pandyas medieval Cholas, Later Cholas and the Vijayanagara Empire till the 15th century followed by the Nayaks who introduced the Palayakkarar system. In the later part of the 18th century, the it came under the Kingdom of Mysore and later the British Raj as a part of Madras Presidency. The region played a prominent role in the Poligar Wars.

After Indian independence in 1947, Tiruppur became part of Coimbatore district. It was established as the capital of the newly formed Tiruppur district in 2009. Tiruppur is a part of Tiruppur Lok Sabha constituency that elects its member of parliament. The town was predominantly an agricultural, but with the advent of textile boom in the 20th century and rapid industrialization has seen Tiruppur become a major textile and knitwear hub. As of 2021–22, Tiruppur contributed to nearly 54.2 percent of India's textile exports.

== Etymology ==
The name "Tiruppur" might have its origin from the Indian epic Mahabharata wherein cattle stolen from Pandavas were returned by Arjuna. It is a combination of two Tamil words, "Thiruppu" meaning "to turn" and "oor" meaning "a place" meaning "place where they were returned".

== History ==
Tiruppur formed a part of the Kongu Nadu region ruled by the Cheras during Sangam period. The region was part of a prominent Roman trade route that connected east and west coasts of India. The medieval Cholas conquered the Kongu Nadu in the tenth century CE and Chola stone carvings mention Kanchi Maanadhi (Noyyal River) and the fertile sand that it deposited on its banks.

The region came under the rule of the Vijayanagara Empire by the 15th century and later Palayakkarars, the chieftains of Madurai Nayaks ruled the region. In the later part of the 18th century, the region came under the Kingdom of Mysore, following a series of wars with the Madurai Nayak Dynasty. After the defeat of Tipu Sultan in the Anglo-Mysore Wars, the British East India Company annexed the region into the Madras Presidency in 1799.

Tiruppur was an agricultural town with irrigated farms and the farmers became small owners of various textile related units during the 1970s. The boom in the textile industry led to an inter woven network of the small scale units leading to growth of the city into a major textile hub. Tiruppur became a municipal corporation in 2008 and became the headquarters of a separate Tiruppur district was carved out from parts of Coimbatore and Erode districts in 2009.

== Geography ==
Tiruppur is located at 11.1075°N 77.3398°E on the banks of the Noyyal River. It has an average elevation of 295 m (968 ft) and covers an area of 159.6 km^{2} (61.6 sq mi).

== Climate ==
The climate in Tiruppur is hot semi-arid (Köppen BSh) with the mean maximum and minimum temperatures varying between 35 and 22 °C (95 and 72 °F). The summer occurs during the months March, April and May when the weather is hot and dry. The maximum temperature during the summer months will be around 35 °C (95 °F) and the minimum temperature will be around 29 °C (84 °F). The monsoon months are the months of June, July and August. These months are mainly characterised by mild showers and a reduced temperature. The post monsoon or winter months are September, October, November, December and January. These months generally have a cooler climate with temperatures rarely rise beyond a maximum of around 29 °C (84 °F). The minimum temperature during this season will be around 24 °C (75 °F).

Due to the presence of the Palghat gap, the city receives some rainfall from the south-west monsoon from June to August. After a humid September, the north-east monsoon brings rains from October which lasts till early December. The average annual rainfall is around 700 mm (28 in) with the north-east and the south-west monsoons contributing 47% and 28%, respectively, to the total. The soil is predominantly black, which is suitable for cotton cultivation, but Tiruppur district also has some red loamy soil. Tiruppur falls under the Class III/IV seismic zone, having experienced a 6.0 Richter scale earthquake in 1900.

Climate data for Tiruppur
Month	Jan	Feb	Mar	Apr	May	Jun	Jul	Aug	Sep	Oct	Nov	Dec	Year
Record high °C (°F)	27 (81)	30 (86)	33 (91)	34 (93)	33 (91)	29 (84)	28 (82)	27 (81)	28 (82)	28 (82)	27 (81)	26 (79)	41 (106)
Mean daily maximum °C (°F)	24 (75)	27 (81)	29 (84)	28 (82)	30 (86)	23 (73)	25 (77)	23 (73)	24 (75)	23 (73)	24 (75)	22 (72)	30 (86)
Mean daily minimum °C (°F)	18 (64)	19 (66)	21 (70)	23 (73)	23 (73)	22 (72)	22 (72)	22 (72)	22 (72)	22 (72)	21 (70)	19 (66)	21 (70)
Record low °C (°F)	15 (59)	17 (63)	20 (68)	22 (72)	21 (70)	20 (68)	20 (68)	20 (68)	20 (68)	19 (66)	18 (64)	16 (61)	12 (54)
Average rainfall mm (inches)	14 (0.6)	12 (0.5)	16 (0.6)	58 (2.3)	71 (2.8)	43 (1.7)	58 (2.3)	39 (1.5)	66 (2.6)	164 (6.5)	138 (5.4)	39 (1.5)	718 (28.3)
Source: Tiruppur District Collectorate

== Demographics ==
Historical population
Year	Pop.	±%
1881	3,681	—
1891	5,235	+42.2%
1901	6,056	+15.7%
1911	9,429	+55.7%
1921	10,851	+15.1%
1931	18,059	+66.4%
1941	33,099	+83.3%
1951	52,479	+58.6%
1961	79,773	+52.0%
1971	113,302	+42.0%
1981	165,223	+45.8%
1991	235,661	+42.6%
2001	346,551	+47.1%
2011	444,352	+28.2%
2015	877,778	+97.5%
Sources: 1871 - 2001; 2011; 2015 (Note that the area of the city was expanded post 2011)

Religious census
Religion	Percent(%)
Hindu	86.05%
Muslim	10.36%
Christian	3.33%
Other	0.26%

According to 2011 census, Tiruppur had a population of 444,352 with a sex-ratio of 955 females for every 1,000 males, above the national average of 929. The A total of 48,802 were under the age of six, constituting 24,818 males and 23,984 females. Scheduled Castes and Scheduled Tribes accounted for 5.47% and 0.06% of the population, respectively. The average literacy was 78.17%, compared to the national average of 72.99%. The city had a total of 124,617 households and a work force of 207,358. The area of Tiruppur was expanded in 2011 and the population was estimated as 877,778 in 2015.

As per the religious census of 2011, Tiruppur (M Corp.) had 86.05% Hindus, 10.36% Muslims, 3.33% Christians, 0.03% Sikhs, 0.01% Buddhists, 0.07% Jains, 0.14% following other religions and 0.01% following no religion or did not indicate any religious preference.

At per the 2011 census, 83.61% of the population in the erstwhile Tiruppur Municipal Corporation spoke Tamil, 6.65% Telugu, 3.35% Kannada, 2.31% Malayalam, 2.06% Urdu and 1.21% Hindi as their first language.

== Administration and politics ==
Administration
Mayor	N. Dinesh Kumar
Corporation commissioner	Pavankumar G. Giriyappanavar
Police commissioner	Praveen Kumar Abhinapu

Tiruppur is administered by Tiruppur Municipal Corporation headed by a mayor. The municipality was established in 1917 and was upgraded to a municipal corporation in 2008. The city is divided into 60 wards. Each ward is represented by a councillor who is elected by direct election and the mayor is elected by councillors. The executive wing of the corporation is headed by a corporation commissioner and is responsible for utility services like water supply, sewage and roads. Law and order is maintained by Tiruppur police headed by a police commissioner who is equivalent to the rank of Inspector-general of police. The city police manages seven police stations, three traffic police stations, and over 1,000 personnel. The Tiruppur District Court is the foremost judicial authority in the district.

Tiruppur has two assembly constituencies Tiruppur North and Tiruppur South. Tiruppur is part of Tiruppur Lok Sabha constituency which was created during the delimination in 2008 consisting parts of erstwhile Coimbatore, Gobichettipalayam and Palani constituencies.

== Economy ==
The economy of Tiruppur is primarily based on the textile industry. There are about 10,000 garment manufacturing and allied units in Tiruppur, employing over 600,000 people. As of 2021-22, Tiruppur exported garments worth 4.5 billion USD, which was nearly 54.2 percent of India's textile exports and 1.07 percent of India's overall exports. The city is known as the knitwear capital of India as it contributes to nearly 90% of the country’s cotton knitwear exports. In the 2010s, special economic zones including the Tiruppur Export Knitwear Industrial complex supporting 189 sheds and the Nethaji Apparel Park housing 53 companies have been established to support the textile industry. Some of the world's largest apparel companies including Nike, Adidas and Reebok import textiles and clothing from Tiruppur. According to Hurun India rich list in 2023, Tiruppur was amongst the top 20 cities in India in terms of the number of billionaires.

== Transport ==
=== Road ===
The following major highways serve Tiruppur:

Highway Number	Destination
NH-381	Avinashi
NH-381 / SH-37	Dharapuram
SH-196 / SH-81	Gobichettipalayam
SH-172	Kangeyam
SH-19	Pollachi
SH-169	Somanur
SH-19A	Vijayamangalam

Tiruppur has three major bus stations: Central (Old bus stand), North (New bus stand), and South (Kovilvazhi bus stand). Tiruppur is connected by moffusil bus services run by Tamil Nadu State Transport Corporation to other towns in the state and prominent cities in the neighbouring states of Kerala, Karnataka and Andhra Pradesh.

=== Rail ===
Tiruppur railway station is the major rail head serving the city, which is part of the Jolarpettai–Shoranur line broad gauge line. It is well connected by trains to destinations across India.

=== Air ===
The nearest airport is Coimbatore International Airport, located 45 km (28 mi) from the city, and has regular flights to major domestic destinations in India and select international destinations including Sharjah and Singapore.

== Utility services ==
While Tiruppur itself has only a few engineering colleges, but is located in proximity to the major educational hub of Coimbatore. There are 7 government hospitals at the taluk level with a total number of 896 beds and a total of 43 primary health centers in the rural areas Electricity supply is regulated and distributed by Tamil Nadu Electricity Board. The city and its suburbs forms part of the Tiruppur Electricity Distribution Circle, headed by a chief distribution engineer. Water supply and other public utility services are provided by the corporation.

== Environmental issues ==
Tiruppur, like any other industrial town, faces its share of environmental pollution complaints. Farmers in Tiruppur and its hinterland have faced issues due to the discharge of industrial effluents into Noyyal and other water bodies. Untreated effluents, mostly containing dyes and chemicals in high concentration are let off clandestinely once again in large quantities through storm water drains into water bodies or into open areas mostly during the early morning hours or during rain. In 2015, the Madras High Court directed that zero liquid discharge should be strictly followed by the knitwear industries during the effluent treatment process. Failure to implement this order, led to a court ordered closure of dyeing units and bleaching units. Tirupur Exporters Association made a representation to the Government of Tamil Nadu about loss of revenue and jobs due to the closure of dyeing units. As per a report by CRISIL in February 2011, ensuring Zero Liquid Discharge, will affect the operational costs of dyeing and bleaching units, increasing it by 7% to 10%. Eventually, by complying with the court order, Tiruppur became the first textile cluster in India to achieve zero liquid discharge in its units.

== Places of interest ==
Old temples in Tiruppur were built during the reign of Cholas and Pandyas. Temples in the area include Sukreeswarar Temple, Avinashilingeshwarar temple, Sivanmalai and Konganagiri. Other places of interest include Thirumoorthy Hills, Amaravathi Dam, Nanjarayan Tank Bird Sanctuary and Tiruppur Kumaran memorial.

== Notable people ==
- T. S. Avinashilingam, lawyer and politician
- Tiruppur Kumaran, freedom fighter
- C. P. Radhakrishnan, 15th Vice President of India
- T. A. Ramalingam, lawyer and politician
- Best Ramasamy, entrepreneur and politician
