= Tiruppur district =

- District of Tamil Nadu
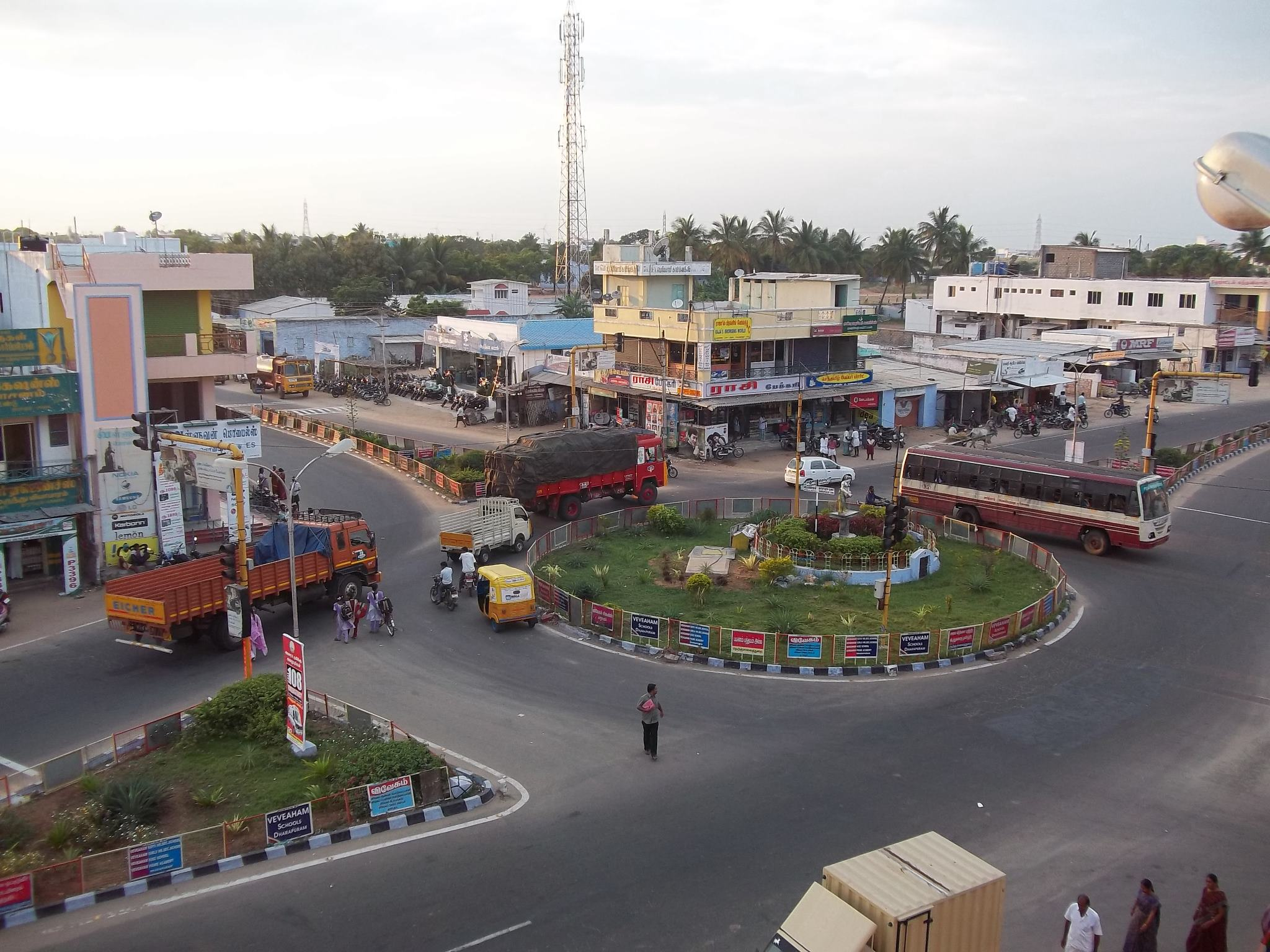
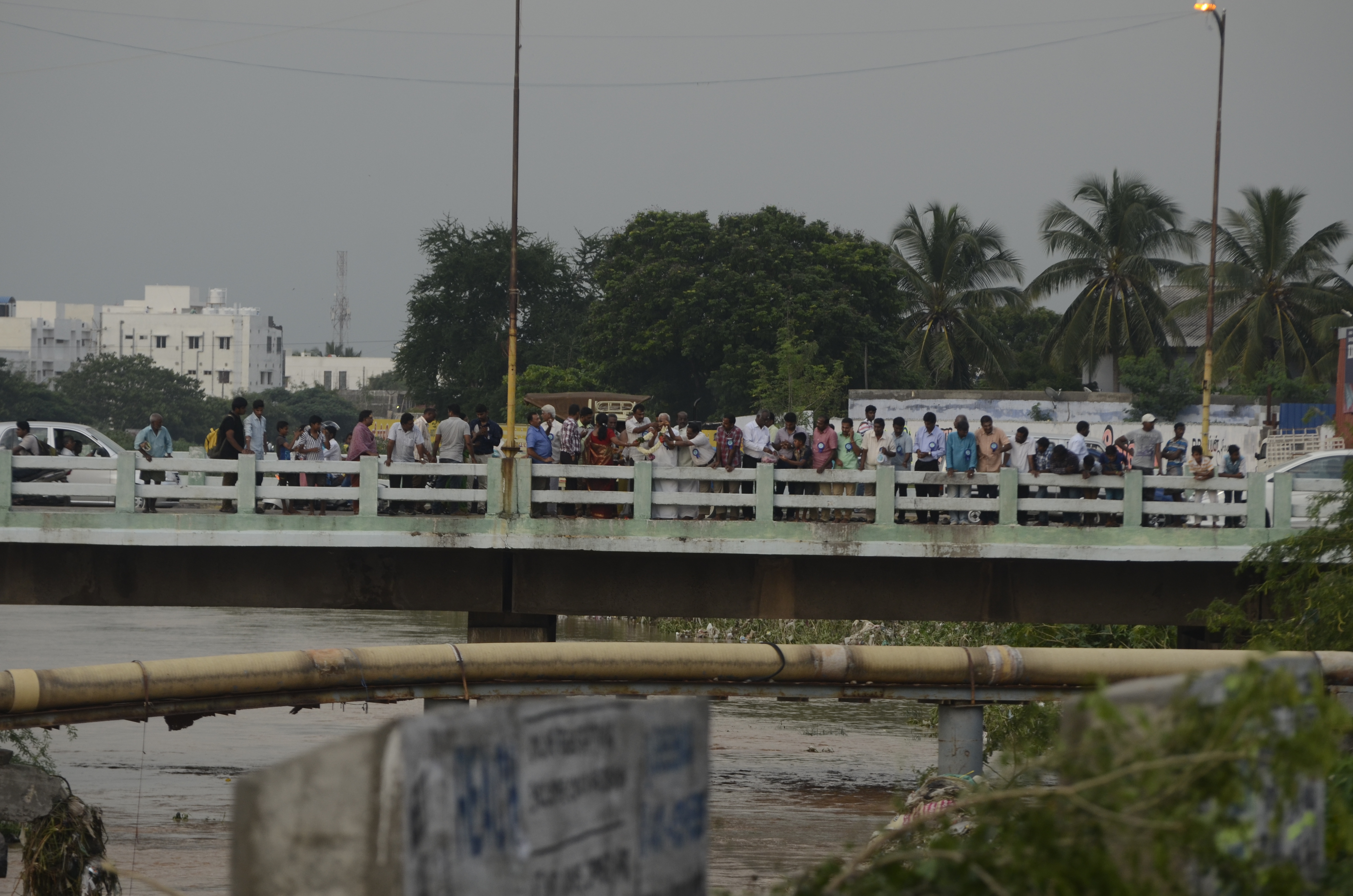
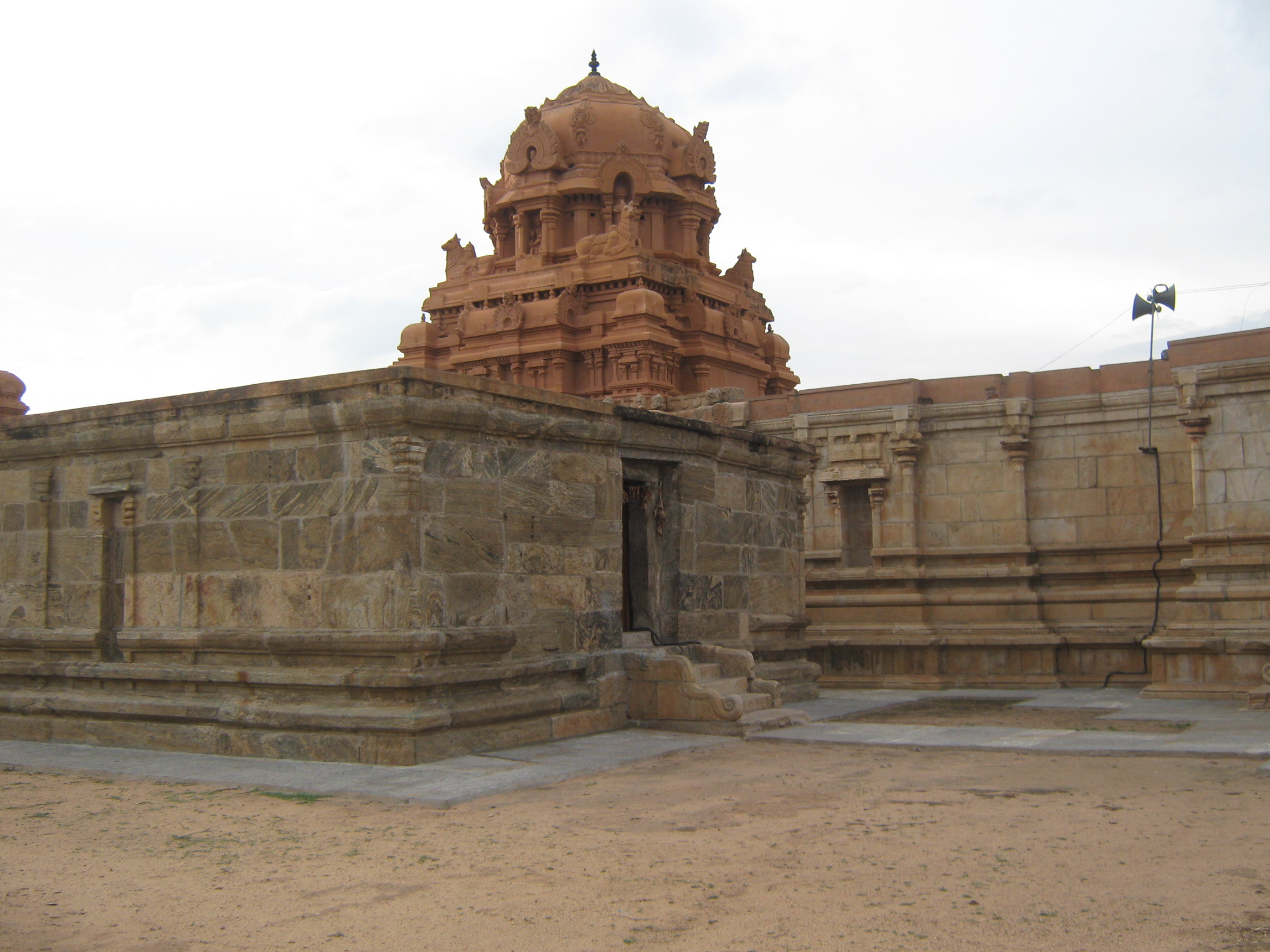
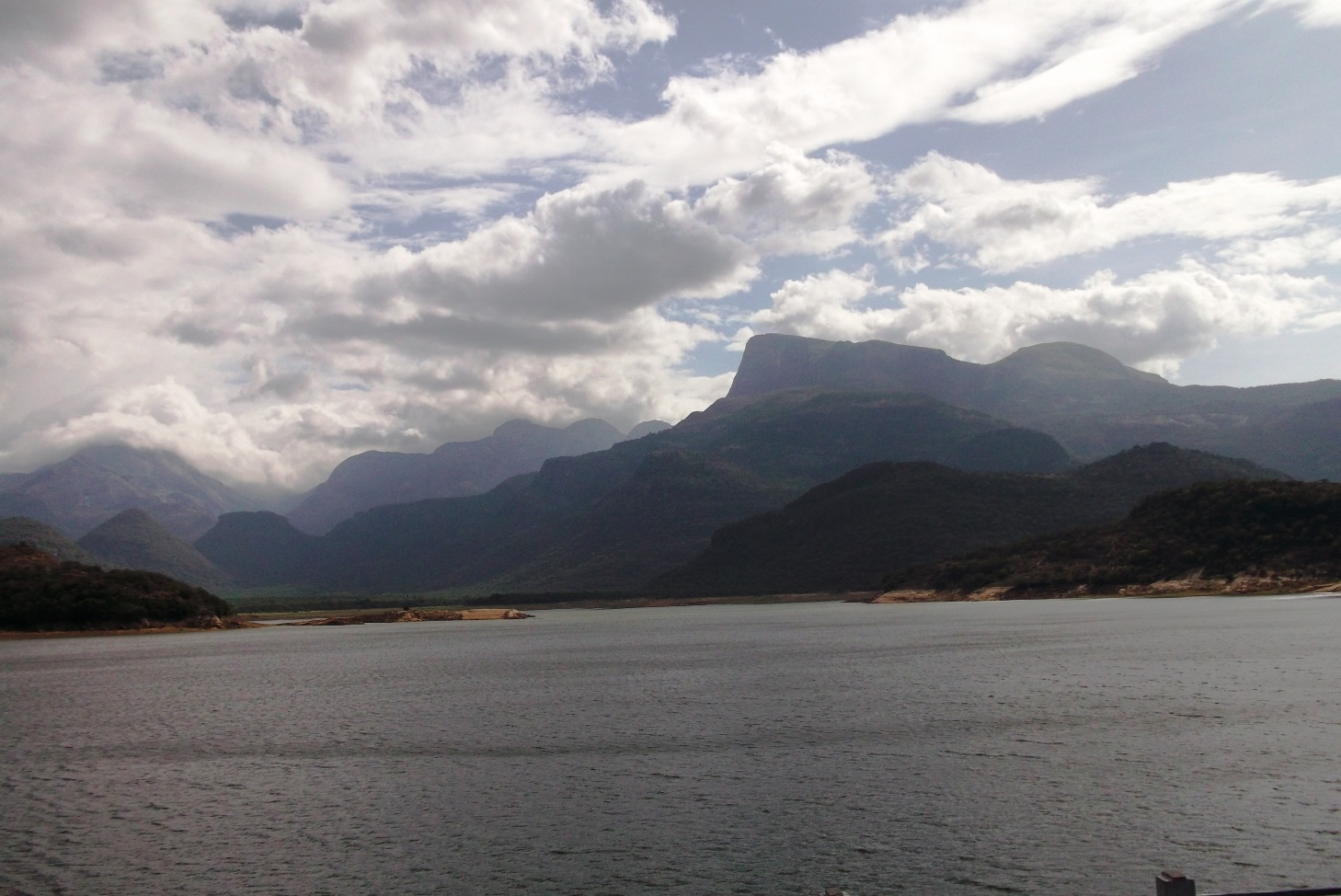
- Clockwise from top-left: Sri Venkatesha Perumal Temple, Mondipalayam, Amaravathi statue in Dharapuram, Thiru Sugriswara Temple, Amaravathi Dam, Bridge over the Noyyal River in Tiruppur

- Location in Tamil Nadu
- Tirupur district
- Coordinates: 11.18°N 77.25°E
- Country: India
- State: Tamil Nadu
- Headquarters: Tiruppur
- Taluks: Avinashi, Dharapuram, Kangeyam, Madathukulam, Palladam, Tiruppur North, Tiruppur South, Udumalaipettai, Uthukuli

Government
  - District Collector: Thiru Dr.S. Vineeth I.A.S

Population (2011)
  - Total: 2,479,052

Languages
  - Official: Tamil
- Time zone: UTC+5:30 (IST)
- Postal codes: 641xxx, 642xxx
- Telephone code: +91-0421
- Vehicle registration: TN-39, TN-39Z, TN-42, TN-42Y, TN-78, TN-78M
- Website: tiruppur.nic.in

Tiruppur district is one of the 38 districts of the Indian state of Tamil Nadu, formed in 22 February 2009. Dharapuram was the largest taluk by area in the district. The district is well-developed and industrialized. The Tiruppur banian industry, the cotton market, Kangeyam bull and Uthukkuli butter, among other things, provide for a vibrant economy. The city of Tiruppur is the administrative headquarters for the district. As of 2011, the district had a population of 2,479,052 with a sex-ratio of 989 females for every 1,000 males.

== History ==
The district is named after the city of Tiruppur. In Mahabaratha, Arjuna (the third of the Pandavas) returned the cattle captured by the enemies and returned to Dharapuram (நிறை மீட்டல், Nirai Meetal). It eventually become Nirai Thiruputhal and become Tiruppur.

Since the 1990s, the formation of the new Tiruppur district had been urged by the exporters of Tiruppur. Tiruppur city and surrounding region, where there is considerable industrial and business activities, was to be the core area. They believed that a new district would facilitate administration of the region and allow more aggressive development measures. Tiruppur district was formed in 2009, carved out of the Coimbatore and Erode districts making it the 32nd district of Tamil Nadu and one of the ten most industrialised and economically developed districts of Tamil Nadu.

Before the formation of Tiruppur district, Avinashi, Madathukulam, Palladam, Tiruppur, and Udumalpet were taluks of Coimbatore district; and Dharapuram and Kangeyam were taluks of Erode district. The new taluks of Madathukulam and Uthukuli were formed after the district was created.

== Geography and climate ==
Tiruppur district lies on the western part of Tamil Nadu bordering the Western Ghats and hence the district enjoys a moderate climate. The district is surrounded by Coimbatore district in the west, Erode district to the North and northeast and Karur district in the east and Dindigul district in the south east. To the south the district is surrounded by Idukki district of Kerala. The district has an area of 5187 sq. km. The southern and south western parts of the district (Madathukulam and Udumalpet) enjoys maximum rainfall, due to the surrounding of western ghats. The rest of the district lies in the rain shadow region of the Western Ghats and experiences salubrious climate most parts of the year, except the extreme east part of the district. The mean maximum and minimum temperatures for Tiruppur city during summer and winter vary between 35 °C to 18 °C. The average annual rainfall in the plains is around 700 mm with the North East and the South West monsoons contributing to 47% and 28%, respectively, to the total rainfall. The major rivers flowing through the district are Noyyal and Amaravathi. The Amaravati river is the main source of irrigation in the district. Amaravathi Dam, which created Amaravathi Reservoir, is located at Amaravathinagar. Thirumurthy dam which is created by the PAP project is situated in this district. Both Amaravathi dam and Thirumurthy dam are the prime source of irrigation in the district, whereas Uppaar dam is another dam which receives water from seasonal rains.

== Demographics ==
Historical population
Year	Pop.	±% p.a.
1901	516,618	—
1911	553,598	+0.69%
1921	588,291	+0.61%
1931	655,837	+1.09%
1941	754,273	+1.41%
1951	884,545	+1.61%
1961	949,859	+0.71%
1971	1,130,940	+1.76%
1981	1,324,480	+1.59%
1991	1,531,983	+1.47%
2001	1,920,154	+2.28%
2011	2,479,052	+2.59%

Religions in Tiruppur district (2011)
Religion	Percent
Hinduism	91.92%
Islam	5.00%
Christianity	2.82%
Other or not stated	0.26%

According to 2011 census, Tiruppur district had a population of 2,479,052 with a sex-ratio of 989 females for every 1,000 males, much above the national average of 929. 61.35% of the population lived in urban areas. A total of 241,351 were under the age of six, constituting 123,612 males and 117,739 females. Scheduled Castes and Scheduled Tribes accounted for 15.97% and 0.22% of the population respectively. The average literacy of the district was 71.02%, compared to the national average of 72.99%. The district had a total of 712,210 households. There were a total of 1,266,137 workers, comprising 130,331 cultivators, 216,945 main agricultural labourers, 36,139 in house hold industries, 785,181 other workers, 97,541 marginal workers, 5,486 marginal cultivators, 29,388 marginal agricultural labourers, 4,849 marginal workers in household industries and 57,818 other marginal workers.

Languages of Tiruppur district (2011)
1. Tamil (83.8%)
2. Telugu (11.0%)
3. Kannada (2.29%)
4. Malayalam (1.19%)
5. Urdu (0.93%)
6. Others (0.73%)

At the time of the 2011 census, 83.82% of the population spoke Tamil, 11.04% Telugu, 2.29% Kannada, 1.19% Malayalam and 0.93% Urdu as their first language.

== Administration and politics ==
Tiruppur district is administered by a collector, presently K. Vijaya Karthikeyan.

=== Revenue Divisions and Taluks ===
Tiruppur Revenue Division: Tiruppur North, Tiruppur South, Palladam, Avinashi, Uthukuli

Dharapuram Revenue Division: Dharapuram, Kangeyam

Udumalpet Revenue Division: Udumalpet, Madathukulam

=== Municipal corporations ===
- Tiruppur Municipal Corporation (TCMC)

=== Municipalities ===
- Dharapuram
- Udumalpet
- Palladam
- Kangeyam
- Vellakoil
- Thirumuruganpoondi
- Avinashi

=== Town Panchayats ===
- Madathukulam
- Uthukuli
- Mulanur
- Chinnakkampalayam
- Dhali
- Kaniyur
- Kannivadi
- Kolathupalayam
- Komaralingam
- Kunnathur
- Muthur
- Rudravathi
- Samalapuram
- Sankaramanallur
- Nathakadaiyur

=== Proposed Greater Tiruppur ===
- Tiruppur Municipal Corporation
- Thirumuruganpoondi Municipality

=== Proposed Municipalities ===
- Madathukulam
- Uthukuli

=== Proposed Town Panchayats ===
- Kamanaickenpalayam
- Uthiyur
- Pongalur
- Kundadam
- Gudimangalam
- Semmipalayam
- Padiyur
- Velayudampalayam

=== Panchayat Unions / Blocks ===
- Dharapuram
- Mulanur
- Kundadam
- Kangeyam
- Vellakoil
- Avanashi
- Uthukuli
- Tiruppur
- Palladam
- Pongalur
- Udumalaipettai
- Gudimangalam
- Madathukulam

=== Parliamentary constituencies ===
- Tiruppur (Part)
- Pollachi (Part)
- Coimbatore (Part)
- Erode (Part)
- The Nilgiris (Part)

=== Assembly constituencies ===
- Avanashi
- Tiruppur North
- Tiruppur South
- Palladam
- Dharapuram
- Kangeyam
- Udumalpet
- Madathukulam

== Politics ==
District	No.	Constituency	Name	Party	Alliance	Remarks			
Tiruppur	101	Dharapuram (SC)	P. Sathyabama	AIADMK	AIADMK+	Supported TVK			
Tiruppur	101	Dharapuram (SC)	Vacant			On 25 May 2026, resigned from office and officially joined TVK			
Tiruppur	102	Kangayam	N. S. N. Nataraj	AIADMK	AIADMK+	Supported TVK; Later declared support for EPS			
Tiruppur	112	Avanashi (SC)	S. Kamali	AIADMK	AIADMK+		TVK	TVK+	Cabinet Minister
Tiruppur	113	Tiruppur North	V. Sathyabama				TVK	TVK+	
Tiruppur	114	Tiruppur South	S. Balamurugan				TVK	TVK+	
Tiruppur	115	Palladam	K. Ramkumar				TVK	TVK+	
Tiruppur	125	Udumalaipettai	M. Jayakumar	DMK	SPA				
Tiruppur	126	Madathukulam	R. Jayaramakrishnan	DMK	SPA				

== Economy ==
The city of Tirupur, at the heart of the district, is a textile center. The agricultural sector is predominantly small and has marginal farmers with land holdings of less than two hectares.

== See also ==
- Andiagoundanoor
- Appiayapalayam
- Kongu Tamil
- List of districts of Tamil Nadu
- Ponnapuram
- Thandukkaran palayam
