= Puliyur =

Puliyur may refer to:

- Puliyur, Karur, a town in Karur district in Tamil Nadu, India
- Puliyur, Nagapattinam, a village in Nagapattinam district in Tamil Nadu, India
- Puliyoor, a village in Alappuzha district in Kerala, India
- Puliyur, Sivagangai district; located near Madurai in Tamil Nadu
