= Vadugapatti, Karur =

Vadugapatti
- village
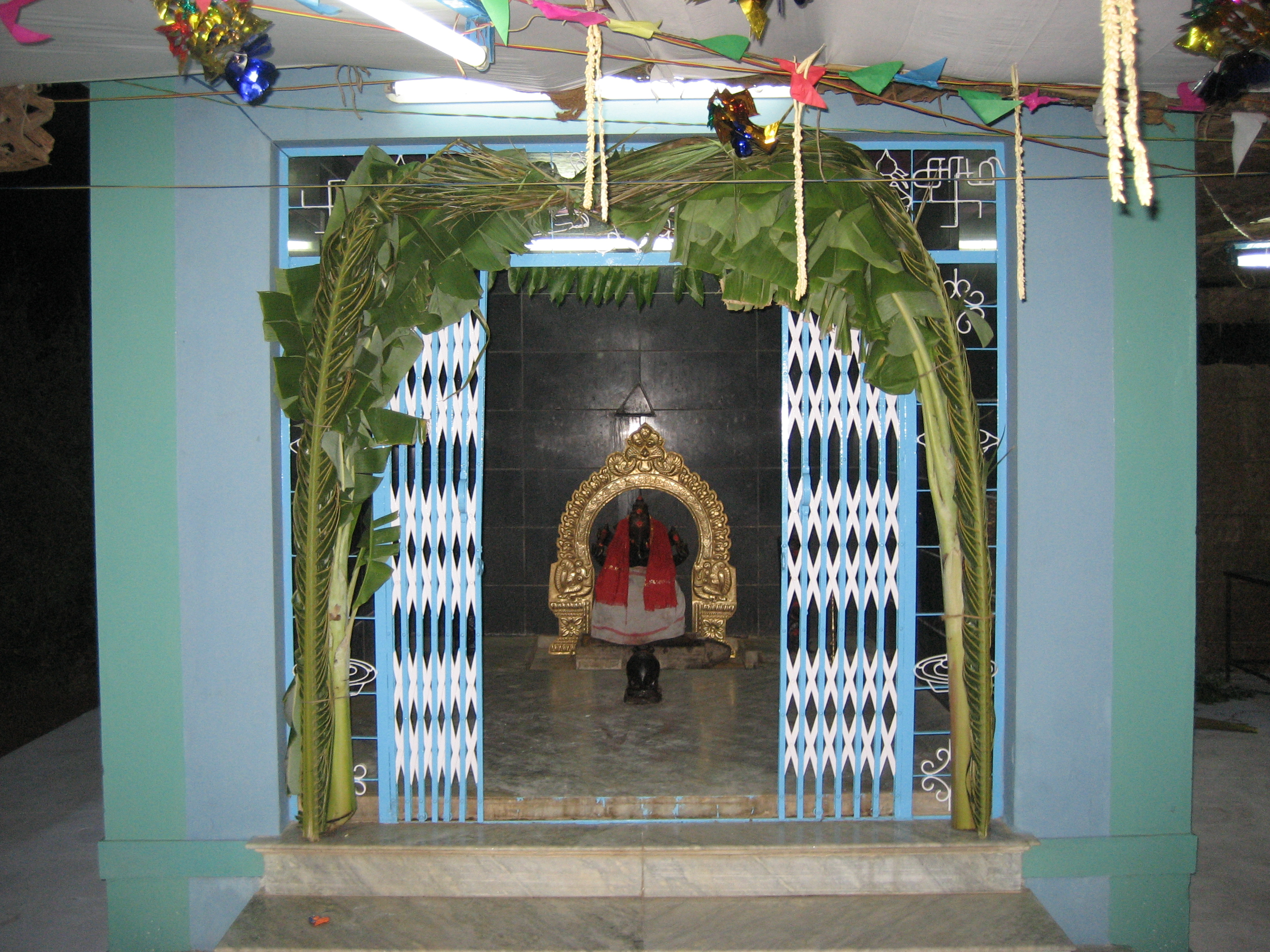
- Vinayaga Temple, Vadugapatti
- Country: India
- State: Tamil Nadu
- District: Karur

Languages
  - Official: Tamil
- Time zone: UTC+5:30 (IST)
- Vehicle registration: TN-

Kaliamman Temple, Vadugapatti

Vadugapatti is a small village in Karur district in the Indian state of Tamil Nadu. It is located 8 km northwest from Pallapatti or 10 km southwest from Aravakurichi. The total population is around 350. But the natives of this village are residing outside. As a grant total, it covers a population of around 2,000. It is a dry area with very poor rainfall. The main occupation of the people is sheep rearing. In addition, they cultivate drumstick, sorghum, millets, cotton, chili etc.
