= Ki. Va. Jagannathan =

Tamil Scholar, Editor, Poet, Orator, Writer and folklorist (1906–1988)

- கி. வா. ஜகந்நாதன்
- Born: 11 April 1906; Krishnarayapuram, Trichinopoly District, Madras Presidency, British India (now in Karur district, Tamil Nadu, India)
- Died: 4 November 1988 (aged 82); Madras (now Chennai), Tamil Nadu, India
- Occupations: Tamil journalist, poet, writer, folklorist
- Spouse: Alamelu (m. 1932)
- Children: Swaminathan, Kumaranathan (Sons), Murugan, Uma (Daughters).
- Parent(s): Vasudevan (Father) & Parvathiammal (Mother)
- Writing career
- Pen name: Ki. Va. Ja
- Notable awards: Sahitya Akademi Award (1967)

Krishnarayapuram Vasudevan Jagannathan / Ki. Va. Jagannathan (11 April 1906 – 4 November 1988) popularly known by his Pen Name as Ki. Va. Ja, was an Indian Tamil scholar, commentator, journalist, poet, writer and folklorist from Tamil Nadu, India.

== Career ==
Ki. Va. Jagannathan was a student of noted Tamil scholar and publisher U. V. Swaminatha Iyer. He was the editor of the magazine Kalaimagal. He won the Sahitya Akademi award in 1967 in Tamil language category for his literary criticism Virar Ulagam. He has written extensive commentaries on many Tamil devotional texts including Kandar Alangaram, Kandar Anubhuti, Thirumurugattruppadai, Abirami Andathi and Kandar Kalivenba. He has written more than 200 books on various topics in Tamil literature and grammar. He was a great orator and was popularly known as Vageesa Kalanidhi, a title bestowed on him by Kanchi Paramacharya.

In 2007, his works were nationalised by the Government of Tamil Nadu

== Works ==
=== Literary criticism \ Essays ===
- Virar Ulagam. In 1967, he won the Sahitya Akademi Award.
- Karpaga Malar - Essay on Thirukural
- Vazhum Thamizh Tholkappiyam
- Pudhu Vellam: Sanga Nool kaatchigal
- Manai Vilakku Sanga Noorkatchigal
- Arappor: Sanga Nool kaatchigal
- Pidiyum Kalirum: Sanga Nool kaatchigal
- Inba Malai: Sanga Nool kaatchigal
- Manai Vilakku: Sanga Nool kaatchigal
- Thamarai poigal: Sanga Nool kaatchigal
- Thirukural Araichi Pathippu
- Oru San Vayiru
- Anandha Vellam
- Tamil Novelin Thotramum Valarchium
- Tamil Pazhalamozhigal 250000
- Kannith Thamil
- Kaviyamum Oviyamum
- Parambu Malai Vallal
- Vazhum Thamil
- En Asiriya Piran
- Thirumurugatrupadai:(with Commentaries)
- Ezhu Peru Vallalgal
- Pandiyan Nedunchezhian
- Amudha Ilakkiya Kadhaigal
- Vaazhkai Suzhal
- Kadai Ezhu Vallagal: Seven Great Philanthropists of Ancient Tamil Nadu
- Adiyaman Neduman Anji
- Karikal Valavan
- Illakiya Kathaikal

=== Religious Book ===
- Perum Payar Murugan
- Periya Purana Vilakkam (10 Parts)
- Ramana Maamunivar
- Anubhuti Vilakkam
- Abhirami Anthathi Vilakkam

=== Novel ===
- Moondru Thalaimurai

=== Folk Song Collections ===
- Malai Aruvi

=== Short Stories ===
- Kumariyin Mookuthi
- Puthu Merugu
- Athisaya Penn
- Kilaviyin Thantiram

=== Collection of Speeches ===
- Ullam Kulirnthathu
- Thani Veedu
- Omkara Oligal
- Iru Vilakku
- Adiyarukku Nalla Perumal
- Sirikka Vaikkirar Ki.Va.Ja
- Ki va ja sledaigal

== See also ==
- List of Sahitya Akademi Award winners for Tamil
- List of Indian writers
- List of Tamil-language writers
