= R. Sasikala =

Member of the Tamil Nadu Legislative Assembly
- In office 2001–2006
- Preceded by: S. Nagarathinam
- Succeeded by: P. Kamaraj
- Constituency: Krishnarayapuram

Personal details
- Born: 24 June 1974 (age 51) Kilavaladi, Tamil Nadu, India
- Party: All India Anna Dravida Munnetra Kazhagam
- Occupation: Agriculture

R. Sasikala is an Indian politician and a former Member of the Tamil Nadu Legislative Assembly. She hails from Kulithalai town in the Karur district. A postgraduate degree holder and a member of the All India Anna Dravida Munnetra Kazhagam (AIADMK) party, she contested and won the 2001 Tamil Nadu Legislative Assembly election from the Krishnarayapuram Assembly constituency to become an MLA.

== Electoral Performance ==
=== 2001 ===
2001 Tamil Nadu Legislative Assembly election: Krishnarayapuram
Party	Candidate	Votes	%	±%
AIADMK	R. Sasikala	64,046	55.09%	+18.01
DMK	S. Periyasamy	42,497	36.56%	−13.79
MDMK	P. Rajendran	4,380	3.77%	New
Independent	V. Rengasamy	2,576	2.22%	New
Independent	R. Raju	988	0.85%	New
Independent	R. Raju	698	0.60%	New
Thaayaga Makkal Katchi	P. Perumal	667	0.57%	New
Margin of victory		21,549	18.54%	5.28%
Turnout		1,16,247	65.80%	−5.33%
Registered electors		1,76,754		
AIADMK gain from DMK		Swing	4.75%	
