= Thanthoni (disambiguation) =

Thanthoni can refer to:

- Thanthoni, a panchayat town in Tamil Nadu
- Thanthonni (also spelled Thanthonny and Thanthony), a Malayalam film released in 2010
