= Thotti =

- town
- Location in Tamil Nadu, India
- Coordinates: 12.509192°N 77.709259°E
- Country: India
- State: Tamil Nadu
- District: Karur

Languages
  - Official: Tamil
- Time zone: UTC+5:30 (IST)
- Vehicle registration: TN-

Thotti is a small village in dharmapuri district, situated 80 km north-west of dharmapuri, in Tamil Nadu, India. It is located near the Cauvery River, about 20 km north-west of Musiri.

Sri Ranganathaswamy Temple and temple museum at Srirangam, Namakkal, and Karaivetti Bird Sanctuary in Perambalur District are some tourist spots worth visiting around.

The nearest airport is at Tiruchirapalli. Kulitalai Railway Station serves Thottiyam.
