= M. Geetha =

Indian politician

Member-Legislative Assembly of Tamil Nadu.
- In office 2016–2021
- Preceded by: S. Kamaraj
- Succeeded by: K. Sivagama Sundari
- Constituency: Krishnarayapuram

Personal details
- Born: 27 October 1972 Chennai
- Party: All India Anna Dravida Munnetra Kazhagam
- Profession: Teacher

M. Geetha is an Indian politician and a former Member of the Legislative Assembly (MLA) of Tamil Nadu.

== Birth and residence ==
Geetha was born in Chennai and resides in Nerur Vadabagam, Karur District.

== Education ==
Geetha holds a Master of Science (M.Sc.) degree in Physics from the Presidency College, Chennai, and a Bachelor of Education (B.Ed.) degree from Thirumalachariar National College in Triplicane. Geetha previously worked as a teacher.

== Political career ==
Belonging to the All India Anna Dravida Munnetra Kazhagam (AIADMK) party, she contested and won the election to the Tamil Nadu Legislative Assembly in 2016 from the Krishnarayapuram Assembly constituency, thereby becoming an MLA.

== Electoral performance ==
=== 2016 ===
2016 Tamil Nadu Legislative Assembly election: Krishnarayapuram
Party	Candidate	Votes	%	±%
AIADMK	M. Geetha	83,977	49.82%	−4.99
PT	V. K. Aiyyar	48,676	28.88%	New
TMC(M)	K. Sivanantham	10,043	5.96%	New
BJP	P. Naveenkumar	5,673	3.37%	+2.84
Independent	M. Pagalavan	5,153	3.06%	New
NOTA	NOTA	4,742	2.81%	New
NTK	P. Thavamani	2,024	1.20%	New
KMDK	M. Murugan	1,562	0.93%	New
Independent	C. Sathis Kumar	1,401	0.83%	New
Independent	L. Elavalagan	1,385	0.82%	New
PMK	M. Pandiyan	1,327	0.79%	New
Margin of victory		35,301	20.94%	6.10%
Turnout		1,68,559	83.01%	−3.70%
Registered electors		2,03,049		
AIADMK hold		Swing	-4.99%	
