= Velliyanai =

Village in Tamil Nadu, India

Coordinates: 10°51′N 78°07′E

Velliyanai is a small village panchayat in the Karur district of the state of Tamil Nadu in southern India. It belongs to the Thanthonimalai panjayat union and Karur Taluk. The village is around 10 kilometres (6.2 mi) from the city of Karur. The nearest airport is Tiruchirapalli Airport. It is famous for the adhirasam (அதிரசம்), which is a sweet, made in that region.
