= Inam Karur =

- City
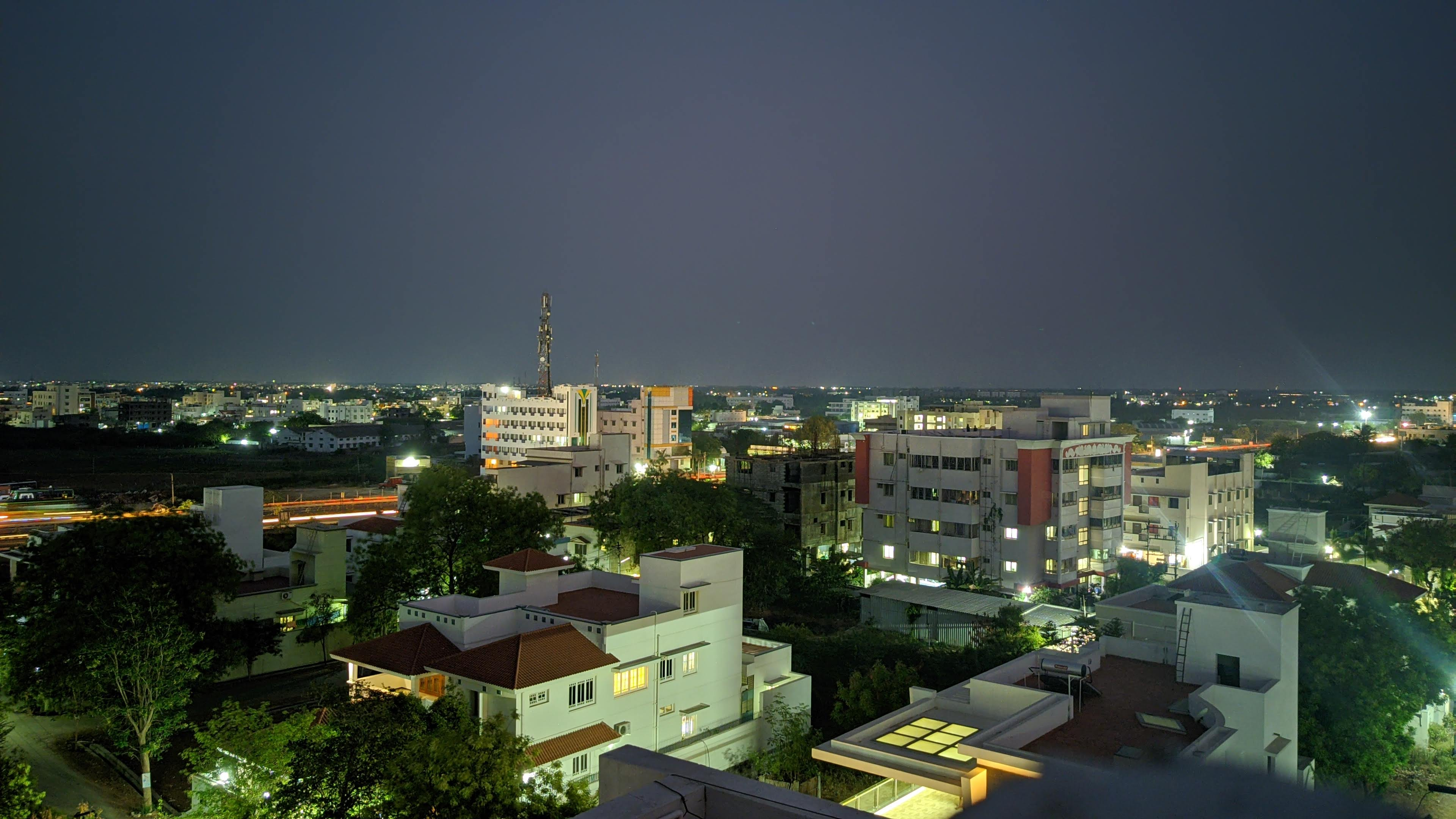

- Location in Tamil Nadu, India Inam Karur (India)
- Coordinates: 10°58′50″N 78°04′57″E
- Country: India
- State: Tamil Nadu
- District: Karur

Population (2011)
  - Total: 67,131

Languages
  - Official: Tamil
- Time zone: UTC+5:30 (IST)

Inam Karur is a municipality in Karur district in the Indian state of Tamil Nadu. As of 2011, the town had a population of 67,131.

== Demographics ==
Religious census
Religion	Percent(%)
Hindu	94.75%
Muslim	3.16%
Christian	1.88%
Sikh	0.01%
Buddhist	0.01%
Other	0.18%
No religion	0.01%

According to 2011 census, Inam Karur had a population of 67,131 with a sex-ratio of 1,000 females for every 1,000 males, much above the national average of 929. A total of 6,724 were under the age of six, constituting 3,513 males and 3,211 females. Scheduled Castes and Scheduled Tribes accounted for 9.79% and .05% of the population respectively. The average literacy of the district was 78.39%, compared to the national average of 72.99%. The district had a total of 18989 households. There were a total of 30,043 workers, comprising 256 cultivators, 361 main agricultural labourers, 1,191 in house hold industries, 27,066 other workers, 1,169 marginal workers, 21 marginal cultivators, 22 marginal agricultural labourers, 125 marginal workers in household industries and 1,001 other marginal workers. As per the religious census of 2011, Inam Karur had 94.75% Hindus, 3.16% Muslims, 1.88% Christians, 0.01% Sikhs, 0.01% Buddhists, 0.18% following other religions and 0.01% following no religion or did not indicate any religious preference.
