= Pothuravuthanpatty =

- Village
- Location in Tamil Nadu, India Pothuravuthanpatty (India)
- Coordinates: 10.503°N 78.1953°E
- Country: India
- State: Tamil Nadu
- District: Karur
- Taluka: Krishnarayapuram

Population (2011)
  - Total: 5,062

Languages
  - Official: Tamil
- Time zone: UTC+5:30 (IST)
- PIN: 6390(xx)
- Telephone code: 91-(0)4323
- Vehicle registration: TN 47

Pothuravuthanpatty is a village in the Karur district of India.

== Demographics ==
It has 1135 households and a total population of 5062 (2526 male and 2536 female). 2408 of the people are literate (1536 male, 872 female). 601 people are in scheduled castes. 3200 of the population are working population. Census 2001 unless mentioned otherwise

== Features ==
- School - Govt School, Play Way School
- Temple - Mariamman Kovil, perumal Kovil, Murugan Kovil, Karuppasamy Kovil, Vinayagar Kovil
- Hospital - Govt Hospital.
- Mother Village-Pothuravuthanpatty
- Hamlets: 1. Vellaipparaippatty 2.Vellappatty 3.Kullampatty 4.Kakkayampatty 5.Panaiyurpatty 6.Chinnagoundanpatty 7.Ayyampalaya m 8.Sembaraippatty 9.Vadugappatty 10.Kalupatty 11.Athikaranpatty 12.Saradakkiyur 13.Muthalampatty 14.Muthupudaiyanpatty
- Aiyar Malai - Also called Aivar Malai, this hill is located at about 10 km South of Kulithalai. On top of this hill resides Rathinagireeshwarar (Shiva). This hill has over 1000 steps. This path is a tough climb as it is almost 60 to 70 degrees inclined to the base. Full Moon days and somavaram (Mondays) during the Tamil Month of Karthigai are considered very special to visit the God here.
- Railway Station - Nearby Railway Station Kulithalai in 17 km . Trains to Chennai, Coimbatore, Erode, Tiruchy, Bangalore, Mysore & Mangalore are passing this route.

== Politics ==
Current (2009) Chief Minister of Tamil Nadu, Karunanidhi was first elected to the Tamil Nadu assembly in 1957 from Kulithalai assembly constituency (then in Thiruchirapalli district). Kulithalai assembly constituency is part of Perambalur (Lok Sabha constituency).

Mr. R.Manickam is the current Member of Legislative Assembly (MLA). During his period there are many development activities carried out. Kulithalai Govt. Arts College, New Court Buildings, New buildings to Police stations and Govt. Hospitals, Maintenance of Cauvery river bridge, Kalaignar Veetuvasathi thittam etc... are some main activities that are carried out.

Actor Mr. D.Nepolian is the current Member of Parliament (MP).
