= Mahadanapuram =

Mahadhanapuram is a village in Krishnarayapuram Block in Karur district of Tamil Nadu State, India. It is located 28 KM towards East from District head quarters Karur. 2 KM from Krishnarayapuram. 370 KM from State capital Chennai.

Mahadhanapuram Pin code is 639106 and postal head office is Mahadhanapuram .

Krishnarayapuram ( 3 KM ), Chinthalavadi ( 4 KM ), Kallapalli ( 5 KM ), Karuppathur ( 6 KM ), Thirukkampuliyur ( 6 KM ) are the nearby Villages to Mahadhanapuram.

== Festival ==
Mahalakshmi Temple is a popular shrine dedicated to Goddess Lakshmi at Mahadanapuram near Krishnarayapuram in Karur District in Tamil Nadu. The most important festival in the temple is the Aadi Perukku which is held on the 18th day of Aadi Masam.

A unique ritual performed here by devotees has made the temple famous. People clean shave their hair on the head and break coconuts for wish fulfillment and after wishes are fulfilled.
