= Marudur =

Marudur may refer to:

- Marudur, Karur, a panchayat town in Karur district in Tamil Nadu, India
- Marudur, Coimbatore, a panchayat village in Coimbatore district, Tamil Nadu, India
- Marudur Gopala Ramachandran or M. G. Ramachandran (1917–1987), Indian actor and former Chief Minister of Tamil Nadu

== See also ==
- Marwar, also Marudhar, region in Rajasthan, India
- Marudhuri Raja, Indian film writer
