= Aravakurichi taluk =

Coordinates: 10.77°N 77.92°E

The Aravakurichi taluk is a taluk of the Karur district in the Indian state of Tamil Nadu. The taluk is based around the city of the same name.

== Geography & Location ==
The Aravakurichi taluk is located to the south of Karur. It borders the Tirupur district to the west and the Dindigul District to the south. Pallapatti is the largest town in this taluk.

== Demographics ==
As of the 2011 census, the taluk of had a population of 183,037 with 90,503 males and 92,534 females. There were 1022 women for every 1000 men. The taluk had a literacy rate of 68.75. Child population below six was 7283 males and 6860 females.
