= Vadugapatti =

Vadugapatti may refer to three places in Tamil Nadu, India:

- Vadugapatti, Erode, a panchayat town
- Vadugapatti, Karur, a village
- Vadugapatti, Theni, a panchayat town
