= Esanatham =

Esanatham Isanatham
- village
- Location in Tamil Nadu, India Esanatham (India)
- Coordinates: 10.707683°N 78.002739°E
- Country: India
- State: Tamil Nadu
- District: Karur

Languages
  - Official: Tamil
- Time zone: UTC+5:30 (IST)
- PIN: 639203
- Telephone code: 04320
- Vehicle registration: TN 47
- Nearest city: Karur
- Literacy: 75%
- Lok Sabha constituency: Karur
- Vidhan Sabha constituency: Aravakurichi

Esanatham is a village in Tamil Nadu, India. It is part of Karur District and surrounded by villages of the Dindigul District.

== Nearest towns and cities ==
- Dindigul - 47 km
- Karur - 36 km
- Trichy - 94 km
- Madurai - 111 km
- Coimbatore - 139 km

== Demographics ==
According to the 2011 census of India, Esanatham had a population of 5311 consisting of 1490 households. The male population was 2604 and the female population 2707 with 8.81% of the population aged six or under. The literacy rate was 75.12%, which was lower than the state average of 80.09%. Literacy stood at 86.31% for men and 64.55% for women. The child sex ratio was 857, as compared to the state ratio of 943.

820 of the population were members of a Scheduled Caste (SC).

=== Work Profile ===
2708 residents of Esanatham were engaged in work activities.
