= V. T. Krishnamachari =

Indian civil servant and administrator

Rao Bahadur Sir Vangal Thiruvenkatachari Krishnamachari KCSI KCIE

Vice-President of the Planning Commission of India

Prime Minister of Jaipur
- In office 1946–1949

Diwan of Baroda
- In office 1927–1944
- Monarch: Sayajirao Gaekwad III

Personal details
- Born: 8 February 1881 Vangal, Trichy District, British India
- Died: 14 February 1964 (aged 83) Madras, India
- Party: Indian National Congress
- Spouse: Rangammal
- Children: Vedammal Gopala Iyengar, V. K. Thiruvenkatachari, V. K. Rangaswami, Jayammal Srinivasan, V. K. Ramaswami (1928–1969)
- Education: Presidency College, Madras
- Occupation: Lawyer, civil servant, Madras Law College

Rao Bahadur Sir Vangal Thiruvenkatachari Krishnamachari KCSI, KCIE (8 February 1881 – 14 February 1964) was an Indian civil servant and administrator. He served as the Diwan of Baroda from 1927 to 1944, Prime Minister of Jaipur State from 1946 to 1949 and as a member of the Rajya Sabha from 1961 to 1964.

== Early life ==
Krishnamachari was born in the village of Vangal in the then Salem District on 8 February 1881. He was the fourth and youngest son of Vangal Thiruvenkatachari (1837–1934) a rich and powerful landlord.

Krishnamachari had his early education in Vangal and graduated from the Presidency College, Madras and Madras Law College. On completion of his education, Krishnamachari joined the Madras Civil Service in 1903 as Deputy Collector.

== Madras Civil Service ==
Krishnamachari served as Assistant Secretary to the Board of Revenue (Land Revenue) from 1913 to 1916 and was Under Secretary, Local and Municipal Government, from 1916 to 1919. He was a trustee to the Vizianagaram estate from 1919 to 1920. He was district collector and magistrate from 1920 to 1924 and officiating Secretary to the Law Department from 1924 to 1927. He went on foreign service as Diwna of Baroda State from February 1927.

== Diwan of Baroda ==
Krishnamachari was appointed Diwan of Baroda in 1927 and he served from 1927 to 1944. Krishnamachari has been one of the longest serving Diwans of Baroda. While serving as Diwan, Krishnamachari also served in the Committee of Ministers, Chamber of Indian Princes from 1941 to 1944.

While serving as Diwan of Baroda, Krishnamachari launched a massive rural reconstruction programme in the princely state.

== Prime Minister of Jaipur ==
Krishnamachari served as Prime Minister of Jaipur State from 1946 to 1949. he served in the Indian Finances Enquiry Committee from 1948 to 1949 and in Indian Fiscal Commission in 1949.

He was a delegate to all the three Round Table Conferences and was a delegate to the assembly of League of Nations during the years 1934 to 1936.

He was staunch in his support for the major Indian Princely states to join the Indian Union.

After Jaipur acceded to the Indian Union, Krishnamachari joined the Constituent Assembly on 28 April 1947 as a representative of Jaipur. In July 1947, following the decision to partition India, the Constituent Assembly modified its rules to have two vice-presidents, and there was a suggestion that one of them might be from the princely states. When the assembly did elect these vice-presidents on 16 July, there were only two nominations, so Krishnamachari (Jaipur) was selected unopposed, along with Dr. Harendra Coomar Mookerjee (West Bengal).

== Family ==
Krishnamachari married Rangammal on 26 April 1895. The couple had three sons and two daughters, one of whom was V. K. Thiruvenkatachari (1904–1984).

== Honours ==
Krishnamachari was made a Knight Bachelor in 1933. In 1926, he was invested as a Companion of the Order of the Indian Empire (CIE) and in 1936, a Knight Commander of the Order of the Indian Empire (KCIE). In 1946, he was invested as a Knight Commander of the Order of the Star of India (KCSI).

== Works ==
- V. T. Krishnamachari (1949). Speeches of V. T. Krishnamachari, Diwan, Jaipur State. Information Bureau.
- V. T. Krishnamachari (1952). Report on Indian and State Administrative Services and Problems of District Administration. Government of India.
- V. T. Krishnamachari (1958). Community Development in India. Government of India.
- V. T. Krishnamachari (1959). Planned Development and Efficient Administration. Government of India.
- V. T. Krishnamachari (1961). Planning in India. Orient Longman.
