= Punjaipugalur =

Punjai Pugalur
- Town
- Location in Tamil Nadu, India
- Coordinates: 11°05′N 78°01′E
- Country: India
- State: Tamil Nadu
- District: Karur

Government
  - Type: Municipality
  - Body: Punjai Pugalur Municipality

Population (2011)
  - Total: 23,408
  - Density: 936.3/km^{2} (2,425/sq mi)
- Time zone: UTC+5:30 (IST)
- Postal code: 639113
- Website: https://www.tnurbantree.tn.gov.in/pugalur/

Punjai Pugalur is a Municipality in Karur district in the Indian state of Tamil Nadu.

== Demographics ==
At the 2011 India census, Punjai Pugalur had a population of 23,408 (males 49%, females 51%). Punjaipugalur had a literacy rate of 83.3%, compared to the national literacy rate of 74.04%. Male literacy was 91%, and female literacy 76%. 10% of the population was under 6 years of age.
