= P. Kamaraj =

Indian politician

P. Kamaraj was elected to the Tamil Nadu Legislative Assembly from the Krishnarayapuram constituency in the 2006 election. He was a candidate of the Dravida Munnetra Kazhagam (DMK) party.
