= P. M. Thangavelraj =

Indian politician

P. M. Thangavelraj is an Indian politician and former Member of the Legislative Assembly of Tamil Nadu. He was elected to the Tamil Nadu legislative assembly from Krishnarayapuram constituency as an Indian National Congress (Indira) candidate in 1980 election and 1984 election.

== Electoral performance ==
=== Tamil Nadu Legislative Assembly Elections Contested ===
Election	Constituency	Party	Result	Vote %	Opposition Candidate	Opposition Party	Opposition vote %
1971	Krishnarayapuram	INC	Lost	44.15	P. Soundarapandian	DMK	55.03
1977	Krishnarayapuram	INC	Lost	31.73	P. Soundarapandian	AIADMK	32.59
1980	Krishnarayapuram	INC	Won	55.33	O. Rengaraju	AIADMK	43.86
1984	Krishnarayapuram	INC	Won	70.40	K. Krishnan	DMK	27.35
