= Mayanur (Karur) =

- Town
- Mayanoor
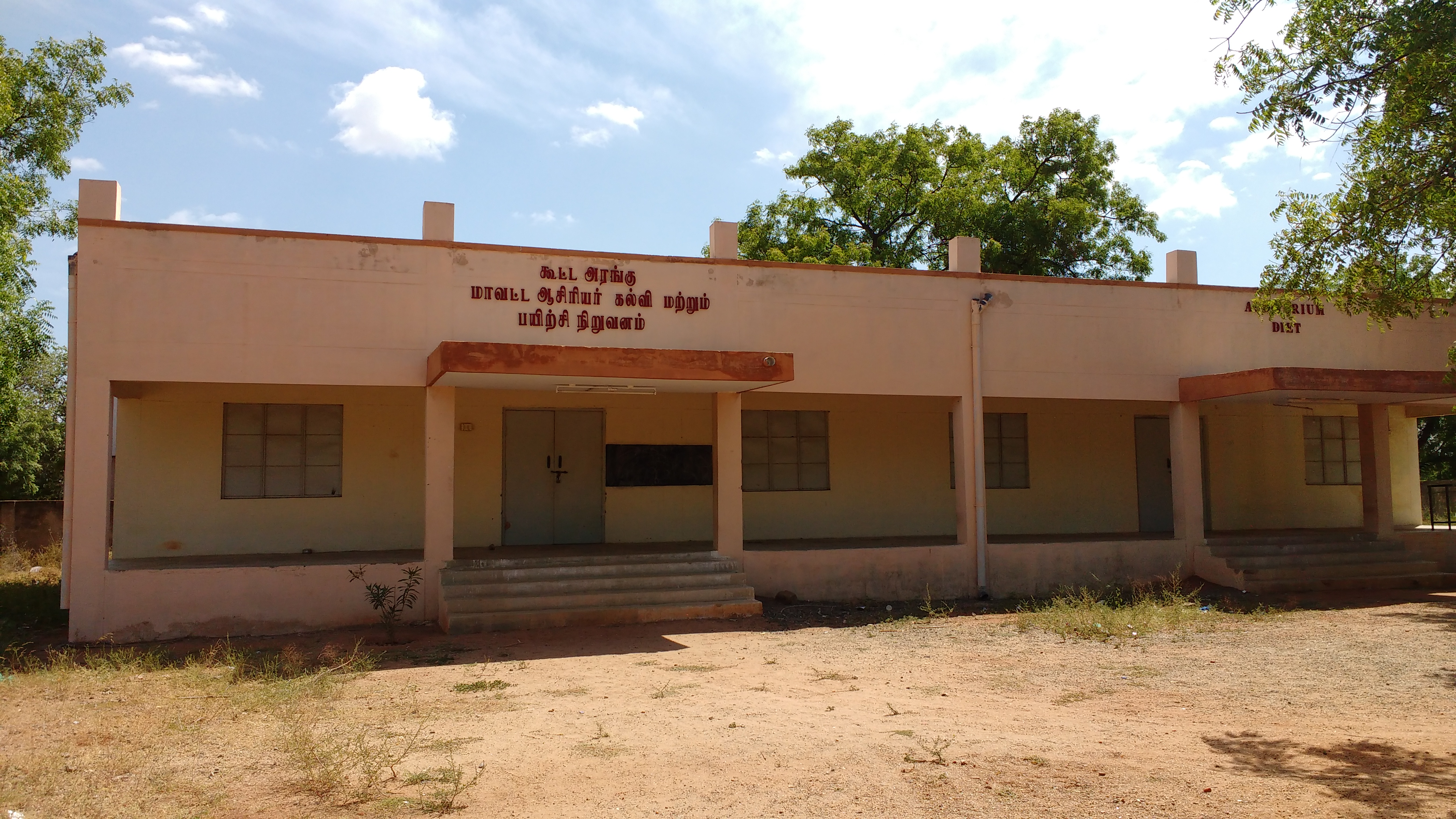

- Location in Tamil Nadu, India Mayanur (India)
- Coordinates: 10°54′20″N 78°09′59″E
- Country: India
- State: Tamil Nadu
- District: Karur

Languages
  - Official: Kongu Tamil
- Time zone: UTC+5:30 (IST)

Mayanur is a small town situated in the Karur district in Tamil Nadu, India. It is located on the banks of the Kaveri river and on Karur–Trichy National Highway.

According to tradition, Mayanur is believed to be a place where the ancient Chera, Chola, and Pandya dynasties intersected, marked by the Madukkarai Wall fortification.

== Etymology ==
The name Mayanur is derived from the Tamil word maiyam (or mayanam), which means "centre". It is believed to have been at the intersection of ancient kingdoms, and it is now located in the middle of Tamil Nadu state in South India.

== Geography ==
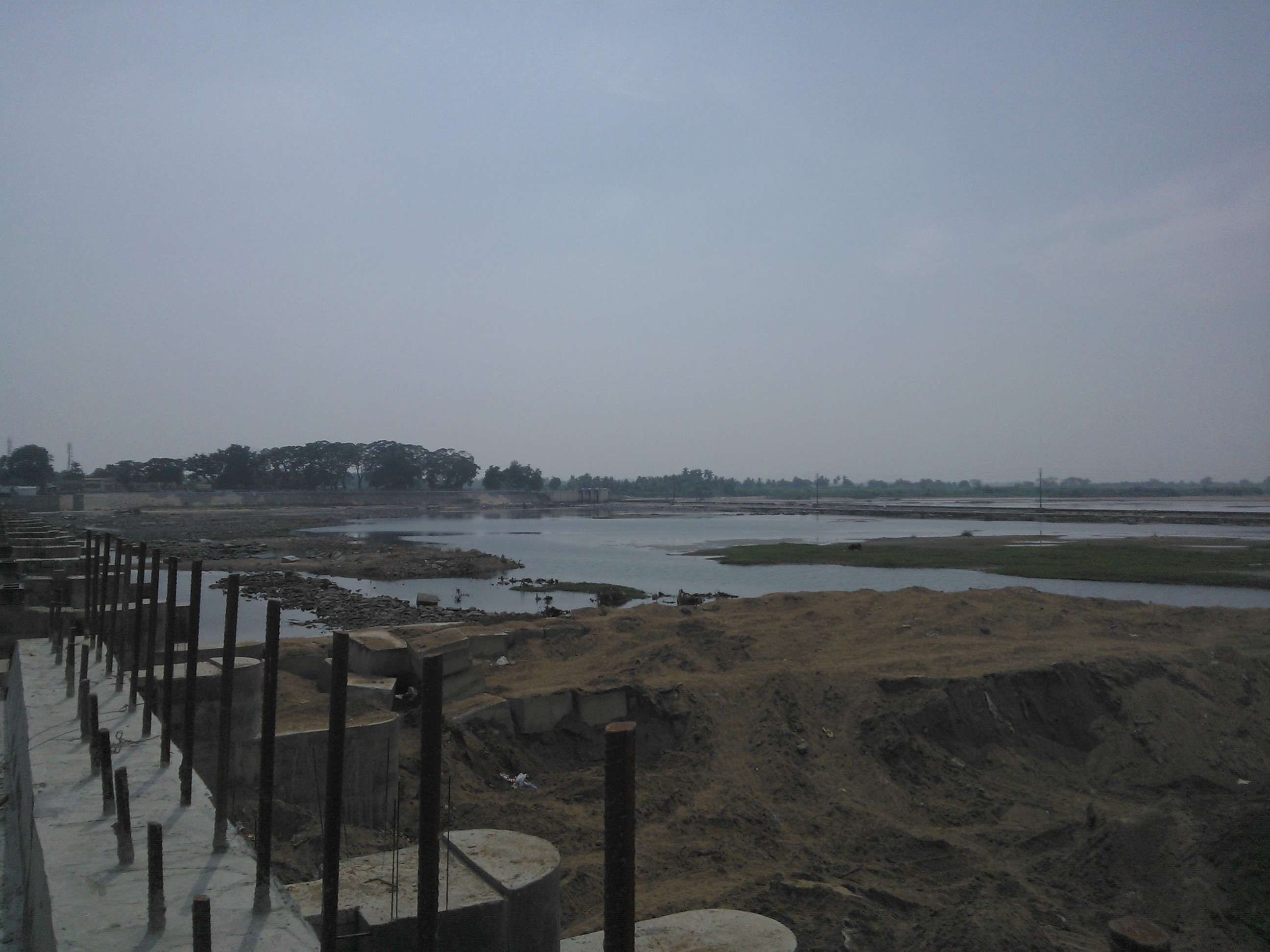
The Kaveri river as seen from Mayanur.

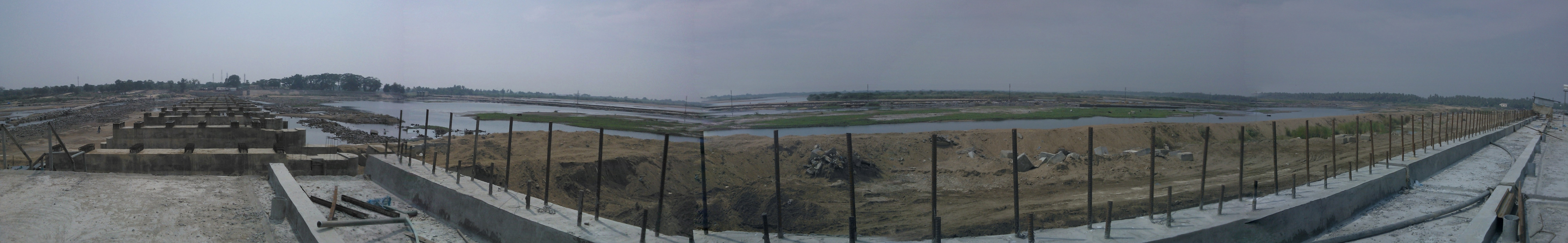
Panoramic view from the old dam

Mayanur is situated in the Kaveri river basin in the Tamil Nadu plains. The Kaveri River flows through Mayanur's northern side. A check dam was constructed across the river for flood control and irrigation.

Mayanur is 20 kilometers (12.4 miles) from the district administrative capital, Karur, and 21 kilometers (13 miles) from Kulithalai. Mayanur covers an area of 9.29 km^{2} (3.59 sq mi) and has five sub-divisions: Kaspa Mayanur, Keela Mayanur, Pudhu Street, Mela Mayanur, and Kilinjanatham. It had a population of 4,846 in 2020.

== Temples and festivals ==
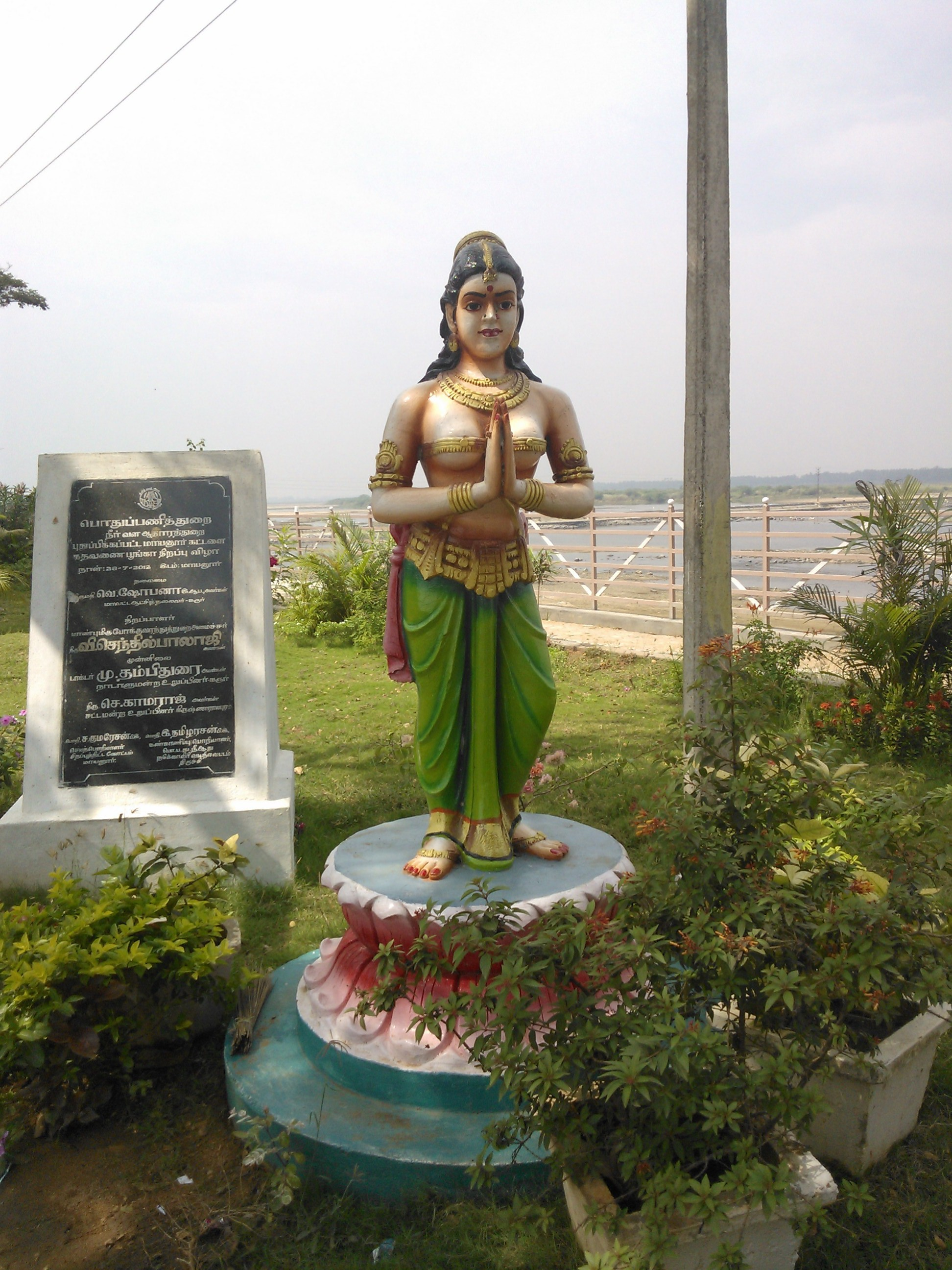
Sellandiamman (local temple deity)

Sri Sellandiamman Temple is one of the most ancient and historical locations in Mayanur. The temple deity is known as Sellandiamman, and its sculpture within the shrine has a slight bend in its neck. This matches the slightly off-line position of the main center of the temple with the path of its main entrance, and it is locally believed that the deity's neck is bent to facilitate its view of the Kaveri river. This temple name is mentioned many times in the ancient folk legend, Ponnar-Sankar.

Other temples include தானாய் வளர்ந்த மாரியம்மன் (Tāṉāy vaḷarnta māriyam'maṉ), திரு மாரியம்மன் (Tiru māriyam'maṉ) Sri Mariamman Temple, and Kilinjanatham Mariamman temple which is also called ஆதி மாரியம்மன் (Āti māriyam'maṉ). Sri Sannasi Appan Temple is located in Mettu Thiruckampuliyur, 2 km from Mayanur.

Aadi-Perukku is a festival that is celebrated on the banks of the Kaveri River. It is a Tamizhar festival celebrated on the 18th day of the Tamizh month of Adi (Tamil: ஆடி மாதம்; mid-July to mid-August). The festival pays tribute to water's life-sustaining properties.

During April or May, a five-day festival is celebrated.

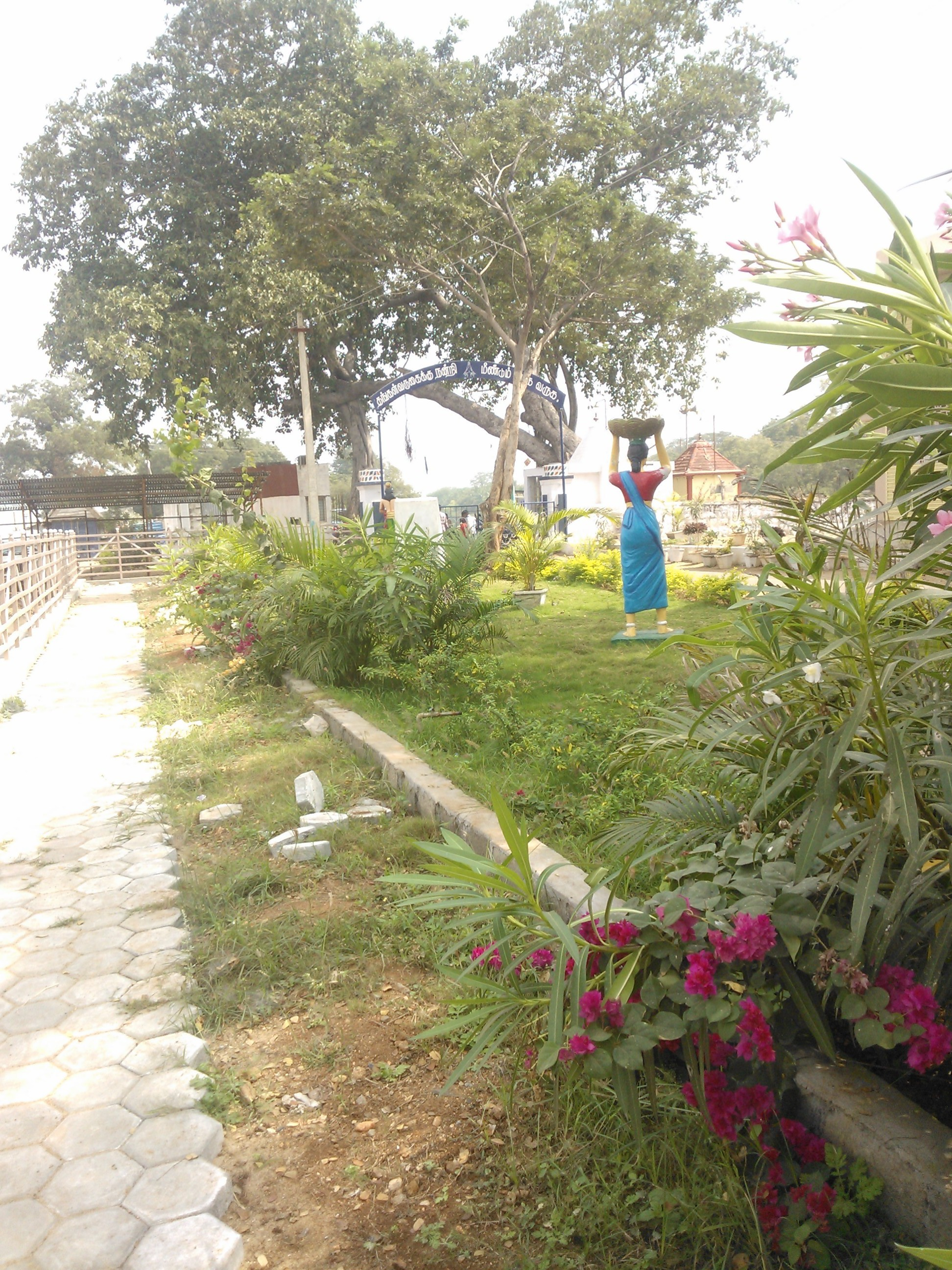
Greeny Park

== Economy ==
Mayanur's economy mainly consists of fishing, which is its biggest export to nearby districts and states, and tourism.

=== Industry ===
Mayanur is a small industrial hub and is home to many small and medium-sized manufacturing industries such as Karur KCP packaging Ltd, Fenner India Textiles, Ltd., and Muthu Spinning Mills Ltd.

TANCEM (Tamil Nadu Cement Corporation) once had a Mayanur factory which produced commercial asbestos sheets and pipes from 1983 until 2001. Although a high-revenue industry, the factory was shut down due to political decisions.

=== Markets ===
There are numerous provisional, grocery, garland shops, and multi-product stores, and a weekly vegetable and multi-product rural market.

== Transportation ==
Mayanur is located on the Karur–Trichy National Highway (NH-37). The Mayanur railway station is on two broad-gauge lines and is a stopping point for most trains. High-frequency bus service is available from Karur and Trichchirappalli.

== Education ==
Private and public schools are available with instruction in English and Tamizh. DIET-Mayanur (District Institute of Education and Training) has its main campus in Mayanur, and is among the higher-ranked government teacher training institutes.
