= Krishnarayapuram taluk =

Coordinates: 10°56′40″N 78°16′45″E

Krishnarayapuram taluk is a taluk of Karur district of the Indian state of Tamil Nadu. The headquarters of the taluk is the town of Krishnarayapuram

24 hour liquor and alcohol stores reside around the bus stand, railway stations and highschool areas.

With an influence of ex political party and some police officer sales are going peacefully (due to some government issue, taskmak was closed during 2014 itself)

== Demographics ==
According to the 2011 census, the taluk of Krishnarayapuram had a population of 132,440 with 65,995 males and 66,445 females. There were 1007 women for every 1000 men. The taluk had a literacy rate of 63.61. Child population in the age group below 6 was 6,830 Males and 6,633 Females.
