= Thogaimalai block =

Thogaimalai block is a revenue block in the Karur district of Tamil Nadu, India. It has a total of 20 panchayat villages.
