= Nangavaram Sri Sundareshwarar temple =

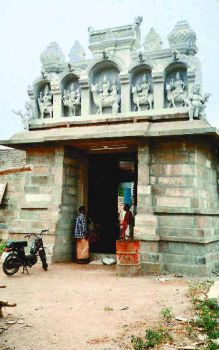

Sri Sundareswarar temple, situated at Nangavaram, 20 kilometres off Tiruchirapalli, is more than 1,000 years old.

Built between 975 and 1000 AD, the temple is the abode of Lord Sundareswarar believed to be a powerful deity and munificent protector.

The temple's story (Sthalapuranam) dates back to the times of Arinjikai Cholan (Rajaraja Cholan's forefather), whose daughter Varuguna Nangai built the magnificent temple. She married Maravan Bhoothy of the Errakavel clan.

Since she had built the temple for her husband's well-being, it was then called `Maravaneeswaram.'

And since Varguna Nangai established the temple and also the settlement around the temple, the village came to be known as Nangaikudi, which in due course became Nangaipuram and Nangavaram. The sthalapuranam also gave the other connotation for the village name Nangavaram — the place where the Lord blessed the Nangai (lady) with a boon (varam).

The front portion of the temple is dedicated to Lord Akhandeshwara, A saint who traveled from the state of Odisha and attained Samadhi somewhere close to the current temple area.

Alternate version of temple's story (SthalaPuranam):

An alternate version of the sthalapuranam states that Varuna Nangai was born with a horse face and when King Arinjikai Cholan prayed to Lord Shiva for her recovery, He appeared in his dream and informed him about the great saint Akhandeshwara. Lord Shiva advised the Chola that he should build a temple once Akhandeshwara attained Samadhi which would help Varuna Nangai to get a human face. In the meantime, Varuna Nangai continued to pray to Lord Shiva, once her father told her about his dream. The dreams of the Chola king came true with Nangai attaining a human face after Lord Akandeshwara attained Samadhi and the Chola king built the temple for Lord Shiva (as Sri Sundareshwarar) and dedicated a sannidhanam in the front portion of temple in Saint Akhandeshwars's honor. Since Shiva gave a boon or Varam to Nangai to restore her face coinciding with Akhandeshwarar attaining Samadhi, this village is known as Nangai - Varam or Nangavaram.

== See also ==
- Nangavaram
- Karur
- Shiva
- Tiruchirapalli
