= P. Soundarapandian =

Indian politician

Member of the Legislative Assembly
- In office 1967–1980
- Preceded by: Constituency Established
- Succeeded by: P. M. Thangavelraj
- Constituency: Krishnarayapuram

Personal details
- Party: All India Anna Dravida Munnetra Kazhagam
- Other political affiliations: Dravida Munnetra Kazhagam
- Religion: Hinduism

P. Soundrapandian was an Indian politician and former Member of the Legislative Assembly of Tamil Nadu. He was elected to the Tamil Nadu legislative assembly as a Dravida Munnetra Kazhagam candidate from Krishnarayapuram constituency in 1967 and 1971 elections, and as an Anna Dravida Munnetra Kazhagam candidate in 1977 election.

== Electoral performance ==
=== Tamil Nadu Legislative Assembly Elections Contested ===
Election	Constituency	Party	Result	Vote %	Opposition Candidate	Opposition Party	Opposition vote %
1967	Krishnarayapuram	DMK	Won	48.72	T. V. Sannasi	INC	44.37
1971	Krishnarayapuram	DMK	Won	55.03	P. M. Thangavelraj	INC	44.15
1977	Krishnarayapuram	AIADMK	Won	32.59	P. M. Thangavelraj	INC	31.73
