= K. Sivagama Sundari =

Indian politician

Member of the Tamil Nadu Legislative Assembly
- Incumbent
- Assumed office 12 May 2021
- Preceded by: Muthukumar
- Succeeded by: M. Geetha
- Constituency: Krishnarayapuram

Personal details
- Party: Dravida Munnetra Kazhagam

K. Sivagama Sundari is an Indian politician who is a Member of Legislative Assembly of Tamil Nadu. He was elected from Krishnarayapuram as a Dravida Munnetra Kazhagam candidate in 2021.

== Elections contested ==
| Election | Constituency | Party | Result | Vote % | Runner-up | Runner-up Party | Runner-up vote % | Ref. |
|---|---|---|---|---|---|---|---|---|
| 2021 Tamil Nadu Legislative Assembly election | Krishnarayapuram | DMK | Won | 53.72% | Muthukumar | ADMK | 36.12% | |
