= Krishnarayapuram Assembly constituency =

One of the 234 State Legislative Assembly Constituencies in Tamil Nadu, in India

Coordinates: 10°56′40″N 78°16′45″E

Krishnarayapuram
- Constituency No. 136 for the Tamil Nadu Legislative Assembly

Constituency details
- Country: India
- Region: South India
- State: Tamil Nadu
- District: Karur
- Lok Sabha constituency: Karur
- Established: 1967
- Total electors: 2,03,090
- Reservation: SC

Member of Legislative Assembly
- 17th Tamil Nadu Legislative Assembly
- Incumbent Sathya.M
- Party: TVK
- Elected year: 2026

Krishnarayapuram is a state assembly constituency in Karur district in Tamil Nadu. Its State Assembly Constituency number is 136. It comes under Karur Lok Sabha constituency for national elections. It is a Scheduled Caste reserved constituency. Most successful party: ADMK (seven times). It is one of the 234 State Legislative Assembly Constituencies in Tamil Nadu, in India.

== Members of Legislative Assembly ==
| Year | Member | Political party |
Madras State
| 1967 | P. Soundrapandian | Dravida Munnetra Kazhagam |
Tamil Nadu
| 1971 | P. Soundarapandiyan | Dravida Munnetra Kazhagam |
| 1977 | P. Soundarapandiyan | All India Anna Dravida Munnetra Kazhagam |
| 1980 | P. M. Thangavelraj | Indian National Congress |
| 1984 | P. M. Thangavelraj | Indian National Congress |
| 1989 | A. Arivalagan | All India Anna Dravida Munnetra Kazhagam |
| 1991 | A. Arivalagan | All India Anna Dravida Munnetra Kazhagam |
| 1996 | S. Nagarathinam | Dravida Munnetra Kazhagam |
| 2001 | R. Sasikala | All India Anna Dravida Munnetra Kazhagam |
| 2006 | P. Kamaraj | Dravida Munnetra Kazhagam |
| 2011 | S. Kamaraj | All India Anna Dravida Munnetra Kazhagam |
| 2016 | M. Geetha | All India Anna Dravida Munnetra Kazhagam |
| 2021 | K. Sivagama Sundari | Dravida Munnetra Kazhagam |
| 2026 | Sathya M. | Tamilaga Vettri Kazhagam |

== Election results ==
Vote share of winning candidates
| 2026 | 32.94% |
| 2021 | 53.72% |
| 2016 | 49.82% |
| 2011 | 54.81% |
| 2006 | 46.33% |
| 2001 | 55.09% |
| 1996 | 50.35% |
| 1991 | 76.04% |
| 1989 | 40.57% |
| 1984 | 70.40% |
| 1980 | 55.33% |
| 1977 | 32.59% |
| 1971 | 55.03% |
| 1967 | 48.72% |

=== 2026 ===
2026 Tamil Nadu Legislative Assembly election: Krishnarayapuram
| Party | Candidate | Votes | % | ±% |
|---|---|---|---|---|
| TVK | Sathya.M | 62,378 | 32.94 | New |
| AIADMK | Dr. Dhivya.S | 58,875 | 31.09 | ▼5.03 |
| DMK | Raja.C.K | 57,292 | 30.26 | ▼23.46 |
| NTK | Sathiya.V | 6,102 | 3.22 | ▼2.18 |
| NOTA | NOTA | 525 | 0.28 | ▼0.37 |
| Independent | Parameswaran.M | 376 | 0.20 | New |
| BSP | Gomathi.M | 306 | 0.16 | New |
| Independent | Sasikumar.M | 306 | 0.16 | New |
| Independent | Manickavel.R | 267 | 0.14 | New |
| Independent | Naveenth.M | 257 | 0.14 | New |
| Naadaalum Makkal Katchi | Balsamy.B | 230 | 0.12 | New |
| Independent | Prasanth.D | 228 | 0.12 | New |
| Independent | Sakthivel.A | 226 | 0.12 | New |
| Independent | Senthil.P.M | 212 | 0.11 | New |
| Independent | Selvakumar.S | 205 | 0.11 | New |
| Independent | Ganesan.P | 172 | 0.09 | New |
| Independent | Chelladurai.M | 171 | 0.09 | New |
| TVK | Saravanan.V | 167 | 0.09 | New |
| Independent | Murugan.S | 165 | 0.09 | New |
| Independent | Dinesh Kumar.A | 123 | 0.06 | New |
| Independent | Vimalraj.S | 121 | 0.06 | New |
| Ganasangam Party of India | Soundrapandian.S | 118 | 0.06 | New |
| Independent | Dinesh Kumar.N | 116 | 0.06 | New |
| Independent | Muruganandham.P.K | 92 | 0.05 | New |
| Samaniya Makkal Nala Katchi | Rajaguru.M | 79 | 0.04 | New |
| Independent | Baby.P | 71 | 0.04 | New |
| Independent | Indragandhi.P | 68 | 0.04 | New |
| Independent | Mahamuni.A | 64 | 0.03 | New |
| Independent | Porselvan.B.S | 45 | 0.02 | New |
| Margin of victory | | 3,503 | 1.85 | ▼15.75 |
| Turnout | | 1,89,357 | 93.24 | ▲8.84 |
| Registered electors | | 2,03,090 | | ▼9,847 |
| TVK gain from DMK | | Swing | ▲32.94 | |

=== 2021 ===
2021 Tamil Nadu Legislative Assembly election: Krishnarayapuram
| Party | Candidate | Votes | % | ±% |
|---|---|---|---|---|
| DMK | K. Sivagama Sundari | 96,540 | 53.72% | New |
| AIADMK | Muthukumar | 64,915 | 36.12% | −13.7 |
| NTK | R. Ilakiya | 9,706 | 5.40% | +4.2 |
| DMDK | M. Kathirvel | 1,946 | 1.08% | New |
| MNM | V. Saravanan | 1,848 | 1.03% | New |
| NOTA | NOTA | 1,177 | 0.65% | −2.16 |
| Margin of victory | | 31,625 | 17.60% | −3.35% |
| Turnout | | 1,79,725 | 84.40% | 1.39% |
| Rejected ballots | | 308 | 0.17% | |
| Registered electors | | 2,12,937 | | |
| DMK gain from AIADMK | | Swing | 3.89% | |

=== 2016 ===
2016 Tamil Nadu Legislative Assembly election: Krishnarayapuram
| Party | Candidate | Votes | % | ±% |
|---|---|---|---|---|
| AIADMK | M. Geetha | 83,977 | 49.82% | −4.99 |
| PT | V. K. Aiyyar | 48,676 | 28.88% | New |
| TMC(M) | K. Sivanantham | 10,043 | 5.96% | New |
| BJP | P. Naveenkumar | 5,673 | 3.37% | +2.84 |
| Independent | M. Pagalavan | 5,153 | 3.06% | New |
| NOTA | NOTA | 4,742 | 2.81% | New |
| NTK | P. Thavamani | 2,024 | 1.20% | New |
| KMDK | M. Murugan | 1,562 | 0.93% | New |
| Independent | C. Sathis Kumar | 1,401 | 0.83% | New |
| Independent | L. Elavalagan | 1,385 | 0.82% | New |
| PMK | M. Pandiyan | 1,327 | 0.79% | New |
| Margin of victory | | 35,301 | 20.94% | 6.10% |
| Turnout | | 1,68,559 | 83.01% | −3.70% |
| Registered electors | | 2,03,049 | | |
| AIADMK hold | | Swing | -4.99% | |

=== 2011 ===
2011 Tamil Nadu Legislative Assembly election: Krishnarayapuram
| Party | Candidate | Votes | % | ±% |
|---|---|---|---|---|
| AIADMK | S. Kamaraj | 83,145 | 54.81% | +15.57 |
| DMK | P. Kamaraj | 60,636 | 39.97% | −6.36 |
| Independent | V. Senthilkumar | 2,300 | 1.52% | New |
| Independent | K. Sudhakar | 1,194 | 0.79% | New |
| Independent | P. Ganesan | 1,093 | 0.72% | New |
| BSP | K. Sangan | 832 | 0.55% | −0.3 |
| BJP | C. Subramaniam | 801 | 0.53% | −0.27 |
| Margin of victory | | 22,509 | 14.84% | 7.75% |
| Turnout | | 1,51,699 | 86.71% | 8.60% |
| Registered electors | | 1,74,944 | | |
| AIADMK gain from DMK | | Swing | 8.48% | |

=== 2006 ===
2006 Tamil Nadu Legislative Assembly election: Krishnarayapuram
| Party | Candidate | Votes | % | ±% |
|---|---|---|---|---|
| DMK | P. Kamaraj | 58,394 | 46.33% | +9.77 |
| AIADMK | R. Sasikala | 49,460 | 39.24% | −15.86 |
| DMDK | D. Murugan | 9,728 | 7.72% | New |
| Independent | M. Leelavathi | 3,903 | 3.10% | New |
| Independent | N. Maruthaveeran | 1,168 | 0.93% | New |
| BSP | V. Sivakami | 1,065 | 0.84% | New |
| BJP | A. Sivasubramanian | 1,009 | 0.80% | New |
| Margin of victory | | 8,934 | 7.09% | −11.45% |
| Turnout | | 1,26,049 | 78.11% | 12.31% |
| Registered electors | | 1,61,374 | | |
| DMK gain from AIADMK | | Swing | -8.77% | |

=== 2001 ===
2001 Tamil Nadu Legislative Assembly election: Krishnarayapuram
| Party | Candidate | Votes | % | ±% |
|---|---|---|---|---|
| AIADMK | R. Sasikala | 64,046 | 55.09% | +18.01 |
| DMK | S. Periyasamy | 42,497 | 36.56% | −13.79 |
| MDMK | P. Rajendran | 4,380 | 3.77% | New |
| Independent | V. Rengasamy | 2,576 | 2.22% | New |
| Independent | R. Raju | 988 | 0.85% | New |
| Independent | R. Raju | 698 | 0.60% | New |
| Thaayaga Makkal Katchi | P. Perumal | 667 | 0.57% | New |
| Margin of victory | | 21,549 | 18.54% | 5.28% |
| Turnout | | 1,16,247 | 65.80% | −5.33% |
| Registered electors | | 1,76,754 | | |
| AIADMK gain from DMK | | Swing | 4.75% | |

=== 1996 ===
1996 Tamil Nadu Legislative Assembly election: Krishnarayapuram
| Party | Candidate | Votes | % | ±% |
|---|---|---|---|---|
| DMK | S. Nagarathinam | 57,638 | 50.35% | +27.5 |
| AIADMK | A. Arivalagan | 42,461 | 37.09% | −38.95 |
| CPI(M) | S. Thirunavukkarasu | 6,442 | 5.63% | New |
| AIIC(T) | T. V. Ambalavanan | 5,886 | 5.14% | New |
| Independent | P. Ramachandran | 797 | 0.70% | New |
| JP | K. Poosaimani | 636 | 0.56% | New |
| Margin of victory | | 15,177 | 13.26% | −39.94% |
| Turnout | | 1,14,484 | 71.13% | 5.40% |
| Registered electors | | 1,70,739 | | |
| DMK gain from AIADMK | | Swing | -25.70% | |

=== 1991 ===
1991 Tamil Nadu Legislative Assembly election: Krishnarayapuram
| Party | Candidate | Votes | % | ±% |
|---|---|---|---|---|
| AIADMK | A. Arivalagan | 80,676 | 76.04% | +35.47 |
| DMK | R. Natarajan | 24,240 | 22.85% | −7.78 |
| Margin of victory | | 56,436 | 53.19% | 43.25% |
| Turnout | | 1,06,094 | 65.74% | −7.65% |
| Registered electors | | 1,65,027 | | |
| AIADMK hold | | Swing | 35.47% | |

=== 1989 ===
1989 Tamil Nadu Legislative Assembly election: Krishnarayapuram
| Party | Candidate | Votes | % | ±% |
|---|---|---|---|---|
| AIADMK | A. Arivalagan | 43,574 | 40.57% | New |
| DMK | S. Masimali | 32,890 | 30.63% | +3.28 |
| INC | T. Pushpa | 23,017 | 21.43% | −48.97 |
| Independent | N. Dhanasekaran | 3,023 | 2.81% | New |
| Independent | V. Palaniappan | 2,491 | 2.32% | New |
| Independent | P. Soundarapandian | 1,077 | 1.00% | New |
| Independent | R. Rasu | 615 | 0.57% | New |
| Margin of victory | | 10,684 | 9.95% | −33.10% |
| Turnout | | 1,07,392 | 73.39% | −0.40% |
| Registered electors | | 1,49,407 | | |
| AIADMK gain from INC | | Swing | -29.82% | |

=== 1984 ===
1984 Tamil Nadu Legislative Assembly election: Krishnarayapuram
| Party | Candidate | Votes | % | ±% |
|---|---|---|---|---|
| INC | P. M. Thangavelraj | 65,928 | 70.40% | +15.07 |
| DMK | K. Krishnan | 25,613 | 27.35% | New |
| Independent | A. Sundaramurthy | 1,642 | 1.75% | New |
| Margin of victory | | 40,315 | 43.05% | 31.58% |
| Turnout | | 93,650 | 73.79% | 10.23% |
| Registered electors | | 1,33,860 | | |
| INC hold | | Swing | 15.07% | |

=== 1980 ===
1980 Tamil Nadu Legislative Assembly election: Krishnarayapuram
| Party | Candidate | Votes | % | ±% |
|---|---|---|---|---|
| INC | P. M. Thangavelraj | 43,623 | 55.33% | +23.6 |
| AIADMK | O. Rengaraju | 34,584 | 43.86% | +11.28 |
| Independent | M. Sannasi | 640 | 0.81% | New |
| Margin of victory | | 9,039 | 11.46% | 10.61% |
| Turnout | | 78,847 | 63.56% | 5.54% |
| Registered electors | | 1,25,588 | | |
| INC gain from AIADMK | | Swing | 22.74% | |

=== 1977 ===
1977 Tamil Nadu Legislative Assembly election: Krishnarayapuram
| Party | Candidate | Votes | % | ±% |
|---|---|---|---|---|
| AIADMK | P. Soundarapandian | 22,561 | 32.59% | New |
| INC | P. M. Thangavelraj | 21,967 | 31.73% | −12.42 |
| DMK | M. Aruna | 14,577 | 21.05% | −33.98 |
| JP | S. Kalavathy | 10,130 | 14.63% | New |
| Margin of victory | | 594 | 0.86% | −10.03% |
| Turnout | | 69,235 | 58.02% | −16.04% |
| Registered electors | | 1,20,967 | | |
| AIADMK gain from DMK | | Swing | -22.45% | |

=== 1971 ===
1971 Tamil Nadu Legislative Assembly election: Krishnarayapuram
| Party | Candidate | Votes | % | ±% |
|---|---|---|---|---|
| DMK | P. Soundarapandian | 36,177 | 55.03% | +6.31 |
| INC | P. M. Thangavelraj | 29,020 | 44.15% | −0.22 |
| Independent | P. Palaniyandi | 540 | 0.82% | New |
| Margin of victory | | 7,157 | 10.89% | 6.53% |
| Turnout | | 65,737 | 74.06% | 4.10% |
| Registered electors | | 94,293 | | |
| DMK hold | | Swing | 6.31% | |

=== 1967 ===
1967 Madras Legislative Assembly election: Krishnarayapuram
| Party | Candidate | Votes | % | ±% |
|---|---|---|---|---|
| DMK | P. Soundarapandian | 28,444 | 48.72% | New |
| INC | T. V. Sannasi | 25,903 | 44.37% | New |
| Independent | P. Palaniyandi | 2,873 | 4.92% | New |
| Independent | P. Mookan | 776 | 1.33% | New |
| Independent | A. Rayar | 385 | 0.66% | New |
| Margin of victory | | 2,541 | 4.35% | |
| Turnout | | 58,381 | 69.96% | |
| Registered electors | | 87,834 | | |
| DMK win (new seat) | | | | |
