= Inootrumangalam =

Inootrumangalam Inootrumangalam
- Village
- Location in Tamil Nadu, India Inootrumangalam (India)
- Coordinates: 10.940518°N 78.382344°E
- Country: India
- State: Tamil Nadu
- District: Karur
- Elevation: 86 m (282 ft)

Population (2001)
  - Total: 400

Languages
  - Official: Tamil
- Time zone: UTC+5:30 (IST)
- Vehicle registration: TN-47

Inootrumangalam is a village in Karur district in the Indian state of Tamil Nadu. The village is part of the K. Pettai panchayat and belongs to the Kulithalai sub district.

The recorded history of Inootrumangalam dates from medieval Chola period of the 9th century and has been part of the kingdoms of the medieval and later Cholas, later Pandyas and the Vijayanagar empire, prior to coming under British control and ultimately becoming a part of the Madras state. It is an agricultural village is located on the banks of the Cauvery river.
