= Nangavaram =

- Town
- Location in Tamil Nadu, India Nangavaram (India)
- Coordinates: 10°51′51″N 78°31′55″E
- Country: India
- State: Tamil Nadu
- District: Karur

Population (2001)
  - Total: 16,428

Languages
  - Official: Tamil
- Time zone: UTC+5:30 (IST)

Nangavaram is a panchayat town in Karur district in the Indian state of Tamil Nadu.

Nangavaram is also home to the famous Nangavaram Sri Sundareshwarar temple.

== Demographics ==
As of 2001 India census, Nangavaram had a population of 16,428. Males constitute 49% of the population and females 51%. Nangavaram has an average literacy rate of 60%, higher than the national average of 59.5%: male literacy is 71%, and female literacy is 50%. In Nangavaram, 12% of the population is under 6 years of age.
