= Kadavur taluk =

Kadavur taluk is a taluk of Karur district of the Indian state of Tamil Nadu. The headquarters of the taluk is the town of Thargampatti. There are 23 revenue villages under this taluk.

== Demographics ==
According to the 2011 census, the taluk of Kadavur had a population of 109,810 with 54,852 males and 54,958 females. There were 1002 women for every 1000 men. The taluk had a literacy rate of 57.85. Child population in the age group below 6 was 6,130 Males and 5,747 Females.
