= Manmangalam =

- Town
- Location in Tamil Nadu, India Manmangalam (India)
- Coordinates: 11.028°N 78.064°E
- Country: India
- State: Tamil Nadu
- Region: Kongu Nadu
- District: Karur
- Taluk: Manmangalam
- Elevation: 148 m (486 ft)

Population (2011)
  - Total: 6,068
- Time zone: UTC+5:30 (IST)
- PIN: 639006
- Vehicle registration: TN-

Manmangalam is a Town and Taluk in Tamil Nadu, India, in the Manmangalam created on 12 February 2014 by chief minister Dr. J. Jayalalitha through a TV conference from Chennai headquarters taluk of Karur district.

It is 9 km north of the district headquarters Karur, and 383 km from the state capital Chennai. Tamil is the local language.

== Transport ==
The nearest railway stations are at Moorthipalayam (4 km), Vangal (6 km), Karur junction (7 km) and Pugalur (9 km). The nearest airport is at Trichy (78 km).
