= P. J. Cholapuram =

- Town
- Location in Tamil Nadu, India
- Coordinates: 10°54′22″N 78°16′51″E
- Country: India
- State: Tamil Nadu
- District: Karur

Population (2016)
  - Total: 16,543

Languages
  - Official: Tamil
- Time zone: UTC+5:30 (IST)

P. J. Cholapuram is a panchayat town in Karur district in the Indian state of Tamil Nadu.

== Demographics ==
As of 2001 India census, P. J. Cholapuram had a population of 6543. Males constitute 50% of the population and females 50%. P. J. Cholapuram has an average literacy rate of 58%, lower than the national average of 59.5%: male literacy is 70%, and female literacy is 46%. In P. J. Cholapuram, 10% of the population is under 6 years of age.
