= Uppidamangalam =

- Panchayat town
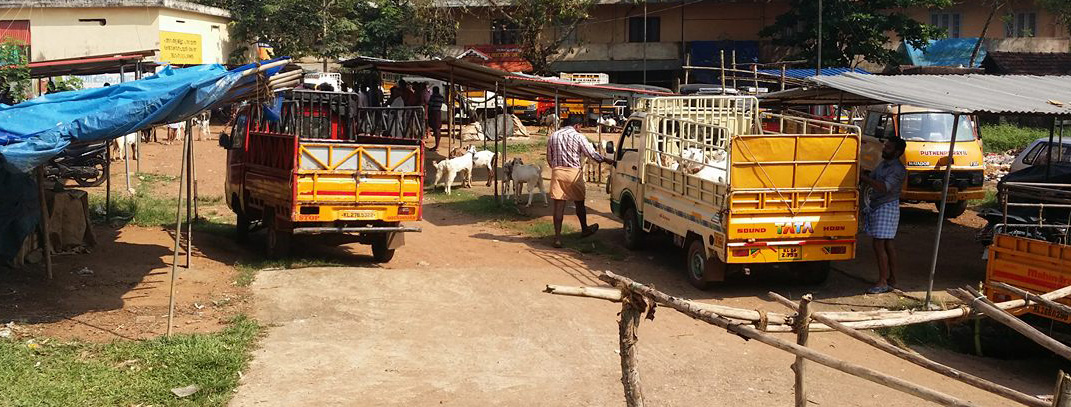

- Location in Tamil Nadu, India Uppidamangalam (India)
- Coordinates: 10°54′25″N 78°10′01″E
- Country: India
- State: Tamil Nadu
- District: Karur

Population (20011)
  - Total: 18,039

Languages
  - Official: Tamil
- Time zone: UTC+5:30 (IST)
- Postal code: 639114
- Vehicle registration: TN47

Uppidamangalam is a panchayat town in Karur district in the Indian state of Tamil Nadu.

== Demographics ==
According to the 2001 India census, the population is 10,039. Males constitute 50% of the population and females 50%. Uppidamangalam has an average literacy rate of 62%, higher than the national average of 59.5%: male literacy is 74%, and female literacy is 50%. In Uppidamangalam, 8% of the population is under 6 years of age.

== Economy ==
Uppidamangalam has Tamil Nadu's second largest cattle market. Its Sunday market attracts people from Kerala and Andhra Pradesh. Cattle breeding is a fast growing occupations in the area. Agriculture is prominent. Textiles and imports are major occupations. It is one of the fastest growing villages in the area.

== Geography ==
Uppidamangalam is approximately 12 km (7.5 mi) east of Karur city

== Health care ==
Village Government hospital is on the outskirts of Uppidamangalam. Private clinics and a pharmacy are available. Electronics shops, pest shops and tea shops are available.

== Education ==
Uppidamangalam is well known for its educational institutions. It offers higher and lower secondary Government schools.
