= K.Paramathy block =

K. Paramathi
- Small Town
- Location in Tamil Nadu, India K. Paramathi (India)
- Coordinates: 10.895°N 77.948°E
- Country: India
- State: Tamil Nadu
- District: Karur

Languages
  - Official: Kongu Tamil
- Time zone: UTC+5:30 (IST)
- Postal code: 639111
- Vehicle registration: TN47

K.Paramathy is a revenue block in the Karur district of Tamil Nadu, India. It has a total of 30 panchayat villages. K.Paramathi is a town in K.Paramathy Block. It is located 22 km towards west from District headquarters Karur. It is the Block headquarters.

== Transport ==
Karur Junction is major railway station 23 kilometres (14 mi) from K. Paramathi village.
