= Pallapatti, Karur =

Pallapatti
- Town
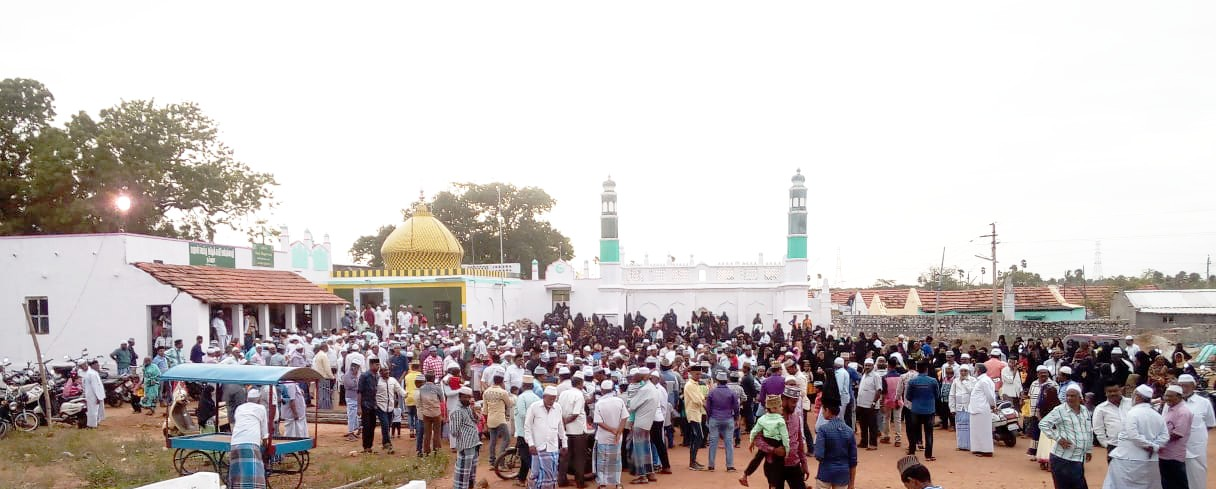
- Nickname: Palli-Ma-Nagar
- Location in Tamil Nadu, India Pallapatti (India)
- Coordinates: 10.731111°N 77.909722°E
- Country: India
- State: Tamil Nadu
- District: Karur

Government
  - Type: Municipality
  - Body: Pallapatti Municipality
- Elevation: 174 m (571 ft)

Population (2011)
  - Total: 30,624

Languages
  - Official: Tamil
- Time zone: UTC+5:30 (IST)
- PIN: 639205, 639207
- Telephone code: 04320
- Vehicle registration: TN-47

Pallapatti is one of the three municipalities in the Karur district of Tamil Nadu. The Pallapatti municipality is located near the Aravakurichi town. The local government is panchayat and has 27 ward members. The Nankaji River, a tributary of the Amaravathi River, flows near Pallapatti. It was declared a municipality by the Government of Tamil Nadu in January 2022. The first local body election for the municipality was held in February 2022, in which Munavarjan of the DMK was elected as the Mayor. A total of 31,233 voters are registered across the 27 wards. Business brands with roots in the town include BAWA Medicals, Maharaja Silks, and Lifestyle, which have expanded into retail businesses.

== Location ==
Pallapatti is accessible from the NH 44 connecting Dindigul and Karur. It is 47 km from Dindigul and 37 km southwest of Karur. The Pallapatti municipality is 7 km south of Aravakurichi.

== Population distribution ==
According to the 2011 census, the total population of Pallapatti Municipality, which consists of 18 wards and 7,426 houses, is 30,624. Of that, 15,069 (49%) are men and 15,555 (51%) are women. The sex ratio is 1032 females for every 1000 males. The literacy rate is 92.53%. Of the total population of Pallapatti, 3,471 are under the age of 6. The majority of the population in Pallapatti Municipality are Tamil-speaking Muslims (94.90%).

== Institutions ==
Notable institutions include Pallapatti Higher Secondary School, Uswathun Hasana Oriental Arabic School and College of Arts & Science, Crescent Matriculation School, Oxford Matriculation School, Venus Matriculation School, along with several other kindergarten and primary schools.

== Climate ==
The highest temperatures occur in early May to early June, about 34 °C (93 °F). Temperatures rarely exceed 38 °C (100 °F) for a few days. The average daily temperature during January is around 23 °C (73 °F), though the temperature rarely falls below 17 °C (63 °F). The average annual rainfall is about 855 mm (33.7 in). The town gets most of its seasonal rainfall from the north-east monsoon winds between late September and mid-November.

== Transport ==
Pallapatti is located between Karur and Dindigul.

There are frequent buses between Karur and Pallapatti, along with direct buses from Chennai to Pallapatti. Connectivity to major cities like Coimbatore, Trichy, Madurai, Salem, Vellore and Nagore is also available from Pallapatti.

The nearest railway stations are Karur and Dindigul. There are five trains from Chennai to Karur. Karur can be reached by Mangalore Mail from Chennai Egmore station and by Palani Express from Chennai Central station. All major trains going towards southern Tamil Nadu from Chennai stop in Dindigul railway station.

The nearest airports are Madurai Airport, Tiruchirappalli International Airport and Coimbatore Airport.

== Culture ==
Pallapatti's cultural identity shares a strong bond with the surrounding villages. For generations, the town has served as an important regional centre where people from nearby villages congregate for trade, commerce, education, healthcare, and other essential services.

The agricultural activities and local businesses of many neighboring villages are closely connected with the Pallapatti market. Farmers, traders, and entrepreneurs rely on the town as a key marketplace for exchanging goods, accessing services, and building economic opportunities.
