= Sathya M. =

Indian politician (born 1987)

Sathya M. (born 1987) is an Indian politician from Tamil Nadu. She is a Member of the Legislative Assembly from Krishnarayapuram Assembly constituency which is reserved for Scheduled Caste community in Karur district representing the Tamilaga Vettri Kazhagam.

Sathya is from Karur, Tamil Nadu. She is a postgraduate and works as a school principal.

Sathya made her electoral debut in April 2026 winning the 2026 Tamil Nadu Legislative Assembly election from Krishnarayapuram Assembly constituency representing the Tamilaga Vettri Kazhagam. She polled 62,378 votes and defeated her nearest rival, Dhivya. S. of the All India Anna Dravida Munnetra Kazhagam, by a margin of 3503 votes.
