= Aravakurichi =

- Town
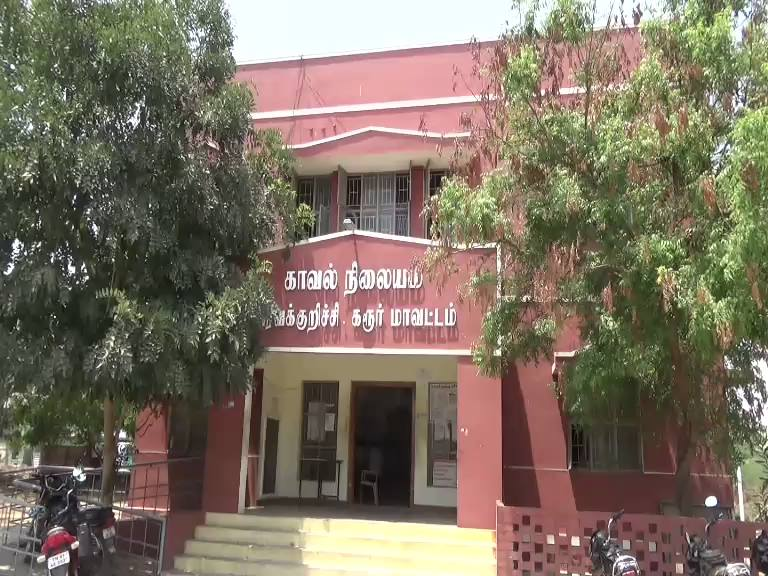

- Aravakurichi, Tamil Nadu
- Coordinates: 10.774700°N 77.909000°E
- Country: India
- State: Tamil Nadu
- District: Karur

Government
  - Type: Town Panchayat
  - Body: Aravakurichi Town Panchayat
- Elevation: 192 m (630 ft)

Population (2011)
  - Total: 12,413

Languages
  - Official: Tamil
- Time zone: UTC+5:30 (IST)
- PIN: 639201
- Telephone code: 04320
- Vehicle registration: TN-47

Aravakurichi is a panchayat town and a Taluk headquarters in Karur district in the state of Tamil Nadu, India. Aravakurichi is well known in Tamil Nadu as a major market for Moringa oleifera vegetable (commonly known as Drumstick). Aravakurichi is the headquarters of Aravakurichi taluk which consists of 40 revenue Villages.

== Geography ==
Aravakurichi is located at 10.77°N 77.92°E. and has an average elevation of 174 m (571 ft). The town is located off the Varnasi - Kanyakumari National Highway 7 (India). The time zone is IST (UTC+5:30).

=== Location ===
Aravakurichi is also a major lorry-stop for drivers on National Highway 7, a highway which connects Hyderabad, Bangalore, Salem, Madurai and Kanniyakumari. Aravakurichi was part of old Tiruchirappalli District until the 1980s and now become the major area of Karur district. Aravakurichi taluk forms the confluence point for the three old major undivided districts Tiruchirappalli, Coimbatore and Madurai during and before independence. Aravakurichi is a Town in Aravakurichi Block in Karur District of Tamil Nadu State, India. It is located 32 km towards South from District headquarters Karur. It is a Block headquarter.

Rajapuram ( 4 km ), Velambadi ( 6 km ), Modakkur East ( 6 km ), Thokkupatti ( 6 km ), Modakkur West ( 7 km ) are the nearby Villages to Aravakurichi. Aravakurichi is surrounded by Guziliamparai Block towards East, K.Paramathy Block towards North, Mulanur Block towards west, Thanthoni Block towards East .

Karur, Vellakoil, Punjaipugalur, Oddanchatram are the nearby Cities to Aravakurichi.

=== Rivers ===
- Nanganjii River ( Nal Kaasi River)
- Amaravathi River (4.km from Aravakurichi)
- Noyyal River (Anjur panjayath)
- Kudagu River

== Demographics ==
According to the 2001 India census, Aravakurichi is a taluk that has a population of 11,273. 50% of the population is male, and 50% is female. 55% of men are literate, compared to 45% of women. 9% of people are under the age of 6. The official language is Tamil

== Landmarks ==
Shiva Temple at Kovilur near Aravakurichi is more than 2000 years old. Both the Shiva and the Ambal shrines face east. This shivasthalam has been patronised by the kings of Pandiya Naadu and many rock cut inscriptions of Pandiya Period have been found in this temple.

Venjamangudalur Shiva temple is more than 1200 years old. This temple has a 5 tiered Rajagopuram. The presiding deity lord shiva is called as Vikriteswarar and the Ambal his consort is called as Vikritambika. Both the Shiva and the Ambal shrines face east. The main Lingam inside the sanctum sanctorum is 5 feet in height and the female deity's image is 2.5 feet in height. This shivasthalam has been patronised by the kings of Pandiya Naadu and many rock cut inscriptions of Pandiya Period have been found in this temple. There are shrines to the Panchalingams, Bhairavar, the 63 Nayanmars and others in this temple. The Theerthama is Vikrita Theertham. Located at Venjamangudalur near Aravakurichi, this temple is classified as one of the Kongu Naattu temples. Karuvoor Aanilai is another Shivastalam located nearby. The sanctum of this temple bears depictions of the 7 Thevara temples in Kongu Naadu. Legend has it that a hunter king by name Venchan is said to have worshipped Shiva here and hence the name Venchamaakoodal. Shiva is said to have appeared in the guise of an old priest and blessed Sundarar with gold. The king of Devaas, Indiran, is said to have worshipped the Lingam here to get rid of his sins. The temple is located on the east bank of river Kudaganaaru.

Pungampadi Shiva Temple Name of Arulmigu meenatchi amman Chokkanathar temple. 3 inscriptions here, it may constructed before 500 years.

Rooster duel or "Sevalkattu" is a particular attraction in Aravakurichi. Enthusiasts bring thousands of roosters to take part in the duels organised at Poolamvalasu and Kovilur near Aravakurichi which has gained significance as the venue. It received a tremendous response from enthusiastic growers and eager public. Roosters in red, tan, black and white _ reared especially for fight _ were brought from Karur, Coimbatore, Dindigul, Theni, Madurai, Tiruchi, Salem, Erode, Thanjavur, Tirupur, Tirunelveli and Kanyakumari districts as also from some areas in neighbouring Kerala.The rule of the game is simple – the winner takes it all, including the losing rooster which should be lucky to see the next dawn for, most of the losing roosters would be served up during dinner celebration of the victors the same day.

== Administration and politics ==
Aravakurichi (State Assembly Constituency) is part of Karur (Lok Sabha constituency).

=== Amenities ===
Aravakurichi Pin code is 639201 and postal head office is Aravakurichi .

== Economy ==
Aravakurichi is an agricultural marketplace and Taluk headquarters. Aravakurichi is India's major market for Moringa oleifera (a vegetable also known as "drumstick"). Aravakurichi is also a centre for agricultural motors, pumps, equipment and spares. Aravakurichi has been a great hit with hundreds of loads being transported to several States, including Maharashtra, Gujarat, Delhi, Rajasthan, Haryana, West Bengal, Orissa, Karnataka, Andhra Pradesh and Kerala. The Aravakurichi crop is famed for its taste and it attracts traders who come in hoards to buy the produce.more than 40,000 acres in the region and most of the crop raised in Aravakurichi area is brought to special drumstick shandies that are being temporarily established at Aravakurichi, Esanatham, Indra Nagar, Pallappatti, Andipattikottai and Malaikovilur from where traders from within the State and outside buy them in lorry loads and transport them to various destinations. The lots are bought following open tenders and packed in 200 kg bundles to be transported away. Around 25 lorry loads are being carted away a day from the region, traders aver.

== Transport ==
Aravakurichi is well connected with major cities like Karur, Dindigul, Tirupur, Coimbatore, Erode, Trichy, Salem, Madurai and Chennai. It have a bus stand in town and the region has a Tamil Nadu State Transport Corporation bus depot also.

- By bus: Karur to Dindigul Via NH 7 (30 km from Karur)
- Nearest railway junction: Karur - 30 km and Dindigul 48 km
- Nearest airport: Trichy (110 km), Coimbatore (120 km) and Madurai(128 km)

== Education ==
- Government Higher Secondary School - Aravakurichi
- Government Girls High School - Aravakurichi
- R C School - Aravakurichi
- Arumugam Academy Matriculation Higher Secondary School.
- BSP Matriculation Higher Secondary School
- Government Teacher Training Institute for Women in Chinna Dhara Puram (10 km).
- Valluvar arts and science college in seethappatti colony kodayur village.
- Kongu Hi-Tech Polytechnic College, Thadakoil.
