= Marudur, Karur =

Marudur
- Town
- Location in Tamil Nadu, India
- Coordinates: 10°54′02″N 78°26′48″E
- Country: India
- State: Tamil Nadu
- District: Karur

Population (2001)
  - Total: 10,205

Languages
  - Official: Tamil
- Time zone: UTC+5:30 (IST)

Marudur is a panchayat town in Karur district in the Indian state of Tamil Nadu.Mrs. Janaki ammal wife of mathematician Srinivasan Ramanujan hails from this village near to mardur railway station.

== Demographics ==
As of 2001 India census, Marudur in Karur District, Tamil Nadu, had a population of 10,205. Males constitute 49% of the population and females 51%. Marudur has an average literacy rate of 60%, higher than the national average of 59.5%: male literacy is 71%, and female literacy is 49%. In Marudur, 11% of the population is under 6 years of age.
