= Vangal =

Village in Tamil Nadu, India

Vangal is a village in the Karur district of the Indian state of Tamil Nadu. It is situated 80 km (50 mi) from Tiruchirappalli and 7 miles from Karur city. Vangal is also known as Vangal-Kuppuchipalayam and Vangal Palayur.

It is one of the biggest villages (Town Panchayat) on the bank of Kavery Delta region and the width of the river in Vangal is 2 km. Other side of the river is Mohanur.

Agriculture based farming communities around Vangal Panchayat is using Vangal as a Headquarters for transporting their agro products such as Rice, Banana, coconut, Ground nut, Vegetables and green. Recently commercial crops such as Mango, vanilla, beetle nuts also grown in the fields of the delta region.

Government Organisations in Vangal:

Primary School, Govt. Higher Secondary School for Boys, Govt. Higher Secondary School for Girls, Primary Health Centre, Private Doctors (general Physicians), Emergency clinic, Panchayat Office, Police Station, Railway Station, Public Bus Services, Taxi service etc.

Another group of agricultural farmers and horse traders from Kadambangurichi (Near Pugalore) have also settled in Vangal during 17th Century onwards. Their horse trading business involved to purchase horses from Madras Pattinam. They were also called as 'Mirasthar', a group of people have their surname/family name with the title 'Pattanathu' were also have hereditary links with Mirasthar. In 17th & 18th Centuries, those Mirasthars had owned large farm lands in and around Vangal and later the farms were sold to small scale agricultural farmers for the plantation of Paddy, Sugarcane, Turmeric, Chilli, Brinjal, Plantain, coconut etc...

People born in Vangal Village or have hereditary links with Vangal:

V. T. Krishnamachari

Vangal A.Manikandan

Vangal A.Manikandan

Vangal Ramesh

Vangal Uma

Vangal Muthukumar

Known places in the Village:

Kaveri River

Vangal Shree Vangalamman Temple, Malayalam Karuppannan Temple Karur

Mariamman Temple

Vangal Railway Station

Vangal Mosque

Eeshwaran Temple

Durgai Amman Temple

Pillaiar Temple

Well Known Festivals in the Village:

Pongal Festival (3 days’ / Bike race / Kolam / small stage dramas / kids activities / JALLIKATTU soon!) - No religious restrictions

Ramzan (30 days - evening - Free Rice Porridge served in the mosque for villagers) - No religious restrictions

Recently People from other parts of Tamil Nadu have started to move to Vangal for employment, small businesses, etc. Even many parts of Tamil Nadu was hit by water scarcity, Vangal village does not meet any drinking water scarcity issues. Whereas agricultural farms and commercial crops are facing some challenges to thrive because water scarcity for irrigation. Sand mining in the Kaveri delta region is one of the main reason as the ground water level has gone below the critical levels. The farming community rely on the well water, where level of water is very low because of the water table has been disrupted by sand mining.

Vangal railway station (Code: VNGL) is a railway station situated in Vangal, Karur district in the Indian state of Tamil Nadu. The station is an intermediate station on the newly commissioned Salem Junction-Karur Junction line which became operational in May 2013. The station is operated by the Southern Railway zone of the Indian Railways and comes under the Salem railway division.

Vangal is a Village in Karur Taluk in Karur District of Tamil Nadu State, India. It is located 11 km towards North from District headquarters Karur. 9 km from Karur. 377 km from State capital Chennai. Vangal Pin code is 639116 and postal head office is Vangal.

Villages near Vangal: Mooppars Nagar (1 km) Kuppuchipalayam (2 km), Koppampalayam (2 km), Odaiyur (2 km), Sinthayur (2 km), Mallampalayam (3 km)

This Place is in the border of the Karur District and Namakkal District. Namakkal District Mohanur is North towards this place .

Demographics of Vangal

Tamil is the Local Language here.

HOW TO REACH Vangal

By Rail

Karur Rail Way Station is the very nearby railway stations to Vangal. However Erode Jn Rail Way Station is major railway station 59 km near to Vangal

Colleges near Vangal

Aasee College of Education

Address: S.f.no.305/1; Pavithram; Karur--kovai Rd; Pavithram Post; Aravakkuruchi Taluk; Karur Dist;tami

V.S.B. Engineering College

Address: Karudayampalayam Post; Karur -- 639 111. Tamilnadu. India.

M. Kumaraswamy College of Engineering

Address: Thalavapalayam Karur. 639113

Ponkaliamman College of Education

Address: Thiruvalluvar Nagar A; Bye Pass Rd; Velayuthampalayam; Karur--639117

Schools in Vangal, Karur

Vangal Higher Secondary School

Vangal Higher Secondary School; Vangal; Tamil Nadu 639116; India

0.8 km distance

Panchayat Union Primary School

Mohanur; Tamil Nadu 637015; India

3.2 km distance

St.Mary s Matriculation School. Vangal.

Karur - Vangal - Nerur Road; Vangal; Tamil Nadu 639116; India

0.7 km distance

SRV EXCEL Matric Higher Secondary School

Vangal - Pugalur Rd; Koyilpalayam; Tamil Nadu 639116; India

3.5 km distance

Kongu Vellalar H.s, vennaimalai

Address : lakshmi narayana samuthram, karur, karur, Tamil Nadu . PIN- 639006, Post - Vengamedu

RASI NURSERY AND PRIMARY SCHOOL Five Road Karur

Address : Jawahar Bazaar, Five Road, Karur, Tamil Nadu, PIN-639001,

Rasamma High School, Vettamang

Address : vettamangalam (east), karur, karur, Tamil Nadu . PIN- 639117, Post - Velayuthampalayam

Sub Villages in Vangal

Nallakumarapalayam

Kattur

Odaiyur

Koppampalayam

Srinivasapuram

Marigoundampalayam

K.Velayuthampalayam

Melachakrapalayam

Ellaimedu

Keelachakrapalayam

keeraiyur

Bus Stops in Vangal, Karur

Vangal Bus Stop

Vangal - Pugalur Rd; Vangal; Tamil Nadu 639116; India

0.4 km distance

Agraharam Bus Stop

Vangal - Pugalur Rd; Vangal Agraharam; Tamil Nadu 639116; India

0.7 km distance

Sakkarapalayam Bus Stop

Vangal; Tamil Nadu 639116; India

0.8 km distance

Karuppampalayam Bus Stop

Karur; Tamil Nadu 639116; India

0.9 km distance

ATMs in Vangal, Karur

SBI ATM in Vangal

ICICI ATM in Vangal

Cinema Theaters in Vangal Kuppuchipalayam, Karur

Balasubramania Theatre

Nehru Nagar; Mohanur; Tamil Nadu 637015; India

3.9 km distance

Amutha Theatre

Thiruvikka Salai; Neelimedu; Karur; Tamil Nadu 639001; India

10.8 km distance

Kavithalaiya Theatre

Neelimedu; Karur; Tamil Nadu 639001; India

10.9 km distance

Kalaiarangam Theatre

75 Rathina Salai; Thiruvikka Salai; Neelimedu; Karur; Tamil Nadu 639001; India

10.9 km distance

Thinnappa Theatre

Madavilagam; Karur; Tamil Nadu; India

11.5 km distance

Temples in Vangal Kuppuchipalayam, Karur

BagavathiAmman Temple And Murugan Temple

Karuppampalayam; Tamil Nadu 639116; India

1.4 km distance

Sri Kamakshi Amman Temple

Vangal - Mohanur River Bridge; Tamil Nadu 639116; India

1.4 km distance

Hotels, Lodges in Vangal, Karur

KVS Complex

Mohanur; Tamil Nadu 637015; India

3.8 km distance

Sugar Mill Quarters

Salem sugar mill Quarters; India

4.5 km distance

Pon Vidya Mandir Hostel

Karur; Tamil Nadu 639116; India

6.9 km distance

Petrol Bunks in Vangal, Karur

Indian Oil Petrol Station

Vangal; Tamil Nadu 639116; India

0.7 km distance

Colleges in Vangal Kuppuchipalayam, Karur

SCSM Polytechnic College

SCSM Polytechnic College; Tamil Nadu 637015; India

5.1 km distance

Kongu Arts & Science College

Karur; Tamil Nadu 639006; India

9.6 km distance

CADD CENTRE; Karur.

Gowripuram E St; Gowripuram; Karur; Tamil Nadu 639001; India

12.0 km distance

CADDCENTRE

Gowripuram E St; Gowripuram; Karur; Tamil Nadu 639001; India

12.0 km distance

Jairam College of Education

Near Mahamaariyamman Temple; Thirugampuliur; Andankoil East; Tamil Nadu 639002; India

12.1 km distance

Near Cities

Karur 12 km near

Punjaipugalur 13 km near

Namakkal 26 km near

Tiruchengode 50 km near

Near By Taluks

Mohanur 7 km near

Karur 8 km near

Thanthoni 15 km near

Thottiam 20 km near

Near By Air Ports

Salem Airport 76 km near

Civil Airport 79 km near

Peelamedu Airport 132 km near

Madurai Airport 149 km near

Near By Tourist Places

Namakkal 23 km near

Erode 60 km near

Tiruchy 77 km near

Dindigul 85 km near

Yercaud 92 km near

Near By Districts

Karur 10 km near

Namakkal 26 km near

Erode 60 km near

Tiruchirappalli 76 km near

Near By RailWay Station

Karur Rail Way Station 10 km near

Pugalur Rail Way Station 15 km near

Vangal is also known as Vangal Kuppichipalayam.
