= Thanthonimalai =

- Karur City
- Location in Tamil Nadu, India Thanthonimalai (India)
- Coordinates: 10.9323°N 78.0913°E
- Country: India
- State: Tamil Nadu
- District: Karur

Population (2011)
  - Total: 53,854

Languages
  - Official: Tamil
- Time zone: UTC+5:30 (IST)

Thanthoni is a block in Karur Municipal Corporation in Karur district in the Indian state of Tamil Nadu. As of 2011, the town had a population of 53,854.. Thanthoni Kalyana Venkatesa Perumal temple is a famous temple in this area. Kaliamman Koil at Thanthoni malai was worshipped by king Vikramaditya.

== Demographics ==
According to 2011 census, Thanthonimalai had a population of 53,854 with a sex-ratio of 986 females for every 1,000 males, much above the national average of 929. A total of 5,624 were under the age of six, constituting 3,004 males and 2,620 females. Scheduled Castes and Scheduled Tribes accounted for 15.09% and .07% of the population respectively. The average literacy of the town was 77.24%, compared to the national average of 72.99%. The town had a total of 14729 households. There were a total of 23,177 workers, comprising 418 cultivators, 690 main agricultural labourers, 592 in house hold industries, 20,451 other workers, 1,026 marginal workers, 24 marginal cultivators, 138 marginal agricultural labourers, 58 marginal workers in household industries and 806 other marginal workers.
