= Puliyur, Nagapattinam =

Puliyur
- village
- Location in Tamil Nadu, India Puliyur (India)
- Coordinates: 10.7723°N 79.7833°E
- Country: India
- State: Tamil Nadu
- District: Nagapattinam

Languages
  - Official: Tamil
- Time zone: UTC+5:30 (IST)
- Vehicle registration: TN-51

Puliyur is a village in Nagapattinam district, Tamil Nadu, India. It is situated 7 km from Nagapattinam, District Headquarters and 3 km from Sikkal. The main deity is Lord Shiva called Vyagrapureeshwarar and the village in ancient days called as Vyagrapuri. There are quite a number of temples in this village such as 1. Sivagamasundari samedha Vyagrapureshwara temple 2. Lakshmi Narayana Perumal Temple 3. Varasiddhi vinayagar Temple 4. Ayyanar temple 5. Selvamuthu mariamman Temple

The village is famous for lot of Hindu religious activities and vyagrapuri seva trust located in Chennai actively takes part and arranges the festivals.

Themangalam, Puliyur, Adipallam, Sirangudi, Sikkavalam are combined functions as puliyur village and called as Themangalam Panchayat. Puliyur is also called as Sirangudi Puliyur. Puliyur has a total population of about 3000.

The nearest airport is at Tiruchirapalli, which is 130 kilometres from Puliyur and Chennai International Airport is approx. 350 kilometers away. This village is about 1 km north of Tiruvarur - Nagapattinam Highway. Bus stop - RamarMadam. Nearest Railway Station is Nagapattinam about 7 km

== See also ==
- Vathima
