= Puliyur, Karur =

Puliyur
- Village
- Location in Tamil Nadu, India
- Country: India
- State: Tamil Nadu
- District: Karur

Government
  - Type: town panchayat
- Elevation: 106 m (348 ft)

Population (2001)
  - Total: 10,845

Languages
  - Official: Tamil
- Time zone: UTC+5:30 (IST)
- PIN: 639114
- Telephone code: 04324
- Vehicle registration: TN 47

Puliyur is a panchayat town in Karur district in the Indian state of Tamil Nadu.

== Geography ==
Puliyur is located at 10.63°N 78.83°E. It has an average elevation of 106 metres (347 feet) .

== Demographics ==
As of 2001 India census, Puliyur had a population of 10,845. Males constitute 51% of the population and females 49%. Puliyur has an average literacy rate of 69%, higher than the national average of 59.5%: male literacy is 79%, and female literacy is 59%. In Puliyur, 10% of the population is under 6 years of age.

== Industries ==
Chettinad Cement Corporation Ltd has a Cement plant in Puliyur, established in 1961, majority of the populace is from the township of the company. A modern residential school and engineering college are being run by the company.
