= Krishnarayapuram =

- Town
- Location in Tamil Nadu, India
- Coordinates: 10°56′40″N 78°16′45″E
- Country: India
- State: Tamil Nadu
- Region: Kongu Nadu
- District: Karur

Population (2001)
  - Total: 10,526

Languages
  - Official: Tamil
- Time zone: UTC+5:30 (IST)
- Vehicle registration: TN-47

Krishnarayapuram is a panchayat town in Karur district in the Indian state of Tamil Nadu.

== Demographics ==
As of 2001 India census, Krishnarayapuram had a population of 10,526. Males constitute 50% of the population and females 50%. Krishnarayapuram has an average literacy rate of 61%, higher than the national average of 59.5%: male literacy is 68%, and female literacy is 54%. In Krishnarayapuram, 12% of the population is under 6 years of age.

== History ==
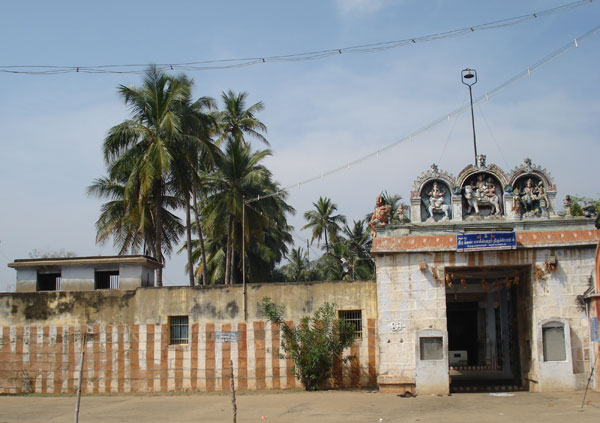
Thirukkan Maleeswarar Temple

Krishnarayapuram has temples of Thirukkan Maleesarar and Vandar Kuzhali Amman. This temple was renovated by the King Krishnadeva Raya during his conquest in Tamil Nadu to regain land from Islamic invaders and re-instate the traditional vedic life style along the river of Cauvery. Hence the name Krishnarayapuram. This place is also called Sithalavai. The railway station is Sithalavai(SEV).

== Economy ==
Krishnarayapuram is well known for its agricultural activities. One can easily find a lot of Banyan and Coconut trees surrounding this place. One of the most important crops is Betel leaf plants, which is transported to many places in Tamil Nadu and even to North India. A special variety of Brinjal (known as kodikaal brinjal) is also popular. These are the most important crops. Because of the river Cauvery, Krishnarayapuram always looks green. Although the river is kept on shrinking, because of Eucalyptus and other plantation.

== Politics ==
Krishnarayapuram assembly constituency (SC) is part of Karur (Lok Sabha constituency).

== See also ==
- Kattalai, India
