= Karur district =

- District of Tamil Nadu
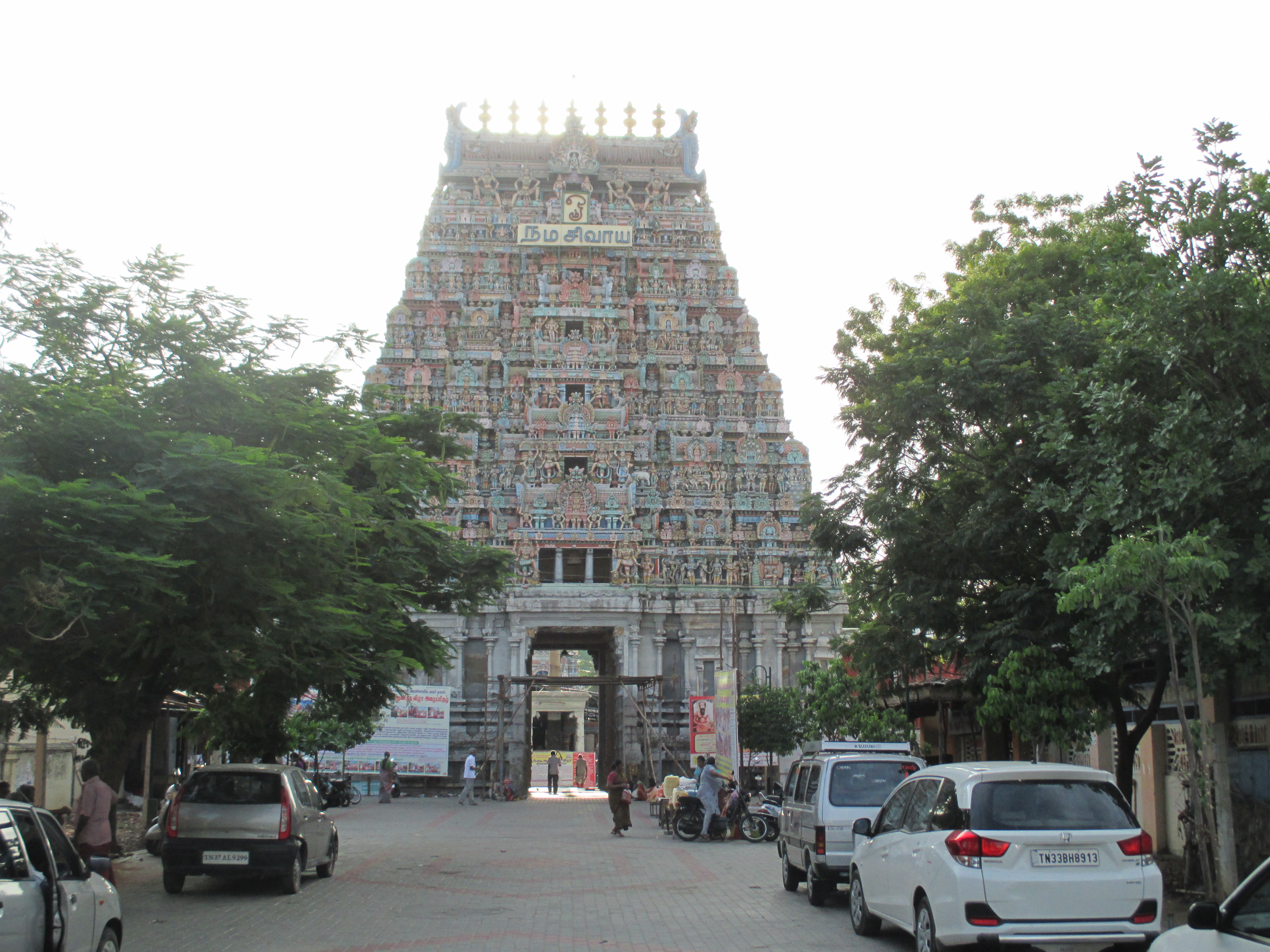
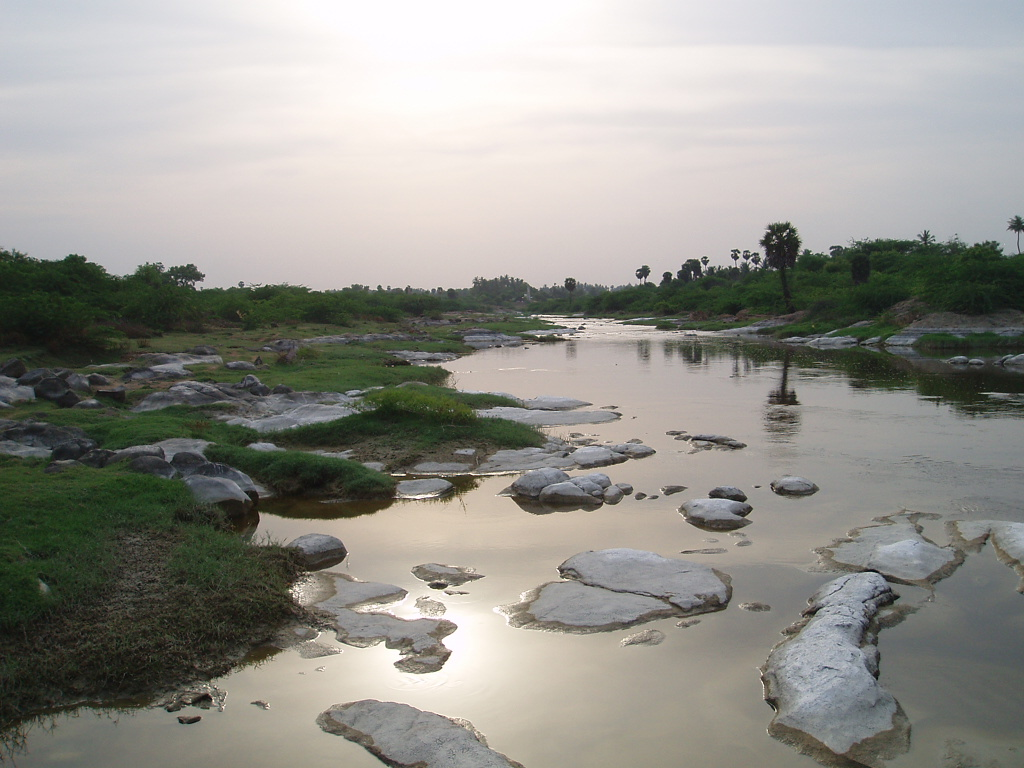
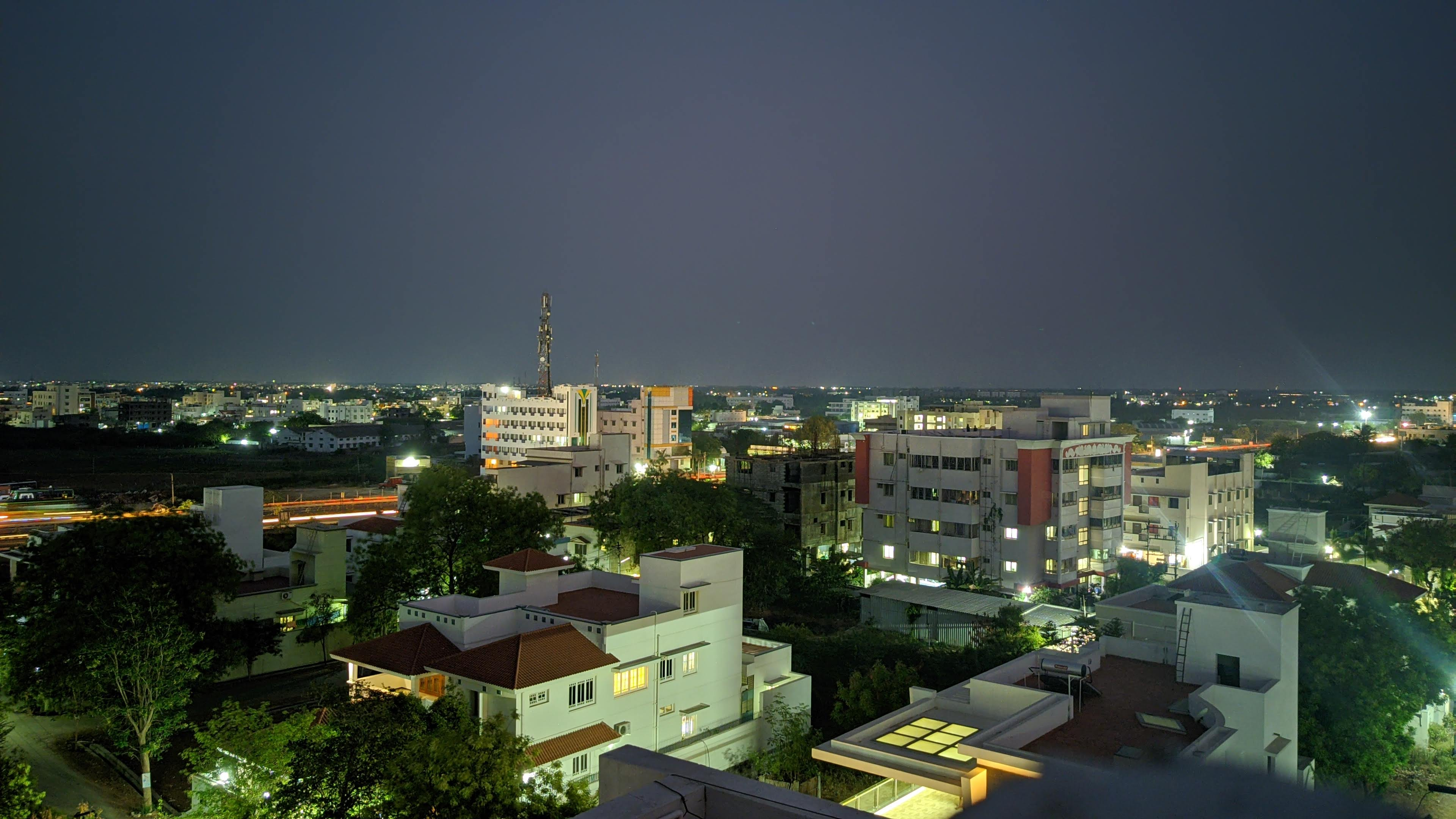
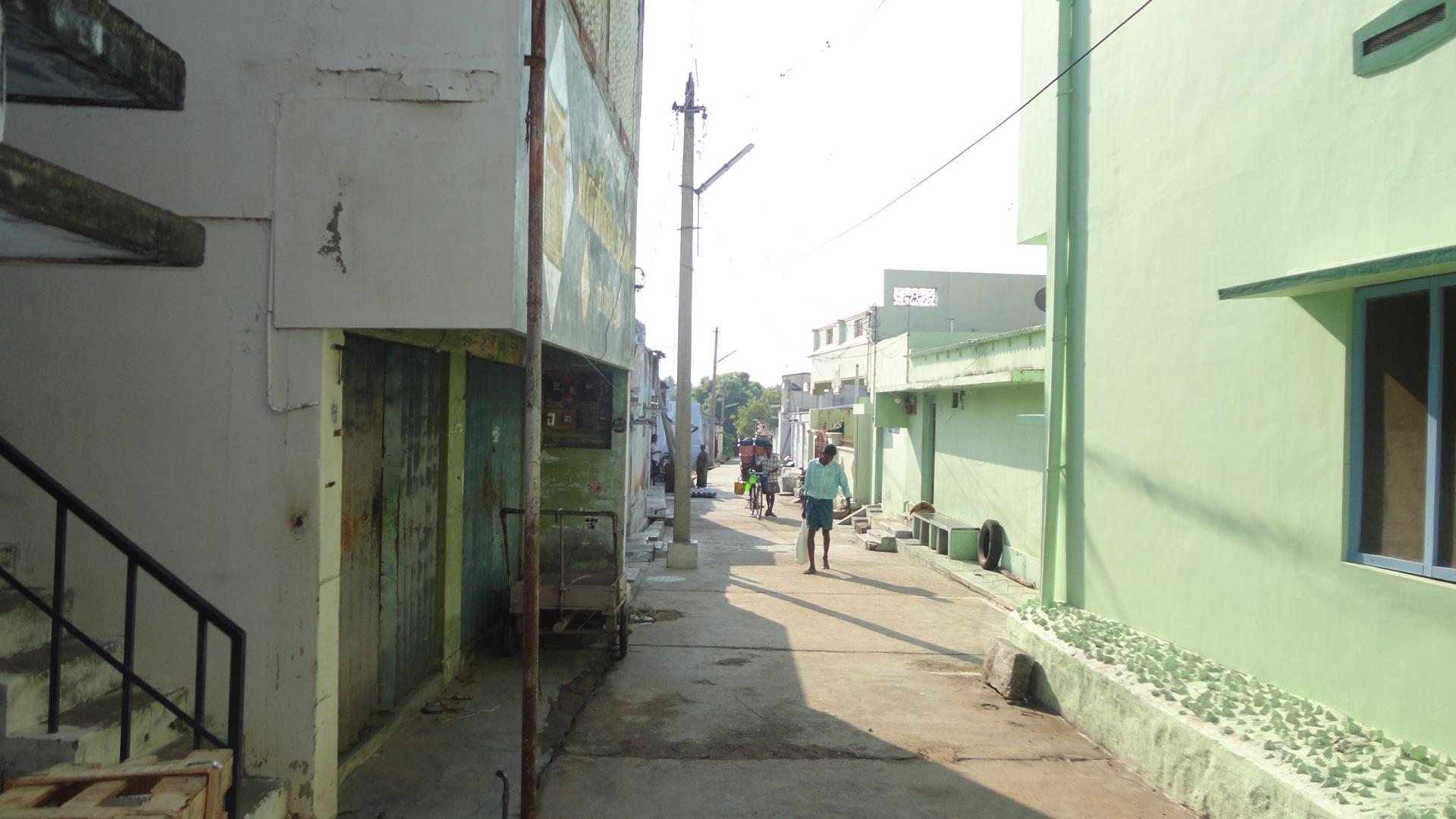
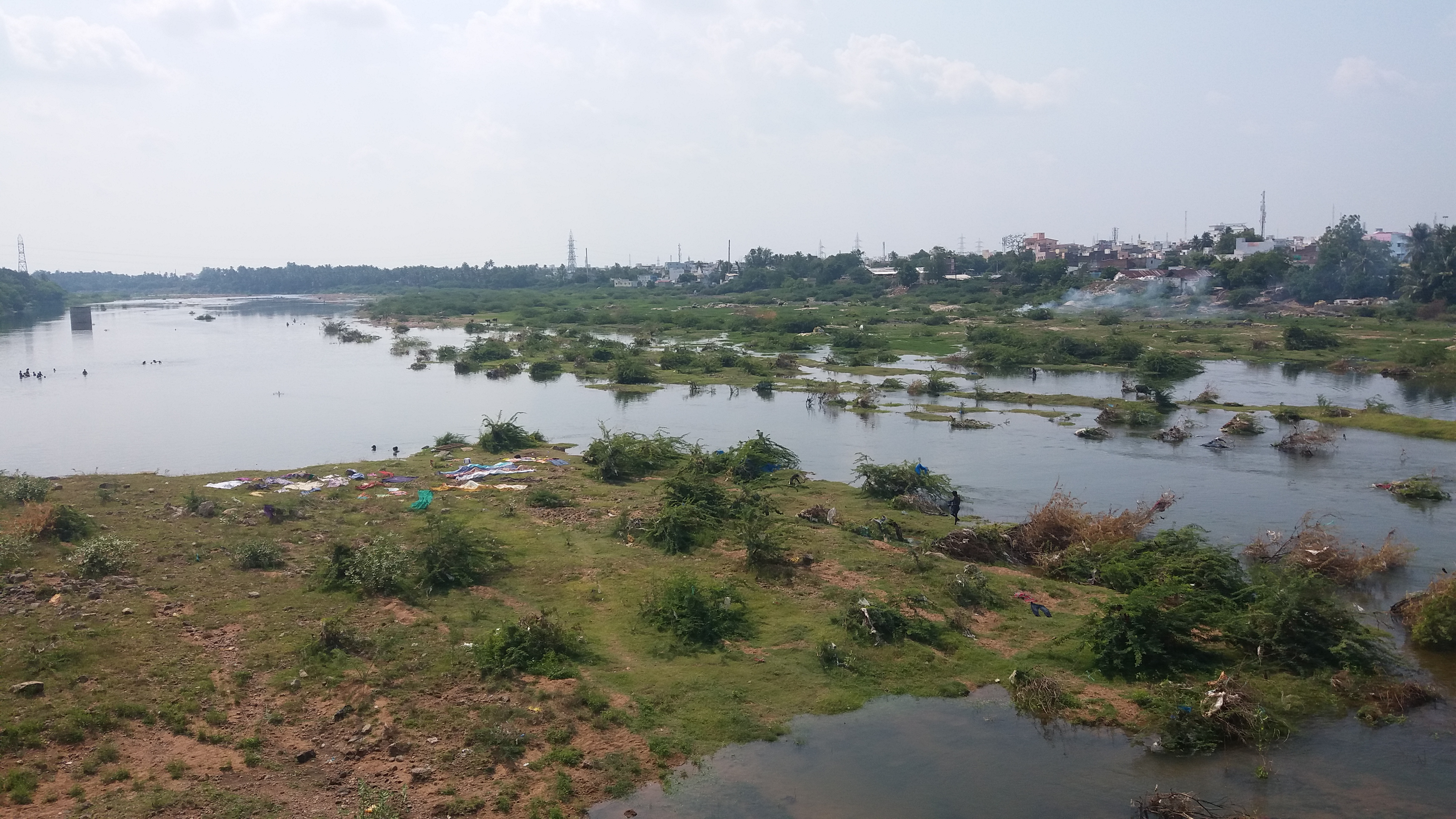
- Clockwise from top-left: Pasupateeswarar temple, Noyyal in Ungampalayam, Street in Aravakurichi, Part of the Amaravathi River near Karur, Karur skyline
- Interactive map of Karur district
- Coordinates: 10°57′28.8″N 78°4′48″E
- Country: India
- State: Tamil Nadu
- Municipal corporation: Karur
- Municipality: Kulithalai, Pugalur, Pallapatti
- Town Panchayats: Aravakurichi, Krishnarayapuram, Marudur, Punjai Thottakurichi, P.J. Cholapuram, Nangavaram, Puliyur, Uppidamangalam
- Established: 30 September 1995
- Founded by: J. Jayalalithaa
- Headquarters: Karur
- Taluks: Karur; Aravakurichi; Manmangalam; Krishnarayapuram; Kulithalai; Kadavur; Pugalur

Government
  - Collector: Thangavel, I.A.S
  - SP: E. Sundaravathanam, I.P.S

Area
  - Total: 2,856 km^{2} (1,103 sq mi)

Population (2011)
  - Total: 1,064,493
  - Density: 373/km^{2} (970/sq mi)

Languages
  - Official: Tamil
- Time zone: UTC+5:30 (IST)
- PIN: 639xxx, 621xxx, 638xxx.
- Telephone code: +91(0)4324, +91(0)4323, +91(0)4320 for Karur, Kulithalai and Aravakkurichi Circles Respectively.
- Vehicle registration: TN 47
- Largest city: Karur
- Sex ratio: 1015 ♂/♀
- Literacy: 81.74%
- Lok Sabha constituency: 2 – Karur, Perambalur (Part)
- Vidhan Sabha constituency: 4
- Central location: 10°57′N 78°4′E
- Climate: Max 38c – Min 17c (Köppen)
- Website: karur.nic.in

Karur district is one of the 38 districts (a district located centrally along the Kaveri and Amaravathi rivers) in the Indian state of Tamil Nadu. The main town in Karur District is the city of Karur, which is also the district headquarters. The district has a population of 1,064,493 with a sex-ratio of 1,015 females for every 1,000 males, according to 2011 census.

== History ==
Karur is one of the oldest towns of Tamil Nadu and has played a very significant role in the history and culture of the Tamils. Its history dates back over 2000 years, and was a flourishing trading center from the early Sangam days. In the ancient and medieval times, the area was ruled by Cheras, Gangas and Cholas. The Pasupatheesvarar Temple in Karur was built by the Chola kings in the 7th century. Later the Nayakars followed by Tipu Sultan also ruled Karur. The British added Karur to their possessions after destroying the Karur Fort during the war against Tipu Sultan in 1783. There is a memorial at Rayanur dedicated to the warriors who lost their lives in the fight against the British in the Anglo-Mysore Wars.

=== Taluk and District formation ===
Post British annexure to the Madras presidency, Karur became a taluk headquarters and was the first part of Coimbatore District and later Tiruchirappalli District. A new district was formed on 30 September 1996 by bifurcating Karur, Kulithalai and Manapparai Taluks of Tiruchirappalli district, which comprises the present-day Aravakkurichi, Manmangalam, Pugalur, Karur, Krishnarayapuram, Kulithalai, Musiri, Kadavur and Manapparai Taluks.

Later, within a year, Musiri taluk was separated from Kulithalai taluk. Both taluks were reunited with Tiruchirapalli District. The Karur taluk was bifurcated to form Aravakkurichi and Karur taluks whereas Kulithalai taluk was bifurcated to form Krishnarayapuram and Kulithalai taluks.

Krishnarayapuram taluk was again bifurcated to form Kadavur taluk whereas Karur taluk was also bifurcated to form Manmangalam taluk. Some of the villages from Aravakkurichi and Manmangalam Taluks were separated and united to form Pugalur taluk.

At present, Karur District has 7 Taluks.

== Geography and climate ==
With headquarters at Karur, it is the centrally located district of Tamil Nadu. It is bounded by Namakkal district in the north, Dindigul district in the south, Tiruchirapalli district on the east and Erode & Tiruppur districts on the west. Karur is located at 10°57'° N 78°4'° E has an average elevation of 122 metres (400 feet). It is about 371 km (231 mi) south west of Chennai (Madras), the capital of Tamil Nadu.

The highest temperature is obtained in early May–June is usually about 34 °C (93.2 °F), though it usually exceeds 38 °C (100.4 °F) for a few days most years. Average daily temperature in Karur during January is around 23 °C (73.4 °F), though the temperature rarely falls below 17 °C (62.6 °F). The average annual rainfall is about 775 mm (30.5 in) which gets most of its seasonal rainfall from the north-east monsoon winds, during late September to mid November.

== Demographics ==
Historical population
Year	Pop.	±% p.a.
1901	408,424	—
1911	443,204	+0.82%
1921	461,471	+0.40%
1931	464,590	+0.07%
1941	524,076	+1.21%
1951	599,066	+1.35%
1961	639,170	+0.65%
1971	687,356	+0.73%
1981	756,757	+0.97%
1991	854,162	+1.22%
2001	935,686	+0.92%
2011	1,064,493	+1.30%

Religions in Karur district (2011)
Religion	Percent
Hinduism	94.05%
Islam	4.61%
Christianity	1.25%
Other or not stated	0.09%

According to 2011 census, Karur district has a population of 1,064,493 with a sex-ratio of 1,015 females for every 1,000 males, much above the national average of 929. 40.82% of the population lived in urban areas. A total of 102,731 were under the age of six, constituting 52,969 males and 49,762 females. Scheduled Castes and Scheduled Tribes accounted for 20.80% and 0.05% of the population respectively with the average literacy of 68%, compared to the national average of 72.99%. The district has a total of 287,095 households with 543,298 workers, comprising 83,800 cultivators, 182,639 main agricultural laborers, 10,162 in house hold industries, 231,906 other workers, 34,791 marginal workers, 2,072 marginal cultivators, 18,198 marginal agricultural laborers, 1,178 marginal workers in household industries and 13,343 other marginal workers.

Languages of Karur district (2011)
1. Tamil (92.0%)
2. Telugu (6.41%)
3. Others (1.64%)

At the time of the 2011 census, 91.95% of the population spoke Tamil and 6.41% Telugu as their first language.

== Administration and politics ==
Karur district has two Municipalities, 11 Town Panchayats, 158 Village Panchayats and 203 Revenue Villages. It consists of two Lok Sabha constituencies, Karur and Perambalur. The four Tamil Nadu Assembly constituencies in Karur are Aravakkurichi, Karur, Krishnarayapuram, and Kulithalai.

The District is divided into two Revenue divisions, Karur and Kulithalai. alai, Krishnarayapuram, and Kadavur, their blocks include K. Paramathy, Aravakurichi, Karur, Thanthoni, Kadavur, Krishnarayapuram, Kulithalai, and Thogaimalai. Town Panchayats in Karur include Aravakurichi, Pallapatti, Punjaipugalur, TNPL Pugalur (Kagithapuram), Puliyur, Uppidamangalam, Palaya Jeyankonda Cholapuram, Krishnarayapuram, Marudur, and Nangavaram. The Major villages are : K.Paramathi, Thennilai, Thogaimalai, Pavithram, Chinnadhrapuram, Punnam chathiram, Mayanur, Lalapet, Vangal, Nerur, Ayyar malai, Velliyanai, Esanatham.

== Politics ==
District	No.	Constituency	Name	Party	Alliance	Remarks
Karur	134	Aravakurichi	R. Elango	DMK	SPA	
Karur	135	Karur	M. R. Vijayabhaskar	AIADMK	AIADMK+	Supported TVK
Karur	135	Karur	Vacant			On 29 June 2026, resigned from office
Karur	136	Krishnarayapuram (SC)	Sathya M.	TVK	TVK+	
Karur	137	Kulithalai	Suriyanur A. Chandran	DMK	SPA	

== Economy ==
=== Agriculture ===
Karur District is a part of cauvery delta region and utilization of land area in the district is up to 44.59%. 4.76% of the land area remains as uncultivated land, and the rest 2.74% is forest area in Karur district. Black soil is the predominant soil type in this district accounting for 35.51% followed by laterite soil for 23.85% of the total soil cover. The remaining 20.31% is sandy, coastal and alluvium soil.

The main crops are paddy, banana, sugarcane, beetle leaf, grams & pulses, tapioca, kora grass, groundnuts, oilseeds, tropical vegetables, garland flowers, and medicinal herbs.

=== Home textiles ===
Karur is famous for its home textiles. The district has five major product groups: bed linens, kitchen linens, toilet linens, table linens, wall hangings. Karur generated around Rs.6000 crores in foreign exchange through direct and indirect exports in 2016. Allied industries like ginning and spinning mills, dyeing factories, weaving etc., employs at around 450,000 people in and around Karur.

On the international textile map, Karur has become synonymous with hand loom made-ups products. The weaving industry came to Karur from Kerala and has earned a reputation for its high-quality hand-loom products today. Hand loom exports from Karur began on a modest scale with just 15 exporters in 1975 and today Karur has thousands of exporters and the products are supplied to world leading chain stores like Walmart, Target, IKEA, Åhléns etc.

=== Paper ===
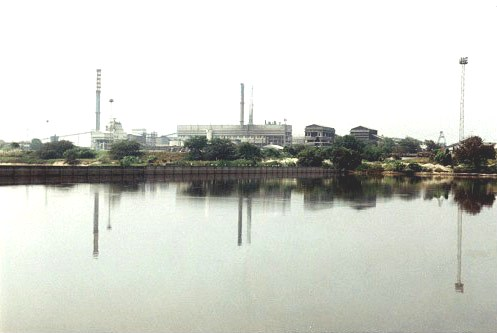
TNPL Mill

TNPL is promoted in TNPL Pugalur, by the Government of Tamil Nadu with a loan assistance from the World Bank. Today TNPL is the largest producer of bagasse-based paper in the world and the 2nd largest paper producer in Asia. It produces 4,00,000 tons of Printing & writing paper and 2,00,000 tons of Paper board and consumes 1 million tonnes of bagasse every year, providing more employment options. It has its finished products, production plant at Mayanur.

=== Petroleum ===
Bharat Petroleum Corporation Limited (BPCL) has its receiving terminal and retails distribution plant at Attur, near Karur.

=== Bus body building ===
Karur is a renowned hub for bus building industry. Nearly 95% of south Indian private bus bodies are built in Karur. The total business is estimated to be around Rs.2750 crore per Annum. There are more than 200 builders in the district and they make up to 3500 buses per year, including government buses of some states like Karnataka, Tamil Nadu etc.

=== Cement ===
Karur is also home to Chettinad Cements and TNPL Cements. Chettinad Cements has an installed production capacity of 600,000 tons per annum, with another 1.1 million tons expansion in the pipeline.

=== Sugar ===
EID Parry has a sugar factory unit at Pugalur with a capacity of 4000 TCD per year. It also has a 22 MW co-generation power plant, with TNPL.

=== Banking ===
The leading private scheduled banks Karur Vysya Bank and Lakshmi Vilas Bank have their headquarters in Karur.

=== Nylon nets ===
Around 65% of India's production of HDPE filament and associated products are from Karur district. These are widely used in fishing and fruit cultivating areas throughout South Asia.

=== Gem stones ===
The Karur belt produces amethyst, cat's eyes, feldspar, moonstones, aquamarines, sapphires, jasper and beryl.

Apart from these, there are 3 SIDCO industrial estates, a textile park namely, The Karur Textile Park Limited and many private contributing sectors like LGB Retreads, Rolon Chains, VKA Polymers, Shobika Impex, VKA Diary etc., have their headquarters or production units in Karur District.

== Health ==
Karur district has 1 Government Medical College Hospital, 5 Government General Hospitals, 29 Primary Health Care centres and 168 health sub-centres. In recent years, it has gained notoriety as one of the districts with the highest prevalence of HIV/AIDS in the country. In response to the epidemic, a massive district-level communication campaign (DLCC) was launched in 2006 by the USAID-funded APAC-VHS project in the district. In 2007, the district received its own ART (Antiretroviral drug therapy) Centre, located at the Government General Hospital. Also, in 2007, Karur was selected as an IMAI pilot district by the World Health Organization and Solidarity and Action against the HIV Infection in India, with support from the District Collectorate and Tamil Nadu AIDS Control Society.

== Transportation ==
=== Road ===
Karur is connected with the rest of India through all modern means of transportation. The International highway AH-43 pass away here. There are two national highways: NH-44 (North South Corridor Road (Kashmir to Kanyakumari)) Srinagar – Kanyakumari and NH-67 (Nagapattinam – Trichy – Karur – Coimbatore – Gudalur), which connect with other major towns such as Chennai, Erode, Tiruppur, Pollachi, Hosur, Tuticorin, Dindigul, Theni, Oddanchatram, Dharapuram, Palani, Tanjore, Karaikudi, Kumbakonam, Kochi, and Pondicherry. Karur is well connected with Bengaluru in all means of transport, it is just 290 km from Bengaluru.

=== Train ===
Karur Junction railway station (Station Code – KRR) is an important railway junction in the state, connected to the Indian Railways network. Apart from this, there are 17 other stations which lie across Erode-Tiruchirappalli line and Template:Salem-Karur-Dindigul line connecting all other parts of the country. More than 45 Express and Passenger trains fly through Karur daily.

=== Airport ===
The nearest airports are Tiruchirappalli Airport (85 km), Salem Airport (115 km), Coimbatore Airport (130 km) and Madurai Airport (135 km).

=== Sea port ===
The nearest major sea ports are Thoothukudi (280 km), Chennai (372 km) and Cochin (344 km).

== Villages ==
- Chinna dharapurum
- Esanatham
- Inootrumangalam
- K.Paramathi
- kadavur
- Manavasi
- Nerur
- Panchapatti
- Pavithram
- Pothuravuthanpatty
- Thennilai
- Thogaimalai
- Vangal
- Velliyani
