= Punjai Puliampatti =

Punjai Puliyampatti Puliampatti
- Municipality town
- Location in Tamil Nadu, India
- Coordinates: 11.35°N 77.168°E
- Country: India
- State: Tamil Nadu
- District: Erode
- Taluk: Sathyamangalam
- Region: Kongu Nadu

Government
  - Type: Second Grade Municipality
  - Body: Punjai Puliampatti Municipality
- Elevation: 312 m (1,024 ft)

Population (2019)
  - Total: 30,000

Languages
  - Official: Tamil
- Time zone: UTC+5:30 (IST)
- PIN: 638459
- STD code: 04295
- Vehicle registration: TN-36

Punjai Puliampatti is a municipality in the Erode district of Tamil Nadu, India.

== Geography ==
Punjai Puliampatti is a municipal town in the northwest of the Erode District. It belongs to the Sathyamangalam taluk and Bhavanisagar state assembly constituency, and the Nilgiris parliamentary constituency.

Geologically, Punjai Puliampatti has three main types of soils: red loam (70%), black loam (20%), and red sand (10%). In general, the soil in and around the town is fertile and good for agricultural purposes. The temperature is a mild average of 28 °C (82 °F) throughout the year except during summer where temperatures can increase drastically with highs up to 37 °C (99 °F) and lows up to 19 °C (66 °F). There are an average of 40 rainy days per year, making the ground very dry, and any rainfall the area receives can be meagre, uncertain or unequally distributed.

== Demographics ==
As of 2019, the town population numbers around 30,000, with about 1,000 commercial electrical connections and about 8,500 households. According to the 2011 Census of India, Punjai Puliampatti had a population of 18,967. The town contained 5,480 households, and the male-to-female ratio was 1,003 females for every 1,000 males, which is above the national average. Scheduled Castes and Scheduled Tribes accounted for 20.4% and 0.04% of the population respectively. The average town literacy rate was 74.4% compared to the national average of 72.99%. There were a total of 8,629 workers: 184 cultivators, 500 main agricultural labourers, 553 in household industries, 6,794 other workers, 598 marginal workers, 11 marginal cultivators, 48 marginal agrarian labourers, 40 marginal workers in household industries and 499 other marginal workers.

=== Religion ===
Religious census
Religion	Percent(%)
Hindu	90.04%
Muslim	7.66%
Christian	2.14%
Sikh	0.01%
Buddhist	0.01%
Jain	0.0%
Other	0.15%
No religion	0.0%

According to the religious census of 2011, the population of Punjai Puliampatti was 90.04% Hindus, 7.66% Muslims, 2.14% Christians, 0.01% Sikhs, 0.01% Buddhists, 0.0% Jains, and 0.15% persons of other religions.

== Transport ==
The town is connected to nearby towns and major cities by roads.

It connects with three main roads passing through the town: The NH 948 passing through the town leads to Coimbatore and Sathyamangalam, and the SH-166 connects with Bhavanisagar and Palladam via Avinashi, Mettupalayam, Gobichettipalayam, and Tiruppur.

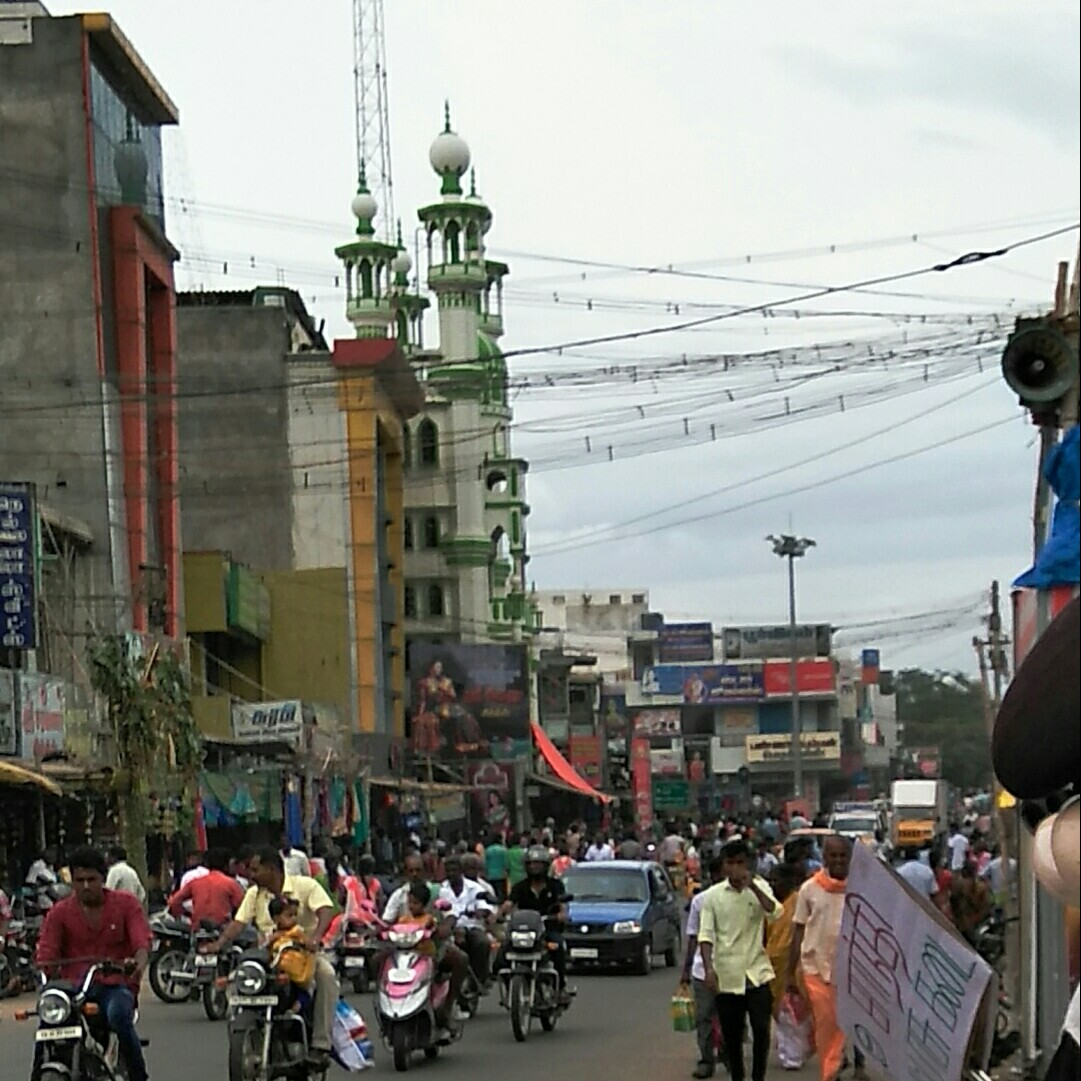
Punjai Puliampatti main road (Jawahar main road) NH 209(NH 948)

The nearest bypass road is National Highway 544, at a distance of 22 km (14 mi) away. MDR-889 leads to Puliampatti via Bhavanisagar Road by crossing State Highway 15, as well as nearby major roads MDR-888 and MDR-888A.

== Industry ==
Punjai Puliampatti workers are mostly employed in the primary and secondary sectors. The workforce is made up of about 42% of industry workers, 18% in small industries (small scale and cottage industries), 12% in agriculture and 28% in trading or other activities.

There are some industries within the jurisdiction of the local body. The town also serves as an important source of supply for agricultural inputs such as tobacco for adjoining areas.

== Economy ==
The main source of income for Punjai Puliampatti comes from trading and small businesses along with agriculture. There are also many spinning mills and weaving units in and around the town. Others commute to Coimbatore for work and education. It is an industrial area that includes around 70 textile mills. The workforce is made up of about 42% of industry workers, 18% in small industries (small scale and cottage industries), 12% in agriculture and 28% in trading or other activities.

It has a weekly market covering an area of 45 acres, which brings in an annual income of approximately 40 lakhs ($48,275 USD) for the municipality. The total area of the market is roughly 45 acres, making it one of the largest weekly markets in Tamil Nadu. The cattle market starts Wednesday and ends on Thursday every week, on which day sales reach roughly 2 crores ($241,356 USD).

== See also ==
- Thandukkaran palayam
