= Thandukkaran palayam =

- village
- Location in Tamil Nadu, India Thandukkaran palayam (India)
- Coordinates: 11°16′52″N 77°12′40″E
- Country: India
- State: Tamil Nadu
- District: Tirupur
- Elevation: 11.281111 m (37.01152 ft)

Population
  - Total: Approximately 4,500

Languages
  - Official: Tamil
- Time zone: UTC+5:30 (IST)
- PIN: 641655
- Telephone code: 04296
- Vehicle registration: TN-40
- Nearest city: Tirupur
- Lok Sabha constituency: Nilgiris
- Climate: Moderate (Köppen)
- Avg. summer temperature: 30–35 °C (86–95 °F)
- Avg. winter temperature: 25–30 °C (77–86 °F)

Thandukkaran Palayam is a village located in Tirupur district of Tamil Nadu in India. It is located between Avinashi and Punjai Puliampatti.

Agriculture is the main occupation of this village. Although garment making also plays a vital role in the development of this village. The village is also known for its silk weaving, although that industry is declining as silk weaving jobs have moved into cities.

Residents are mostly Kongu Vellalar gounders with a few small communities of Brahmins, Chettiar's, etc.

The Lakshmi Narashima Perumal temple, Sri Ramalinga Sowdeswari Amman Temple and Chitthammal, Konammal temple are located in this village.

One Panchayat union school, opened by the late Chief Minister Kamaraj is running in this village. Many entrepreneurs in the village started their education from this school.

SNR groups Marriage Hall also located in this village. The actor Sivakumar married Lakshmi at this hall.

Tamil is the dominant language used by the local population.
