= Avinasilingeshwarar Temple (Tiruppukkozhiyur) =

Tiruppukkozhiyur
- Avinasiappar Temple
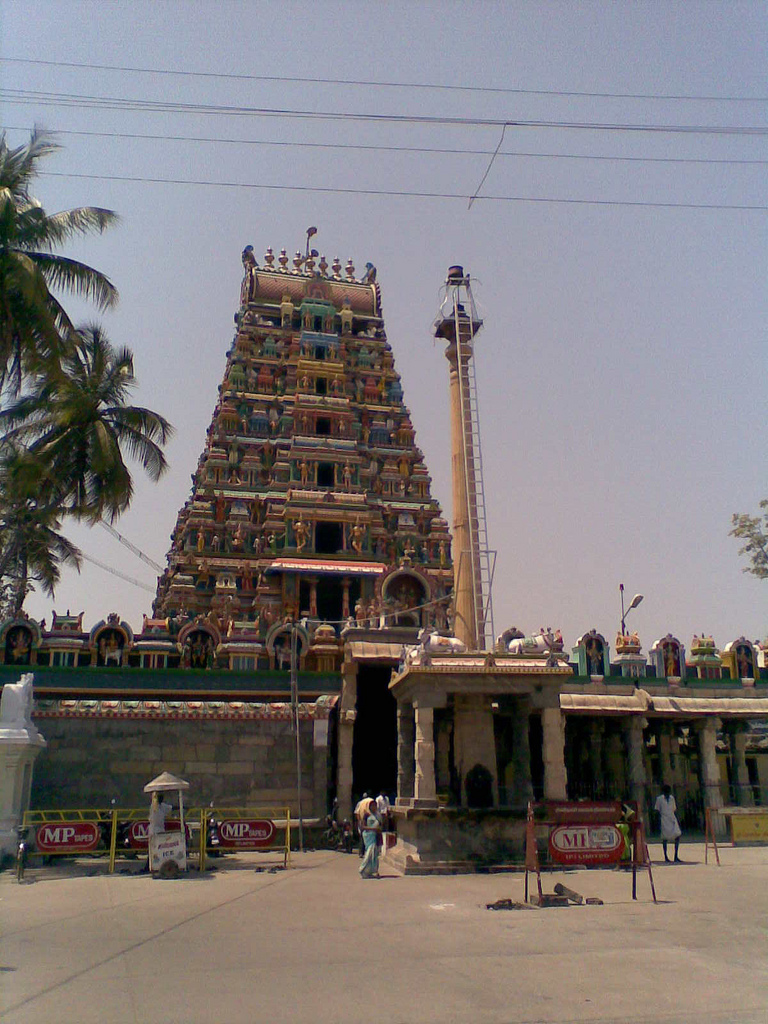

- Avinashilingeswarar Temple, Avinashi, Tiruppur, Tamil Nadu

Religion
- Affiliation: Hinduism
- District: Tiruppur
- Deity: Avinasiyappar (Shiva)

Location
- Location: Avinashi
- State: Tamil Nadu
- Country: India
- Coordinates: 11.1882°N 77.2685°E

Architecture
- Type: Dravidian architecture
- Elevation: 367 m (1,204 ft)

Website
- https://hrce.tn.gov.in/hrcehome/index_temple.php?tid=10055

Tiruppukkozhiyur (also called Karunaiyaaththaal Temple, Avinasilingeswarar temple and Avainasiappar temple) is a Hindu temple dedicated to the deity Shiva, located in Avinasi, a panchayat town in Tiruppur district in the South Indian state of Tamil Nadu. Shiva is worshipped as Avinasiappar, and is represented by the lingam. His consort Parvati is depicted as Karunambigai.

== Photogallery ==
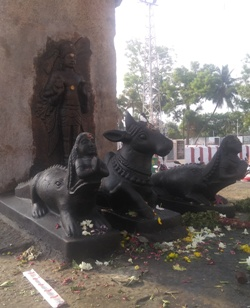
Sculptures in front of rajagopura

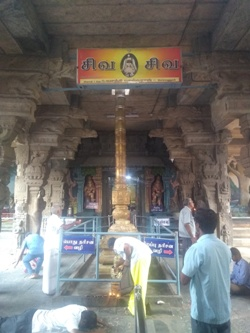
Front mandapa

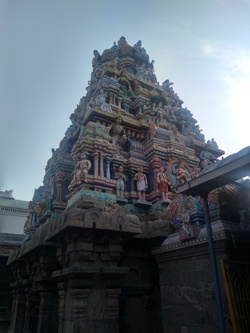
Vimana of presiding deity

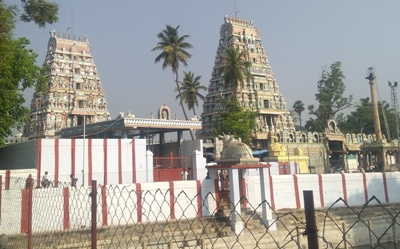
Gopuras of Hindu deities

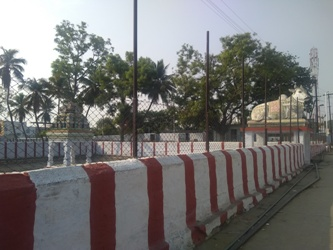
Temple tank

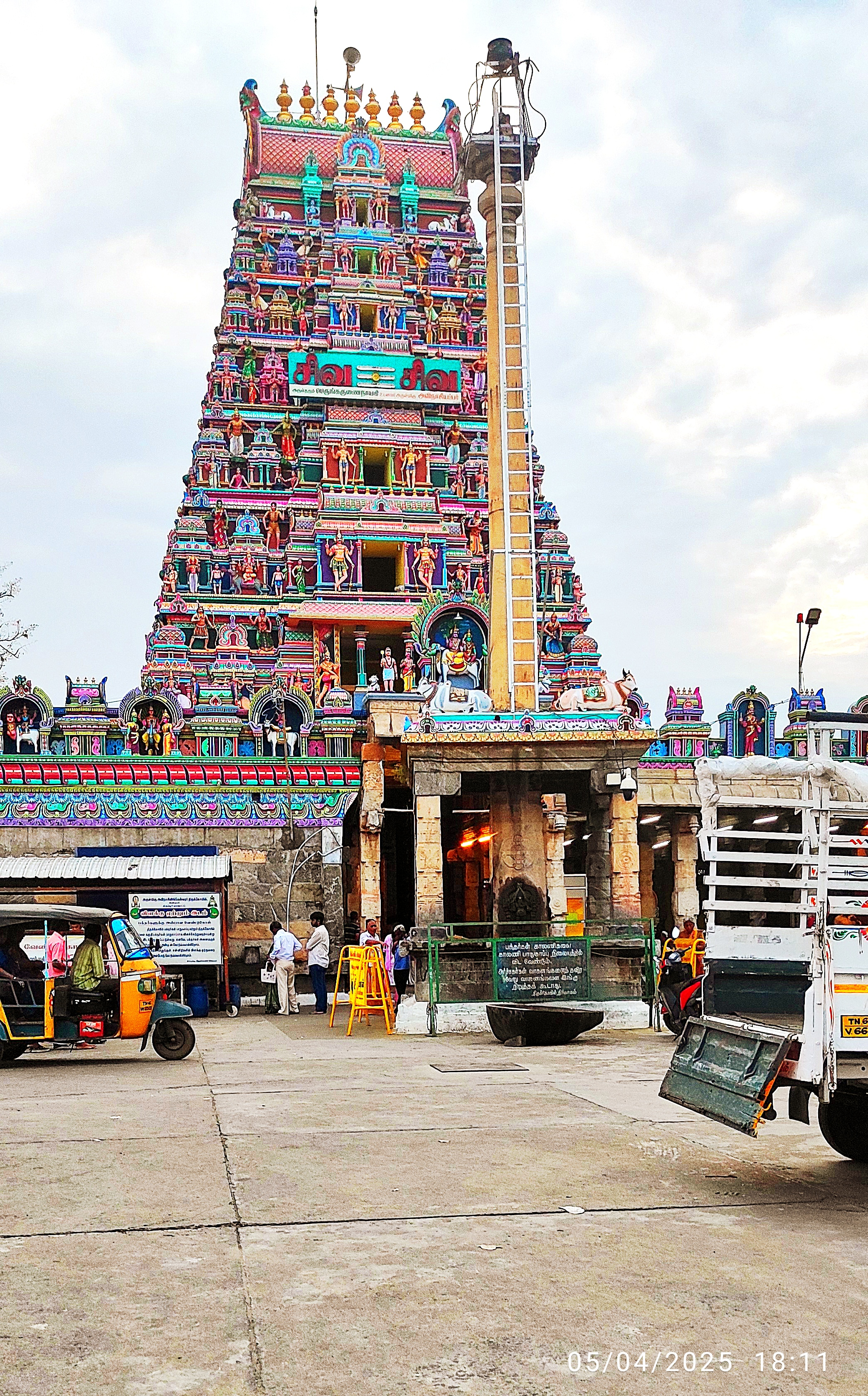
Avinashiyappar Temple (Shiva)
