= List of major district roads in Tamil Nadu =

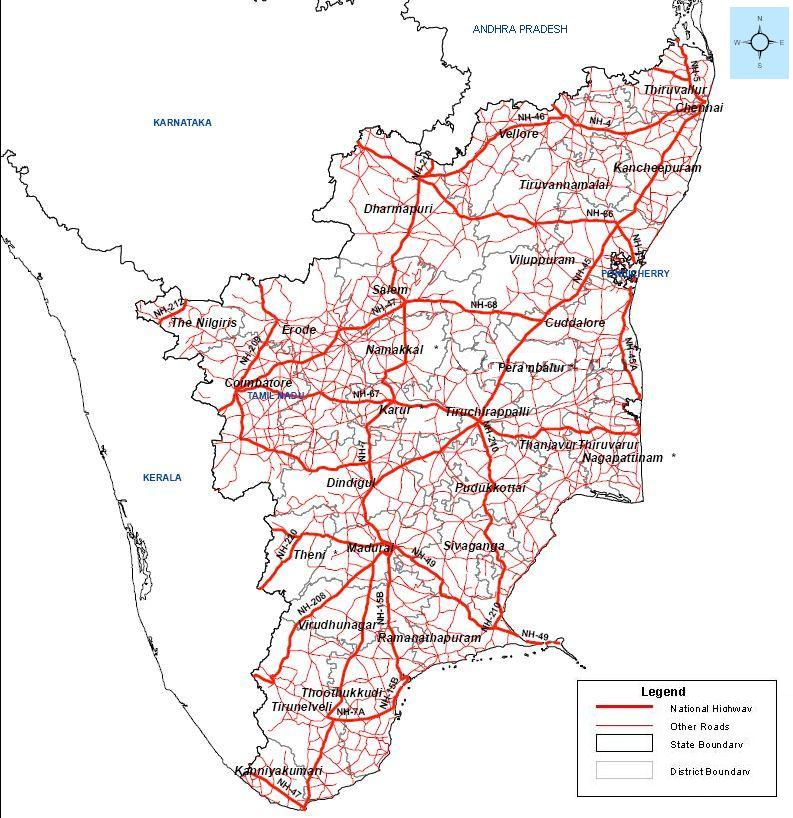
Map indicating road network of Tamil Nadu

In Tamil Nadu, there is a separate Highways Department (HD) which was established in April 1946 and renamed as Highways & Minor Ports Department (HMPD) on 30 October 2008. HMPD of Tamil Nadu is primarily responsible for construction and maintenance of roads including national highways, state highways and major district roads in Tamil Nadu.

Roads with traffic density less than 10,000 PCUs but more than 5,000 PCUs are designated as major district roads (MDR). MDRs provide linkage between production and marketing centres within a district. They also provide connections between district and taluk headquarters with the state highways and national highways. Construction and maintenance is carryout by the Highways Department for MDR along with state highways and ODR. These roads have a minimum width of 15 meters.

== Lane wise distribution ==
Details of lane wise distribution of MDR roads in Tamil Nadu as of March 2013:

S. no	Division	Single lane (in km)	Intermediate lane (in km)	Double lane (in km)	Multi lane (in km)	Total (in km)
1	Chennai City Roads			31.73	10.01	41.74
2	Tiruvallur	69.50	96.45	119.02	7.00	291.97
3	Chengalpattu	129.61	89.25	152.83	5.30	376.98
4	Vellore	97.80	55.60	60.65	12.65	226.70
5	Vaniyambadi	8.80	20.00	29.96	1.60	60.36
6	Thiruvannamalai	139.00	191.30	110.95		441.25
7	Villupuram	66.15	102.32	18.52		186.99
8	Kallakurichi	189.35	52.50	47.30		289.15
9	Cuddalore	162.72	158.61	73.78	0.40	395.50
10	Ariyalur	93.60	85.71	42.19	1.40	222.90
11	Trichy	165.31	112.65	55.52	2.50	335.98
12	Pudukottai	97.59	311.97	27.87		437.43
13	Thanjavur	182.20	214.18	47.73		444.10
14	Nagapattinam	81.01	201.71	14.85	1.20	298.76
15	Tiruvarur	124.00	92.95	13.40		230.35
16	Salem	212.57	152.67	238.94	16.73	620.90
17	Namakkal	10.50	191.64	69.94	1.95	274.04
18	Krishnagiri	28.31	153.09	109.20	2.76	293.36
19	Dharmapuri	73.70	117.03	87.91		278.64
20	Tiruppur	62.00	87.88	79.61	9.20	238.68
21	Dharapuram	91.12	130.79	47.45		269.36
22	Erode	62.00	86.82	103.13	3.06	255.00
23	Karur	113.72	218.68	75.20		407.60
24	Coimbatore	29.40	105.25	155.00	26.17	315.82
25	Pollachi	72.14	83.50	27.95	0.80	184.39
26	Gobi	31.30	98.20	75.47	2.24	207.20
27	Ooty	27.37	148.80	4.20		180.37
28	Madurai	176.30	68.00	306.25	1.60	552.14
29	Theni	6.18	90.85	129.03		226.05
30	Dindigul	284.93	328.29	144.50	0.97	758.69
31	Sivagangai	154.86	124.16	40.67	0.80	320.49
32	Ramanathapuram	144.98	141.36	40.80		327.14
33	Tirunelveli	107.82	60.44	54.21	0.00	222.47
34	Tenkasi	56.98	68.90	38.80		164.67
35	Thoothukudi	95.62	100.39	95.48	2.28	293.77
36	Virudhunagar	202.53	109.21	20.91		332.64
37	Nagercoil	55.38	76.20	104.62		236.20
38	Cheyyar					
39	Perambalur					
	Grand Total	3706.34	4527.33	2895.52	110.61	11239.79

== List of MDRs ==
List of major district roads in Tamil Nadu (as of March 2019).

=== MDR 1 to MDR 100 ===
Road number	OSM relation	Name of road	Division	Length (in km)	Remarks
MDR	OSM	Soolaimeni - Thervoy Kandigai Road	Tiruvallur	4.80	
MDR	OSM	Pattukkottai Bypass Road	Thanjavur	7.40	
MDR	OSM	Velankanni - Thiruthuraipoondi Road (Abandoned Section)	Nagapattinam	1.057	KM 16/23 to KM 16/68, KM 22/015 to KM 22/399, KM 22/432 to KM 22/655.
MDR	OSM	Rasipuram Bypass Road	Namakkal	6.00	KM 2/8 to KM 8/8
MDR1	OSM	Abulkalam Azad Road	Tirunelveli	1.80	
MDR5	OSM	Aduthurai - South Thiruneelakudi Road	Thanjavur	2.80	KM 10/4 to KM 13/2
MDR6	OSM	Ayikudi - Nainaragaram Road	Tenkasi	3.20	
MDR7	OSM	Akkur Railway Feeder Road	Nagapattinam	0.80	
MDR9	OSM	Alagesapuram Road	Tuticorin	1.32	
MDR10	OSM	Alampatti - Sedapatti Road	Madurai	18.40	
MDR11	OSM	Alapakkam Railway Feeder Road	Cuddalore	0.524	
MDR12	OSM	Allithurai - Thogaimalai Road	Trichy, Karur	28.20	KM 5/4 to KM 33/6, road till KM 5/4 is part of another MDR
MDR13	OSM	Ambarampalayam - Anaimalai - Sethumadai Road	Pollachi	16.00	MDR till KM 16/0, from there unclassified road
MDR14		Ambasamudram - Alangulam Road		20.40	Upgraded as SH40B
MDR16	OSM	Ambasamudram Travellers Bungalow Road	Tirunelveli	1.00	
MDR18	OSM	Ambur - Sathgur Road	Vaniyambadi	1.80	Ambur town limit
MDR21	OSM	Ammapettai - Vaduvur Road	Thanjavur, Tiruvarur	13.70	
MDR22	OSM	Anaimalai - Poolankinar Road	Pollachi, Dharapuram	32.40	
MDR23	OSM	Anaimalai Loop Road	Pollachi	7.80	
MDR27	OSM	Anjugramam Road	Nagercoil	10.30	
MDR28	OSM	Anthiyur - Ammapettai Road	Erode	17.40	
MDR29	OSM	Anthiyur - Athani Road	Erode	9.20	
MDR30	OSM	Arachalur - Sivagiri - Thamaraipalayam Road	Erode	20.60	
MDR32	OSM	Tiruvallur - Arakkonam Road	Tiruvallur, Vellore	20.80	
MDR34	OSM	Arasalar New Bridge Approach Road	Thanjavur	0.427	
MDR35	OSM	Aravakurichy - Chinnadharapuram Road	Karur	10.03	
MDR37	OSM	Aravakurichy - Pungampadi Road	Karur	6.60	MDR till 6/6, from Dindigul district border another MDR continues with origin from 6/4, overlapping between divisions.
MDR38		Arisipallayam - Cherring Cross Road		1.20	KM 2/4 to KM 3/6, upgraded as SH218
MDR40	OSM	Arni - Devikapuram Road	Cheyyar	21.20	
MDR41	OSM	Arni - Ettivadi Road	Cheyyar, Tiruvannamalai	17.70	
MDR42	OSM	Arni - Kalambur Road	Tiruvannamalai	0.80	Extension to MDR41 (KM 9/6 to KM 10/4)
MDR43	OSM	Arni - Vandavasi Road	Cheyyar	39.20	
MDR44	OSM	Arungunam Road	Cuddalore	4.40	
MDR45		Athiyuthu-Surandai road		12.00	Upgraded as SH39B
MDR46	OSM	Attaiyampatti - Masakkalipatti Road	Salem, Namakkal	12.80	
MDR48	OSM	Avaniapuram - Thirupparankundram Road	Madurai	4.80	
MDR52	OSM	Ayyampettai Railway Approach Road	Thanjavur	1.60	
MDR53		Bagalur - Berigai Road		12.00	Upgraded as SH17C
MDR54	OSM	Balamore Road	Nagercoil	20.40	KM 17/2 to KM 37/6
MDR55	OSM	Bauxite Mines Road	Salem	2.00	
MDR57	OSM	Bhavani - Kavandapady Road	Gopichettipalayam	13.60	
MDR58	OSM	Bodi - Kurangani Road	Theni	10.00	KM 6/0 to KM 16/0, till KM 6/0 it is NH
MDR59	OSM	Brahmin Burning Ghat - Vijayapuram Regulator Road	Tiruvarur	0.60	
MDR62	OSM	Thindal - Periyasemur Link Road via Villarasampatti Bypass	Erode	8.40	
MDR65	OSM	Chennai - Kovalam - Mamallapuram Road	Chengalpattu	5.60	KM 35/2 - KM 40/0 and KM 57/6 - KM 58/4
MDR66	OSM	Chennai - Ponnerikarai - Kanchipuram Road	Chengalpattu	4.50	KM 70/4 - KM 74/9
MDR70	OSM	Chennimalai - Arachalur - Kodumudi Road	Erode	13.60	
MDR71	OSM	Chennimalai - Uthukuli Road	Erode, Tiruppur	18.20	
MDR73	OSM	Chetinad Railway Feeder Road	Sivagangai	2.781	
MDR75	OSM	Cheyyar Bypass Road	Cheyyar	0.60	
MDR78		Chinnamanur - Seepalakottai Road		8.80	Upgraded as SH227
MDR80	OSM	Chunampet Road	Villupuram	3.00	
MDR81	OSM	Coimbatore - Siruvani Road	Coimbatore	29.80	MDR till KM 29/8, from there unclassified road
MDR83	OSM	College Campus Road - Karaikudi Railway Station Road	Sivagangai	1.20	
MDR84	OSM	Construction Road	Tuticorin	2.80	
MDR86	OSM	Coonoor - Kundha Road	Udhagai	26.80	MDR from KM 3/2 to KM 30/3, till KM 3/2 it is NH
MDR87	OSM	Courtallam - Five Falls Road	Tenkasi	4.00	
MDR88	OSM	Courtallam - Mathalamparai Road	Tenkasi	7.40	
MDR89	OSM	Cuddalore - Pallineliyanur Road	Cuddalore, Villupuram	17.50	MDR from KM 2/8 till KM 4/3 and from KM 7/6 till KM 23/6. KM 4/3 till KM 7/6 is under Puducherry UT.
MDR90	OSM	Cumbam - Cumbammettu Road	Theni	12.80	at KM 12/8 it is Kerala state border, road joins with SH there
MDR91	OSM	Denkanikottai - Kelamangalam - Uddanapalli Road	Krishnagiri	21.20	
MDR93	OSM	Devipattinam - Pottagavayal - Nainarkoil Road	Ramanathapuram	27.20	KM 0/0 to KM 12/8 and KM 15/8 to KM 30/2, in between it is ODR
MDR94	OSM	Dhali - Komaralingam Road	Dharapuram	16.80	
MDR95	OSM	Dharapuram Bypass Road	Dharapuram	0.40	KM 3/8 to KM 4/2, till KM 3/8 it is SH
MDR96	OSM	Dharapuram - Pollachi Road	Dharapuram	1.00	KM 0/6 to KM 1/6
MDR100	OSM	Dharmapuri - Papparapatti Road	Dharmapuri	13.20	

=== MDR 101 to MDR 200 ===
Road number	OSM relation	Name of road	Division	Length (in km)	Remarks
MDR101	OSM	East Velli Street	Madurai	0.80	
MDR103		Edappadi - Magudanchavadi Road		17.80	Upgraded as SH221
MDR104	OSM	Elumalai Road	Madurai	12.80	
MDR105	OSM	Eraniel - Muttom Road	Nagercoil	9.60	
MDR106	OSM	Eraniel - Rajakkamangalam Road	Nagercoil	9.70	KM 0/0 to KM 9/4 and KM 11/8 to KM 12/1, KM 9/4 to KM 11/8 converted to SH, from KM 12/1 it is ODR
MDR107	OSM	Eraniel - Thuckalay Road	Nagercoil	4.00	
MDR108	OSM	Erode - Chennimalai Road	Erode	24.00	
MDR109	OSM	Old Erode-Karur Road at Kodumudi town	Erode	1.40	KM 36/6 to KM 38/0
MDR110	OSM	Old Karur Road via Vendipalayam	Erode	3.30	
MDR112	OSM	Eruvadi - Thirukkurankudi Road	Tirunelveli	5.60	
MDR113	OSM	Eathenkattumadam Road	Nagercoil	12.20	
MDR114	OSM	Gangaikondan - Kuppakurichi Road	Tirunelveli	6.00	
MDR115	OSM	George Road	Tuticorin	2.40	KM 0/0 to KM 0/53 is MDR434, approximate mapping, at the end of the road SH begins.
MDR116	OSM	Gobi - Savandapur Road	Gopichettipalayam	12.60	
MDR117	OSM	Goshen Road	Dindigul	39.20	KM 23/4 to KM 62/6, till KM 23/4 it is part of another MDR, from KM 62/2 another MDR begins
MDR119	OSM	Govindasamy Arts College Road	Villupuram	4.847	
MDR120	OSM	Gowthampet Road	Vaniyambadi	0.563	KM 0/437 to KM 1/0
MDR121	OSM	Harur Bypass Road	Dharmapuri	2.40	
MDR124	OSM	Hosur Town - Hosur R.S. Road	Krishnagiri	2.00	
MDR125	OSM	Imperial Bank Road	Coimbatore	0.80	
MDR126	OSM	Iyerpadi Branch Road	Pollachi	1.00	MDR till KM 1/0, from there ODR begins
MDR130		Jayankondam - Sendurai road		25.40	Upgraded as SH217
MDR131	OSM	Kadambur - Eppodumvendran Road	Tuticorin	20.50	KM 0/0 to KM 11/0 and KM 11/7 to KM 21/2
MDR132	OSM	Kadayanallur - Valasai Road	Tenkasi	6.20	
MDR133	OSM	Kakapalayam - Attamyapatty Road	Edappadi, Salem	5.20	
MDR134	OSM	Kakkapalayam - Chinnappampatty Road	Salem, Edappadi	12.60	
MDR135	OSM	Kallakurichi - Kachirapalayam - Sankarapuram Road	Kallakurichi	35.30	
MDR143	OSM	Kancheepuram Bypass road	Chengalpattu	6.40	
MDR144	OSM	Kandambakkam Railway Feeder Road	Villupuram	1.70	
MDR147	OSM	Karaikadu Cross Road	Cuddalore	1.40	
MDR148	OSM	Karaikudi - Collage Campus Road	Sivagangai	4.035	KM 2/4 to KM 6/435
MDR149	OSM	Karatholuvu - Madathukulam - Komaralingam Road	Dharapuram	15.60	
MDR150	OSM	Karattadipalayam - Bungalowpudur Road	Gopichettipalayam	6.60	
MDR151	OSM	Karungadal - Munanjipatti Road	Tirunelveli	2.80	KM 22/0 to KM 24/8, from Tuticorin district border it is another MDR
MDR152	OSM	Karungulam - Moolakaraipatti Road	Tuticorin, Tirunelveli	15.60	
MDR154	OSM	Kasimajorpuram - Kuthukalvalasai Road	Tenkasi	1.80	
MDR155	OSM	Kattampatty - Koduvai Road	Pollachi, Tiruppur	36.60	
MDR157	OSM	Kaveripattinam – Kakankarai Road	Krishnagiri, Vaniyambadi	35.20	
MDR158	OSM	Kayalpattinam Bypass Road	Tuticorin	4.472	
MDR159	OSM	Kayathar - Kadambur Road	Tuticorin	12.20	
MDR160	OSM	Kayathar - Kalugumalai Road	Tuticorin	23.00	
MDR161	OSM	Keerapalayam - Sethiyathope Road	Cuddalore	13.60	
MDR162	OSM	Killai Road	Cuddalore	4.20	KM 7/2 to KM 11/4
MDR165	OSM	Kinathukadavu - Kattampatti Road	Pollachi	16.00	
MDR166	OSM	Pollachi - Vadakkipalayam - Nadupuni Road	Pollachi	17.40	MDR till KM 17/4, from Kerala state border it is unclassified road
MDR167	OSM	KM 15/6 of Udumalpet-Chinnar Road - Amaravathi Nagar Road	Dharapuram	5.40	
MDR168	OSM	Nazarathpet Road	Tiruvallur	1.40	MDR till KM 1/4, from Chengalpattu district border it is ODR
MDR169	OSM	KM 6/8 of Coimbatore-Siruvani Road - KM 165/8 of Salem-Cochin Road	Coimbatore	6.60	
MDR170	OSM	Kodaikanal - Cochin Road	Dindigul, Theni	53.00	KM 0/0 to KM 23/4 is for public access, KM 23/4 to KM 50/0 is unmaintained with Forest department, KM 50/0 to KM 58/4 falls within Kerala State, KM 58/4 to KM 61/4 is under Tamil Nadu for public access, from KM 61/4 at Kerala state border it is SH.
MDR171	OSM	Kodaikanal - Palani Ghat Road	Dindigul, Palani	39.60	
MDR175	OSM	Kodivery Dam Road	Gopichettipalayam	2.00	
MDR176	OSM	Kovilpatti Junction - Pudukkottai District Border Road	Sivagangai	11.21	at Pudukottai District border SH201 terminates
MDR177	OSM	Koilpatti - Manapparai Road	Trichy	12.20	
MDR178	OSM	Kokkirakulam - Nanguneri Road	Tirunelveli	5.80	KM 4/0 to KM 9/8
MDR180	OSM	Kollegal - Hassanur Road	Gopichettipalayam	25.80	MDR from KM 52/4 to 78/2, till Karnataka state border it is SH
MDR181	OSM	Kolli Hills Ghat Road	Namakkal	22.00	
MDR182		Komarapalayam - Eadapadi Road		25.60	Upgraded as SH221
MDR183	OSM	Koradachery Railway Feeder Road	Tiruvarur	0.40	
MDR185	OSM	Kottaiyur - Aranthangi Road	Sivagangai	10.804	KM 5/6 to KM 16/404, till KM 5/6 upgraded as NH, from Pudukottai District border at KM 16/404 it is ODR
MDR186	OSM	Kottakuppam Road	Villupuram	1.40	
MDR187	OSM	Kottar - Dharmapuram Road	Nagercoil	8.10	
MDR188	OSM	Kottar - Manakudy Road	Nagercoil	8.30	KM 0/0 to KM 7/6 and KM 10/2 to KM 10/9, KM 7/6 to KM 10/2 converted to SH
MDR191	OSM	Kovilpatti Bypass Road	Tuticorin	1.00	
MDR192		Krishnagiri - Rayakottai road		30.80	Upgraded as SH225
MDR193	OSM	KRP Dam Approach Road	Krishnagiri	2.80	
MDR194	OSM	Krishnankovil - Koomapatti Road	Virudhunagar	14.80	
MDR195	OSM	Kulasekaramangalam - Valasai Road	Tenkasi	10.40	
MDR196	OSM	Kulathupuzha Chowkey Road	Tenkasi	8.20	
MDR197	OSM	Kulathur - Viralimalai Road	Trichy	6.00	
MDR198	OSM	Kulavanigarpuram - Kurichi Road	Tirunelveli	2.03	
MDR199	OSM	Kullanchavady - Kattugudalore Road	Cuddalore	26.475	
MDR200	OSM	Kullanchavady Cross Road	Cuddalore	6.31	

=== MDR 201 to MDR 300 ===
Road number	OSM relation	Name of road	Division	Length (in km)	Remarks
MDR201	OSM	Kumaratchi - Puliyangudi Road	Cuddalore	7.40	
MDR205	OSM	Kumbakonam - Kollidakkarai Road	Thanjavur	8.80	
MDR206	OSM	Kumbakonam Railway Station - Old Cauvery Bridge Road	Thanjavur	2.80	KM 0/4 to KM 3/2
MDR209	OSM	Kunnakudi - Kanadukathan Road	Sivagangai	9.80	KM 11/2 to KM 20/6 and KM 23/2 to KM 23/6. KM 20/6 to KM 23/2 is upgraded as NH.
MDR210	OSM	Kunnakudi Devasthanam Road	Sivagangai	0.195	
MDR211	OSM	Kuthalam - Komal Road	Nagapattinam	10.00	
MDR212		Kuthukalvalasai-Panpozhi-Thirumalaikoil road		9.60	KM 3/6 to KM 13/2, upgraded as SH43
MDR213	OSM	Kuttalam - Panthanallur Road	Nagapattinam, Thanjavur	9.80	
MDR214	OSM	Koothur Railway Feeder Road	Nagapattinam	1.60	
MDR216	OSM	Kuzhithurai - Thengapattinam Road	Nagercoil	7.50	KM 0/0 to KM 7/0 and KM 11/0 to KM 11/5, KM 7/0 to KM 11/0 upgraded to SH
MDR217	OSM	Lake Bridge - Observatory Road	Dindigul	4.00	
MDR220	OSM	Link Road	Tuticorin	2.08	Approximate alignment
MDR221	OSM	Kongampalayam - Rayapalayam Link Road connecting Erode-Sathy Road with Old Salem-Cochin NH	Erode	1.40	
MDR222	OSM	Udumalpet-Chinnadharapuram Road - Palani-Dharapuram Road Link Road	Dharapuram	0.60	
MDR224	OSM	Ma.Po.C. Road	Tiruvallur	0.80	
MDR226	OSM	Madhukkur - Pattukkottai Road	Thanjavur	11.00	KM 59/0 to KM 70/0
MDR227	OSM	Madurai - Palamedu Road	Madurai	18.20	KM 6/2 to KM 24/4, till KM 6/2 it is SH
MDR231	OSM	Old Madurai - Thondi Road	Sivagangai	1.60	KM 72/4 to KM 74/0
MDR232	OSM	Madurai - Thondi Road	Madurai	5.00	KM 12/8 to KM 17/8, from Sivagangai district border another MDR continues
MDR233	OSM	Old Madurai - Kanyakumari Road	Tirunelveli	0.38	KM 149/5 to KM 149/88
MDR234		Madurai - Melakkal Road		13.00	KM 4/0 to KM 17/0, upgraded as SH73A
MDR237	OSM	Mallapuram - Mookanur Road	Dharmapuri	18.80	
MDR238	OSM	Malligundam - Koonandiyur Road	Edappadi	6.634	
MDR239	OSM	Mamallapuram - Kokilamedu Road	Chengalpattu	3.00	
MDR240	OSM	Managiri - Kallal - Madagupatti Road	Sivagangai	15.084	KM 11/6 to KM 26/684, till KM 11/6 upgraded to SH
MDR243	OSM	Mangalrevu - Elumalai Road	Madurai	22.40	
MDR244	OSM	Mannachanallur - Edumalai - Elanthalaipatty Road	Trichy, Perambalur	29.80	
MDR245	OSM	Mannargudy - Eyyalur Road	Cuddalore	10.20	
MDR246	OSM	Mannargudi - Thiruthuraipoondi Road	Tiruvarur	1.40	
MDR248	OSM	Mannargudi - Orathanadu - Thiruvonam Road	Tiruvarur, Thanjavur	38.80	KM 4/8 to KM 43/6
MDR249	OSM	Mariyammankoil Railway Approach Road	Thanjavur	1.20	
MDR250	OSM	Marthandam - Karungal Road	Nagercoil	6.80	
MDR252	OSM	Mathalankulam Street	Tiruvannamalai	0.60	
MDR255	OSM	Mavoor - Sattiyakkudy Road	Tiruvarur, Nagapattinam	7.20	
MDR256	OSM	Mayiladuthurai - Muthupet Road	Tiruvarur	3.60	KM 69/0 to KM 72/6, KM 91/8 to KM 94/2 section of 2.40 KMs modified as MDR1054
MDR257	OSM	Mayiladuthurai - Pattavarthi Road	Nagapattinam	13.00	KM 0/2 to KM 13/2
MDR258	OSM	Mayiladuthurai Rail Over Bridge Service Road	Nagapattinam	1.00	
MDR259	OSM	Mayiladuthurai - Pattavarthy Road (town limit)	Nagapattinam	0.600	KM 0/6 to KM 1/2
MDR261	OSM	Meingnanapuram - Munanjipatti Road	Tuticorin	22.80	from Tirunelveli district border it is another MDR
MDR262	OSM	Melakkal - Peranai Road	Madurai, Dindigul	21.00	KM 17/4 to KM 38/4
MDR263	OSM	Melpattampakkam Railway Feeder Road	Cuddalore	0.20	
MDR266	OSM	Melur - Poovanthi - Thiruppuvanam Road	Madurai, Sivagangai	20.839	KM 0/0 to KM 19/4 and KM 19/564 to 21/003, from KM 21/003 road converted to NH
MDR267	OSM	Memathur Channel Bund Road	Cuddalore	6.20	ODR joins at KM 6/2
MDR268		Mettur-Palar Road		29.40	Upgraded as SH20A
MDR269	OSM	Meycode - Kulasekaram Road	Nagercoil	7.20	
MDR270	OSM	Mohanur - Valayapatti Road	Namakkal	13.60	
MDR271	OSM	Morappur - Karimangalam - Marandahalli Road	Dharmapuri	54.40	
MDR272	OSM	Mudhanai Road	Cuddalore	8.00	ODR joins at KM 8/0
MDR273	OSM	Mudukulathur - Kamuthi Road	Ramanathapuram	18.40	
MDR275	OSM	Mundiyampakkam Railway Feeder Road	Villupuram	0.20	
MDR276	OSM	Musiri - Pulivalam Road	Trichy	24.00	
MDR277	OSM	Musiri - Thathaiyangarpettai - Eragudy - Murugur Road	Trichy	40.805	
MDR278	OSM	Muthanendal Railway Feeder Road	Sivagangai	0.053	Approximate road chosen
MDR280	OSM	Mylampatty - Palayam Road	Karur	10.80	MDR till 10/8, from Dindigul district border another MDR terminates
MDR282	OSM	Nagalur - Puthur Road	Salem	3.60	
MDR283	OSM	Nagapattinam - Velaganni Road	Nagapattinam	1.20	KM 1/2 to KM 2/4
MDR285	OSM	Nainamalai - Sendamangalam Road	Namakkal	8.60	
MDR286	OSM	Nallur - Kayalpattinam Road	Tuticorin	3.80	
MDR287	OSM	Nalli Railway Station Road	Virudhunagar	1.80	from KM 1/8 an ODR begins
MDR291	OSM	Nanguneri - Kalakad Road	Tirunelveli	11.00	
MDR292	OSM	Nanguneri - Moolaikaraipatti Road	Tirunelveli	14.20	
MDR293	OSM	Nanjundapuram - Naducombai Road	Namakkal	8.00	
MDR294	OSM	New Austinpatti Road	Madurai	2.00	
MDR295	OSM	Neyveli - Valayamadevi Road	Cuddalore	8.60	Intermediate section is closed for NLC mines operations.
MDR296	OSM	Kothandaramasamy Koil Road	Ramanathapuram	0.90	
MDR297	OSM	North High Ground Road	Tirunelveli	2.70	
MDR298	OSM	Observatory - Pillar Rock Road	Dindigul	1.20	
MDR299	OSM	Okkur - Keelapoongudi Road	Sivagangai	11.493	KM 13/19 to KM 24/683
MDR300	OSM	Okkur - Nattarasankottai Road	Sivagangai	8.531	

=== MDR 301 to MDR 400 ===
Road number	OSM relation	Name of road	Division	Length (in km)	Remarks
MDR301	OSM	Olakkur Railway Feeder Road	Villupuram	2.40	
MDR302	OSM	Old Austinpatti Road	Madurai	2.00	
MDR303	OSM	Old Courtallam Falls Road	Tenkasi	2.40	
MDR304		Old Cuddalore-Chidambaram road		3.20	KM 34/0 to KM 37/2, upgraded as NH45A
MDR305	OSM	Madurai - Thondi Road	Sivagangai	1.40	KM 17/8 to KM 19/2
MDR306	OSM	Thriuverumbur - Grandanaicut Road	Trichy, Thanjavur	9.40	
MDR307		Omalur-Mecheri Road		14.60	Upgraded as SH222
MDR308		Palacode - Nagadasampatti road		21.00	Upgraded as SH224
MDR310	OSM	Palani Adivaram -Thekkanthottam Road	Palani	12.185	KM 0/0 to KM 0/972 and KM 1/987 to KM 13/2, at KM 13/2 another MDR terminates
MDR311	N/A	Palayamkottai Bus Stand - Tiruchendur Road	Tirunelveli	0.13	KM 3/67 to KM 3/8, unable to identify the road segment
MDR312	OSM	Palayam - Madukkarai Road	Palani	2.20	MDR till 2/2, at Karur district border another MDR terminates
MDR313	OSM	Palayam - Servaikaranpatti Road	Palani	3.20	At KM 3/2 another MDR terminates
MDR314	OSM	Palayamkottai - Thiruthu Road	Tirunelveli	11.40	
MDR315	OSM	Palayamkottai - Tiruchendur Road	Tirunelveli	0.20	KM 4/2 to KM 4/4
MDR319		Pallavaram-Kundrathur Road		6.80	KM 1/0 to KM 7/8, upgraded as 113A
MDR322	OSM	Panchalam Railway Feeder Road	Villupuram	0.20	
MDR324	OSM	Pandikanmai Railway Feeder Road	Ramanathapuram	0.40	
MDR325	OSM	Pannaikadu - Mangalamcombu Road	Dindigul	8.40	KM 3/6 to KM 12/0
MDR326	OSM	Pannaikadu Road	Dindigul	3.60	
MDR328	OSM	Pappireddipatti - Mallapuram Road	Dharmapuri	19.00	
MDR328A	OSM	Pappireddipatti - Pallipatti - Thenkaraikottai - Morappur Road	Dharmapuri	30.00	
MDR329		Paramakudi - Mudukulathur Road to Vilathur Road		2.60	Merged with MDR548
MDR330	OSM	Paramankurichi - Tiruchendur Road	Tuticorin	8.40	
MDR331	OSM	Paramankurichi - Udangudi Road	Tuticorin	6.80	
MDR332	OSM	Paramathy - Noyyal Road	Karur	10.60	
MDR333	OSM	Paramathy - Rajapuram Road	Karur	13.682	
MDR334	OSM	Parasalai - Panachamoodu Road	Nagercoil	2.60	KM 2/4 to KM 5/0, runs between two Kerala borders
MDR336	OSM	Parikkal - Periyasevalai Road	Kallakurichi	12.40	
MDR337	OSM	Parisalthurai Road	Trichy	0.70	
MDR338	OSM	Parthibanur Railway Feeder Road	Ramanathapuram	2.60	
MDR339	OSM	Parthibanoor - Vilathur Road	Ramanathapuram	12.80	
MDR340	OSM	Pasupathikoil Railway Approach Road	Thanjavur	1.20	
MDR341	OSM	Patchalur- Vadakadu - Oddanchatram Road	Palani	31.60	
MDR342	OSM	Pattukkottai - Adirampattinam Road	Thanjavur	11.60	KM 47/2 to KM 58/8
MDR343	OSM	Pattukkottai - Muthupettai Road	Thanjavur	17.20	KM 46/2 to KM 63/4
MDR345	OSM	Pei Gopuram Road	Tiruvannamalai	1.60	
MDR346	OSM	Peikulam - Perungulam Road	Tuticorin	9.60	
MDR347		Pennagaram - Perumbalai - Mecheri Road		9.080	KM 34/4 to KM 43/48, upgraded as SH222
MDR348		Pennagaram - Perumbalai Road		34.40	Upgraded as SH222
MDR349	OSM	Pennagaram Bypass Road	Dharmapuri	2.60	
MDR351	OSM	Peralam - Karaikkal Road	Tiruvarur	7.40	KM 0/0 to KM 6/8 and KM 8/0 to KM 8/6, remaining falls into Puducherry UT.
MDR354	OSM	Old Valparai - Sholayar - Chalakkudy Road	Pollachi	19.20	MDR till KM 19/2, from Kerala state border it is SH.
MDR355	OSM	Perumal Tank Bund Road	Cuddalore	14.60	chainage from KM 16/6 to KM 31/2
MDR357	OSM	Perundurai - Maccanamcombai Road	Erode, Gopichettipalayam	38.80	
MDR358	OSM	Petmanagaram - Vagaikulam Road	Tuticorin	12.00	
MDR359	OSM	Pettai - Thiruvengadanathapuram Road	Tirunelveli	1.60	
MDR361	OSM	Podanur Junction Road	Coimbatore	2.60	
MDR362	OSM	Pollachi Bypass road	Pollachi	2.60	
MDR365	OSM	KM 103/10 of Pondy-Krishnagiri Road - KM 54/2 of Villupuram-Tiruvannamalai Road	Tiruvannamalai	1.20	
MDR366	OSM	Pondy - Krishnagiri Road	Krishnagiri	0.955	KM 243/045 to KM 244/0
MDR367	OSM	Ponparappi Bypass Road	Ariyalur	2.10	KM 15/7 - KM 16/3 and KM 16/7 - KM 18/2
MDR368	OSM	Ponnamallee - Avadi Road	Tiruvallur	0.60	KM 8/0 - KM 8/6
MDR369		Ponnamallee - Kundrathur Road		5.20	Upgraded as SH113A
MDR370	OSM	Poonthottam - Nachiyarkoil Road	Tiruvarur, Thanjavur	25.40	
MDR371	OSM	Poovalur - Siruganur - Thirupattur Road	Trichy	25.60	
MDR372	OSM	Pudukkottai - Pattukottai Road	Pudukkottai, Thanjavur	28.07	KM 19/33 to KM 47/4
MDR374	OSM	Puduchathiram Railway Feeder Road	Cuddalore	1.00	
MDR375	OSM	Pudukkottai - South Kulathur Road	Pudukkottai	8.00	KM 42/8 to KM 50/8
MDR376	OSM	Pudupatti - Mangalrevu Road	Madurai	13.80	
MDR377	OSM	Pudupatti - Nedungudi Road	Pudukkottai	4.20	MDR till Sivagangai district border, then unclassified.
MDR378	OSM	Puduvoyal - Periyapalayam Road	Tiruvallur	12.00	
MDR379	OSM	Puduvoyal – Pulicut Road	Tiruvallur	6.20	
MDR380	OSM	Pullambadi - Sirugalappur - Padalur Road	Trichy	23.60	
MDR383	OSM	Chidambaram - Puthur Road	Cuddalore	15.40	
MDR384	OSM	Puttuthakku Causeway Road	Vellore	5.40	
MDR387	OSM	Rajapalayam - Ayyanarkovil Road	Virudhunagar	13.00	
MDR389	OSM	Ramanathapuram - Devipattinam Road	Ramanathapuram	0.40	KM 15/2 to KM 15/6, un till KM 15/2 upgraded as NH/SH
MDR390	OSM	Ramanathapuram - Nainarkoil - Emaneswaram Road	Ramanathapuram	9.60	KM 30/2 to KM 39/8, till KM 30/2 upgraded to SH
MDR391	OSM	Ramanathapuram - Keelakkarai Road	Ramanathapuram	5.00	KM 0/4 to KM 4/0 and KM 15/8 to KM 17/2, in between upgraded to NH.
MDR393	OSM	Ramanathapuram Railway Feeder Road	Ramanathapuram	0.80	KM 0/8 to KM 1/6
MDR394	OSM	Rameswaram Railway Feeder Road	Ramanathapuram	0.30	
MDR395	OSM	South Car Street	Ramanathapuram	0.40	
MDR396	OSM	Chinnakadai Road	Ramanathapuram	0.40	
MDR397	OSM	East Car Street	Ramanathapuram	0.20	
MDR398	OSM	Middle Car Street	Ramanathapuram	0.40	
MDR399	OSM	North Car Street	Ramanathapuram	0.40	
MDR400	OSM	West Car Street	Ramanathapuram	0.20	

=== MDR 401 to MDR 500 ===
Road number	OSM relation	Name of road	Division	Length (in km)	Remarks
MDR401		Ranipet - Sholinghur Road		10.60	Upgraded as SH61A
MDR402	OSM	Rasipuram - Attur Road	Namakkal	3.65	
MDR403	OSM	Reddiyarpatti - Vijayanarayanam Road	Tirunelveli	40.800	
MDR404	OSM	Palladam Town Road	Tiruppur	0.60	
MDR406	OSM	Salavathy Road	Villupuram	2.00	
MDR407	OSM	Saliyamangalam - Papanasam Road	Thanjavur	16.40	
MDR408	OSM	Sankarankoil - Thiruvenkadam Road	Tenkasi	17.76	
MDR409	OSM	Sankarankovil - Veerasigamani Road	Tenkasi	15.40	
MDR411	OSM	Sannathi Ramalinganar Street	Tiruvannamalai	0.80	
MDR412	OSM	Santhapuram Road	Nagercoil	12.40	
MDR413	OSM	Sarugani - Devakottai Road	Sivagangai	15.48	
MDR414	OSM	Sathirakudi Railway Feeder Road	Ramanathapuram	0.40	
MDR416	OSM	Seelaipillaiyarputhur - Kattuputhur - Namakkal Road	Trichy	10.80	MDR till KM 10/8, at Namakkal district border another MDR terminates
MDR417	OSM	Selekarachal - Sulthanpet Road	Coimbatore, Pollachi	11.60	
MDR418	OSM	Servaikaranpatti - Aravakurichi Road	Palani	18.20	MDR from KM 6/4 to KM 24/6, at Karur district border another MDR terminates with chainage of KM 6/6, overlapping between divisions, at KM 24/6 another MDR terminates.
MDR419	OSM	Service Road	Tirunelveli	0.90	
MDR421	OSM	Shevapet - Elampillai Road	Salem	17.20	
MDR422	OSM	Shoolagiri - Berigai Road	Krishnagiri	22.00	MDR till KM 22/0, at Andhra Pradesh border another road joins
MDR424		Singarapet - Thirupathur Road		13.20	KM 16/4 to KM 29/6, upgraded as SH18A
MDR425	OSM	Sirkali - Panangattangudi Road	Nagapattinam	9.80	
MDR426	OSM	Sirkali - Thirumullaivasal - Koolaiyar Road	Nagapattinam	19.00	
MDR430	OSM	Sivakasi - Kalugumalai Road	Tenkasi	2.60	KM 21/0 to KM 23/6, another SH terminates at Tenkasi District border
MDR431	OSM	Sivaramapettai - Panpozhi - Shencottai Road	Tenkasi	15.40	
MDR431A	OSM	Kadayanallur - Achampudur Road	Tenkasi	6.40	
MDR432		Solathiram-Srimushnam road		20.00	Upgraded as SH216
MDR433	OSM	South Arcot Frontier Road	Chengalpattu	4.20	
MDR434	OSM	South Beach Road	Tuticorin	0.53	
MDR435	OSM	Srivaikuntam - Pudukkottai Road	Tuticorin	17.22	
MDR436	OSM	Girder Bridge Road	Tuticorin	0.40	
MDR437	OSM	Sulur - Selekarchal Road	Coimbatore	11.00	
MDR438	OSM	Sulur Railway Feeder Road	Coimbatore	5.60	
MDR439	OSM	Suramangalam - Tharamangalam Road	Salem	11.10	Old chainage KM 5/7 to KM 23/8, KM 16/8 to KM 23/8 upgraded as SH219 and chainage altered to KM 0/0 to KM 11/10.
MDR440		Surandai-Senthamaram Road		10.87	KM 12/0 to KM 22/87, upgraded as SH39B
MDR440A	OSM	Idaikal - Sendamaram Road	Tenkasi	12.80	
MDR441	OSM	Swamimalai - Patteeswaram Road	Thanjavur	4.20	
MDR442		Tenkasi Loop Road		0.80	Upgraded as SH43
MDR446	OSM	Thambikottai Railway Approach Road	Thanjavur	0.80	
MDR447		Thandalam - Perambakkam - Thakkolam - Arugilpadi Road		39.40	Upgraded as SH50B
MDR449	OSM	Thanjavur - Pattukkottai Road	Thanjavur	2.80	Orathanadu urban stretch (KM 21/2 to KM 24/0)
MDR451		Tharamangalam - Jalagandapuram Road		10.00	Upgraded as SH219A
MDR452	OSM	Tharamani - Perungudi Road	Chennai City Roads	2.01	
MDR453	OSM	Tharangampadi - Mayiladuthurai Road	Nagapattinam	18.40	KM 11/2 to KM 29/6
MDR454	OSM	Thazhanallur Railway Feeder Road	Cuddalore	4.80	
MDR455	OSM	Thedavoor - Thammampatty Road	Salem	24.60	
MDR456		Theertham - Berigai road		18.20	Upgraded as SH226
MDR460	OSM	Trichy - Chidambaram Byepass Road	Trichy	1.80	
MDR461	OSM	Trichy - Kulumani - Jeeyapuram Road	Trichy	16.40	
MDR461A	OSM	Konarchathiram/Pandamangalam - Perur - Kulumani Road	Trichy	11.30	Road is of two segments KM 0 to KM 2/7 from Konarchathiram and KM 2/7 to KM 11/3 from Pandamangalam
MDR462	OSM	Thirukazhukundram Bypass Road	Chengalpattu	5.40	
MDR466	OSM	Thirumathikunnam Railway Feeder Road	Tiruvarur	2.60	
MDR467	OSM	Thirunellikkaval - Kolappadu - Karunganni Road	Nagapattinam, Tiruvarur	19.42	KM 0/0 to KM 12/2, KM 12/38 to 19/6
MDR468	OSM	Thirupachur - Kadambattur - Kondancheri Road	Tiruvallur	12.50	
MDR469	OSM	Thirupparankundram Town Road	Madurai	1.40	
MDR472	OSM	Thiruppananthal - Aduthurai Road	Thanjavur	10.20	KM 0/2 to KM 10/4
MDR477	OSM	KM 33/6 of East Coast Road to Muttukadu Picturesque Beauty Spot Road	Chengalpattu	0.84	
MDR479	OSM	Thisayanvilai - Udangudi Road	Tirunelveli, Tuticorin	22.80	
MDR480	OSM	Thittachery - Thirumalarayanpattinam Road	Nagapattinam	3.40	
MDR482	OSM	Thogamalai - Mylampatty Road	Karur	18.80	
MDR484	OSM	Thoothukudi - Tharuvaikulam Road	Tuticorin	6.80	
MDR486	OSM	Bhavani - Vellithiruppur Road	Erode	18.20	
MDR487	OSM	Thottiyam - Kattuputhur Road	Trichy	13.80	
MDR488	OSM	Thuckalay - Thadikarankonam Road	Nagercoil	8.60	
MDR489	OSM	Thudiyalur - Kovilpalayam Road	Coimbatore	15.40	
MDR490	OSM	Thirumazhisai - Sathyavedu Road	Tiruvallur	1.20	KM 44/0 - KM 45/2
MDR491	OSM	Thuraimangalam Bungalow Road	Perambalur	1.40	
MDR496	OSM	Tiruchendur - Kulasai - Udangudi Road	Tuticorin	4.766	KM 13/4 to KM 18/166
MDR499	OSM	Thirukovilur Railway Feeder Road	Kallakurichi	1.00	

=== MDR 501 to MDR 600 ===
Road number	OSM relation	Name of road	Division	Length (in km)	Remarks
MDR503	OSM	Tiruvannamalai - Kanji Road	Tiruvannamalai	21.60	
MDR505	OSM	Thiruvathipuram - Arni Road	Cheyyar	30.40	
MDR506	OSM	Tiruchengode Bypass Road	Namakkal	1.40	
MDR508	OSM	Udaiyarpatti - Seevalaperi Road	Tirunelveli	16.60	
MDR509	OSM	Udumalpet - Chinnar Road	Dharapuram	28.80	MDR till KM 28/8, from Kerala state border it is SH
MDR510	OSM	Udumalpet - Komaralingam Road	Dharapuram	18.80	MDR till KM 18/8, from Dindigul district border another MDR terminates
MDR511	OSM	Udumalpet - Senjeri Hills Road	Dharapuram, Pollachi	28.20	
MDR512	OSM	Udumalpet - Thirumoorthi Hills Road	Dharapuram	13.80	KM 7/0 to KM 20/8, till KM 7/0 another MDR exists.
MDR513	OSM	Ulundurpet Railway Feeder Road	Kallakurichi	0.40	
MDR516	OSM	Uthamapalayam Town Road	Theni	1.20	
MDR517	OSM	Uthangarai Bypass Road	Krishnagiri	1.20	
MDR518	OSM	Uthiramerur - Kammalampoondi - Acharapakkam Road	Chengalpattu	18.40	Ends at SH-115 Cheyyur-Vandavasi Road
MDR520	OSM	Uthiyur - Kundadam Road	Tiruppur, Dharapuram	10.60	
MDR521	OSM	Uthukuli R.S. - Uthukuli Town Road	Tiruppur	2.40	
MDR522	OSM	Vadachittur - Chettipalayam Road	Pollachi	11.80	
MDR523	OSM	Vadachittur - Negamam Road	Pollachi	10.80	
MDR525	OSM	Vadavalam - Pudupatti Road	Pudukkottai	24.80	KM 8/8 to KM 33/6
MDR526	OSM	Vaigai Causeway Approach Road	Madurai	0.80	
MDR530	OSM	Valapady - Thimmanaickenpatty Road	Salem	10.60	
MDR531	OSM	Valayapatti - Andapuram Road	Namakkal	7.40	MDR till KM 7/4, at Trichy district border another MDR terminates
MDR532	OSM	Vallam - Orathanadu Road	Thanjavur	21.60	
MDR533	OSM	Vallampadugai Railway Feeder Road	Cuddalore	0.40	
MDR534	OSM	Valparai - Manicka Kurangumudi Road	Pollachi	10.20	
MDR536	OSM	Varakkalpattu Railway Feeder Road	Cuddalore	0.10	
MDR540	OSM	Vedanthangal Road	Chengalpattu	12.60	
MDR541	OSM	Verakeralampudur - Shanmuganallur Road	Tenkasi	28.60	
MDR542	OSM	Veeranam Tank Bund Road	Cuddalore	14.40	
MDR543		Velachery Bye Pass Road		1.90	Upgraded as SH48C
MDR544	OSM	Velankanni - Thiruthuraipoondi Road	Tiruvarur	1.40	KM 38/8 to KM 40/2
MDR545	OSM	Velayuthampalayam - Noyyal Road	Karur	10.708	KM 17/2 to KM 27/908
MDR546		Vellore Municipal Bypass Road		1.20	Upgraded as SH230
MDR547	OSM	Velur - Mohanur Road	Namakkal	16.20	
MDR548	OSM	Melayakudi - Vilathur - Muthaneri Road	Ramanathapuram	15.45	
MDR552	OSM	Vridhachalam East and North Fort Street	Cuddalore	0.40	
MDR553	OSM	Vridhachalam Good Shed Road	Cuddalore	0.50	
MDR554	OSM	Vridhachalam Railway Feeder Road	Cuddalore	0.50	
MDR555	OSM	Walajah Railway Station Road	Vellore	3.20	Extension to SH61 (KM 1/0 to 4/2)
MDR559	OSM	Thiruppuvanam West Car Street	Sivagangai	0.10	Approximate road chosen
MDR560	OSM	Yelagiri Hill Road	Vaniyambadi	14.40	
MDR561	OSM	Yercaud - Vaniyar Road	Salem	7.20	
MDR563	OSM	Yercaud Loop Road	Salem	33.60	
MDR564	OSM	Abdullapuram - Moranam Road	Cheyyar	24.25	
MDR565	OSM	Acharapakkam - Periyakalakadi Road	Chengalpattu	15.00	
MDR566	OSM	Agaramthen - Kovilanchery Road	Chennai City Roads	7.10	
MDR568	OSM	Sholavandan - Andipatti - Valayapatti Road	Madurai	30.00	MDR till 30/0, from there it is ODR
MDR570	OSM	Andipatty - Theppampatti - Velappar Kovil Road	Theni	18.00	
MDR571	OSM	Annur - Sirumugai Road	Coimbatore	16.75	
MDR572	OSM	Arakkonam - Melpakkam Road	Vellore	2.40	
MDR574	OSM	Puthambur - Venjamangudular - Pungambadi Road	Karur	16.19	
MDR575	OSM	Avadi - Vaniyanchatiram Road	Tiruvallur	10.40	KM 1/6 - KM 12/0
MDR575A	OSM	Vellanur - Red Hills Road	Tiruvallur	9.00	
MDR576	OSM	Azhampoondy - Mazhavanthangal Road	Villupuram	22.50	
MDR577	OSM	Banavaram - Sendhamangalam - Ganapathipuram Road	Vellore	27.60	
MDR578	OSM	Brammadesam - Kiliyanur - Ranganathapuram Road	Villupuram	20.20	
MDR579	OSM	KM 43/2 of NH49 - Kattanoor Road	Sivagangai, Virudhunagar	22.883	
MDR580	OSM	Veeramangalam - Mahankalikapuram - Ammayarkuppam Road	Tiruvallur	11.60	
MDR581	OSM	Chengalpattu - Thiruporur Road	Chengalpattu	21.80	
MDR582	OSM	Cheyyar Anaicut Road	Cheyyar	19.20	
MDR583	OSM	Chidambaram - Keelnatham - Veeranam Tank Bund Road	Cuddalore	16.80	
MDR584	OSM	Chinnadharapuram - Kodumudi Road	Karur	21.00	MDR till 21/0, from Erode district border it is ODR
MDR585	OSM	Chitharasur Road	Cuddalore	4.90	
MDR586	OSM	Thondamuthur - Madampatty Road	Coimbatore	3.20	
MDR587	OSM	Cumbam - Kamayagowndanpatty Road	Theni	3.60	
MDR588	OSM	Denkanikottai - Anchety - Natrampalayam Road	Krishnagiri	43.00	Begins at SH termination point, runs till KM 43/0, then it is unclassified road
MDR589	OSM	Dharumathupatty - Adalur - Thandigudi Road	Dindigul	45.00	
MDR590	OSM	Dindigul - Manakkattur Road	Dindigul	30.82	
MDR591		Edappady - Poolampatty - Mettur RS Road		12.935	Upgraded as SH220A
MDR592	OSM	Edward Memorial Road (Girivalapathai)	Namakkal	3.20	
MDR593	OSM	Ilayangudi - Vandal - Sukkirapatti Road	Sivagangai, Ramanathapuram	42.40	
MDR594	OSM	Gajalnaickenpatty - Panamarathupatty - Seshanchavadi Road	Salem	38.09	
MDR596	OSM	GST Road - Padalam - Cheyyur Road	Chengalpattu	32.00	
MDR597	OSM	GST Road - Arungal - Nallambakkam Road	Chengalpattu	12.40	
MDR598	OSM	Guduvancheri - Kottamedu Road	Chengalpattu	17.60	
MDR599	OSM	Gummidipoondi – Madarapakkam Road	Tiruvallur	16.85	
MDR599A	OSM	Nagarajakandigai - Sirupuzhalpettai Road	Tiruvallur	8.00	
MDR600		Jeyamangalam - Eluvanampatti Road		8.425	Merged with MDR903

=== MDR 601 to MDR 700 ===
Road number	OSM relation	Name of road	Division	Length (in km)	Remarks
MDR601	OSM	Akkarapakkam - Thirunilai - Arani Road	Tiruvallur	7.70	
MDR602	OSM	Kadampuliyur - Sendanadu - Ulundurpet Road	Cuddalore, Kallakurichi	30.20	
MDR603	OSM	Kalagam - Avudayarkoil Road	Thanjavur, Pudukkottai	36.20	
MDR604	OSM	Kanniseri - Mathiyasenai Road	Virudhunagar	15.60	
MDR605	OSM	Karamadai - Tholampalayam Road	Coimbatore	16.60	MDR till KM 16/6, then unclassified road continues
MDR606	OSM	Karur - Esanatham - Koombur - Vedasandur Road	Karur, Palani	51.225	KM 0/0 to KM 35/8 and 35/625 to 51.225, section KM 35/625 to KM 35/8 is overlapping between divisions.
MDR607	OSM	Katpadi - Vallimalai Road	Vellore	19.60	
MDR608	OSM	Keelapalur - Thirumalapadi - Pullambadi Road	Ariyalur, Trichy	34.00	
MDR609	OSM	Kodavasal - Koradachery - Koothanallur - Mavoor Road	Tiruvarur	35.60	
MDR610	OSM	Kodungaiyur – Vazhudhugaimedu Road	Tiruvallur	8.80	
MDR611	OSM	Koduvai - Nachipalayam Road	Tiruppur	17.20	
MDR612		Koduvilarpatti - S.Alagapuri - Seelayampatti Road		23.255	Upgraded as SH228
MDR613	OSM	Kokkulam - Uthappanaickanur Road	Madurai	29.20	
MDR616	OSM	Krishnamanayakkanthoppu Road	Theni	0.70	KM 7/9 to KM 8/6, KM 1/6 to KM 7/9 modified as MDR1168
MDR618	OSM	Kunnam - Veppur - Vayalapadi Road	Perambalur	18.80	
MDR619	OSM	Kurinjipady - Palur Road	Cuddalore	21.30	
MDR620	OSM	M.Kunnathur - Naripalayam Road	Kallakurichi	20.30	
MDR621	OSM	M.Reddiapatti - Salukkuvarpatti - Thoppalakarai Road	Virudhunagar	17.40	
MDR622	OSM	Madipakkam - Velachery Road	Chennai City Roads	3.20	
MDR623	OSM	Madukkarai - Chettipalayam Road	Coimbatore	12.60	
MDR625	OSM	Mahadhanapuram - Panjapatty - Tharagampatti Road	Karur	33.671	
MDR626	OSM	Mailam - Karattai Road	Villupuram	23.10	
MDR627	OSM	Manamadurai - T.Pudukkottai - Paramakudi Road	Sivagangai	24.80	
MDR628	OSM	Manapparai -Tharagampatti- Gujiliamparai Road	Trichy, Karur, Palani	34.00	Road begins on the outskirts of Manapparai
MDR629	OSM	Manjanaickenpatty - Kallimandayam Road	Palani	18.00	
MDR631	OSM	Mariamman Kovil - Fathimanagar Road	Virudhunagar	1.50	
MDR632	OSM	Mayanur - Sengal - Panchapatty Road	Karur	16.555	
MDR633		Medavakkam - Mambakkam - Sembakkam Road		26.80	Upgraded as SH110A
MDR634	OSM	Medur - Gummidipoondi Road	Tiruvallur	23.20	
MDR635		Mount - Medavakkam Road		9.10	Upgraded as SH48A
MDR636	OSM	Mudukarai - Kadalur Road	Chengalpattu	28.80	
MDR637	OSM	Mudukulathur - Uthiragosamangai Road	Ramanathapuram	26.60	
MDR638	OSM	Mudukulathur - Veerasolam - KM 99/4 of SH42 Road	Ramanathapuram, Virudhunagar	35.725	
MDR640	OSM	Muthupet - Voimedu Road	Tiruvarur, Nagapattinam	23.10	
MDR642	OSM	N.C.Veeralore Road	Tiruvannamalai	18.40	
MDR643	OSM	Natchikulam - Nilakottai - Sempatti Road	Dindigul	29.60	Road ends with KM 10/0 chainage joining the same road which begins from end of another MDR with chainage from KM 10/0
MDR644	OSM	Natham - Pillaiyarnatham Road	Dindigul	32.80	KM 0/0 to KM 8/6 is converted into NH.
MDR645	OSM	Nochilli Road	Tiruvallur	12.80	
MDR646		Omalur Main Road		2.40	Upgraded as SH218
MDR647	OSM	Padamathur - Thiruppachethi Road	Sivagangai	10.00	
MDR648	OSM	Palaviduthi - Kadavur - Ayyalur Road	Karur, Palani	24.854	
MDR649	OSM	Palayam - Uppukottai Road	Theni	0.80	KM 0/8 to KM 19/2 upgraded as SH229
MDR650	OSM	Pallapatti - Aravakurichy - Esanatham - Gujiliamparai Road	Karur, Palani	29.128	
MDR651	OSM	Pallur - Sogandy Road	Chengalpattu	23.80	
MDR652	OSM	Paramakudi - Keerandai Road	Ramanathapuram	34.46	
MDR653	OSM	Pattukottai - Peravurani - Aranthangi Road	Thanjavur, Pudukkottai	44.20	
MDR654	OSM	Pennagaram - Nagamarai Road	Dharmapuri	29.60	
MDR655	OSM	Pension Line Road	Salem	0.93	
MDR656		Periyakulam - Devedhanapatti Road		8.60	Merged with MDR903
MDR657	OSM	Perundalaiyur - Kavandapady - Getticheiyur Road	Gopichettipalayam, Erode	29.80	
MDR658	OSM	Pettavaithalai - Nangavaram - Kavalkaranpatty Road	Karur	26.40	
MDR659		Polur - Jamunamarathur - Alangayam - Vaniyambadi Road		81.80	Upgraded as SH215
MDR660		Hill Round Road		5.20	Upgraded as SH231
MDR662	OSM	Puduchathiram - Portonovo Road	Cuddalore	6.55	KM 26/6 to KM 33/15
MDR663	OSM	Pudukkottai - Arimalam - Embal Road	Pudukkottai	46.00	
MDR664	OSM	Pudukkottai - Killukkottai - Manayeripatti Road	Pudukkottai, Thanjavur	41.70	
MDR665	OSM	Pudukkottai - Manapparai Road	Pudukkottai	48.20	
MDR666		Pudupadi - Illuppai - Vadailluppai - Perumbakkam - Vishar - Kancheepuram Road		37.60	Upgraded as SH116A
MDR667	OSM	Andipatty - Pullimancombai Road	Theni	15.00	MDR till KM 15/0 from Dindigul district border it is ODR
MDR668	OSM	Punnam - Pugalur Road	Karur	8.60	
MDR669	OSM	Puthiragoundampalayam - Panmadal - Edapatty Road	Salem	14.60	
MDR670	OSM	Puthur - Pudupattinam - Palaiyar Road	Nagapattinam	19.20	
MDR672	OSM	Rishivandhiyam - Eraiyur - Nemili Road	Kallakurichi	27.85	
MDR673	OSM	KM 2/10 of Arisipalayam to Cherring Cross Road - Chinneri Vayakadu Road	Salem	0.30	
MDR674		Salem Steel Plant Road		11.50	Upgraded as SH219
MDR675	OSM	Salem - Veeranam Road	Salem	9.60	KM 0/8 to KM 10/4
MDR676	OSM	Sangarapuram - Chinnamanur Road	Theni	11.20	
MDR677		Sankari - Edappady Road		13.20	Upgraded as SH220
MDR678	OSM	Saravanampatty - Thennampalayam Road	Coimbatore	17.20	
MDR679	OSM	Sathy - Periyakodivery - Kadambur Road	Gopichettipalayam	29.10	
MDR680	OSM	Sattanathapuram - Thiruvenkadu - Melaiyur Road	Nagapattinam	12.80	
MDR681	OSM	Sattur - Elayirampannai - Guhanparai Road	Virudhunagar	22.211	
MDR682	OSM	Sattur - Nenmeni - Nagalapuram Road	Virudhunagar	13.25	MDR till KM 13/25 at Tuticorin District border ODR terminates
MDR683	OSM	Sattur - Thiruvenkatapuram Road	Virudhunagar	31.55	at KM 31/55 another ODR terminates
MDR684	OSM	Sendurai - Udayarpalayam - Anaikarai Road	Ariyalur	38.80	
MDR685	OSM	Sengathalai Bridge - Vedaranyam Road	Nagapattinam	21.20	
MDR686	OSM	Singaperumalkoil - Reddikuppam Road	Chengalpattu	13.20	
MDR687	OSM	Sitharevu - Chinnalapatty Road	Dindigul	20.20	
MDR688	OSM	Sivagiri - Nathakadaiyur - Muthur Road	Tiruppur, Dharapuram	34.60	
MDR689	OSM	Sivakasi - Erichanatham Road	Virudhunagar	19.80	
MDR690	OSM	Solakadu - Semmedu - Vilaram - Semmedu Road	Namakkal	43.20	
MDR691	OSM	Soundirapuram - Anankur - Kannivadi Road	Karur, Dharapuram	20.00	
MDR692	OSM	South Car Street - Bus Stand Road	Virudhunagar	1.00	Approximate road chosen
MDR693	OSM	South Car Street	Virudhunagar	0.42	
MDR694	OSM	Sulthanbathery - Cherambadi Road	Udhagai	9.40	MDR from KM 11/0 to KM 20/4, continues from another MDR at Kerala state border
MDR695	OSM	Sundaraperumalkovil - Maruthanallur Road	Thanjavur	9.80	
MDR696	OSM	Suramangalam - Muthanaickenpatty - Omalur Road	Salem, Edappadi	13.80	
MDR697	OSM	Tenkasi - Tirumangalam Road to Keelarajakularaman	Virudhunagar	9.20	
MDR698	OSM	Tenkasi - Tirumangalam Road to Sholapuram	Virudhunagar	10.40	
MDR700	OSM	Thalaikundha - Kallatty - Theppakadu Road	Udhagai	29.20	

=== MDR 701 to MDR 800 ===
Road number	OSM relation	Name of road	Division	Length (in km)	Remarks
MDR701	OSM	Thalaivasal - Veeraganur Road	Salem	13.00	
MDR703	OSM	Thally - Jawalagiri Road	Krishnagiri	11.20	MDR till KM 11/2, at Karnataka state border other road joins
MDR705	OSM	Thanjavur - Karambakudi - Seethambalpuram Road	Thanjavur, Pudukkottai	56.60	
MDR706	OSM	Thanjavur - Periyakangeyanpatti Road	Thanjavur	26.60	
MDR707		Tharamangalam - Nangavalli - Kunchandiyur Road		19.60	Upgraded as SH223
MDR708	OSM	Tharangambadi - Manganallur - Aduthurai Road	Nagapattinam, Thanjavur	42.20	
MDR709	OSM	Thavasi - Vallam Road	Cheyyar	19.40	
MDR710	OSM	Thellar - Mazhayur Road	Cheyyar	15.20	
MDR711		Theni - Venkatachalapuram Road		10.70	Upgraded as SH227
MDR712	OSM	Theni Bypass Road	Theni	4.40	
MDR713	OSM	Thennampalayam - Vagarayampalayam - Annur Road	Coimbatore	20.00	
MDR714	OSM	Timiri - Kalavai Road	Vellore	14.20	
MDR715	OSM	Thiruppathur - Alangudi Road	Sivagangai	17.00	
MDR716	OSM	Tirupattur - Natrampalli Road	Vaniyambadi	14.80	
MDR717	OSM	Thiruppullani - Pirappanvalasai Road	Ramanathapuram	25.683	
MDR718	OSM	Thiruppuvanam - Pulvaikarai - Narikudi Road	Sivagangai, Virudhunagar	33.80	
MDR719	OSM	Tiruttani - Nagalapuram Road	Tiruvallur	14.565	Up to Andhra Pradesh border
MDR720	OSM	Thittai - Dharasuram Road	Thanjavur, Tiruvarur	31.00	
MDR721	OSM	Thummakkundu - Ulaipatti Road	Madurai	22.87	
MDR725	OSM	Town Railway Station Road	Salem	1.275	
MDR726	OSM	Tiruchengode - Komarapalayam Road	Namakkal	23.40	
MDR728	OSM	Vairamadai - Thoppampatty - Kuppam Road	Karur	24.33	
MDR729	OSM	Vaiyampatty - Konnaiyur Road	Trichy, Pudukkottai	48.50	
MDR730	OSM	Valathy - Avalurpet road	Villupuram	16.40	
MDR730A	OSM	Melmalayanur - Kodukkankuppam - Melsevalampady Road	Villupuram	9.60	
MDR732	OSM	Varatharajanagar - Renganathapuram Road	Theni	13.80	
MDR733	OSM	Vathalagundu - Thandigudi Road	Dindigul	40.90	
MDR734	OSM	Veerapandi - Nagalapuram Road	Theni	10.37	KM 4/83 to KM 15/2, KM 0/0 to KM 4/83 upgraded as SH229
MDR735	OSM	Veerapandi - Seeppalakottai Road	Theni	7.20	KM 0/0 to KM 7/2, KM 7/2 to KM 16/52 upgraded as SH227
MDR736	OSM	Veerapar - Gedilam Road	Kallakurichi	7.20	
MDR737	OSM	Velankanni - Vedaranyam Road	Nagapattinam	34.80	
MDR739		Vellemedupettai - Mailam Road		21.60	Upgraded as SH136
MDR740	OSM	Kannigaipair - Vengal - Seethancheri Road	Tiruvallur	26.80	
MDR741	OSM	Veppur - Tholar - Eraiyur Road	Cuddalore	21.60	
MDR742	OSM	Veriyappur - Markkampatty Road	Palani	23.10	MDR till 23/1, from Karur district border it is ODR
MDR743	OSM	Vilangadu Road	Cheyyar	15.20	MDR till KM 15/2, from Kanchipuram district border it is ODR
MDR744	OSM	Vilangudi - T.Palur - Annakaranpettai Road	Ariyalur	25.80	
MDR745	OSM	Viralimalai - Kalamavur Road	Pudukkottai	25.40	
MDR746	OSM	Vridhachalam - Palakollai Road	Cuddalore, Kallakurichi	21.60	
MDR748	OSM	Alankuppam - Avanipur - Konerikuppam Road	Villupuram	21.00	
MDR749	OSM	Andimadam - Srimushnam Road	Ariyalur	4.80	MDR till KM 4/8, from Cuddalure district border it is ODR
MDR751	OSM	Arni - Padavedu Road	Cheyyar, Tiruvannamalai	19.80	
MDR753	OSM	Kodavasal - Valangaiman - Papanasam Road	Tiruvarur	23.20	
MDR754	OSM	Kundarapalli - Veppanapalli Road	Krishnagiri	0.40	KM 16/0 to KM 16/4, KM 0/0 to KM 16/0 upgraded as SH226
MDR762	OSM	Andipandal - Nannilam Road	Tiruvarur	5.80	
MDR763	OSM	Andipatty - Jeyamangalam Road	Theni	6.60	MDR till KM 6/6, from there it is SH
MDR764		Avinashi - Puliyampatty Road		21.50	Upgraded as SH166
MDR765	OSM	Bhavani - Chellampalayam Road	Erode	0.20	
MDR766	OSM	Chinnadharapuram - Aravakurichi Road	Dharapuram, Karur	11.49	
MDR767		Edappady - Jalagandapuram - Mecheri Road		31.41	Upgraded as SH220
MDR768		Kallikudi - Thiruchuli - Kamuthi - Kariyapatti Road		73.30	KM 15/0 to KM 88/3, upgraded as SH154
MDR769	OSM	T.Kallupatti - Saptur Road	Madurai	9.20	MDR from KM 7/4 to 16/6, till KM 7/4 it is SH, from 16/6 it is ODR
MDR770		Kancheepuram - Thiruvathipuram Road		17.20	KM 13/0 to KM 30/2, upgraded as SH5A
MDR772	OSM	Karur - Vangal Road	Karur	11.40	
MDR773	OSM	Kottur - Meenamanallur - Senganthi Road	Tiruvarur	14.20	
MDR777	OSM	Mookanur - Harur Road	Dharmapuri	25.60	
MDR778	OSM	Pappanadu - Madhukkur - Perugavalanthan Road	Thanjavur, Tiruvarur	26.45	
MDR779	OSM	Thamaraikulam Road	Nagercoil	6.00	
MDR781	OSM	Tiruvallur - Karasangal Road	Chengalpattu	3.60	KM 31/4 - KM 35/0
MDR782	OSM	Thoghur - Ayyampettai Road	Thanjavur	42.20	
MDR783	OSM	Tiruchendur - Kanyakumari Road	Tuticorin, Tirunelveli	5.40	KM 11/4 to KM 15/0 and KM 102/65 to KM 104/45
MDR784	OSM	Thirukovilur - Thiyagadurgam Road	Kallakurichi	17.40	SH till KM 14/2, MDR from KM 14/2 to KM 31/6
MDR786	OSM	Pennalurpet Road	Tiruvallur	8.00	
MDR787	OSM	Goonipalayam - Placepalayam Road	Tiruvallur	12.80	
MDR788	OSM	Athimanjeri – Podaturpet – Nagari R.S. Road	Tiruvallur	14.20	Up to Andhra Pradesh border
MDR789	OSM	Thirumukkudal - Nelvoy - Thirukazhukundram Road	Chengalpattu	48.00	
MDR790	OSM	Perungalathur - Kolapakkam Road	Chengalpattu	5.20	
MDR791	OSM	Kancheepuram - Rajakulam Road	Chengalpattu	9.18	
MDR792	OSM	Kilveethi - Minnal - Ameerpet Road	Vellore	25.00	
MDR793	OSM	Panapakkam - Ganapathipuram - Thakkolam Road	Vellore	22.20	
MDR794	OSM	Ayal - Anvarthikanpet Road	Vellore	11.80	
MDR795	OSM	Muppaduvetti - Kaniyanur Road	Vellore	11.60	
MDR797	OSM	BHEL Feeder Road	Vellore	4.40	
MDR798	OSM	Delhigate Road	Vellore	2.80	
MDR799	OSM	Kelly's Road	Vellore	1.80	
MDR800	OSM	Ammapalayam - Pudupalayam Road	Tiruvannamalai	11.20	

=== MDR 801 to MDR 900 ===
Road number	OSM relation	Name of road	Division	Length (in km)	Remarks
MDR801	OSM	Vadamathimangalam - Kommanandal Road	Tiruvannamalai	17.00	
MDR802	OSM	Kalavai - Vazhapandal Road	Cheyyar	4.80	Extension to SH123 (KM 20/0 to KM 4/8)
MDR803	OSM	Verayur - Thandarai Road	Tiruvannamalai	9.80	
MDR804	OSM	Kozhapalur - Avaniyapuram Road	Cheyyar	9.90	
MDR805	OSM	Radhapuram - Vanapuram Road	Tiruvannamalai	7.80	
MDR806	OSM	Kalasapakkam - Melarni Road	Tiruvannamalai	6.80	
MDR807	OSM	Soorapattu - Anandapuram - Athiyur - Ottampattu Road	Villupuram	25.30	
MDR808	OSM	Perumpakkam - Tiruvakkarai - Kodukkur Road	Villupuram	9.94	
MDR809	OSM	Vellimalai - Moolakadu - Pudhur Road	Kallakurichi	62.80	
MDR810	OSM	Kachirapalayam - Vellimalai Road	Kallakurichi	32.20	
MDR811	OSM	Thiyagadurgam - Adari Road	Kallakurichi, Cuddalore	24.20	
MDR812	OSM	Thirukovilur - Vettavalam Road	Kallakurichi, Tiruvannamalai	15.60	
MDR813	OSM	Chinnayampettai - Elayankanni Road	Tiruvannamalai, Kallakurichi	20.40	
MDR814	OSM	Thittagudy - Avatti - Sirupakkam Road	Cuddalore	31.60	
MDR815	OSM	Vridhachalam - Kattugudalore Road	Cuddalore	19.60	
MDR816	OSM	Bhuvanagiri - Kurinjipady Road	Cuddalore	18.00	
MDR817	OSM	Kumaragudy - Nachiyarpettai Road	Cuddalore	10.00	
MDR818	OSM	Alathur - Ariyalur Road	Perambalur	29.80	
MDR819	OSM	Krishnapuram - Poolambadi - Veeraganur Road	Perambalur, Salem	21.80	
MDR820	OSM	Veppanthattai - Neikuppai - GST Road	Perambalur	20.80	
MDR821	OSM	Cavery South Bank Road	Trichy	8.525	
MDR822	OSM	Cauvery Left Bank Road	Trichy	14.10	
MDR823	OSM	Samayapuram - Thirupanjili - Keelakannukulam Road	Trichy	18.60	
MDR824	OSM	Thiruverambur - Suriyur Road	Trichy	15.40	
MDR825	OSM	Keeranur - Adhanakottai Road	Pudukkottai	24.20	
MDR826	OSM	Illuppur - Mathur Road	Pudukkottai	29.20	
MDR827	OSM	Perumanadu - Konnaiyur Road	Pudukkottai	20.70	
MDR827A	OSM	Arasamalai - Palakurichi Road	Pudukkottai	16.40	MDR till KM 16/4, from Trichy district border it is ODR
MDR828	OSM	Thiruchitrambalam - Andikkadu Road	Thanjavur	14.277	
MDR829	OSM	Thiruchitrambalam - Mavadukuruchi Road	Thanjavur	8.80	
MDR830	OSM	Kathiramangalam - Pandanallur Road	Thanjavur	8.20	
MDR831	OSM	Thiruvidaimarudur - Thirunageswaram - Thirunaraiyur Road	Thanjavur	9.20	
MDR832	OSM	Maruthanallur - Annal Agraharam Road	Thanjavur	5.20	
MDR833	OSM	Kunnandarkoil - Sengipatti Road	Pudukkottai, Thanjavur	18.20	
MDR834	OSM	Orathanadu - Neyvasal Road	Thanjavur	10.00	
MDR835	OSM	Sembodai - Chettipulam - Kariyapattinam Road	Nagapattinam	13.00	
MDR836	OSM	Anaikkaranchatram - Mahendrapalli Road	Nagapattinam	11.48	
MDR837	OSM	Kuravapulam - Karuppampulam - Kadinelvayal Road	Nagapattinam	8.90	
MDR838	OSM	Moolakkarai - Piranthiyankarai - Kariyapattinam Road	Nagapattinam	7.00	
MDR839	OSM	Koothanallur - Vedapuram - Thiruthuraipoondi Road	Tiruvarur	32.90	
MDR840	OSM	Mannargudi - Thirumakkottai - Chockanavoor Road	Tiruvarur	20.60	
MDR841	OSM	Kattokottai - Sadasivapuram - Thidavour Road	Salem	14.00	
MDR842	OSM	Hasthampatti - Kannankurichi Road	Salem	5.40	
MDR843	OSM	Konganapuram - Vaikundam - Kalipatty Road	Edappadi, Namakkal	17.00	
MDR844	OSM	Pudupalayam - Ponnarampatty Road	Salem, Namakkal	9.60	
MDR845	OSM	Kuppanur - Kottachedu - Valavanthi Road	Salem	18.60	
MDR846	OSM	Manjini - Gangavalli Road	Salem	5.80	
MDR847		Valappady - Belur Road		6.40	Upgraded as SH232
MDR848	OSM	Thalaivasal - Govindampalayam Road	Salem	11.92	
MDR849	OSM	Jalagandapuram - Chinnappampatty Road	Edappadi	10.80	
MDR850	OSM	Nalikkalpatty - Uthamasolapuram Road	Salem	5.93	
MDR851	OSM	Theevattipatty - Danispet - Boomidi Road	Edappadi	26.45	MDR till KM 26/45, from Dharmapuri district border it is ODR
MDR852	OSM	Malayalapatty - Ulipuram -Thammampatty Road	Namakkal, Salem	9.90	
MDR853	OSM	Mettala - Mullukurichi - Periyakombai Road	Namakkal	16.30	
MDR854	OSM	Chittalandur - Jedarpalayam Road	Namakkal	10.00	
MDR855	OSM	Namagiripettai - Ariyagoundampatti - Kallakuruchi Pirivu Road	Namakkal	7.585	
MDR856	OSM	Rasipuram - Pudupatti -Namagiripettai Road	Namakkal	14.80	KM 1/6 to KM 16/2
MDR857	OSM	Vaiyappamalai - Velagoundampatti Road	Namakkal	14.675	
MDR858	OSM	Mallasamuthiram - Vaiyappamalai Road	Namakkal	12.275	
MDR859	OSM	Pennagaram - Mudugampatti - Malaiyanur Road	Dharmapuri	24.04	
MDR860	OSM	Bommidi R.S. - Thoppaiyar Road	Dharmapuri	24.20	
MDR861	OSM	Kaveripattinam - Palacode Road	Krishnagiri, Dharmapuri	19.40	
MDR862	OSM	Kaveripattinam - Pochampalli Road	Krishnagiri	19.20	
MDR863	OSM	Jandamedu - Puliyur Road	Krishnagiri	20.20	
MDR864	OSM	Arasu Colony - Panjamadevi - Nerur Road	Karur	8.05	
MDR865	OSM	Uppidamangalam - Munayanur Road	Karur	9.417	
MDR866	OSM	Nangavaram - Perugamani Road	Karur	2.60	
MDR867	OSM	Manmangalam - Vangal Road	Karur	5.80	
MDR868	OSM	Irumboothipatty - Panjapatty Road	Karur	11.80	
MDR869	OSM	Tiruppur - Vanjipalayam - Thekkalur Road	Tiruppur	12.43	KM 0/0 to KM 4/93 and KM 5/8 to KM 13/3
MDR871	OSM	Karaipudur Pirivu - Valaithotathu Ayyan Koil Road	Tiruppur	6.40	
MDR872	OSM	Ganapathy - Athipalayam Road	Coimbatore	9.00	KM 0/8 to KM 9/8
MDR873	OSM	Sivanandha Mills - Vilankuruchi Road	Coimbatore	2.00	Begins from an unclassified road
MDR875	OSM	Veerapandi - Ugayanur Road	Tiruppur	8.00	
MDR876	OSM	Irrutupallam - Poondi Road	Coimbatore	8.00	
MDR877	OSM	Thudiyalur - Saravanampatty Road	Coimbatore	8.20	
MDR878	OSM	Anupparpalayam - Kaniyampoondi - Vanjipalayam Road	Tiruppur	7.45	KM 0/0 to KM 0/85 and KM 1/1 to KM 7/7
MDR879	OSM	Chinniyampalayam - Ravathur - Somanur Road	Coimbatore	19.40	
MDR881	OSM	Senjeri Hills - Mettulakshminaickenpalayam - Vadachittor Road	Pollachi	17.40	
MDR882	OSM	Palladam - Boomalur Road	Tiruppur	12.60	
MDR883	OSM	Pongalur - Genganaickenpalayam - Mettukadai Road	Tiruppur, Dharapuram	13.10	
MDR884	OSM	Dharapuram - Poolavdai Road	Dharapuram	27.66	
MDR885	OSM	Pasur R.S. - Elumathur - Vellodu Road	Erode	27.10	
MDR886	OSM	Nathakkadaiyur - Uthamapalayam Road	Tiruppur, Dharapuram	24.80	KM 0/0 to KM 7/4 and KM 7/8 to KM 25/2
MDR887	OSM	Uthur - Anankur Road	Dharapuram	7.20	
MDR888	OSM	Sathy - Ukkaram - Puliyampatty Road	Gopichettipalayam	20.00	
MDR888A	OSM	Puliyampatty - Nambiyur Road	Gopichettipalayam	18.20	
MDR889	OSM	Puliyampatty - Bhavanisagar - Bannari Road	Gopichettipalayam	27.00	KM 0/0 to KM 15/0 and KM 18/0 to KM 30/0, rest is under Bhavanisagar area
MDR890	OSM	Sathy - Kothamangalam Road	Gopichettipalayam	11.20	
MDR891	OSM	Perundurai - Kavandapady Road	Erode, Gopichettipalayam	17.40	
MDR892	OSM	Melur - Samuthirapatti - Kottaiyur - Aravakurichi Road	Madurai, Dindigul	42.60	
MDR893	OSM	Kadachanendal - Thiruvathavour Road	Madurai	17.80	
MDR894		Samayanallur - Melakkal Road		5.59	Upgraded as SH73A
MDR895	OSM	Koodakoil Road	Madurai	13.40	
MDR896	OSM	Mulanur - Kilangundal - Moolakadai - Chinniyagoundanvalasu Road	Dharapuram, Palani	27.39	
MDR897	OSM	Kodai - Pallangi Road	Dindigul	9.40	
MDR898	OSM	Kuttupatti - Seithur - Sendurai Road	Dindigul	14.80	KM 0/0 to KM 1/8 is converted into NH
MDR899	OSM	Thuvarankurichy - Kosukurichy Road	Trichy, Dindigul	13.00	KM 0/0 to KM 5/2 upgraded as NH785, road terminates at KM 9/0 and chainage begins as KM 9/0 from road splitting at KM 8/6.
MDR900	OSM	Palaya Ayakudi - Porulur Road	Palani	19.10	

=== MDR 901 to MDR 1000 ===
Road number	OSM relation	Name of road	Division	Length (in km)	Remarks
MDR901	OSM	Palani - Kolumam Road	Palani	13.20	MDR till KM 13/2, at KM 13/2 another MDR terminates
MDR902	OSM	Vathalagundu - Genguvarpatti Road	Dindigul	10.00	
MDR903	OSM	Periyakulam - Jeyamangalam - Eluvanampatti - Palaya Vathalagundu Road	Theni, Dindigul	31.23	MDR till 31/23 from there residential road
MDR904	OSM	Pithalaipatti - Palayakannivadi Road	Dindigul	10.20	
MDR905	OSM	Reddiarchatram - Kannivadi Road	Dindigul	7.60	
MDR906	OSM	Pettai Mettupatti - Nagal Nagar Road	Dindigul	2.23	
MDR907	OSM	Reddiarchatram - Karuppimadam Road	Palani	6.00	
MDR908	OSM	Kallimandayam - Kothampoondi - Mulanur Road	Palani	15.20	MDR till 15/2, from Tiruppur district road another MDR continues
MDR909	OSM	Kedaiyerambu - Edaiyakottai Road	Palani	9.40	
MDR910	OSM	Velampatti - Koothampoondi Road	Palani	19.20	
MDR911	OSM	Puliyampatty - Salakkadai Road	Palani	19.40	MDR till KM 19/4, from Tiruppur district border it is unclassified road
MDR912	OSM	Nattarasankottai - Panangudi - Chokkanathapuram Road	Sivagangai	23.30	
MDR913	OSM	Singampunari - V. Pudur Road	Sivagangai	19.20	
MDR914	OSM	Pulithipatti - Ponnamaravathy Road	Sivagangai, Pudukkottai	23.20	
MDR915	OSM	Ettivayal - Uthiragosamangai - Edambadal Road	Ramanathapuram	17.20	
MDR915A	OSM	Uthiragosamangai - Thiruppullani Road	Ramanathapuram	11.08	KM 0/0 to KM 10/88 and KM 11/21 to KM 11/41, in between there is MDR915B.
MDR915B	OSM	Thiruppullani - Sethukarai Road	Ramanathapuram	5.20	
MDR916	OSM	Thiruvadanai - S.P Pattinam Road	Ramanathapuram	23.98	
MDR917	OSM	Devakottai - Vattanam Road	Sivagangai, Ramanathapuram	30.89	
MDR918	OSM	Ramayanpatti Road	Tirunelveli	1.80	
MDR919	OSM	Thaneerkulam Branch Road	Tirunelveli	1.40	
MDR920	OSM	Veeragavapuram - Melanatham Road	Tirunelveli	4.73	
MDR921	OSM	Gopalasamudram Road	Tirunelveli	3.80	
MDR922		Kadayam - Mukkudal Road		28.00	Upgraded as SH40A
MDR923	OSM	Ayikudi - Tenkasi Road	Tenkasi	5.40	
MDR924	OSM	Vadakarai - Adavinainar Dam Road	Tenkasi	6.80	
MDR925	OSM	Alangulam - Kuruvikulam - Thiruvenkadam Road	Tenkasi	13.00	
MDR926	OSM	Kariapatti - Narikudi Road	Virudhunagar	24.20	
MDR927	OSM	Vellamadam - Suchindaram Road	Nagercoil	7.30	
MDR928	OSM	Parassalai - Kollencode Road	Nagercoil	7.60	begins at Kerala state border
MDR929	OSM	Swamiyarmadam -Meycode Road	Nagercoil	6.90	
MDR930	OSM	Nagercoil Beach Road	Nagercoil	8.50	
MDR931	OSM	Vattakottai - Kottaram - Agasteeswaram Road	Nagercoil	8.50	
MDR932	OSM	Mulagumoodu - Colachel Road	Nagercoil	11.20	
MDR933	OSM	Thiruvattar - Thirparappu Road	Nagercoil	7.90	
MDR934	OSM	Kadayam - Pavoorchatram Road	Tirunelveli, Tenkasi	13.40	
MDR935	OSM	Sillanatham - Puthiyamputhur Road	Tuticorin	11.00	
MDR936	OSM	Arumuganeri - Veerapandiapattinam Road	Tuticorin	6.20	
MDR937	OSM	Melamadai - Palavanatham Road	Virudhunagar	23.60	at KM 23/6 an ODR terminates
MDR938	OSM	Thiruthangal - Sengamalanachiyarpuram Road	Virudhunagar	5.40	
MDR940	OSM	Vellamadam - Shenbagaramanputhoor Road	Nagercoil	5.10	
MDR941	OSM	Kuzhithurai - Alancholai - Arukani Road	Nagercoil	29.10	runs till Kerala state border
MDR942	OSM	Lekshmipuram - Mondaikadu Road	Nagercoil	2.80	
MDR943	OSM	Eraviputhoorkadai - Karungal Road	Nagercoil	7.60	
MDR944	OSM	Thanichiyam - Alanganallur - Vavidamaruthur Road	Madurai	19.40	
MDR945	OSM	Thirunagar - Palkalainagar Road	Madurai	11.60	
MDR946	OSM	Othakadai - B.Muthupatti Road	Madurai	10.80	
MDR947	OSM	Sellur - Kulamangalam Road	Madurai	8.00	KM 4/8 to KM 12/8
MDR948	OSM	Varichiyur - Sakkudi Road	Madurai	7.00	
MDR949	OSM	Alagarkoil - Natham Road	Madurai	4.40	
MDR950	OSM	Kottanathampatti - Kodukkampatti Road	Madurai	20.78	MDR between KM 0/0 to KM 14/18 and KM 14/38 to KM 20/9, from Sivagangai district border it is ODR
MDR951	OSM	Peraiyur - Melapatti Road	Madurai	6.80	
MDR952	OSM	Vellaloor - Uranganapatti Road	Madurai	6.20	MDR till 6/2, from Sivagangai district border it is ODR
MDR953	OSM	Thirumangalam - Madurai Airport Road	Madurai	12.10	
MDR954	OSM	Chithalai - Vagaikulam - Munduvelampatti - Chellampatti Road	Madurai	19.20	Road till KM 14/0, then the chainage continues from KM 13/8 of the same road
MDR955	OSM	Kumaram - Sholavandan Road	Madurai	15.32	
MDR956	OSM	T.Kallupatti - Virudhunagar Road	Madurai, Virudhunagar	21.29	
MDR957	OSM	Kallandiri - Panaikulam Road	Madurai	13.40	
MDR958	OSM	Thirumal Road	Madurai	12.00	
MDR959	OSM	Thumbaipatti - Jeyankondanilai Road	Madurai	11.60	KM 0/0 to KM 8/8 and KM 9/26 to KM 12/06
MDR960	OSM	Avalsooranpatti - Sennampatti Road	Madurai	9.603	
MDR961	OSM	Padeeswaran - Pannikundu Road	Madurai	10.00	
MDR962	OSM	Peraiyur - Watrap Road	Madurai	9.19	
MDR963	OSM	Sengapadai - Sivarakkottai Road	Madurai	8.31	
MDR964	OSM	Bodi - Shanmugasundarapuram Road	Theni	1.15	
MDR965	OSM	Pannaipuram - Pulikuthi Road	Theni	6.60	
MDR966	OSM	Reddiarchatram - Devinaickenpatti - Kalvarpatty Road	Dindigul, Palani	28.10	
MDR967	OSM	Veiladichampatty - Palayakannivady Road	Dindigul	9.00	
MDR968	OSM	Veerkkal Road	Dindigul	5.20	
MDR969	OSM	Ambathurai - Sempatty Road	Dindigul	5.20	
MDR970	OSM	Ambilikkai - Kuthilippai Road	Palani	11.40	
MDR971	OSM	Chatirapatty - 19 Pudur - Devathur Road	Palani	9.57	
MDR972	OSM	Aralikottai - Keelavalavu Road	Sivagangai	13.40	
MDR973	OSM	Devakottai - Kannankudi - Pudukkottai District Border Road	Sivagangai	24.20	
MDR974	OSM	Karaikudi - Soorakudi Road	Sivagangai	4.40	
MDR975	OSM	Thayamangalam Road	Sivagangai	7.20	
MDR976	OSM	Mudukulathur - Sikkal Road	Ramanathapuram	20.073	
MDR977	OSM	Ganapathy - Nanjegoundanpudur - Kanuvai Road	Coimbatore	9.80	
MDR978	OSM	Thudiyalur - Chinnathadagam Road	Coimbatore	9.60	
MDR979	OSM	Karamadai - Sirumugai Road	Coimbatore	9.60	
MDR980		Chitra - Kurumbapalayam Road		8.61	Upgraded as SH233
MDR981	OSM	Kanthegoundanchavadi - Velanthavalum Road	Coimbatore	8.20	
MDR982	OSM	Kaundampalayam - Vadavalli - Onappalayam Road	Coimbatore	10.80	
MDR983	OSM	Kuppadampalayam - Ganapathypalayam - Singanur Road	Tiruppur	10.60	
MDR984	OSM	Thudiyalur - Maruthamalai Road	Coimbatore	10.20	
MDR985	OSM	KM 331/6 of Nagapattinam-Mysore Road - Pappampatty Road	Coimbatore	6.80	
MDR986	OSM	Singanallur - Peelamedu Road	Coimbatore	3.00	
MDR987	OSM	Ganapathy - Avarampalayam Road	Coimbatore	1.06	MDR till KM 1/06, then unclassified road continues
MDR988	OSM	Kinathukadavu - Cochin Frontier Road	Pollachi	14.10	MDR till KM 14/1, from Kerala state border it is unclassified road
MDR989	OSM	Akkaraipalayam - Kariyur Road	Dharapuram	13.60	
MDR990	OSM	Perundurai R.S. - Arachalur Road	Erode	13.00	
MDR991	OSM	Kallimandayam - Kothampoondi - Mulanur Road	Dharapuram	7.00	KM 15/2 to KM 22/2, at Dindigul district border another MDR joins
MDR992	OSM	Kangayam Bypass Road	Tiruppur	1.31	
MDR993	OSM	Uthiyur - Dasanaickenpatti Road	Tiruppur, Dharapuram	17.80	
MDR994	OSM	Doddabetta - Iduhatty - Kattabettu Road	Udhagai	21.80	
MDR995	OSM	Kotagiri - Kodanadu View Point Road	Udhagai	16.60	
MDR996	OSM	Alagapuram Road	Salem	2.60	
MDR997	OSM	Erode Privu Road - Sankari R.S. Road	Salem	3.20	
MDR998	OSM	Paramathy - Jedarpalayam Road	Namakkal	14.40	
MDR999	OSM	Mohanur - Oruvandur Road	Namakkal	7.60	MDR till KM 7/6, at Trichy district border ODR terminates
MDR1000		Veppanapalli - Theertham Road		12.40	Upgraded as SH226

=== MDR 1001 to MDR 1100 ===
Road number	OSM relation	Name of road	Division	Length (in km)	Remarks
MDR1001	OSM	Kurubarapalli - Kothakrishnapalli Road	Krishnagiri	17.40	
MDR1002	OSM	Ayyarmalai - Valayapatty - Kumaramangalam Road	Karur	13.40	
MDR1003	OSM	Velayuthampalayam - Pugalur R.S. Road	Karur	5.80	
MDR1004	OSM	Musiri Byepass Road	Trichy	2.85	
MDR1005	OSM	Arimalam - Thirumayam Road	Pudukkottai	17.80	
MDR1006	OSM	Alangudi - Maramadakki - Kurumbur Road	Pudukkottai	19.46	
MDR1007	OSM	Thirumayam - Panayapatti Road	Pudukkottai	12.00	
MDR1008	OSM	Poonthottam - Karaikkal Road	Tiruvarur, Nagapattinam	16.20	KM 0/0 to KM 14/0, KM 14/6 to KM 15/0, KM 16/0 to KM 17/8
MDR1010	OSM	Sakkottai - Annal Agharam Road	Thanjavur	2.80	
MDR1011	OSM	Velankanni Church Road	Nagapattinam	2.20	
MDR1011A	OSM	Akkaraipettai - Vadakkupoiyur - Velankanni Road	Nagapattinam	9.20	
MDR1012	OSM	Kuravapulam - Thopputhurai Road	Nagapattinam	7.36	
MDR1013	OSM	Chinnasalem - Kachirapalayam Road	Kallakurichi	12.40	
MDR1014	OSM	Thirukovilur - Manalurpet Road	Kallakurichi	11.00	
MDR1015	OSM	Pattampakkam - Maligaimedu - Rajapalayam Road	Cuddalore	7.63	
MDR1016	OSM	Beach Road	Cuddalore	4.30	
MDR1017	OSM	Kammiyampettai - Semmandalai - Gundusalai Road	Cuddalore	4.18	
MDR1018	OSM	Manali - Mathur Road	Tiruvallur	5.70	
MDR1019	OSM	Lakshmipuram - Puzhal Road	Tiruvallur	3.00	
MDR1020	OSM	Valasaravakkam - Valluvar Nagar - Ramapuram Road	Tiruvallur	3.00	
MDR1021	OSM	Maduravoyal - Valasaravakkam Road	Tiruvallur	2.90	
MDR1022	OSM	Basin Road	Tiruvallur	1.80	
MDR1024	OSM	Ponnerikarai - Paranthur Road	Chengalpattu	8.20	
MDR1025	OSM	Railway Road	Chengalpattu	1.46	
MDR1026	OSM	Kodambakkam to Sriperumbudur Road - Kolapakkam - Manapakkam Road	Chengalpattu	5.60	
MDR1027	OSM	Pudupakkam - Sirucheri Road	Chengalpattu	6.20	
MDR1028	OSM	Nelvoy - Pallikonda Road	Vellore	19.80	
MDR1029	OSM	Gandhi Nagar Main Road	Vellore	1.90	
MDR1030	OSM	Virinjipuram Road	Vellore, Vaniyambadi	6.00	
MDR1031	OSM	Srivilliputhur - Thiruvannamalai Road	Virudhunagar	3.00	
MDR1038		Tiruppur Ring Road		39.70	Upgraded as SHN2
MDR1039	OSM	Chidambaram - Pitchavaram Tourism Road	Cuddalore	9.80	KM 3/2 to KM 13/0, KM 0/0 to KM 3/2 upgraded as NH45A
MDR1040	OSM	Coimbatore - Thondamuthur - Narasipuram Road	Coimbatore	22.00	
MDR1041	OSM	Minjur – Kattur – Thirupalaivanam Road	Tiruvallur	17.20	
MDR1042	OSM	Km.11/8 of SCKAT Road - Vitalapuram - Pudupattinam Road	Chengalpattu	17.40	KM 0 - KM 17 and KM 18/4 - KM 18/8
MDR1043	OSM	Kilvelur - Katchanam Road	Nagapattinam	20.40	
MDR1044	OSM	Ayothiyapattinam - Belur - Kilakkadu Road	Salem	54.60	
MDR1045	OSM	Chellampalayam - Burgur - Kollegal Road	Erode	51.20	Begins at end of SH, MDR till 51/2, from Karnataka state border another road continues
MDR1047	OSM	Kovilpatti - Ottapidaram - Puducottai - Eral - Mukkani Road	Tuticorin	77.00	
MDR1048	OSM	Viswanatham - Venkatachalapuram Road	Virudhunagar	16.125	
MDR1049	OSM	Kanakammachattiram - Thakkolam Road	Tiruvallur	18.55	MDR till KM 18/55, from Vellore district border it is ODR
MDR1054	OSM	Mayiladuthurai - Muthupet Road	Tiruvarur	2.40	KM 91/8 to KM 94/2
MDR1055	OSM	Pattukkottai - Muthupet Road	Tiruvarur	1.10	KM 65/9 to KM 67/0
MDR1071	OSM	Udhagai - Avalanchi - Kundha - Thaishola Road	Udhagai	42.17	MDR till KM 42/17, then it is ODR
MDR1073	OSM	Coonoor - Kattabettu Road	Udhagai	13.80	
MDR1077	OSM	Udhagai - Kaikatty Road	Udhagai	15.40	
MDR1081	OSM	Wellington - Kotagiri Road	Udhagai	5.20	KM 3/0 to KM 8/2, till KM 3/0 under Wellington roads
MDR1093	OSM	Dharasuram - Mulayur Road	Thanjavur	1.20	
MDR1094	OSM	Alanganallur - Muduvarpatti - Chathiravellalapatti Road	Madurai	17.20	
MDR1095	OSM	Palamedu - Vembarali Road	Madurai	6.60	
MDR1096	OSM	KM 377/6 of BCC Road - KM1/6 of SH35 Link Road	Dindigul	1.16	
MDR1097	OSM	Manjoor - Keelakottai Road	Ramanathapuram	3.40	
MDR1098	OSM	Edaiyar Kudiyurppu Road	Ramanathapuram	0.40	
MDR1099	OSM	NH 49 Branch at KM 76/262 in Paramakudi Town Area	Ramanathapuram	0.153	
MDR1100	OSM	KM 18/10 of Palladam-Cochin Frontier Road - Kalangal - Kasigoundenpudur Road	Coimbatore	8.40	

=== MDR 1101 to MDR 1200 ===
Road number	OSM relation	Name of road	Division	Length (in km)	Remarks
MDR1101		Thondamuthur - Madampatty Road		3.20	Modified as MDR586
MDR1102	OSM	Vavipalayam - Uthukuli Road	Tiruppur	7.40	
MDR1103	OSM	Andipalayam - Attayampalayam Road	Tiruppur	5.49	
MDR1104	OSM	Muthur - Vellakovil - Mulanur Road	Dharapuram	0.60	KM 14/6 to KM 15/2, rest is SH
MDR1105		Kumbakonam - Sirkali Road (Link Road)		1.00	Road modified and Unidentified
MDR1106		Taramani Link Road		3.63	Upgraded as SH48B
MDR1107	OSM	Sathanur Dam Road	Tiruvannamalai	5.00	
MDR1108	OSM	Jaffrabath Road	Vellore	6.00	
MDR1109	OSM	Thumberi - Sankarapuram - Diguvapalayam Road	Vaniyambadi	10.20	
MDR1110	OSM	Madanur - Gudiyatham Road	Vaniyambadi	5.40	
MDR1111	OSM	Jolarpettai – Natrampalli Road	Vaniyambadi	9.60	
MDR1111A	OSM	Dhamalerimuthur Road	Vaniyambadi	8.80	
MDR1112	OSM	KM 4/2 of Tiruvannamalai-Arur Road - KM 12/2 of Thandrampet-Kottakulam Road	Tiruvannamalai	17.90	Kilsirupakkam - G.Krishnapuram Road
MDR1113	OSM	Vallam - GST Road	Villupuram	19.20	
MDR1114	OSM	Melpattampakkam - Madukarai - Panchamadevi Road	Cuddalore, Villupuram	15.80	MDR till KM 9/4 and between 12/3 and 18/5, ODR from KM 9/4 to KM 10/3 and then till 12/3 under Puducherry UT.
MDR1115	OSM	Moratandy - Bommiyampalayam Road	Villupuram	9.00	
MDR1116	OSM	Chidambaram - Thandavaransozhaganpettai Road	Cuddalore	13.80	
MDR1117	OSM	Nemam - Devangudy Road	Cuddalore	13.60	
MDR1118	OSM	Eraiyur - Kandappankurichi - Nallur Road	Cuddalore	24.50	
MDR1119	OSM	Pudupettai - Oraiyur - Karumbur - Paithampadi Road	Cuddalore	15.70	MDR till KM 15/7, from Cuddalore district border unclassified road
MDR1120	OSM	Alathur - Chettikulam - Senjeri Road	Perambalur	21.20	
MDR1120A	OSM	Chettikulam - Nakkaselam Road	Perambalur	7.20	
MDR1121	OSM	Sendurai - Anganur - Agaramseegur - Thirumandurai Road	Ariyalur, Perambalur	36.40	
MDR1122	OSM	Thirumanur - Ellakurichi - Thoothur Road	Ariyalur	21.49	
MDR1123	OSM	Eragudy - Alathudaiyanpatty - Puliyancholai Road	Trichy	14.46	
MDR1124	OSM	Kajamalai - Mullipatty Road	Trichy	10.00	
MDR1125	OSM	Siruthaiyur - Anbil - Sengaraiyur Road	Trichy	13.60	
MDR1126	OSM	Mandapam - Kumulur - Peruvalappur Road	Trichy	10.60	
MDR1127	OSM	Kamalapuram - Chinnathirupathi - Jodukuli Road	Edappadi	18.70	
MDR1128	OSM	Edappadi - Moolapathai - Panikanur Road	Edappadi	16.20	
MDR1129	OSM	Koneripatty - Kalvadangam Road	Edappadi	3.00	
MDR1129A	OSM	Kalvadangam - Poolampatty Road	Edappadi	7.00	
MDR1129B	OSM	Moolappathai - Kalvadangam Road	Edappadi	6.40	
MDR1130	OSM	Chittoor - Pakkanadu - Jalagandapuram Road	Edappadi	12.745	
MDR1131	OSM	Nedungulam Ferry Road	Edappadi	0.40	
MDR1132	OSM	Tiruchengode - Kokkarayanpettai Road	Namakkal	14.40	MDR till KM 14/4, from there ODR runs till Erode district border
MDR1133	OSM	Bargur - Jagadevi Road	Krishnagiri	8.20	
MDR1134	OSM	Krishnagiri - Maharajakadai - Kandhikuppam Road	Krishnagiri	22.60	KM 0/0 to KM 18/5 and KM 18/9 to KM 23/0.
MDR1135	OSM	Thally - Gummalapuram Road	Krishnagiri	9.60	MDR till KM 9/6, at Karnataka state border another road joins
MDR1136	OSM	Athimugam - Perandapalli - Thorapalli Road	Krishnagiri	23.20	
MDR1137	OSM	Perundurai - R.S. - Chennimalai Road	Erode	13.40	
MDR1138	OSM	Unjalur R.S. - Sivagiri - Vadapalani Road	Erode	22.00	
MDR1139	OSM	Kurumbapalayam - Karichipalayam Road	Coimbatore	12.80	
MDR1140	OSM	Pethikuttai - Pulliyampatti Road	Coimbatore	12.20	
MDR1141	OSM	Karuvalur - Kovilpalayam Road	Tiruppur, Coimbatore	20.80	
MDR1142	OSM	Ketty - Palada - Selas Road	Udhagai	10.40	
MDR1143	OSM	Sholurmattam Road	Udhagai	12.00	MDR till KM 12/0, from there another ODR begins
MDR1144	OSM	Sitharpatty Vilakku - Ganeshapuram - Ambasamuthiram Road	Theni	11.60	
MDR1145	OSM	Kanniyappapillaipatty - G.Usilampatty - Gandamanur Road	Theni	13.60	
MDR1146	OSM	Periyakulam - Sothuparai Road	Theni	9.68	MDR till KM 9/68, from Dindigul district border it is unclassified
MDR1147	OSM	Myladumparai - Vaikkalparai - Thangammalpuram Road	Theni	14.40	
MDR1148	OSM	Parali - Lingavadi - Ponthuugampatti Road	Dindigul, Madurai	7.40	
MDR1149	OSM	Dindigul - Sirumalai Ghat Road	Dindigul	22.00	MDR till KM 22/0, from there it is unclassified
MDR1150	OSM	Palani - Balasamuthiram - Palaru Dam Road	Palani	7.20	MDR from KM 0/0 to KM 7/2, at KM 0/0 residential road terminates, from KM 7/2 it is unclassified road
MDR1151	OSM	Devakottai - Muppaiyur Road	Sivagangai	14.80	Begins from MDR413
MDR1152	OSM	Devakottai - A.Pudur Road	Sivagangai	12.10	
MDR1153	OSM	Manamadurai - Puliyangulam Road	Sivagangai	11.20	
MDR1154	OSM	Veneervaikkal - Manjoor Road	Ramanathapuram	20.80	
MDR1155	OSM	Valudur - Periyapattinam Road	Ramanathapuram	10.20	
MDR1156	OSM	Keelakidaram - Valinockam Road	Ramanathapuram	7.80	
MDR1157	OSM	Alwarkurichi - Karuthapillaiyur Road	Tirunelveli	9.40	
MDR1158	OSM	Ambur - Papanasam Road	Tirunelveli	6.60	
MDR1159	OSM	Thailapuram - Meignanapuram - Kayamozhi - Gandhipuram Road	Tuticorin	23.40	
MDR1160	OSM	Nazareth - Eral Road	Tuticorin	16.80	
MDR1161	OSM	Derisanamcode - Surulacode Road	Nagercoil	10.90	
MDR1162	OSM	Kadayal - Pechipparai Road	Nagercoil	7.40	
MDR1163	OSM	Pallavaram - Thiruneermalai - Thirumudivakkam Road	Chennai City Roads, Chengalpattu	8.40	
MDR1163	OSM	Old Batlakundu - Eluvanampatty Road	Theni	2.20	KM 13/0 to KM 15/2, begins from another MDR at KM 13/0
MDR1164	OSM	Tambaram - Somangalam Road	Chennai City Roads, Chengalpattu	9.60	
MDR1164	OSM	KM 6/8 of NH 210 to Annanagar Road	Trichy	4.70	
MDR1165	OSM	Chettipadu – Nemam Road	Tiruvallur	7.60	
MDR1166	OSM	Thiruverkadu - Ambattur Road	Tiruvallur	9.20	
MDR1167	OSM	Melpakkam – Kannampalayam Road	Tiruvallur	7.20	
MDR1167	OSM	Ilayangudi Bypass Road	Sivagangai	2.43	
MDR1168	OSM	Timiri - Kavanur Road	Vellore	6.20	
MDR1168	OSM	Periyakulam - Adukkam - Kodaikanal Road	Theni	10.80	MDR till 10/8, from Dindigul district border it is ODR
MDR1169	OSM	Perumanam Road	Tiruvannamalai	8.60	
MDR1170	OSM	Sathambady - Kaplampady Road	Villupuram	9.675	
MDR1171	OSM	Gingee - Vadapalai Road	Villupuram	12.80	
MDR1172	OSM	Karunkuzhi - Mettukuppam Road	Cuddalore	7.15	
MDR1173	OSM	Mallur - Veerapandy Road	Salem	9.725	
MDR1174	OSM	Tholasampatty Road	Edappadi	9.60	
MDR1174A	OSM	Tholasampatty - Mallappanur Road	Edappadi	15.80	
MDR1175	OSM	Karuppur - Vellapatty - Thathiyangarpatty Road	Edappadi	9.70	
MDR1176	OSM	Mudalaipatti - Kalinaickanur Road	Namakkal	11.30	
MDR1177	OSM	Puthuchathiram - Singalanthapuram Road	Namakkal	9.82	
MDR1178	OSM	Vadugapatty - Alanganatham Road	Namakkal	8.40	
MDR1179	OSM	Pudukkottai - Valayapatty Road	Namakkal	8.30	
MDR1180	OSM	Thanneerpandal - Kambaliyampatti - Lakkamanaickenpalayam Road	Tiruppur	12.60	MDR till 12/4, from Dharapuram division border it is ODR
MDR1181	OSM	Thavittupalayam - Appakoodal Road	Erode	11.80	
MDR1182	OSM	Kuruchi - Madukkarai - Nachipalayam - Kannamanaickenur Road	Coimbatore, Pollachi	18.40	
MDR1183	OSM	Samathur - Devanurpudur road	Pollachi	10.60	MDR till 10/6, from Tiruppur district border it is ODR
MDR1184	OSM	Arasur Market - Nambiyur Market Road	Gopichettipalayam	14.00	
MDR1185	OSM	Kottur - Kamatchipuram Road	Theni	8.40	
MDR1186	OSM	Veerapandi - Koduvilarpatty Road	Theni	6.60	
MDR1187	OSM	Ramanaickenpatti - Vadhuvarpatti Road	Virudhunagar	7.20	from KM 7/2 it is ODR
MDR1188	OSM	Tenkasi - Sundarapandiyapuram Road	Tenkasi	9.20	
MDR1189	OSM	Radhapuram - Irukkanthurai Road	Tirunelveli	12.20	
MDR1190	OSM	Monday Market - Mankuzhy - Manavalakurichi Road	Nagercoil	5.70	
MDR1191	OSM	Karungal - Colachel Road	Nagercoil	6.10	
MDR1192	OSM	Sannasipatty - Sethurapatty - Fathima Nagar Road	Trichy	9.60	
MDR1193	OSM	Veliyathur - Okkur Road	Pudukkottai	10.60	
MDR1194	OSM	Avudayarkovil - Okkur Road	Pudukkottai	8.11	
MDR1195	OSM	Avudayarkoil - Perumaruthur Road	Pudukkottai	8.00	ODR joins at KM 8/0
MDR1196	OSM	Ponnamaravathy - Thirukkalambur Road	Pudukkottai	12.70	MDR till KM 12/7, from Sivaganga district border it is ODR
MDR1197	OSM	Vallampudur - Nattani - Thatchankurichi Road	Pudukkottai	7.40	MDR till KM 7/4, from Thanjavur district border it is ODR
MDR1198	OSM	Karaiyur - Melathaniyam Road	Pudukkottai	7.10	
MDR1199	OSM	Alangudi - Thalainayar - Thalanthiruvasal Road	Nagapattinam	12.00	
MDR1200	OSM	SathanKulam - Thisayanvilai Road	Thoothukudi, Tirunelveli	13.00	
			Total	11639.301	

== See also ==
- Highways of Tamil Nadu
- Road network in Tamil Nadu
- National Highways
- List of national highways in India
- National Highways Authority of India
