= Avinashi =

Suburb of Tirupur, Tamil Nadu, India

Avinashi Thirupukkoliyur
- suburb
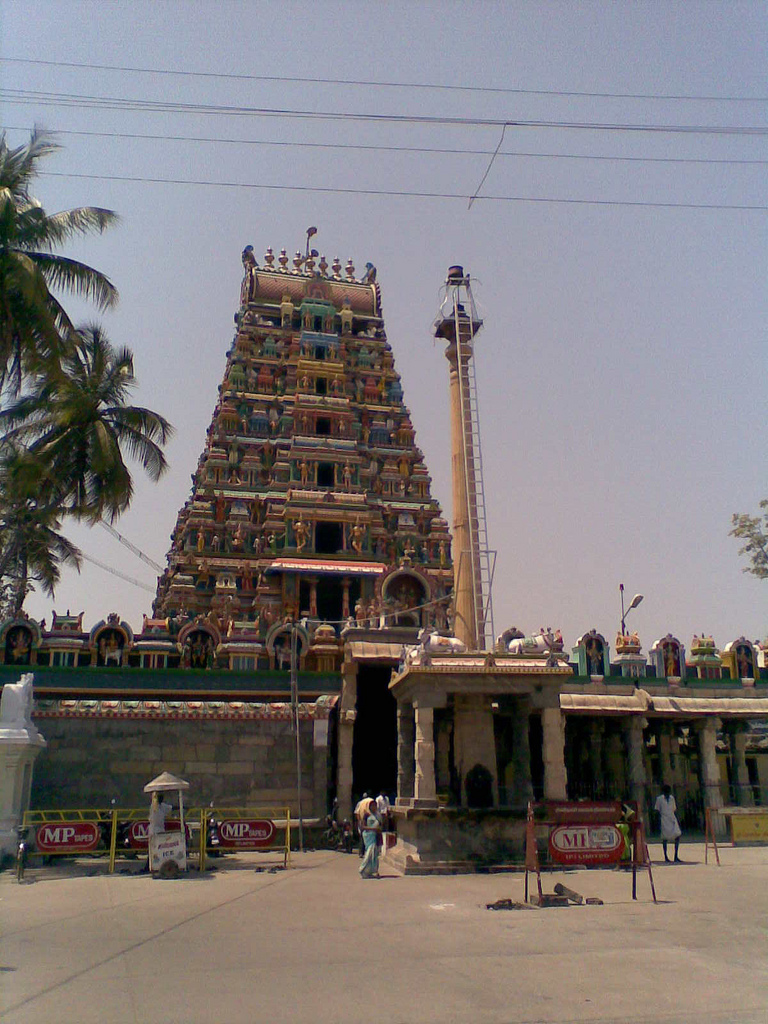
- The Avinasiappar Temple in Avinashi

- Avinashi (Tamil Nadu)
- Coordinates: 11°10′22.8″N 77°16′07.0″E
- Country: India
- State: Tamil Nadu
- Region: Kongu Nadu
- District: Tiruppur district
- Taluk: Avinashi
- Elevation: 356 m (1,168 ft)

Languages
  - Official: Tamil
- Time zone: UTC+5:30 (IST)
- PIN: 641654
- Telephone code: +91-4296
- Vehicle registration: TN-39-Z

Avinashi (previously known as Thirupukkoliyur) is a municipality in the Tiruppur district in the Indian state of Tamil Nadu. Avinashi is one among the nine taluks of the district. It is one of the most popular pilgrim destinations in the Western Tamil Nadu region. It is located off of National Highway NH544, which bypasses the town. The history of the town is centered around the Avinasilingeswarar temple. The town was previously a part of the Coimbatore(Kovai) district until Tirupur was carved out as a separate district from the erstwhile districts of Coimbatore and Erode. It is a stopping place for vehicles travelling from the western part of Tamil Nadu to Chennai and Cochin. Avinashi Taluk has one municipality and Block Panchayat by administration. Avinashi Block Panchayat has 19 wards along with 31 Village Panchayats.

== Etymology ==
The word Avinashi means "indestructible", referring to the God of the Avinashi Temple. It was previously known as Thirupukkoliyur . Thiru means "grace of God" and Pukkoliyur means "a place of refuge". It is said that once Devas took shelter in this temple in fear of Asuras.

"Vinasam" in Tamil means "Destruction". Prefixing with 'A' means 'No-destruction'. Avinashi is "a place which doesn't have any destruction by any means".

== History ==
Avinashi is part of the ancient Kongunadu region, which now comprises the districts of Tiruppur, Coimbatore, Erode, Nilgiris, Salem, Dharmapuri, Karur, Namakkal, Dindigul and Krishnagiri. This place was known as Thirupukkoliyur in the Sangam era. It is one of the seven Shivastalams in Kongu Nadu; however this temple is better known as Karunaiyaaththaal temple. Avinashi is also referred to in inscriptions as Dakshina Varanasi, Tiruppukkozhiyur etc. Tirumular's Tirumantiram, Arunagirinathar's Tiruppugazh and Manikkavasakar's Tiruvasakam refer to this shrine.

== Geography ==
Avinashi has an average elevation of 313 metres (1030 feet).

Avinashi is a suburb of Tiruppur located on the arterial road connecting the textile cities of Tirupur, Erode and Coimbatore. It is known for the Shiva temple constructed by Sundarapandiya and is closely associated with the Saiva saint Sundaramoorthy Nayanar.

== Demographics ==
As per the data recorded in the 2011 census, Avinashi Taluk registered a total population of 337,923, comprising 168,055 males and 169,868 females, resulting in a gender ratio of 1,011 females for every 1,000 males. The literacy rate in the taluk was documented at 68.05%. Additionally, the population of children under the age of 6 years was reported to be 15,424 males and 14,709 females.

== Transport ==
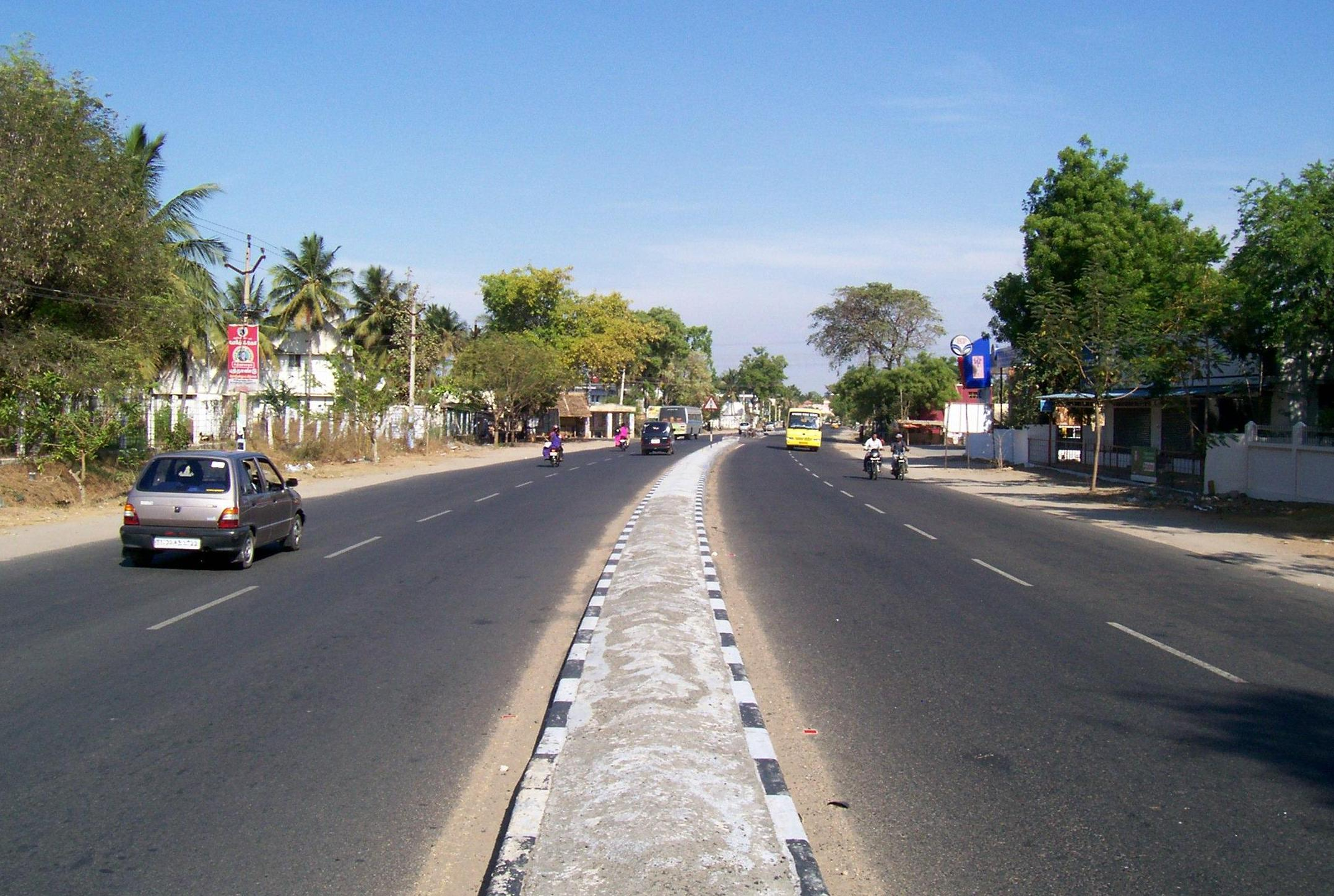
Avinashi-Tirupur-Palladam road

The nearest airport is the Coimbatore International Airport, which is about 32 km away from the town. There is no rail transport to the town. The nearest Railway Station is at Tirupur, which is about 12 km away from Avinashi. The key public mass transport for Avinashi is Buses run by the State Government & Private Sector that provide service to the people.

== Landmark ==
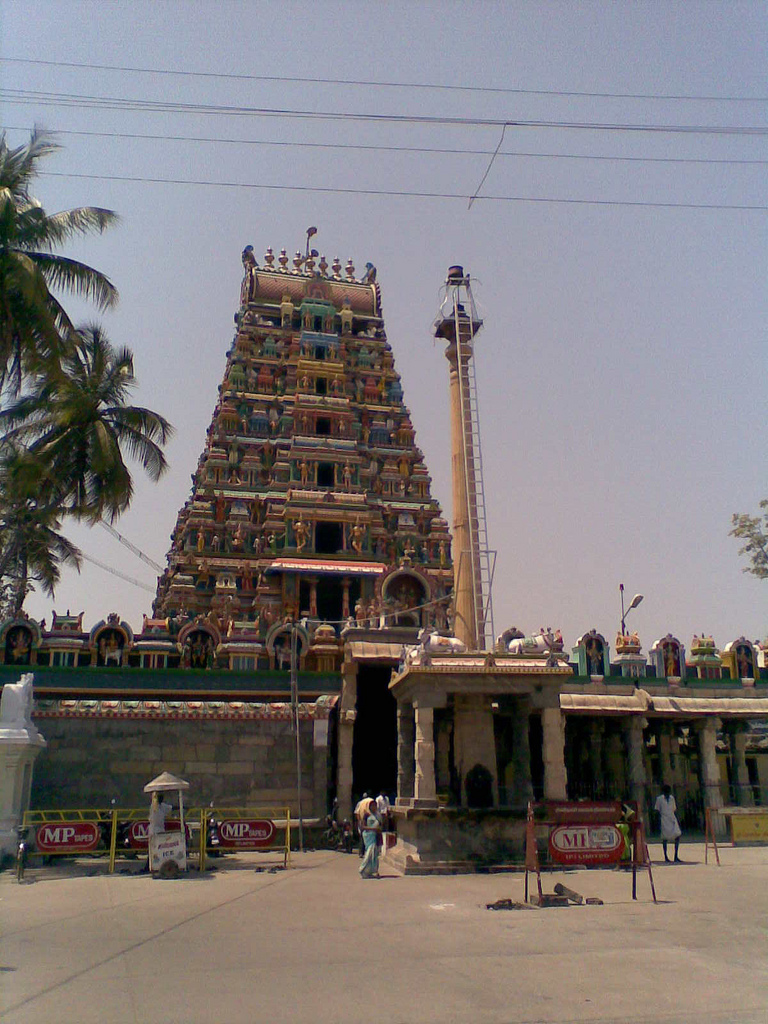
Shri Avinashilingeshwarar Temple, in Avinashi, in Tiruppur district, Tamil Nadu, India

Tiruppukkozhiyur (Avinashilingeshwarar) temple is a protected monument under the Archaeological survey of India.

== Industries ==
The town and its surrounding areas are notable for a significant concentration of textile mills, encompassing both spinning and weaving operations. These establishments are integral to the supply chain of various apparel manufacturers, with S.P. Apparels Ltd. being among the most prominent collaborators. Furthermore, the region is home to numerous engineering industries. Agriculture constitutes the primary livelihood for a considerable portion of the population residing in Avinashi Taluk, which encompasses 32 sub-villages. The economic landscape is diversified with over 19 villages reliant on the power loom, knitting industries, and spinning mills, while an additional 13 villages engage predominantly in agricultural and engineering activities. Notably, Palankarai, Thekkalur, and Sevur are distinguished by their higher population density and developmental progress.

== Notable people ==
Ayyasamy Dharun is an Indian track athlete who competes in the 400 meters and the 400 meters hurdles disciplines. He represented India in the 4 × 400 meters relay during the 2016 Summer Olympics. Dharun secured a silver medal in the 400m hurdles at the Asian Games in 2018.

P. Dhanapal is a member of the Legislative Assembly and has served as the Speaker of the 14th and 15 th Tamil Nadu Legislative Assembly.

== Festivals ==
This temple's car is the second biggest in India, after the one in Tiruvarur and is noted for its fine wooden carvings. Since the old car (chariot) was destroyed by fire in 1990s, it has been rebuilt. The annual Bhrammotsavam is celebrated in the month of Chittirai. Apart from Temple car festival, 'Arubathi moovar (63 Naayanmaars) Ula' is one of the notable festival in this temple. The festival chariot here is said to be on par with Tiruvarur. Previously it was a 10-day festival, but now it is celebrated for 2 days. There are two temple cars, the wheels of the cars are made of iron. In earlier days, the car was pulled by people alone, now bulldozers help to move the car. The traffic in the Avinashi road is increasing day by day, and because of this, the temple management is thinking of moving the car from the road side to some other place near the temple.

== See also ==
- Thandukkaran palayam
