= Pugalur =

Town in India

- Town
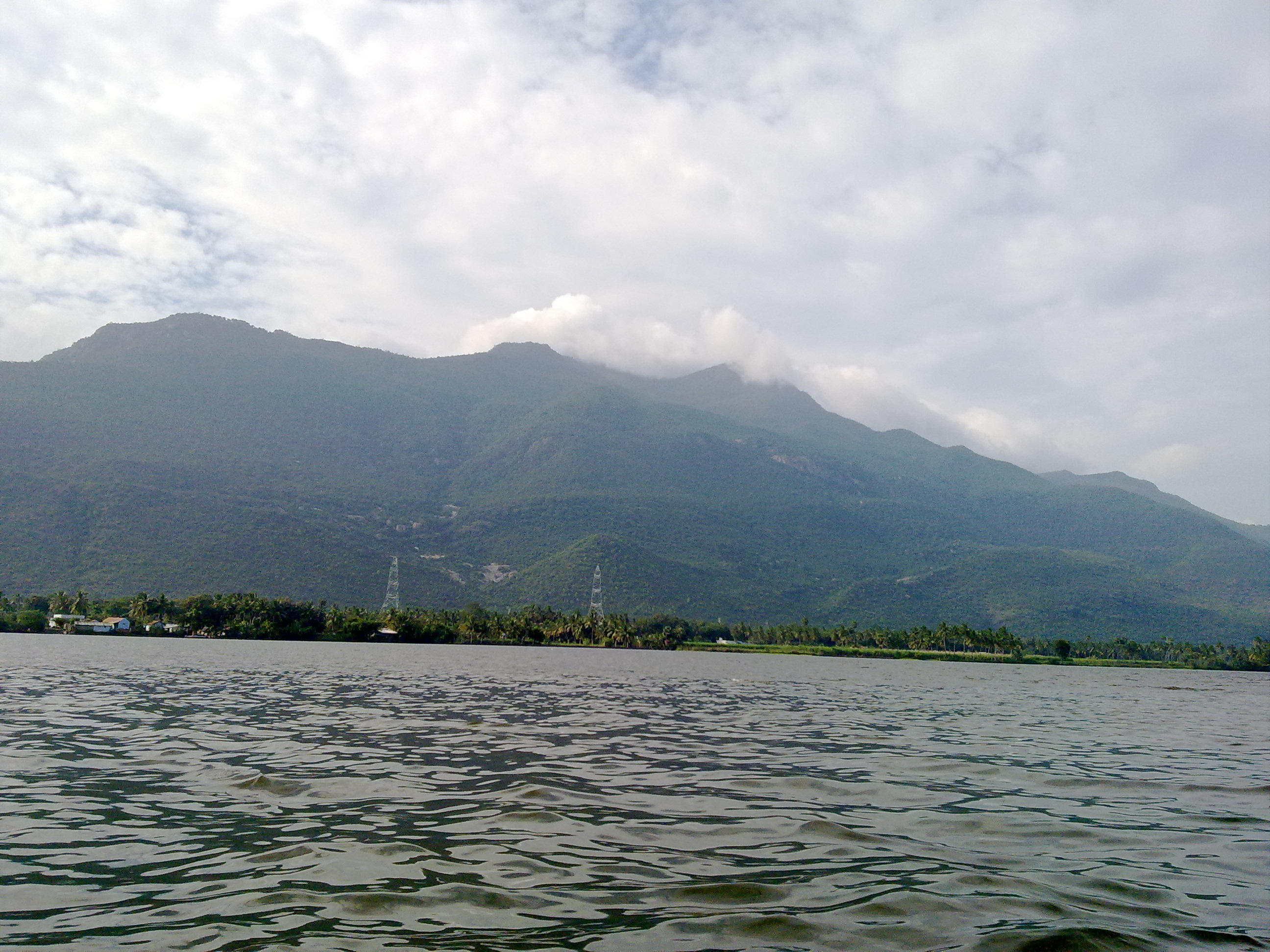

- Location in Tamil Nadu, India Pugalur (India)
- Coordinates: 11°05′N 78°01′E
- Country: India
- State: Tamil Nadu
- District: Karur

Government
  - Body: Municipality
  - Member of Parliament: Jothimani

Area
  - Total: 45 km^{2} (17 sq mi)

Population
  - Total: 50,897
  - Density: 1,100/km^{2} (2,900/sq mi)

Languages
  - Official: Tamil
- Time zone: UTC+5:30 (IST)
- PIN: 639117
- Area code: 04324
- Vehicle registration: TN 47

Pugalur is a town in Karur district in Tamil Nadu, India. It has two parts: Nanjai Pugalur and Punjai Pugalur. Nanjai refers to land with plenty of water, and Punjai refers to land with few bodies of water.

== Geography ==
Pugalur is on the bank of the perennial Kaveri River. It includes many villages and towns. Among these, TNPL Pugalur is the most famous. Other villages include Kattur, Kattipalayam, Kattur, Mettupalayam, Moolimangalam, MurugamPalayam, Punjai Thottakurichi, Punjaipugalur, Salapalayam, Sokkankadu, Sottaiyur, Thirukkattuthurai, and Velayuthampalayam.

=== Climate ===
The highest temperatures in Pugalur are in early May to early June, usually about 34 °C (93 °F) and exceeding 38 °C (100 °F) for a few days most years. The average daily temperature during January is around 23 °C (73 °F), although the temperature rarely falls below 17 °C (63 °F). The average annual rainfall is about 725 mm (28.5 in) in Nanjai and 310 mm (12 in) in Punjai. These areas get most of their seasonal rainfall from the northeast monsoon winds from late September to mid-November.

== Demographics ==
The population of Pugalur is around 40,000 in Punjai and 15,000 in Nanjai.

== Economy ==
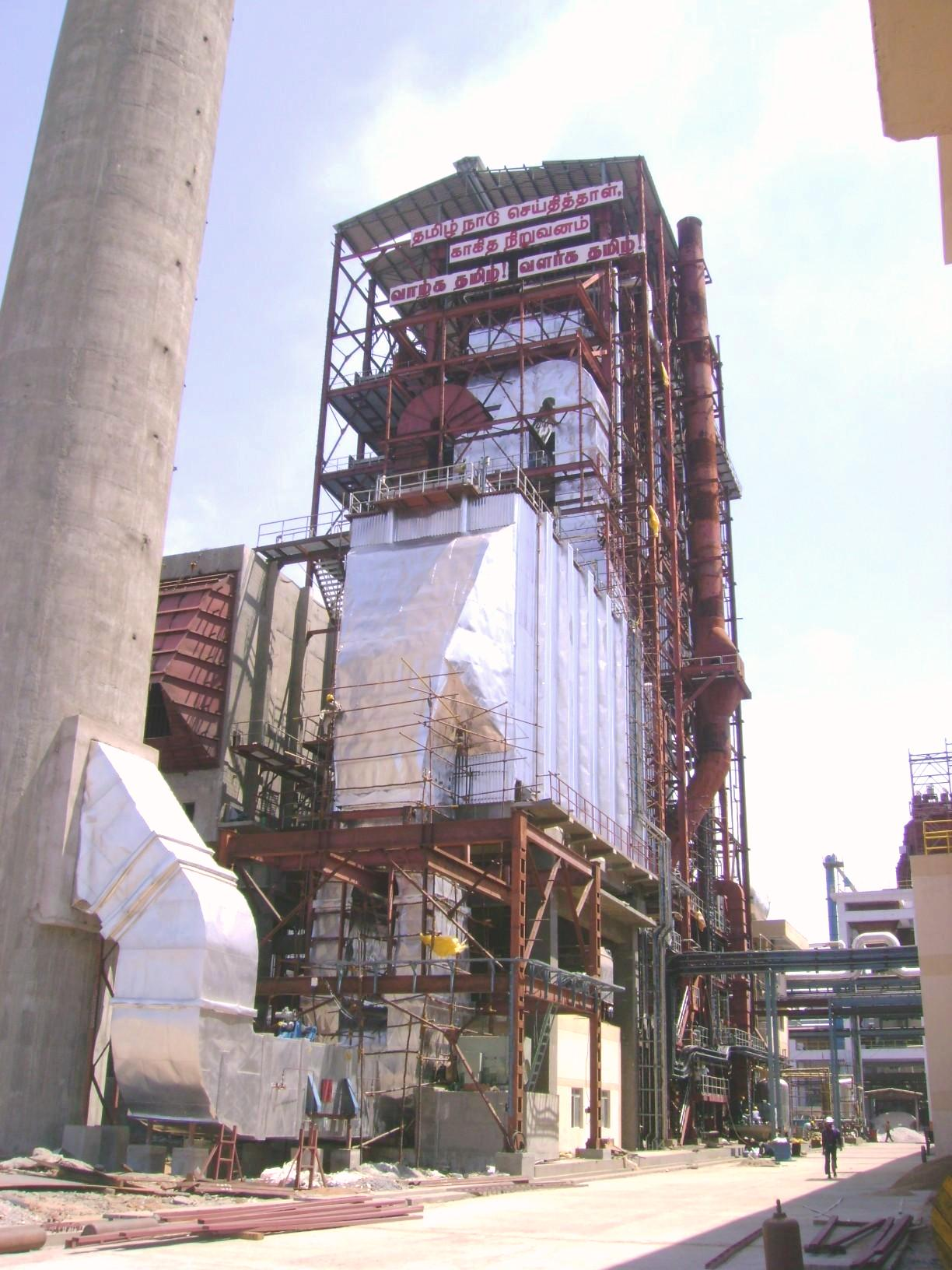
TNPL Chemical Recovery Boiler

The main occupation in Pugalur is agriculture. The crops grown are sugarcane, paddy, plantain, yuca or manioc (Maravalli kizhangu), groundnuts, maize, millet, and corn. In recent years coconut trees have become more popular with farmers. There is a Farmers' Market (ulavar santhai) in Velayuthampalayam where farmers sell agricultural commodities. In addition, every village and town panchayat has a Tamil Nadu Co-operative Society.

Employers include the EID Parry sugar factory in Pugalur, the textile industry in Karur, and the Tamil Nadu Newsprint and Papers Ltd (TNPL). TNPL is the largest producer of bagasse-based paper (made from sugarcane waste from sugar mills) in the world and is the second largest paper producer in Asia. It makes 4,00,000 tons of printing and writing paper and consumes one million tons of bagasse annually. It is 2.5 km (1.6 mi) away from Pugalur. TNPL also has a 22 MW co-generation power plant in Pugalur.

Banks and bank branches include Indian Overseas Bank in Nadayanur and Kandhampalayam, the Bank of India in Velayuthampalayam, the State Bank of India in Kagithapuram, the Lakshmi Vilas Bank in Pugalur, and the Dhanlakshmi Bank in Pugalur.

== Archaeology ==
Irumporai Cheras from Pugalur inscription

Arunattarmalai, Velayudhampalayam (Pugalur)

- Athan Che[ra]l Irumporai/Irumpurai
- Perum Kadungon
- Kadungon Ilam Kadungo

— Mahadevan, I. (2003). pp. 117–119.

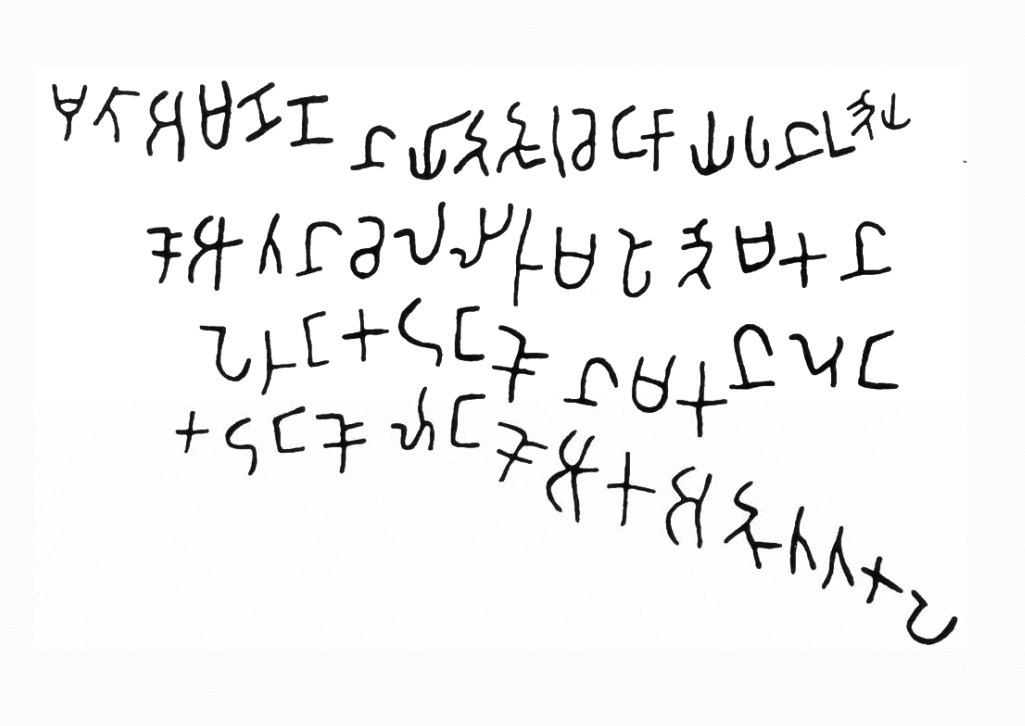
Brahmi inscription from Pugalur, near Karur

Archaeologists have discovered both epigraphic and numismatic evidence for the early Cheras.

- Two almost identical Tamil-Brahmi inscriptions discovered from Pugalur near Karur (c. second century CE; Arunattarmalai, Velayudhampalayam) describe three generations of Chera rulers. They record the construction of a rock shelter for Chenkayapan, a Jain monk, on the investiture of Kadungon Ilam Kadungo, son of Perum Kadungon, and the grandson of king Athan Che[ra]l Irumporai/Irumpurai.

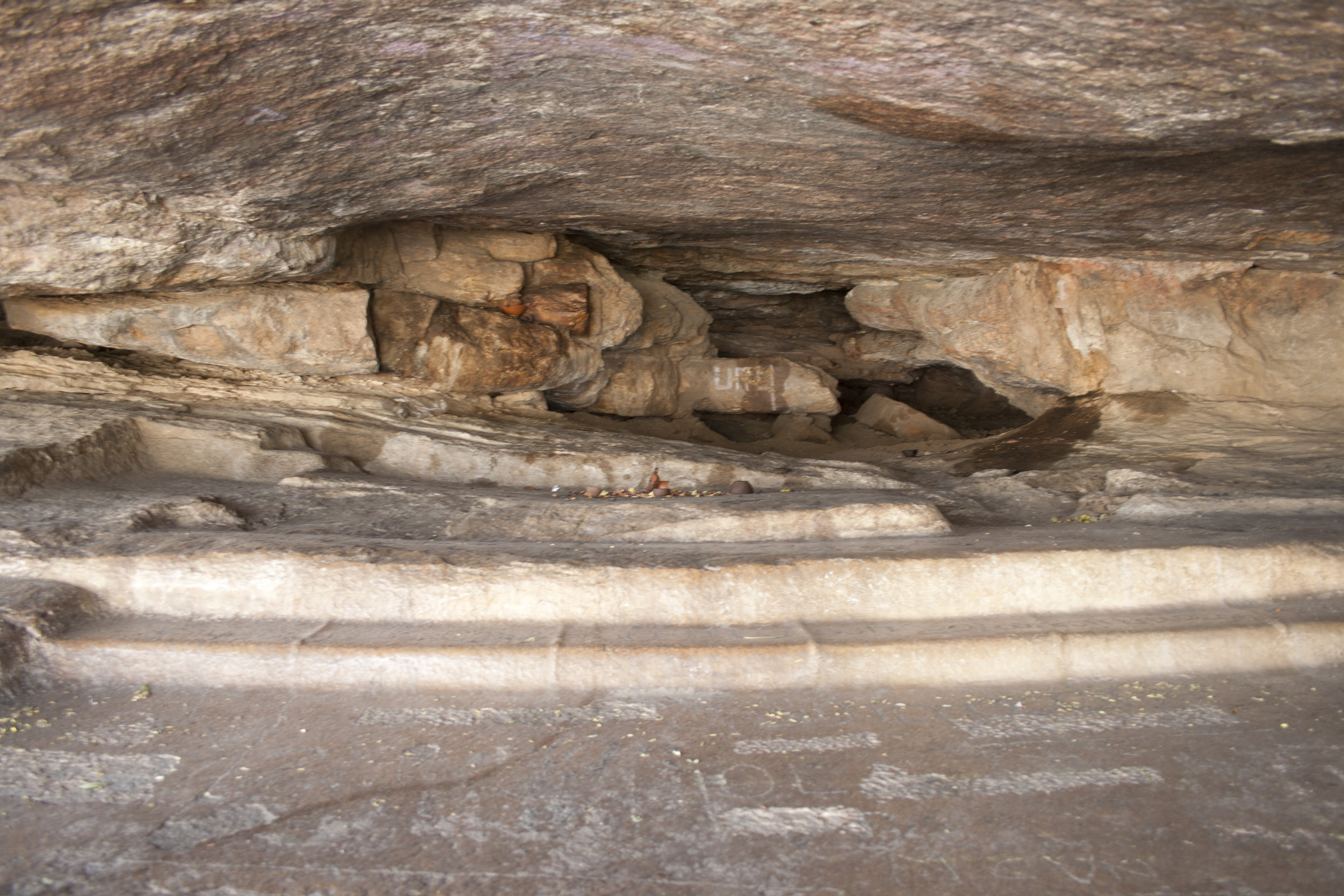
Chera Rock Shelter

== Arts and culture ==
=== Architecture ===
Nanaparappu Mariyamman is the most famous temple in the area. Sri Mariamman Temple is in the heart of the city and another famous temple of the Karur District. Other well-known temples in Pugalur include Vangal Temple, Vangal and Malaiamman Temple, Punjai Thottakurichi, Shree Kandiamman Temple, and Puliyamarathan Temple.

Arulmigu Megabaleeswarar, an 800-year-old temple, is located on the Kauvery River bank. It has an image of Lord Eswar facing west. The temple in Pugalur, dedicated to Lord Murugan, is on a hill northwest of Karur at Velayuthanpalayam. This temple is famous for its sculptures from the time of King Chera.

=== Festivals ===
Every year during the first week of February, Thaipusam is celebrated in the Pugalur temple. During Thaipusam, devotees take Kavadi to Pugalur temple and at night move a Theru (temple cart) with Lord Muruga around the hill with the help of chains. The Poomithi (walking on fire) festival is usually held in April (chithirai) and is the area's most important festival, with more than 2000 people participating. Temple festivals are also celebrated periodically during May by all age groups, irrespective of caste and creed.

=== Film and television ===
Most Pugalur residents have access to television. Movie theatres are located in Karur and Paramathi Velur.

=== Sports ===
The Rural Development Department established sports grounds for the village and town panchayats.

== Government ==
Pugalur is governed by the elected Directorate of Village panchayat, which has a president, vice-president, councilor, and members. Elections are held once every five years.

== Education ==
Pugalur's main elementary school is TNPL Matric School, which is accredited with Five Star status by Bharathidasan University, Trichy. Other schools include Pugalur Boys and Girls High School and Rangasamy Gounder Higher Secondary School.

M. Kumarasamy College of Engineering (MKCE), in nearby Thalavapalayam, is a landmark on National Highway No.7. The college is affiliated with Anna University, Chennai. It is approved by the All India Council of Technical Education. Kandaswami Kandar's College in Paramathi Velur is the arts and science college closest to Pugalur.

== Infrastructure ==
=== Transportation ===
General transportation is provided through private and government-operated buses. Pugalur has a railway station connected to Erode, Coimbatore, Trichy, Chennai, Madurai, Tuticorin, Palakad, Thrisur, Ernakulum, Bangalore, Nagercoil, Salem, and Mysore. Both passenger trains and express trains pass through this station.

The nearest airports are in Trichy (90 km [56 mi]), Coimbatore (112 km [70 mi]), and Madurai (156 km [97 mi]). The nearest major seaport is at Cochin (259 km), Thoothukudi (365 km [227 mi]) and Chennai (353 km [219 mi]).

=== Healthcare ===
There is Government General Hospital near Pugali Malai in Velayuthampalayam. The two main private hospitals are on the Karur-Velur highway and offer inpatient services. In addition, there are many small clinics run by doctors. The public goes to Paramathy Velur, Karur, Erode, Coimbatore, and Trichy for major medical and surgical services. This is also a primary healthcare center in Vangal.

=== Communication ===
Aircel, Airtel, BSNL, Reliance, Vodafone, and Tata DoCoMo are the communication providers in Pugalur. BSNL provides landline connections. Internet access is mostly dial-up, although BSNL offers a broadband internet connection. Post offices are in Velayuthampalayam, Nadayanur, TNPL Kagithapuram, and Paramathy Velur.

=== Police and emergency ===
A police station is located at Velayuthampalayam. The Rotary Club of Karur operates the Ambulance Service. Fire and Rescue are located at the Velayuthampalayam-Pugalur branch.
