= Tiruppur City Municipal Corporation =

Civic body of Tiruppur, Tamil Nadu, India

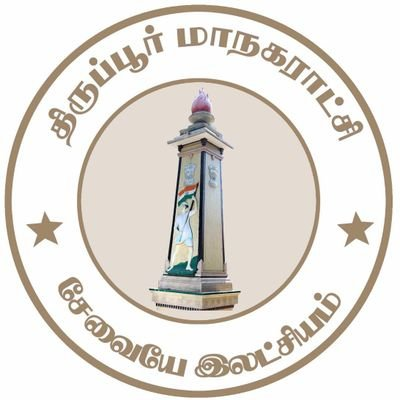

Type
- Type: Municipal Corporation of the Tiruppur

Leadership
- Mayor: Vacant
- Deputy Mayor: Thiru.R. Balasubramaniam, CPI
- Commissioner: M.P. AMITH, IAS
- District Collector: Dr. Narnaware Manish Shankarrao, IAS

Structure
- Seats: 60
- Political groups: Government (34): SPA (34) DMK (24) CPI (6) CPIM (4); Opposition (26): AIADMK+ (20) AIADMK (17) BJP (3); TVK+ (3) INC (3); Others (3); IND (3)

Elections
- Last election: 2022
- Next election: 2027

Website
- www.smarttiruppur.com

Tiruppur City Municipal Corporation is a civic body that governs Tiruppur, Tamil Nadu, India. The corporation consists of 60 wards each represented by a councilor. The Mayor elected by the council is the leader of the civic body.

== History ==
Tiruppur was formed as a small union and on 1 December 1947, it became a town with the inclusion of Mannarai, Thennamapalayam, Karuvampalayam, N.Pudhupalayam and Valipalayam villages. On 26 October 2008 it became a Municipal Corporation.

=== Areas under Tiruppur Corporation ===
- erstwhile Tirupur Municipality
- Nallur Municipality
- Velampalayam Municipality
- Andipalayam
- Muruganpalayam
- Neripperichal
- Thottipalayam
- Chettipalayam
- Mannarai
- Muthanampalayam
- Veerapandi
- Mangalam
- Kanakkampalayam
- Agrahara Periyapalayam
- Sarkar Periyapalayam
- Palangarai
- Kaniyampoondi
- Mudalipalayam
- Iduvampalayam
- Kalipalayam
- Perumanallur
- Karaipudur
- Nachipalayam

== Elected mayors ==
- N. Dinesh Kumar 2022 Onwards
