= Sottaiyur =

Neighbourhood in Karur district, Tamil Nadu, India

Coordinates: 11°17′N 76°52′E

- Village
- Interactive map of Sottaiyur
- Country: India
- State: Tamil Nadu
- District: Karur

Population (2011)
  - Total: 50

Languages
  - Official: Tamil
- Time zone: UTC+5:30 (IST)
- PIN: 639136
- Telephone code: 04324

Sottaiyur is a village located in Punjai Pugalur Municipality in Karur District in the Indian state of Tamil Nadu.

== Geography ==
It is very close to TNPL Pugalur and falls under its jurisdiction. Nearby villages include Nalliyampalayam, Onavakkalmedu, Sokkankadu, Moolimangalam, Pandipalayam, Masagoundanpudur and Palamapuram.

== Communication ==
BSNL, Aircel, Airtel, Tata Indicom, and Reliance are the communication providers, and landline connections are provided by BSNL. Internet access is not uncommon, with most citizens using dial-up connections.

== Transport ==
Transport facilities are limited, leading most people to commute by bicycles or motorcycles.

The nearby town of Pugalur has a railway station, which is connected to Erode, Coimbatore, Trichy, Chennai and Cochin. Both passenger trains and express trains pass through this station.

The nearest airport is in Trichy 87 km (54 miles) away and the nearest major airport is located at Coimbatore 115 km (71 miles) away.

== Entertainment ==
Theatres are available in Paramathi, Velur, and Karur, a few kilometers away. Most residents have access to satellite television channels, DVD players, and smartphones.

== Industries ==
The main industry of Sottaiyur is agriculture. Many citizens also work for TNPL paper company, and some are involved in animal husbandry. The agriculture business has improved tremendously, especially after the TEWLIS project, where effluent water is pumped from TNPL to Sottaiyur by pipelines.

== Infrastructure ==
TNPL gets water from the Thirukkattuthurai village, located at the banks of the Cauvery River. The main crops grown are sugarcane and rice.

== Education ==
The village has no schools. Children attend Moolimangalam Panchayat School, a primary Panchayat school. The schools teach in Tamil. The literacy rate in the village is around 30-40%. Older children attend TNPL Matriculation & Higher secondary school, Pugalur Public School or Pugalur Boys and Girls High School.

M. Kumarasamy College of Engineering (MKCE) at Thalavapalayam is located 5 km (3.1 miles) from Moolimangalam. The college is affiliated to the Anna University, Chennai and approved by the All India Council of Technical Education, New Delhi.

== Facilities ==
The village has a Pillaiyar temple, a small community hall (Samudhaaya Koodam), one public well, and a water tank and tap for drinking. The village has a kallu kattu, and an open stage with a neem tree in the center, where people chat with their neighbours.

== Festivals ==
The most famous festival is the Bhagavathi Amman festival, which is celebrated during the Tamil month of 'Panguni'. During this festival, the villagers invite all of their relatives to celebrate. The festival lasts for 2 days.

The second most famous festival is the Mariamman Festival. The temple is located in Nanaparappu, 2 km (1.2 miles) from the village. People celebrate Pongal and Deepavali.
