= Perumanallur =

- Town
- Location in Tamil Nadu, India Perumanallur (India)
- Coordinates: 11.2045800°N 77.3603100°E
- Country: India
- State: Tamil Nadu
- District: Tiruppur
- Named for: market

Population (2011)
  - Total: 7,356

Languages
  - Official: Tamil
- Time zone: UTC+5:30 (IST)
- PIN: 641666
- Telephone code: +91-421
- Vehicle registration: TN 39
- Nearest city: Tiruppur
- Lok Sabha constituency: Tiruppur

Perumanallur is a textile Industrial city situated near Tirupur, Tamil Nadu, India. Coimbatore city on the National Highway (NH 47) which now bypasses outside the town. It is a cross junction in NH-47 connecting Cochin/Coimbatore with Erode/Salem and Tirupur with Gobichettipalayam.

== Population ==
According to the 2011 Census of India, Perumanallur has a total population of 7,356, consisting of 3,740 males and 3,616 females. The literacy rate of the town stands at approximately 74%.

Primary Census Abstract 2011
Indicators	Persons	Males	Females
Population	7,356	3,740	3,616
Child Population	756	410	346
Scheduled Castes	899	467	432
Scheduled Tribes	0	0	0
Literate	5,465	2,962	2,503
Illiterate	1,891	778	1,113
Workers	3,413	2,318	1,095
Non Workers	3,943	1,422	2,521

== Economy ==
Permanallur has grown into an epicenter for textile industry. New Tirupur Industrial Park (Nethaji Apparel Park), which is an integrated industrial park, is 4 km away from Perumanallur. Saturday market at Perumanallur attracts people from neighbouring villages that buy and sell agricultural and other household products.

== Transport ==
All buses from Tirupur to Kunnathur, Nambiyur, Kanakkampalayam (Bus Nos. 10, 26A, 54, 26 and 43) pass through Perumanallur. The place is 11 km from Tirupur and 6 km from Avinashi.

== Adjacent communities ==
- Coimbatore
- Avinashi
- Tiruppur
- Chengapalli
- Nambiyur
- Kunnathur
- Vijayamangalam
- Gobichettipalayam
- Perundurai
- Mangalam
- Palladam
- Sevur
- Veerapandi
- Thirumuruganpoondi
- Tiruppur New Bus stand
- Boyampalayam
