= Vijayapuri, Erode district =

Census town in India

Vijayamangalam
- Town
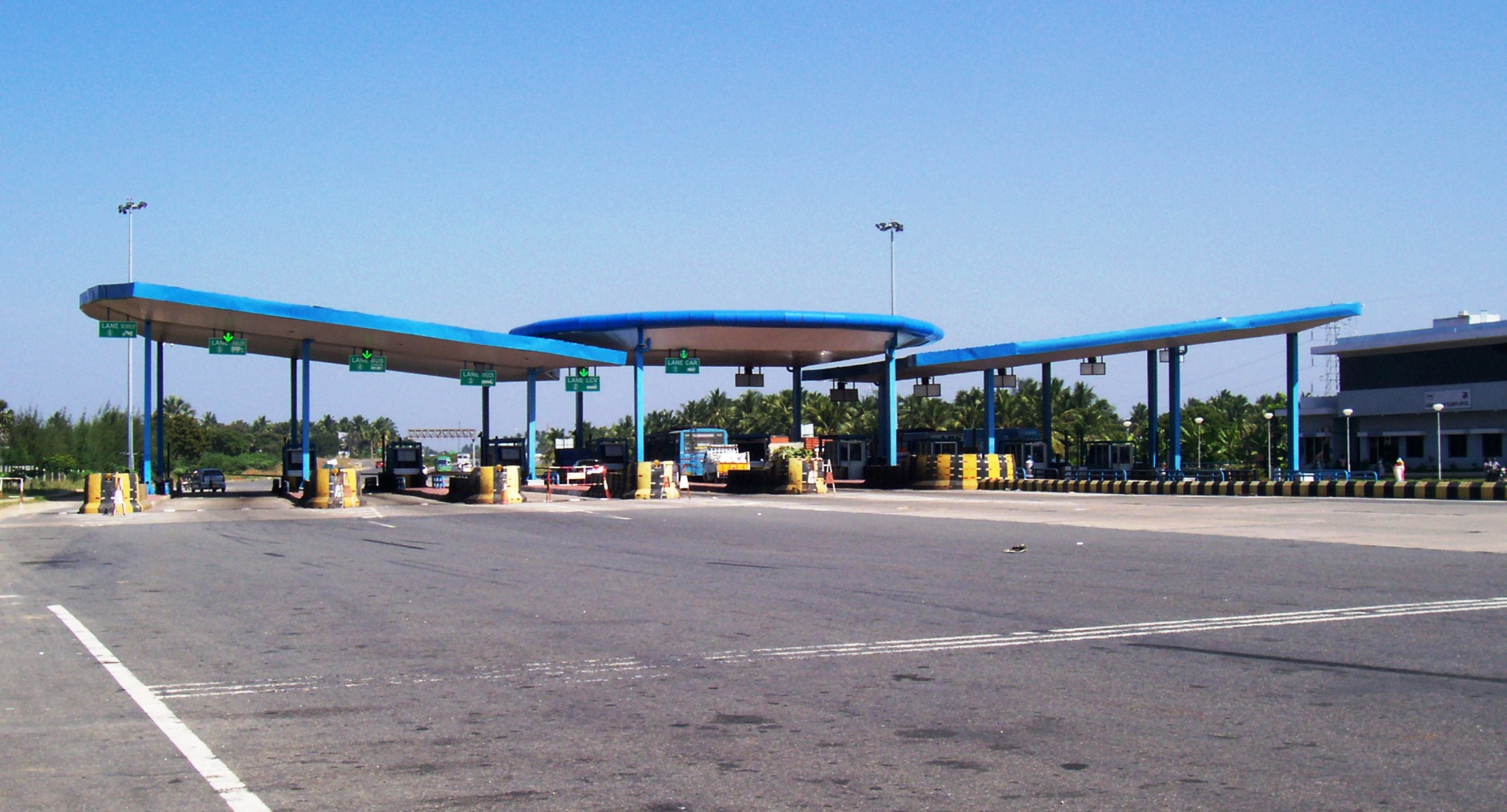
- NH47 Toll Plaza at Vijayamangalam On Coimbatore-Salem National highway

- Location in Tamil Nadu, India Vijayamangalam (India)
- Coordinates: 11.23°N 77.5°E
- Country: India
- State: Tamil Nadu
- District: Erode
- Elevation: 303 m (994 ft)

Population (2011)
  - Total: 6,517

Languages
  - Official: Tamil
- Time zone: UTC+5:30 (IST)
- PIN: 638056
- Vehicle registration: TN-56

Vijayamangalam is a census town in Erode district in the Indian state of Tamil Nadu. It is located on National Highway 47 (NH-47) between Perundurai and Perumanallur.

== Geography ==
Vijayapuri (also known as Vijayamangalam) is located at 11.23°N 77.5°E along NH-47 (bypass). It is the junction point for Tiruppur and Coimbatore towards Salem. A new toll plaza on a four-lane road is located very close to Vijayamangalam on the Coimbatore-Salem section. It has an average elevation of 303 metres (994 feet).

It is 33 kilometers west of the district headquarters in Erode. 12 km from Perundurai, and 422 km from the state capital Chennai. Kaikolapalayam (3 km), Mettupudur ( 1 km ), Kalliampudur (1.5 km), Moongilpalayam (1 km ), Pagallayur (1.5 km), Thottipalayam (2.5 km), Kovilpalayam (1 km), Ponmudi (5 km), Periyaveerasangili (4 km), and Karandipalayam (5 km) are the nearby villages to Vijayamangalam. Vijayamangalam is surrounded by Uttukkuli Taluk towards the south, Chennimalai Taluk towards the east, Tiruppur Taluk towards the west, and Nambiyur Taluk towards the north.

Uthukuli, Perumanallur, Tiruppur, Chengapalli, Erode, Gobichettipalayam, Perundurai, Avinashi, Chennimalai, Bhavani are the nearby cities to Vijayamangalam.

== Demographics ==
As of the 2011 Census, the total population of Vijayapuri is 7,222, out of which 3,636 are males and 3,586 are females; thus, the Average Sex Ratio of Vijayapuri is 986.

The population of children aged 0-6 years in Vijayapuri city is 706, which is 10% of the total population. There are 344 male children and 362 female children between the ages of 0 and 6. Thus, as per the 2011 Census, the Child Sex Ratio of Vijayapuri is 1,052, which is greater than the Average Sex Ratio (986).

As per the 2011 Census, the literacy rate of Vijayapuri is 78%. Thus, Vijayapuri has a higher literacy rate compared to 72.6% of Erode district. The male literacy rate is 86.21% and the female literacy rate is 69.73% in Vijayapuri.

== Transport ==
Vijyamangalam is well connected with roads and railways.

The Salem-to-Ernakulam Highway (NH-47) passes through this town. The town connects Salem, Erode, Perundurai, Avinashi, Kangayam, Bhavani, Coimbatore, Nasiyanur, Chengapalli, Chennimalai, Ingur, Perumanallur, and Tiruppur by roadways.

The Vijayamangalam Railway Station (VZ), Uthukuli Railway Station, and Perundurai Railway Station are the nearby railway stations to Vijayamangalam. However, the Erode Junction railway station is the major railway station, 30 km from Vijayamangalam. The Tiruppur railway station is 25 km away.

== Temples ==
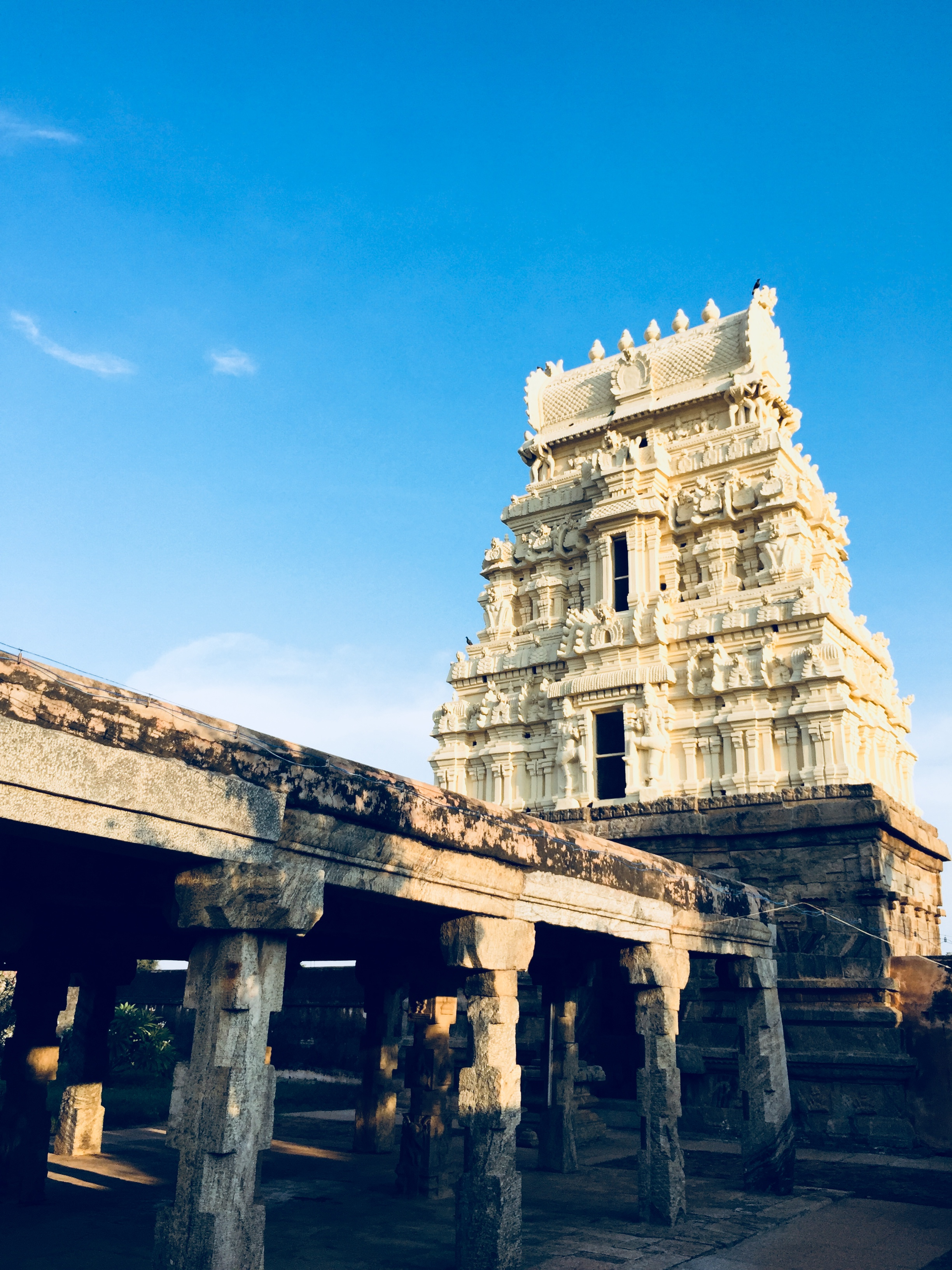
Vijayamangalam Jain temple

- Vijayamangalam Jain temple: This town was an ancient settlement of Jains. Vijayamangalam Jain temple was built c. 678 C.E. by King Konguvelir. This temple is dedicated to Chandraprabha, the eighth Tirthankara of Jainism.
- Sri Nageswaraswamy Shiva Temple
- Sri Karivaradharaja Perumal Temple
- Sri Vijayapuri Amman Temple
- Arasanna Malai Agneeshwarar and Arasathal Temple (Kongampalayam) - on every fullmoon day, 3000 people attend girivalam
- Sri Ranganayaki Amman temple

== Economy ==
The major occupations around Vijayamangalam and surrounding areas are weaving and agriculture. A lot of handlooms, power looms and automatic looms are seen running as small and medium-sized businesses around this area. The textiles are sold in Kerala, Andhra Pradesh, and North India. The major market for the produced textiles is the Erode city textile market, called Gani Textile Market.

Vintex is one of the foremost co-operative companies formed by the weaving community, which has been regarded as the sole propeller of the uplift of this area's people. Agriculture was the main source of income during the independence era, but the textile industry developed the town's economy. Vintex is seen as an industrial revolution for this area, as it made a lot of people think of weaving as a source of income next to agriculture.

== Educational Institutions near Vijayamangalam ==
=== Colleges ===
- Sasurie College of Engineering
- Kongu Engineering College
- Institute of Road & Transport Technology
- IRT Perundurai Medical College
- EICT Polytechnic College
- Sri Ramanathan College of Engineering

=== Schools ===
- Roots Matriculation School
- Bharathi Matriculation Higher Secondary School
- Vijay Vikas International School
