= TNPL =

TNPL may refer to:

- Tamil Nadu Newsprint and Papers Limited, a paper company based in Chennai, India
- Tamil Nadu Premier League, T20 cricket league played in Tamil Nadu, India
- TNPL Pugalur, a panchayat town in Karur district in the Indian state of Tamil Nadu
