= Moolimangalam =

Moolimangalam Mooli Mangalam
- urban area
- Nickname: Moovai
- Location in Tamil Nadu, India
- Coordinates: 11°2′15″N 78°0′11″E
- Country: India
- State: Tamil Nadu
- District: Karur
- Elevation: 125 m (410 ft)

Languages
  - Official: Tamil
- Time zone: UTC+5:30 (IST)
- PIN: 639136
- Telephone code: 04324

Moolimangalam (Moolimangalam) is a small urban area located in Karur district in the Indian state of Tamil Nadu. It occupies the 3rd and 4th wards of Tamil Nadu Kagitha Alai Town Panchayat.

== Etymology ==
The name Mooligaimangalam is derived from the rare 'Mooligai' plant found in the village. Eventually, it was changed to Moolimangalam.

== Geography ==
Moolimangalam is 11 km (6.8 mi) northwest of Karur and just south of the Tamil Nadu Newsprint and Papers complex at TNPL Pugalur. Adjacent villages include Sottaiyur, Kurukkapalayam, Sokkankadu, Pandipalayam, Masagoundanpudur, Pazhamapuram, Thadampalayam and Ponniagoundanpudur.

== Demographics ==
Mooligaimangalam consists of roughly 400 homes and a population of 2,000 people.

Cricket is the sport of choice among Moolimangalam children.

== Communication ==
Mobile telecommunication is available in the area. BSNL provides landline connections. Internet connectivity is fair (mostly dial-up connections).

== Transport ==
Mooligaimangalam has a good transportation system made up of private minibusses and government-run buses. Most people commute by bicycle or motorcycle.

The nearby town Pugalur (Code:PGR) has a railway station which connects to Erode, Coimbatore, Trichy, Chennai, and Cochin. Passenger trains and express trains pass through the station.

The nearest airport is in Trichy (87 km [54 mi]). The major Airport is located at Coimbatore (115 km [71 mi]).

== Economy ==
Many citizens work at TNPL. TNPL gets water from Thirukkattuthurai Village Panchayat located in the Cauvery river bank.

Agriculture is the main industry. Agribusiness made significant improvements after the TEWLIS project allowed effluent water to be pumped from TNPL into the village. Sugarcane and paddy are the primary crops, but coconut trees have grown in popularity.

Textiles are also a viable industry.

=== Clonal research center ===
TNPL commissioned a state-of-the-art clonal propagation centre with a capacity to produce 10 crore clonal plants a year. The centre is said to be the largest clonal production, research and development centre in a single location in India.

== Education ==
Moolimangalam has one primary Panchayat school, taught in the Tamil language. The literacy rate is around 30-40%. In recent days, because of increased awareness around the importance of literacy, children attend TNPL Matriculation & Higher secondary school, Pugalur Public School, Pugalur Boys, and Girls High School.

M. Kumarasamy College of Engineering (MKCE), Thalavapalayam, is the major engineering college near the town. The college is located 5 kilometers away from Moolimangalam and is affiliated to Anna University, Chennai. It is accredited by the All India Council of Technical Education, New Delhi.

This town has produced lawyers, doctors, and many engineering graduates who work in multinational companies.

== Government and politics ==
ADMK and DMK are the primary political parties.

=== Amenities ===
The village boasts one public library, two public wells, and many water taps maintained by the TNPL Panchayat

== Festivals ==
The Mariamman festival takes place around temple in Nanaparappu, 4 kilometers from town. People celebrate Pongal and Deepavali (conducting adal padal by youngsters).

During Pongal, village youngsters conduct a sports program for three days with prizes.

The primary festival is Sellandiamman festival, which is celebrated during the Tamil month of 'Panguni'. During this festival, the villagers invite their relatives. The festival lasts for 3 days. The staged drama (Natakam, in Tamil) and Adal Padal is the most popular entertainment show there.
