= Thottipalayam =

- Neighbourhood
- Location in Tamil Nadu, India
- Coordinates: 11°08′51″N 77°21′54″E
- Country: India
- State: Tamil Nadu
- District: Tiruppur

Area
  - Total: 5.69 km^{2} (2.20 sq mi)

Population (2011)
  - Total: 40,503
  - Density: 7,120/km^{2} (18,400/sq mi)

Languages
  - Official: Tamil
- Time zone: UTC+5:30 (IST)

Thottipalayam is a census town and neighbourhood in Tiruppur in the Indian state of Tamil Nadu. Located in the western part of the state, it is part of the Tiruppur North taluk in Tiruppur district. It was integrated into the Tiruppur Municipal Corporation in 2011. Spread across an area of 5.69 km^{2} (2.20 sq mi), it had a population of 40,503 individuals as per the 2011 census.

== Geography and administration ==
Thottipalayam is located in Tiruppur North taluk of Tiruppur district in the Indian state of Tamil Nadu. Spread across an area of 5.69 km^{2} (2.20 sq mi), it is a census town and neighbourhood of Tiruppur. It was integrated into the Tiruppur Municipal Corporation in 2011. The region has a tropical climate with hot summers and mild winters. The highest temperatures are recorded in April and May, with lowest recordings in December-January. The town forms part of the Avanashi Assembly constituency that elects its member to the Tamil Nadu legislative assembly and the Nilgiris Lok Sabha constituency that elects its member to the Parliament of India.

== Demographics ==
As per the 2011 census, Thottipalayam had a population of 40,503 individuals across 11,354 households. The population saw an increase compared to the previous census in 2001 when 26,818 inhabitants were registered. The population consisted of 20,573 males and 19,930 females. About 5,014 individuals were below the age of six years. About 9.5% of the population belonged to scheduled castes. The entire population is classified as urban. The town has an average literacy rate of 84.7%.

About 51.4% of the eligible population were employed full-time. Hinduism was the majority religion which was followed by 92.9% of the population, with Christianity (4.3%) and Islam (2.7%) being minor religions.
