= Poosaripalayam =

Village in Uthukuli, Tamil Nadu, India

Poosaripalayam village is located in Chengappalli panchayath, Uthukuli taluk in the state of Tamil Nadu.

Nearby cities are Uthukuli, Chengapalli, Tiruppur, Erode, Coimbatore, Kangeyam and Gobi. The area has a lot of temples such as Mariamman Temple, Vinayagar Temple, Karuvalur Mariamman Temple, Chenni Aandavar Temple and Karupparaayan Temple. The land in the area is very dry and rocky.

== Economy ==
The people in the village have predominantly been farmers, farming goats, cows and oxen. More recently there are Banian Companies, Knitting Companies and Powerlooms.

== Transport ==
Bus are available from Tiruppur, Uthukuli and Chengapalli. A railway is station available at 2 km Uttukuli and 10 km Tiruppur railway station also available.
