= Kumaramangalam =

Kumaramangalam Kumaaramangalam
- village
- Location in Tamil Nadu, India Kumaramangalam (India)
- Coordinates: 11.367574°N 77.930017°E
- Country: India
- State: Tamil Nadu
- District: Namakkal

Population (2011)
  - Total: 15,522

Languages
  - Official: Tamil
- Time zone: UTC+5:30 (IST)
- PIN: 637205
- Telephone code: 914288
- Vehicle registration: TN34
- Nearest city: Thiruchengode
- Lok Sabha constituency: Namakkal
- Vidhan Sabha constituency: Thiruchengode

Kumaramangalam is a village in Namakkal district in Tamil Nadu state in India.

Kumaramangalam is an ancient village near Tiruchengodu, located on a busy state highway between Erode and Namakkal. It houses many engineering, Arts and nursing colleges. In the heart of the city there is a centuries-old Paandeeswaran temple with a huge stone made pond. Kumaramangalam is a traditional Tamil village where there are numerous temples and people lives with culture and harmony. One of the pre independence chief minister of Madras presidency and freedom fighter Dr. P Subbarayan is from Kumaramangalam.

== History ==
We could able to back trace the history of Kumaramangalam only from the 17th century; during that time it was under the rule of Mysore Empire. The well-known Zamin of Kumaramangalam Nanjayya, who built the Kalingarayan dam on the Bhavani river and check dam near Poolampatty near Kumarapalayam, are still serving the people in this area. He constructed a Manimandapam on the Thiruchengodu Hill for Ardhanareeswarar devotees. He did all these activities under the Mughal emperors of Mysore. During that time Kumaramangalam was a well-known Zamin at the kingdom of Mysore.

== Demographics ==
As of 2011 India census, Kumaramangalam had a population of 15522 with 7784 males and 7738 females. Most of the people belong to Kongu Vellalar and Sengunthar Mudaliar community. The pincode for Kumaramangalam, Namakkal district is 637205.

== Business ==
Agriculture and Textiles are the main business. Total population is distributed among weavers, farmers and agricultural labors. Power looms or Auto looms plays a major role in the Kumaramangalam's economy. There is a weekly market (Sandhai) operates every Tuesday near Paandeeswaran temple where all the farmers and local vendors of nearby villages sell their commodities to the people.

== Transportation ==
Bus

As it is located at the very busy highway, there is a round-the-clock bus facility connecting Kumaramangalam with the nearby towns. There are express buses operated via Kumaramangalam to cities like Trichy, Coimbatore, Tirupur, Omalur, Sankagiri, Duraiyur etc. There are local buses and mini buses operated from Kumaramagalam to Thiruchengodu, Kandampalayam and Kolaram which serves all the nearby villages.

Train

Nearest railway station is Shankaragiri, which is just 10 km away from Kumaramangalam.

Air

Salem Airport is the nearest airport for Kumaramangalam; it is a 90-minute drive from there. Coimbatore and Trichy are the other airports nearer to Kumaramagalam.
