= Andipalayam (Tirupur) =

- Neighbourhood
- Location in Tamil Nadu, India
- Coordinates: 11°5′59″N 77°18′39″E
- Country: India
- State: Tamil Nadu
- District: Tiruppur

Area
  - Total: 9.01 km^{2} (3.48 sq mi)

Population (2011)
  - Total: 25,539
  - Density: 2,830/km^{2} (7,340/sq mi)

Languages
  - Official: Tamil
- Time zone: UTC+5:30 (IST)

Andipalayam is a census town and neighbourhood in Tiruppur in the Indian state of Tamil Nadu. Located in the western part of the state, it is part of the Tiruppur South taluk in Tiruppur district. It was integrated into the Tiruppur Municipal Corporation in 2011. Spread across an area of 9.01 km^{2} (3.48 sq mi), it had a population of 25,539 individuals as per the 2011 census.

== Geography and administration ==
Andipalayam is located in Tiruppur South taluk of Tiruppur district in the Indian state of Tamil Nadu. Spread across an area of 9.01 km^{2} (3.48 sq mi), it is a census town and neighbourhood of Tiruppur. It was integrated into the Tiruppur Municipal Corporation in 2011. The region has a tropical climate with hot summers and mild winters. The highest temperatures are recorded in April and May, with lowest recordings in December-January. The town forms part of the Palladam Assembly constituency that elects its member to the Tamil Nadu legislative assembly and the Coimbatore Lok Sabha constituency that elects its member to the Parliament of India.

== Demographics ==
As per the 2011 census, Andipalayam had a population of 25,539 individuals across 7,010 households. The population saw a marginal increase compared to the previous census in 2001 when 11,350 inhabitants were registered. The population consisted of 12,773 males and 12,766 females. About 3,216 individuals were below the age of six years. About 10.1% of the population belonged to scheduled castes. The entire population is classified as urban. The town has an average literacy rate of 83.7%.

About 49.2% of the eligible population were employed full-time. Hinduism was the majority religion which was followed by 94% of the population, with Christianity (3.5%) and Islam (1.4%) being minor religions.
