= Mangalam, Tiruppur =

Mangalam
- census town
- Location in Tamil Nadu, India Mangalam (India)
- Coordinates: 11.095°N 77.266°E
- Country: India
- State: Tamil Nadu
- District: Tiruppur
- Elevation: 32 m (105 ft)

Population (2001)
  - Total: 7,892

Languages
  - Official: Tamil
- Time zone: UTC+5:30 (IST)

Mangalam is a census town in Tiruppur district in the Indian state of Tamil Nadu.

== Geography ==
Mangalam is located at 11.095°N 77.266°E. It has an average elevation of 32 metres (104 feet). It is located 1 kilometer toward the South from District headquarters Tirupur. Mangalam is surrounded by Avanashi Taluk towards North Uttkkuli, Taluk towards East.

== Neighborhoods ==
- Avinashi
- Tiruppur
- Vaazhaithottathu Ayyankoil
- Samalapuram
- Somanur
- Karumathampatti
- Karuvampalayam
- Sultanpet
- Palladam
- Agrahaarapudhur
- Velayuthampalayam
- Andipalayam
- Karanampettai

== Demographics ==
According to the 2001 Census of India, Mangalam, Tamil Nadu had a population of 7,892. Males constituted 51% of the population and females 49%. Mangalam had an average literacy rate of 67%, higher than the national average of 59.5%; male literacy was 76%, and female literacy was 59%. In Mangalam, 13% of the population was under 6 years of age. Mangalam was the first village to have 100% financial inclusion, where all households of this village were able to participate in banking.
