= TNPL Pugalur =

- Locality
- Location in Tamil Nadu, India
- Coordinates: 11.0488°N 77.9977°E
- Country: India
- State: Tamil Nadu
- Region: Kongu Nadu
- District: Karur

Government
  - Type: Municipality
  - Body: Punjai Pugalur Municipality

Population (2001)
  - Total: 5,880

Languages
  - Official: Tamil
- Time zone: UTC+5:30 (IST)
- PIN: 639
- Telephone code: 04324

TNPL Kagithapuram is a Locality of Punjai Pugalur Municipality in Karur district in the Indian state of Tamil Nadu.

== Demographics ==
As of 2001 India census, Kagithapuran, Karur had a population of 5880. Males constitute 51% of the population and females 49%. Pugalur has an average literacy rate of 72%, higher than the national average of 59.5%: male literacy is 79%, and female literacy is 75%. In Pugalur, 8% of the population is under 6 years of age. Its surface area is around 8 square kilometre.

== Villages/towns in Kagithapuram ==
TNPL, a large paper mill, is based in Kagithapuram.

The other small towns/villages located in this panchayat are TNPL, Moolimangalam, Sottaiyur Velayuthampalayam, Pandipalayam, Sokkankadu, Thirukkaduthurai are Kandampalayam. The big nearest large city to Kagithapuram is Karur.

Pughazhi Malai is a temple situated on a mount, Aarunaatan Malai, in the centre of the town. The temple is devoted to Lord Muruga.

== Communication ==
BSNL, Aircel, Airtel, Reliance, Vodafone are the communication providers to the town Panchayat. The landline connections are provided by BSNL. The Internet is mostly dial-up. BSNL provide a broadband Internet connection.

== Transport ==
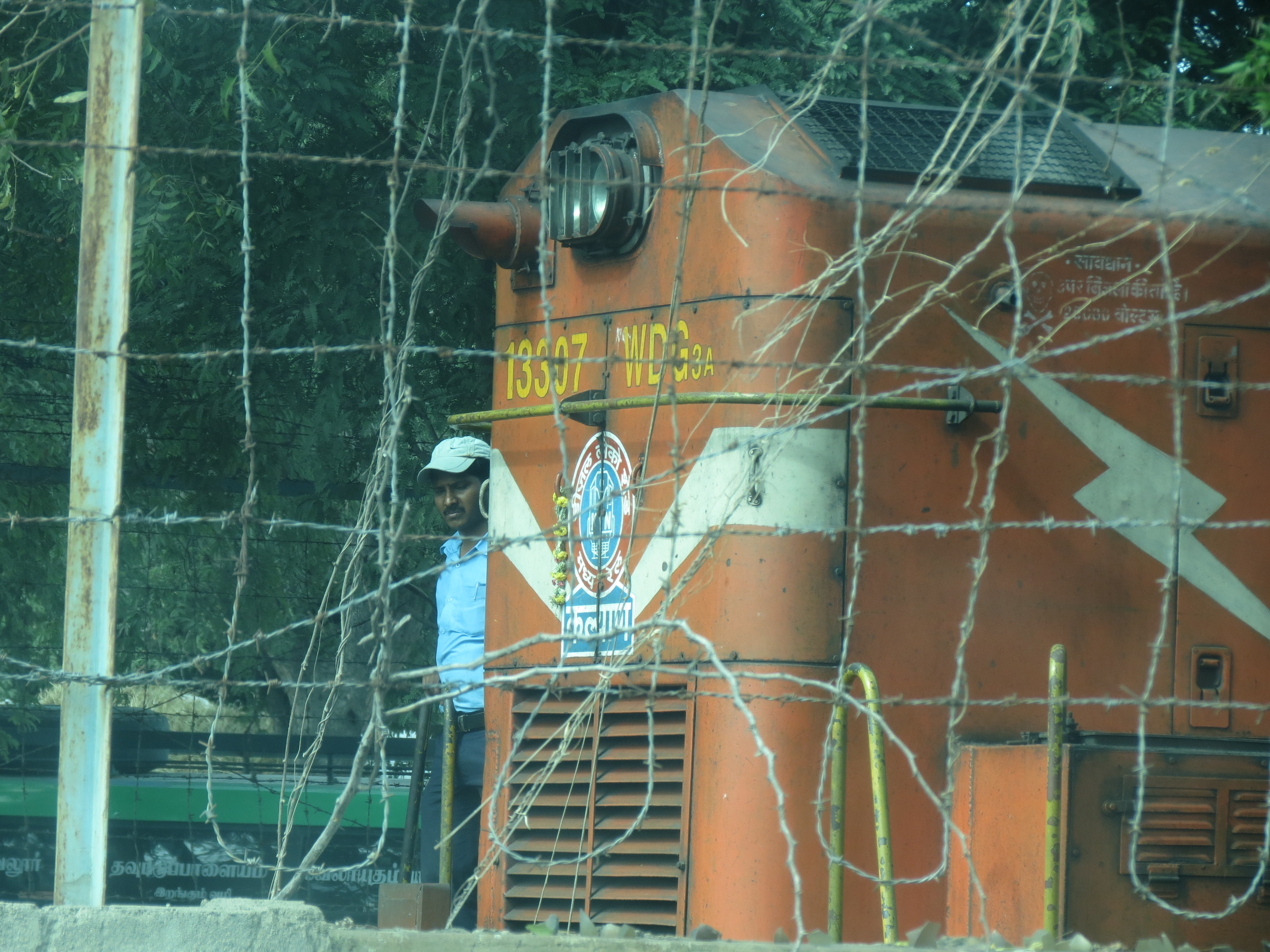
A WDG3A at a team track involved in carrying goods for TNPL.

The town is well connected by road and rail. By road, it is connected to other parts of the districts by Government and Private-run buses. Yet Karur continues to common place for passengers travelling to other parts of state and other states. By rail, it has Pugalur railway station (Code: PGR) falling under Salem division, where almost every passenger and express trains stop at the station for passengers travelling to Chennai, Trichy, Thanjavur, Madurai, Nagercoil, Bangalore, Mysore, Mangalore, Palakkad and Ernakulam. TNPL has its own team track diverting from the Trichy - Erode railway line which facilitates its freight services.

The nearest airports are Tiruchirappalli (87 kilometres (54 mi)) and Coimbatore (115 kilometres (71 mi)). The nearest major railway junction is at Karur (13 kilometres (8.1 mi)).

== Governance ==
It is governed by the Directorate of Town panchayat which has A Chairperson, Vice-chair and 12 ward councillors. They are the elected representatives of the town. Elections are conducted every five years.

== Education ==
The town Panchayat has three primary Tamil-medium schools, in Moolimangalam Moolimangalam, Masagoundanpudur and Kurukkapalayam. The most famous school in the town is TNPL Matriculation & Higher Secondary School, accredited with Five Star Status by Bharathidasan University, Trichy was established in 1984. The school is located within the TNPL Housing colony. Its students have entered the top medical and engineering colleges of the country. A grand Silver Jubilee celebration was celebrated on 19 December 2009.

== Talent-Expo ==
Recognizing the fact that today's youth are the future of India, TNPL conducts "Talent-Expo" providing a platform to the students from rural and semi urban areas to exhibit their talents. In the Talent-Expo 2008–09, 1200 students from 55 schools participated in 23 competitions.
