= Neripperichal =

- Town
- Location in Tamil Nadu, India
- Coordinates: 11°10′00″N 77°22′27″E
- Country: India
- State: Tamil Nadu
- District: Tirupur

Population (2001)
  - Total: 15,632

Languages
  - Official: Tamil
- Time zone: UTC+5:30 (IST)
- Vehicle registration: TN 39

Neripperichal is a census town in Tirupur district in the Indian state of Tamil Nadu.

== Demographics ==
As of 2001 India census, Neripperichal had a population of 15,632. Males constitute 52% of the population and females 48%. Neripperichal has an average literacy rate of 65%, higher than the national average of 59.5%: male literacy is 74%, and female literacy is 56%. In Neripperichal, 12% of the population is under 6 years of age.
