= Salapalayam =

- Village
- Nickname: Salapatti
- Location in Tamil Nadu, India Salapalayam (India)
- Coordinates: 11.22°N 78.23°E
- Country: India
- State: Tamil Nadu
- District: Namakkal நாமக்கல்
- Elevation: 218 m (715 ft)

Population (2011)
  - Total: 440
  - Density: 100/km^{2} (260/sq mi)

Languages
  - Official: Tamil
- Time zone: UTC+5:30 (IST)
- PIN: 637 002
- Telephone code: 91 - 4286
- Vehicle registration: TN 88

Salapalayam is one of the villages in the Namakkal District in which there are about 250 families. In the village the majority of the people are from Kongu Vellalar and few Arunthathiyar.

- Nearest Post Office : Reddipatti
- Occupation of people: Agriculture, road haulage.
- Total Families: 250
- Nearest town: Namakkal
- Nearest State HighWay: SH 161 Thuraiyur–Namakkal road
