= Thirukkattuthurai =

- Village
- Country: India
- State: Tamil Nadu
- District: Karur

Languages
  - Official: Tamil
- Time zone: UTC+5:30 (IST)
- PIN: 639113
- Telephone code: 91-(0)4324
- Vehicle registration: TN 47

Thirukkattuthurai is a small village located in Karur District in Tamil Nadu, India. It is the first of the three wards of the Thirukkattuthurai village panchayat, and is located on the bank of the Kaveri. It is about 4.5 km from TNPL Pugalur.

== Demographics ==
According to latest 2011 Indian census, Thirukkattuthurai has a population of 3011; consisting of 944 families of which the male population is 1458 and the female 1553. The sex ratio is 1065 comparable to the state ratio of 996. 7.21 percent of the population under six years of age. The literacy rate is 74.84 percent compared to the state average of 80.09 percent. Literacy stands at 85.82 percent for men and 64.72 percent for women. 12.85 percent of the total population is composed of Schedule Castes.

== Governance ==
The area is governed by the directorate of the village panchayat, which has a president, vice president, one councilor (per ward) and nine members (for three wards), who are all elected representatives of the village. Elections are conducted once in every five years.
