= Kattipalayam =

- village
- Location in Tamil Nadu, India Kattipalayam (India)
- Coordinates: 11°19′16″N 78°1′45″E
- Country: India
- State: Tamil Nadu

Languages
  - Official: Tamil
- Time zone: UTC+5:30 (IST)

Kattipalayam is a hamlet in Tamil Nadu, India. It is located between Namakkal and Tiruchengodu on the state highway connecting the district headquarters within the village of Mamundi Agraharam. Agriculture is the main source of income for most of the inhabitants of this village. In the 2011 census it had 102 households.
