= Kattur (Koohur) =

Kuhoor Ghuhaneshwaram (Historical name)
- village
- Country: India
- State: Tamil Nadu
- District: Thanjavur

Population (2001)
  - Total: 1,471

Languages
  - Official: Tamil
- Time zone: UTC+5:30 (IST)
- Postal code: 621703

Kattur is a village in the Lalgudi taluk of Thanjavur district, Tamil Nadu, India.

== Demographics ==
As per the 2001 census, Koohur (Thirunallakoorur) had a total population of 1471 with 743 males and 728 females. The sex ratio was 980. The literacy rate was 87.57
