= Kandampalayam =

Kandampalayam is a Panchayat in Paramathi-Velur taluk of Namakkal District, in the state of Tamil Nadu in India.

== Location ==
Kandampalayam is in south India in the state of Tamil Nadu, approximately 14 km from the town Tiruchengode. It is located in State Highway SH-86..

== Agriculture ==
The main crops cultivated here are peanut, sorghum (cholam) coconut, yam, and palmyra.

== Including Panchayat areas ==
Kandampalayam is part of two panchayats: Nallur and Maniyanoor. Kandampalayam is located along Main Road within the Nallur village jurisdiction and is served by the Kandampalayam Sub Post Office (PIN 637203).

Kandhampalayam
- village panchayat
- Location in Tamil Nadu, India
- Coordinates: 11°16′14.42″N 77°56′42.08″E
- Country: India
- State: Tamil Nadu
- District: Namakkal
- Elevation: 230 m (750 ft)

Languages
  - Official: Tamil
- Time zone: UTC+5:30 (IST)
- PIN: 637(203)
- Telephone code: 91-(0)4268
- Vehicle registration: TN-88

== Economy ==
Agriculture and dairy farming form the primary livelihoods in Kandampalayam and its surrounding panchayat areas, supported by a local milk producers' cooperative society affiliated with the Namakkal District Co-operative Milk Producers' Union (Aavin, Regn. No. NMR 180). Non-agricultural employment in the locality includes small-scale textile weaving, iron and steel fabrication, and borewell drilling rig operations.

== Infrastructure and public services ==
- Postal services: The area is served by the Kandampalayam Sub Post Office (PIN 637203), located on Main Road within the Nallur village jurisdiction.
- Healthcare: Public healthcare is provided through the Government Primary Health Center (PHC) serving Nallur Kandampalayam.
- Administration and elections: Electorally, Kandampalayam falls under the Paramathi-Velur Assembly constituency (AC 95) and the Namakkal Lok Sabha constituency (PC 16).

== Education ==
Kandampalayam serves as the educational cluster headquarters for surrounding habitations in the Paramathi block, overseeing 26 government and private schools.

Schools located within Kandampalayam and M. Kandampalayam include:

- Government Higher Secondary School (GHSS), Kandampalayam (UDISE: 33091400106) – Offers classes 6 to 12.
- Panchayat Union Elementary School (PUES), Kandampalayam (UDISE: 33091400804) – Offers classes 1 to 5.
- Gandhi Matriculation Higher Secondary School, Kandampalayam (UDISE: 33091400805) – Offers classes 1 to 12.
- SKV Higher Secondary School, M. Kandampalayam (UDISE: 33091400104) – Offers classes 6 to 12.
- SKV Matriculation Higher Secondary School, M. Kandampalayam (UDISE: 33091400107) – Offers classes 1 to 12.
- SKV Girls Matriculation Higher Secondary School, M. Kandampalayam (UDISE: 33091400110) – Offers classes 6 to 12.
- SKV Vidhyaashram Senior Secondary School, M. Kandampalayam (UDISE: 33091400109) – Offers classes 1 to 12.
