= Kanakkampalayam =

- suburb
- Location in Tamil Nadu, India
- Coordinates: 10°34′55″N 77°14′37″E
- Country: India
- State: Tamil Nadu
- District: Tiruppur
- Metro: Coimbatore

Population (2001)
  - Total: 12,180

Languages
  - Official: Tamil
- Time zone: UTC+5:30 (IST)
- Vehicle registration: TN 78

Kanakkampalayam is a town in Tiruppur district in the Indian state of Tamil Nadu.

== Demographics ==
As of 2001 India census, Kanakkampalayam had a population of 12,180. Males constitute 50% of the population and females 50%. Kanakkampalayam has an average literacy rate of 79%, higher than the national average of 59.5%: male literacy is 85%, and female literacy is 74%. In Kanakkampalayam, 9% of the population is under 6 years of age.
