= Velayuthampalayam =

Neighbourhood in Karur district, Tamil Nadu, India

- town
- Country: India
- State: Tamil Nadu
- District: Karur

Languages
  - Official: Tamil
- Time zone: UTC+5:30 (IST)
- PIN: 639117
- Telephone code: 04324

Velayuthampalayam is a town located in Karur District in the Indian state of Tamil Nadu. It comes under the jurisdiction of Pugalur municipality. This town is situated on the footsteps of Pugali Malai Arunattan Malai, which houses Lord Murugan. The river Cauvery is 3 kilometers away from the town. It is very close to TNPL Kagithapuram. The adjacent places are TNPL Kagithapuram, Thottakuritchi and Karappalayam.

== Geography ==
Velayuthampalaym is located 11°4'48"N 78°0'1"E . It has average elevation of 125 meters (413 feet).

== Climate ==
The highest temperature is obtained in early May to early June usually about 34 °C, though it usually exceeds 38 °C for a few days most years. Average daily temperature during January is around 23 °C, though the temperature rarely falls below 17 °C. The average annual rainfall is about 725 mm. It gets most of its seasonal rainfall from the north-east monsoon winds, from late September to mid November.

== Pugali Malai [Arunattan Malai] ==
The temple in Pugalur situated north west of Karur dedicated to Lord Murugan on a small hill at Velayuthanpalayam is famous for excellent sculptures, the famous Samanarkal Cave and oldest Tamil Script Brahmi sculpture.

== Education ==
The literacy rates are 77.58% and 60.35% among males and females respectively.

The schools in the town are :

- Pugalur Boys Higher Secondary School, Pugalur
- Pugalur Girls High School, Pugalur
- TNPL Matric Higher Secondary School, Kagithapuram
- TNPL Public School (CBSE), Kagithapuram
- Mathy Nursery Primary School, Velayuthampalayam
- P S F Aided Elementary School, Pugalu
- Panchayat Union Elementary School, Velayuthampalayam
- Panchayat Union Elementary School, Thiruvalluvar Nagar
- Panchayat Union Elementary School, Nadunanaparapu
- Panchayat Union Elementary School, Pugalur
- Panchayat Union Elementary School, Coolagoundanur
- Sree Krishna Matric School, Velayuthumpalayam

=== Marriage halls ===
- Thiruvalluvar Mandabam
- Gandhi Manadabam
- Pugali Manadabam
- Shri Kamatchi Mahal

=== Temples ===
- Sree Mariamman Temple
- Pugali-Murugan Temple
- Angamuthusamy Temple
- Sree Munniapan Temple

== Transport ==
=== By Road ===
The town has very good transport facilities in the form of Private Bus and Government run buses. The town is located on the karur and parmathy-velur highway.

=== By Train ===
The nearby town pugalur (Code:PGR) has a railway station which is well connected to Erode, Coimbatore, Trichy, Chennai and cochin. Both passenger trains and express trains pass through this station.

=== By Air ===
The nearest international airport is in Trichy (87 km). Another airport is located at Coimbatore (115 km).

== Entertainment ==
There are no cinema theaters in and around Velayuthampalaymam. Pugalur Annai [புகழூர் அன்னை] and Velayuthampalayam Caveri [வேலாயுதம்பாளையம் காவேரி]' were the two theaters / cinema halls, functional a long time back but not now. One has to travel to 'Karur' or 'Paramathi Velur' for a movie. Most of the town residents have access to almost all television channels.

== Agriculture ==
The Agriculture plays an important role in economy wealth. There are different types of cultivating. The major cultivating plants are Sugarcane cultivating, coconut cultivating, Betel leaves, etc.

== Healthcare ==
The town has a Government General Hospital at the footsteps of Pugali Malai. There are two small private hospitals on the Karur-Velur highway which has inpatient services. There are many small clinics run by several doctors. The medical services are well supported by clustered medical stores in the junction of velayuthampalayam. For major medical and surgical services, the public go to one of the places(Paramathy Velur, Karur, Erode, Coimbatore, Tiruchi).

== Banking ==
Indian Overseas bank, Bank of India, and Lakshmi Vilas Bank are located in this town. Pallavan Grama Bank, one of the Regional Rural Banks has one branch at Velayuthampalayam near bye pass road. The town has lot of privately owned financial corporations. The Automated Teller Machines (ATMs) are available from Indian Overseas Bank and The Lakshmi Vilas Bank Ltd, State Bank of India are located at Kandanpalayam, Pugalur Bye Pass Road & Pugalur Kagitha puram respectively. Bank Of India ATM is located at Velur road, Velayuthampalayam.

== Communication ==
BSNL, Airtel, Reliance Jio, Vodafone idea are the communication providers to this town. They provide 2G, 3G, and 4G LTE smartphone networks. The availability of internet is also abundant(Mostly dial-up connections). Now BSNL has provided broadband internet connection.

== Economy ==
=== Paper ===
TNPL is promoted by the Government of Tamil Nadu with loan assistance from the World Bank. Today TNPL is the largest producer of bagasse (sugarcane waste from Sugar mills) based paper in the world and the 2nd largest paper producer in Asia. TNPL produces 4,00,000 tons of Printing & writing paper and consumes 1 million tons of bagasse every year. It is located 2 kilometers away from this town.

=== Sugar ===
EID Parry has a sugar factory in Pugalur, about a kilometer away from this town. It has a capacity of 4000 TCD. It also has a 22 MW co-generation Power plant, with TNPL.

== Polling station ==
Panchayat Union elementary School North facing remains as the polling station for this town and covers areas including East Agraharam, Angalamman Kovil theru, Mela Agraharam, Bazzar Street.
