= Sokkankadu =

- Village
- Country: India
- State: Tamil Nadu
- District: Karur

Population (2007)
  - Total: 50

Languages
  - Official: Tamil
- Time zone: UTC+5:30 (IST)
- PIN: 639136
- Telephone code: 04324

Sokkankadu is a small village located in Karur District in the Indian state of Tamil Nadu. It is very close to TNPL Pugalur and falls under its jurisdiction. The adjacent villages are Sottaiyur, Moolimangalam, Pandipalayam, Masagoundanpudur and Palamapuram.

== Demographics ==
This village has around 15 homes with a population of 50. All are Kongu Vellalar Gounders.

== Communication ==
BSNL, Aircel, Airtel, Tata Indicom, Reliance are the communication providers. The well-penetrated landline connections are provided by BSNL again. The availability of the internet is fair (mostly dial-up connections).

== Transport ==
Transport facilities are low. Some private mini buses are running. Most people commute by bicycles or two-wheeler motorcycles.

The nearby place Pugalur (Code:PGR) has a railway station which is well connected to Erode, Coimbatore, Trichy, Chennai and Cochin. Both passenger trains and express trains pass through this station.

The nearest airport is in Trichy (87 km). Major Airport is located at Coimbatore (115 km).

== Entertainment ==
There are more theatres nearby (Paramathi Velur & karur) which are some kilometers away from the village. Most of the residents have access to almost all television channels.
