= Muruganpalayam =

- Town
- Location in Tamil Nadu, India Muruganpalayam (India)
- Coordinates: 11°05′56″N 77°19′41″E
- Country: India
- State: Tamil Nadu
- District: Tirupur

Population (2001)
  - Total: 14,431

Languages
  - Official: Tamil
- Time zone: UTC+5:30 (IST)
- Vehicle registration: TN 39, TN 42

Muruganpalayam is a census town in Tiruppur district in the Indian state of Tamil Nadu.

== Demographics ==
As of 2001 India census, Muruganpalayam had a population of 14,431. Males constitute 52% of the population and females 48%. Muruganpalayam has an average literacy rate of 64%, higher than the national average of 59.5%: male literacy is 73%, and female literacy is 55%. In Muruganpalayam, 12% of the population is under 6 years of age.
