= Tiruppur taluk =

Tiruppur taluk is a taluk of Tirupur district of the Indian state of Tamil Nadu. The headquarters is the town of Tiruppur.

== Demographics ==
According to the 2011 census, the taluk of Tiruppur had a population of 980,851 with 499,648 males and 481,203 females. There were 963 women for every 1,000 men. The taluk had a literacy rate of 76.36%. Child population in the age group below 6 years were 52,948 Males and 50,626 Females.
