= Chengapalli =

Town in Tamil Nadu, India

Coordinates: 11.198789°N 77.422768°E

Chengapalli is a biggest landmark located in between Salem to Coimbatore Highway (NH 544) Tirupur district, Tamil Nadu, India. It has the status of a panchayat town in Tamil Nadu. It is famous for textiles. Almost 5000 peoples coming from other areas for their employments. It is having four way and six way roads.

It lies on the Salem-Coimbatore National Highway 544 (formerly NH 47).

== Places of Worship ==
Arulmigu Azhagunachi Amman Temple.

Seraikannimar Temple.

soleeswarar Temple. Sengal Vinayakar Temple. Sethu Mariyamman Temple and more Than 16 Karupparayan temples around Chengapalli

== Neighborhoods ==
- Vijayamangalam
- Perumanallur
- Tiruppur
- Uthukuli
- Perundurai
- Avinashi
- Gobichettipaalayam
- Kanchikoil
- Kunnathur
- Thingalur
- Ingur
- Chennimalai
- Kavundapadi
- Bhavani
- Komarapalayam
- Thirumuruganpoondi

== Transport ==
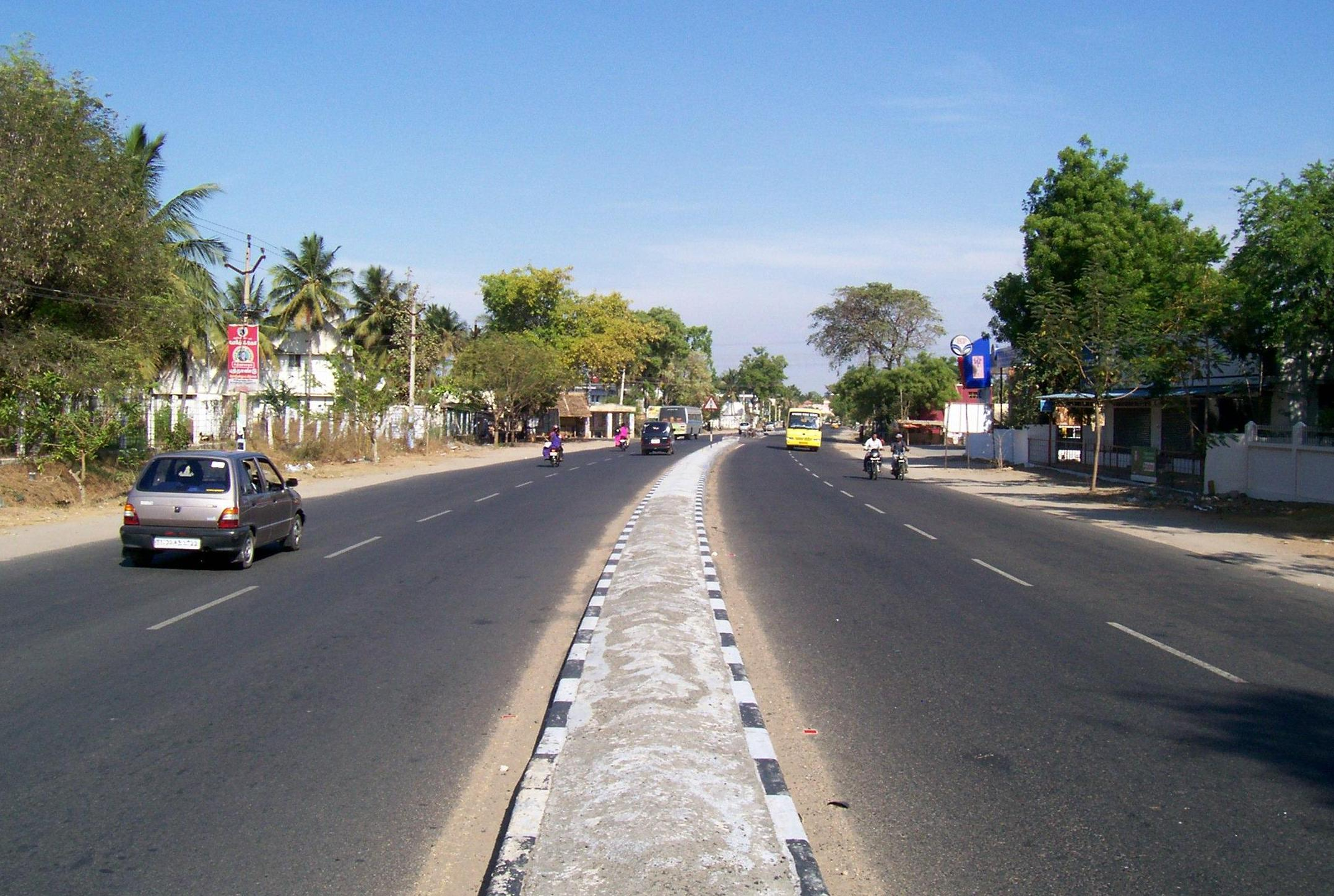
Chengapalli-Avinashi-Coimbatore

The nearest airport is the Coimbatore International Airport, which is about 50 km away from Chengapalli.

The nearest railway station is Uttukuli railway station (UKL), located approximately 4 km from Chengapalli.

Bus services operated by both the Tamil Nadu State Transport Corporation and private operators provide public transportation to and from Chengapalli.

Chengapalli's geographical location enables it to be a regional hub for many long distance travellers to and from the twin cities Coimbatore and Tirupur.
