= Tamil Nadu Newsprint and Papers Limited =

Paper company based in Chennai, India

- Type: Public
- Traded as: BSE: 531426; NSE: TNPL
- Industry: Bagasse-based paper mill
- Founded: 1979
- Headquarters: Chennai, Karur, Manapparai, Tiruchirappalli
- Key people: Dr. M. Sai Kumar, I.A.S. (Chairman & Managing Director)
- Revenue: ▼₹39.58 billion (US$410 million) (2020)
- Net income: ▲₹1.30 billion (US$13 million) (2020)
- Total assets: ▲₹40.39 billion (US$420 million) (2020)
- Total equity: ▲₹17.13 billion (US$180 million) (2020)
- Owner: Government of Tamil Nadu
- Number of employees: 2567 (2020)
- Parent: Department of Industries (Tamil Nadu)
- Website: www.tnpl.com

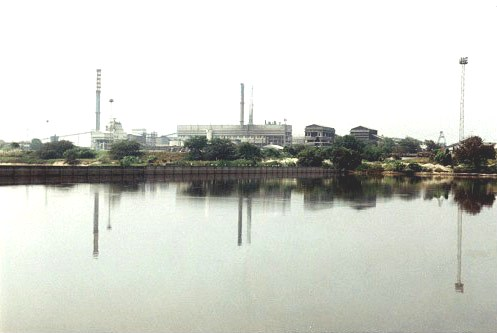
Mill view of TNPL, Karur

The Tamil Nadu Newsprint and Papers Limited (TNPL) is a company that was established by the Government of Tamil Nadu to produce newsprint and writing paper using bagasse, a sugarcane residue. The Government of Tamil Nadu listed the paper mill in April 1979 under the provisions of the Companies Act of 1956. The factory is situated at Kagithapuram in the Karur District of Tamil Nadu and Manapparai, Trichy district of Tamil Nadu. The registered office of the company is located in Guindy, Chennai.

== History ==
The company commenced production in 1984 with an initial capacity of 90,000 tonnes per annum. TNPL started the commercial production of newsprint on its new Paper Machine No. 2 in January 1996. The machine was supplied by Voith Sulzer Paper Technology and its licensee in India, Larsen and Toubro Limited, and has opened up vistas for newsprint making.

== Technology and process ==
TNPL has ventured with nearby sugar mills such as Sakthi Sugar Mills for continued supply of Bagasse for the Paper mill where steam will be provided to the sugar mill in exchange of bagasse.

== Quality standards ==
TNPL has obtained the ISO 9001:2000 certification from RWTÜV of Germany for the development and supply of newsprint and papers. TNPL is accredited with ISO 14001:2004 certification.

=== TNPL Effluent Water Lift Irrigation Society (TEWLIS) ===
Under the TNPL Effluent Water Lift Irrigation Scheme is intended to provide farmers effluent water for irrigation purpose. The treated effluent water is used to irrigate about 1,250-acre (5.1 km^{2}) of dry land with about 250 farmers of the TNPL Effluent Water Lift Irrigation Society. The effluents have to comply with the norms set by the Tamil Nadu Pollution Control Board.

=== TNPL Plantation Programme ===
TNPL has developed plantations in 2004–2005 and launched two plantation schemes, namely Farm Forestry and Captive Plantation.

Captive plantations are raised on lands owned by companies, government departments, and educational institutions on a revenue-sharing basis or on a lease-rent basis. The minimum criteria for captive plantations is that the land should be a block of 25 acres (100,000 m^{2}) and above in a single location.

In the last five years of operation (2004–05 to 2008–09), TNPL has raised plantations in 37,556 acres (151.98 km^{2}) involving 8235 farmers in twenty-eight districts in Tamil Nadu under the Farm Forestry scheme and 2,735 acres (11.07 km^{2}) under the Captive Plantation Scheme. TNPL has planted pulpwood on about 40,291 acres of land (as of 31 March 2009).

=== Clonal propagation and research center ===
TNPL established a clonal propagation and research center. The clonal production centre was started with a mini clonal hedge garden of 4,000 m^{2} (43,000 sq ft), a mist chamber of 8,000 m^{2} (86,000 sq ft), and 20,000 m^{2} (220,000 sq ft) of open nursery. The production center was established at an outlay of about 50 million. The plantation schemes are being implemented throughout Tamil Nadu through 10 regional offices in Karur, Manaparai, Tirunelveli, Karaikudi, Pudukottai, Namakkal, Trichy, Tanjore, Jayangondam, and Panruti.

=== Forestry research and development ===
TNPL has partnered with the NAIP-ICAR-sponsored project titled "A value chain on industrial Agro-forestry in Tamil Nadu" for the promotion of tree husbandry with improved short-rotation clones and genotypes through contract farming. Forest College & Research Institute (FC & RI), Tamil Nadu Agricultural University, Mettupalayam is the Consortium Leader of this project. This project is being implemented to raise 500 acres (2.0 km^{2}) of cluster plantation in 10 taluks covering 5 districts in Tamil Nadu.

TNPL has obtained the ISO 14001 certification from RMTUV, Germany. TNPL has commissioned the bio-methanation plant, which generates around 23,000 m^{3} of biogas (methane) per day, to be used as fuel in the lime-kiln in place of furnace oil. The biogas replaces around 10–12 kiloliters of furnace oil per day in the lime-kiln. In 2003–2004, the bio-methanation plant generated 4,145,000 m^{3} of methane gas. TNPL also obtained the 3 Leaves Award under the Green Rating project of the Centre for Science and Environment, New Delhi, in October 2004.

== Energy management policy ==
TNPL has installed its own power generating facility through the installation of 61.18 MW power generating equipment (TG Sets) installed at the paper mill site and the 18 MW wind farm installed at Devarkulam and Perungudi of Tirunelveli district. The surplus power generated is being exported to the State Grid. The wind farm capacity was changed to 21.75 MW in March 2004 by installing 3 wind turbine generators of 1250 kW capacity each. It has installed a bio-methanation plant to generate methane gas from the effluent water (bagasse wash water) and use it as fuel as a substitute for furnace oil in the lime kiln. In 2004–2005, TNPL generated 3,412,000 m^{3} methane gas. The Indian Industry has recognised the project as an Innovative Project.

== Registered projects ==
=== Methane extraction project ===
TNPL commissioned a special kind of reactor concept for the "high rate" anaerobic treatment of an upflow anaerobic sludge blanket (UASB) reactor, which uses anaerobic granular sludge bed technology. The project also involves a system for extracting biogas from the closed reactor as fuel in a lime kiln, which had been using furnace oil.

=== 6.75 MW Small Scale Grid Connected Wind Electricity Generation Project ===
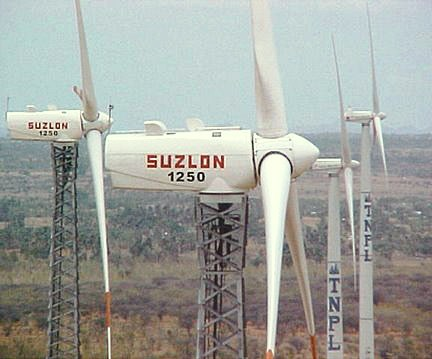
Wind generators of TNPL (extreme right) at Devarkulam, Tirunelveli, Tamil Nadu, India.

TNPL has generated energy. The project activity involves the installation, operation and maintenance of seven grid connected wind electricity generators (WEG) owned by the project proponent, TNPL. The electricity generated from the seven WEGs will be exported to the Tamil Nadu Electricity Board (TNEB) grid. The seven WEGs have been installed in two phases.

The first phase involved installation of four NEG Micon 750 kW WEGs and the second phase involved the erection of three Suzlon Energy WEGs of 1.25 MW. On 30 March 2001, TNPL commenced operations for the first phase of the project with the installation of the four 750 kW WEGs. The second phase of the project commenced operations in March 2004. All seven WEGs have been installed in the Thirunelveli district, in the state of Tamil Nadu, India.

=== Savings ===
Title of the project	Year of implementation	Total CO_{2} reduction (MT)	Total annual saving (₹ million)
Registered CDM project I: Methane Extraction and fuel conservation Project	2003	40000	32.64
Registered CDM Project II: 6.75 MW Small Scale Grid Connected Wind Electricity Generation Project	2004	14000	11.424
CDM project III under validation: "Energy Efficiency Improvement in Recovery boiler."	2008	145000	118.32
CDM project IV under validation: 13.75 MW – Grid connected wind electricity generation project at Devarkulam by TNPL.	2007	30000	24.48
CDM project V under validation is: Methane extraction and utilization as fuel Biogas – II	2008	27000	22.032

== Products ==
The paper produced by TNPL is subjected to elemental chlorine-free (ECF) bleaching. The paper is acid-free. TNPL manufactures papers in substances ranging from 50 GSM to 90 GSM. Newsprint is normally manufactured in 49 Gsm (grams per square meter) reels and directly sold by the company to various newspaper establishments such as The Hindu, Malayala Manorama, Ananda Bazaar Patrika, and others. The printing and writing paper is manufactured in reel and sheet forms, with the Gsm varying from 50 to 80.

=== Export network ===
TNPL is also exporting about 18% of the PWP production to 20 countries.

- Australia
- Egypt
- Greece
- Indonesia
- Jordan
- Kenya
- Malaysia
- Myanmar
- Nepal
- Nigeria
- Philippines
- Singapore
- Sri Lanka
- Sudan
- South Africa
- Taiwan
- Turkey
- U.A.E
- UK
- United States
- Yemen

The "World Wide Fund" has entered into a pact with TNPL to use the "Panda" logo in its branded products.

== Controversy ==
On 14 September 2009, the General Farmers' Association of Pugalur, the Pugalur Consumer Protection Council, and the Pugalur Channel Aycutdars' Association alleged that the TNPL's release of effluents into the channel has caused the public in the area to be "afraid of the ill effects of the effluents".

=== Response ===
The TNPL has claimed that no effluent was being let into the Pugalur Channel, as alleged. TNPL Managing Director Mohammed Nasimuddin stated that "The TNPL has implemented a Mill Development Plan at a capital outlay of ₹6 billion mainly for incorporating various environmental improvement measures such as switching over to Elemental Chlorine Free Bleaching and reduction in water consumption. In this system the use of chlorine is totally eliminated and the bleaching is carried out only by chlorine dioxide".

== Shareholding ==
The government of Tamil Nadu listed TNPL shares in the following organizations:

- Bombay Stock Exchange
- National Stock Exchange of India
- National Securities Depository Limited
- Central Depository Services Limited
- Debenture Trustees – Vijaya Bank

TNPL became a share market listed company from the year 1997. The government of Tamil Nadu declared TNPL as "Other Companies" list from the previous "Government of Tamil Nadu's Public Sector Undertakings" list after 1997. The government holds 35.32% of equity shares in TNPL as of 31 March 2012.

== Management ==
- Thiru. kumar jayant, I.A.S. – chairman and Managing Director
- Thiru. Nagappan – Director
- Thiru. Soundarakumar, I.A.S – Director
- Thiru. Rita Harish Thakkar, I.A.S – Director
- Thiru. N. Narayanan – Director
- Thiru. V. Chandrasekaran – Director
- Thiru. Shanmugam – Director
